= George Gavin =

Irish politician

George Gavin MP

Member of Parliament for Limerick City
- In office 5 May 1859 – 9 February 1874 Serving with Isaac Butt (1871–1874); Francis William Russell (1859–1871)
- Preceded by: James Spaight; Francis William Russell
- Succeeded by: Isaac Butt; Richard O'Shaughnessy
- In office 15 February 1858 – 10 May 1858 Serving with Francis William Russell
- Preceded by: James O'Brien; Francis William Russell
- Succeeded by: James Spaight; Francis William Russell

Personal details
- Born: 1810
- Died: 23 October 1880 (aged 70)
- Party: Liberal
- Other political affiliations: Independent Irish

Major George Gavin (1810 – 23 October 1880) was an Irish Independent Irish Party and Liberal politician.

Gavin was first elected MP as an Independent Irish representative for Limerick City at a by-election in February 1858 but was unseated under three months later due to bribery through his agent.

He was re-elected for the seat as Liberal representative in 1859 and held the seat until he stood down in 1874.

He served as High Sheriff of Limerick City in 1857.

Parliament of the United Kingdom
Preceded by James Spaight; Francis William Russell	Member of Parliament for Limerick City; 1859 – 1874; With: Isaac Butt (1871–1874); Francis William Russell (1859–1871)	Succeeded by Isaac Butt; Richard O'Shaughnessy
Preceded by James O'Brien; Francis William Russell	Member of Parliament for Limerick City; February 1858 – May 1858; With: Francis William Russell	Succeeded by James Spaight; Francis William Russell
