= Robert Potter (Irish politician) =

Member of Parliament for Limerick City
- In office 15 July 1852 – 1 October 1854 Serving with Francis William Russell
- Preceded by: Henry Fitzalan-Howard; John O'Brien
- Succeeded by: Francis William Russell; James O'Brien

Personal details
- Died: 1 October 1854
- Party: Independent Irish

Robert Potter (died 1 October 1854) was an Irish Independent Irish Party politician.

Potter became an Independent Irish Party MP for Limerick City at the 1852 general election but died two years later in 1854.

Parliament of the United Kingdom
Preceded by John O'Brien; Henry Fitzalan-Howard	Member of Parliament for Limerick City; 1852–1854; With: Francis William Russell	Succeeded by Francis William Russell; James O'Brien
