= Henry Gill =

Henry Gill may refer to:

- Henry Gill (Australian politician) (1840–1914), member of the Tasmanian House of Assembly
- Henry Joseph Gill (1836–1903), Irish publisher, translator, and politician
- Henry Gill (Jesuit) (1872–1945), Irish Jesuit priest and scientist
- Henry R. T. Gill, Canadian figure skater
