= James Spaight (MP) =

Irish politician (1818–1892)

James Spaight MP

Member of Parliament for Limerick City
- In office 21 May 1858 – 5 May 1859 Serving with Francis William Russell
- Preceded by: George Gavin; Francis William Russell
- Succeeded by: George Gavin; Francis William Russell

Personal details
- Born: 1818
- Died: 21 January 1892 (aged 73–74)
- Party: Conservative
- Spouse: Elizabeth Alason Eckford (m. 1850)
- Parent(s): Francis Spaight; Agnes Patterson

Sir James Spaight (1818 – 21 January 1892) was an Irish Conservative politician.

== Early life ==
Spaight was the second son of Francis Spaight, the owner of the ill-fated Francis Spaight ship, and Agnes Paterson, daughter of James Campbell Paterson.

== Political career ==
In 1853, he was High Sheriff of Limerick City and later, in 1856, 1877 and 1883, he was Mayor of Limerick. From 1871 to his death, he was president of the Limerick Chamber of Commerce. At some point, he was also a justice of the peace and Deputy Lieutenant for County Tipperary.

Spaight was elected unopposed as MP for Limerick City at a by-election in May 1858 but lost the seat at the next general election in 1859. He attempted to regain the seat on multiple occasions – in 1865, 1874, 1879, 1880, 1883 and 1885 – but was each time unsuccessful.

Spaight was knighted in 1887.

== Other interests ==
Spaight was a subscriber, council member and then, in 1869, president of the Athenaeum. He was the president of the Limerick Chamber from 1871–92, his father Francis was president from 1847–61. He was the vice-president of the Limerick Protestant Young Mens Association.

Spaight was also an active freemason, serving as Provincial Grand Master of North Munster.

Spaight was also a keen sailor, being made commodore of Lough Derg Yacht Club from 1846. One of his yachts, the Gossamer, was badly damaged by fire in 1846. Spaight had taken took a party of friends out on Lough Derg on Friday and returned back to Derry Castle at 10 o'clock. The yacht was powered by steam, and all the fires were quenched before the party disembarked, but the yacht was found to be completely burned to the waterline the following morning. One of Spaight's other yachts included the 12-ton sailing yacht Gem, which he used to compete in Lough Derg Yacht Club in 1847.

== Personal life ==
He married Elizabeth Alason Eckford, daughter of John Eckford, in 1850.

Parliament of the United Kingdom
Preceded by George Gavin; Francis William Russell	Member of Parliament for Limerick City; 1858 – 1859; With: Francis William Russell	Succeeded by George Gavin; Francis William Russell
