= John O'Brien (Irish politician) =

Irish politician

Member of Parliament for Limerick City
- In office 1841–1852
- Preceded by: William Roche
- Succeeded by: Robert Potter

Personal details
- Born: 6 December 1794 Limerick, Ireland
- Died: 6 February 1855 (aged 60) Dublin
- Resting place: Francis Street Burial Ground, Dublin
- Citizenship: British
- Party: Whig 1841-47; Repeal Association 1847-52
- Spouse: Ellen (née Murphy)
- Children: Six sons (including Peter) and four daughters
- Relatives: Cornelius O'Brien (stepfather); James O'Brien (younger brother)

John O'Brien (6 December 1794 – 6 February 1855) was an Irish MP who represented Limerick City in the UK Parliament 1841–1852.

O'Brien was the eldest son of James O'Brien of Limerick and Margaret Long, daughter of Peter Long of Waterford. James died on 21 February 1806, and Margaret subsequently married Cornelius O'Brien (1782–1857), MP for County Clare 1832-47 and 1852–57.

John is later described as of Elmvale (an unidentified place in County Clare), JP; and later of Ballinalacken, County Clare (presumably Ballinalacken Castle). In 1836, he served as High Sheriff of Clare. He was elected MP for Limerick City in 1841 (Whig Party), and was re-elected in 1847 (Repeal Association); on both occasions as first member in that two-member constituency.

In 1827, he married Ellen Murphy, daughter of Jeremiah Murphy (of Hyde Park, Cork). Their fifth son, Peter, became a lawyer and judge, and served as Lord Chief Justice of Ireland. John died in Dublin in 1855, and was interred in Francis Street Burial Ground. Ellen died on 19 December 1866, or in 1869 (sources differ), and was interred in the same place.

John's youngest brother, James, their parents' fourth son, was a lawyer, judge and politician who represented Limerick City as MP from 1854 to 1858.

Parliament of Great Britain
Preceded by William Roche; Sir David Vandeleur Roche	Member of Parliament for Limerick City; 1841–1852; With: Sir David Vandeleur Roche 1841–1844; James Kelly 1844–1847; John O'Connell 1847–1851; Henry Fitzalan-Howard 1851–1852	Succeeded by Robert Potter; Francis William Russell
