= Home government =

Home government may refer to:

- Home Government Association, political party in pre-partition Ireland
- Douglas-Home ministry, the British government led by Sir Alec Douglas-Home from 1963 to 1964

== See also ==
- Ministry of home affairs
