= 1888 Limerick City by-election =

UK Parliamentary by-election

The 1888 Limerick by-election was a parliamentary by-election held for the United Kingdom House of Commons constituency of Limerick City on 17 April 1888. The vacancy arose because of the resignation of the sitting member, Henry Joseph Gill of the Irish Parliamentary Party. In the resulting by-election another Irish Parliamentary Party candidate, Francis Arthur O'Keefe, a solicitor and Mayor of Limerick, was elected unopposed.
