= 1871 Limerick City by-election =

UK Parliamentary by-election

The 1871 Limerick City by-election was fought on 20 September 1871. The by-election was fought due to the death of the incumbent Liberal MP, Francis William Russell. It was won by the Home Rule League candidate Isaac Butt, who was unopposed. The gain was retained by the Home Rule League at the 1874 general election.
