= Richard O'Shaughnessy (MP) =

Irish politician

Richard O'Shaughnessy MP MVO CB

Member of Parliament for Limerick City
- In office 31 January 1874 – 15 November 1883 Serving with Daniel Fitzgerald Gabbett (1879 – 1883); Isaac Butt (1874 – 1879)
- Preceded by: Isaac Butt; George Gavin
- Succeeded by: Daniel Fitzgerald Gabbett; Edward McMahon

Personal details
- Born: 1842 Limerick, Ireland
- Died: 17 August 1918 (aged 75–76)
- Party: Home Rule League
- Spouse: Ellen Potter
- Education: Trinity College, Dublin

Richard O'Shaughnessy CB MVO (1842 – 17 August 1918) was an Irish Home Rule League politician.

He was elected Home Rule MP for Limerick City in 1874 and held the seat until he was appointed a registrar of petty sessions clerks in 1883.

After leaving office, he was also Commissioner for Public Works in Ireland from 1891 to 1903, and was considered for the post of Under-Secretary for Ireland twice.

He became a Member of the Royal Victorian Order in 1900 and a Companion of the Order of the Bath in 1903.

Parliament of the United Kingdom
Preceded by Isaac Butt; George Gavin	Member of Parliament for Limerick City; 1874 – 1883; With: Daniel Fitzgerald Gabbett (1879 – 1883); Isaac Butt (1874 – 1879)	Succeeded by Daniel Fitzgerald Gabbett; Edward McMahon
