= Edward Daly (Irish revolutionary) =

Irish revolutionary (1891–1916)

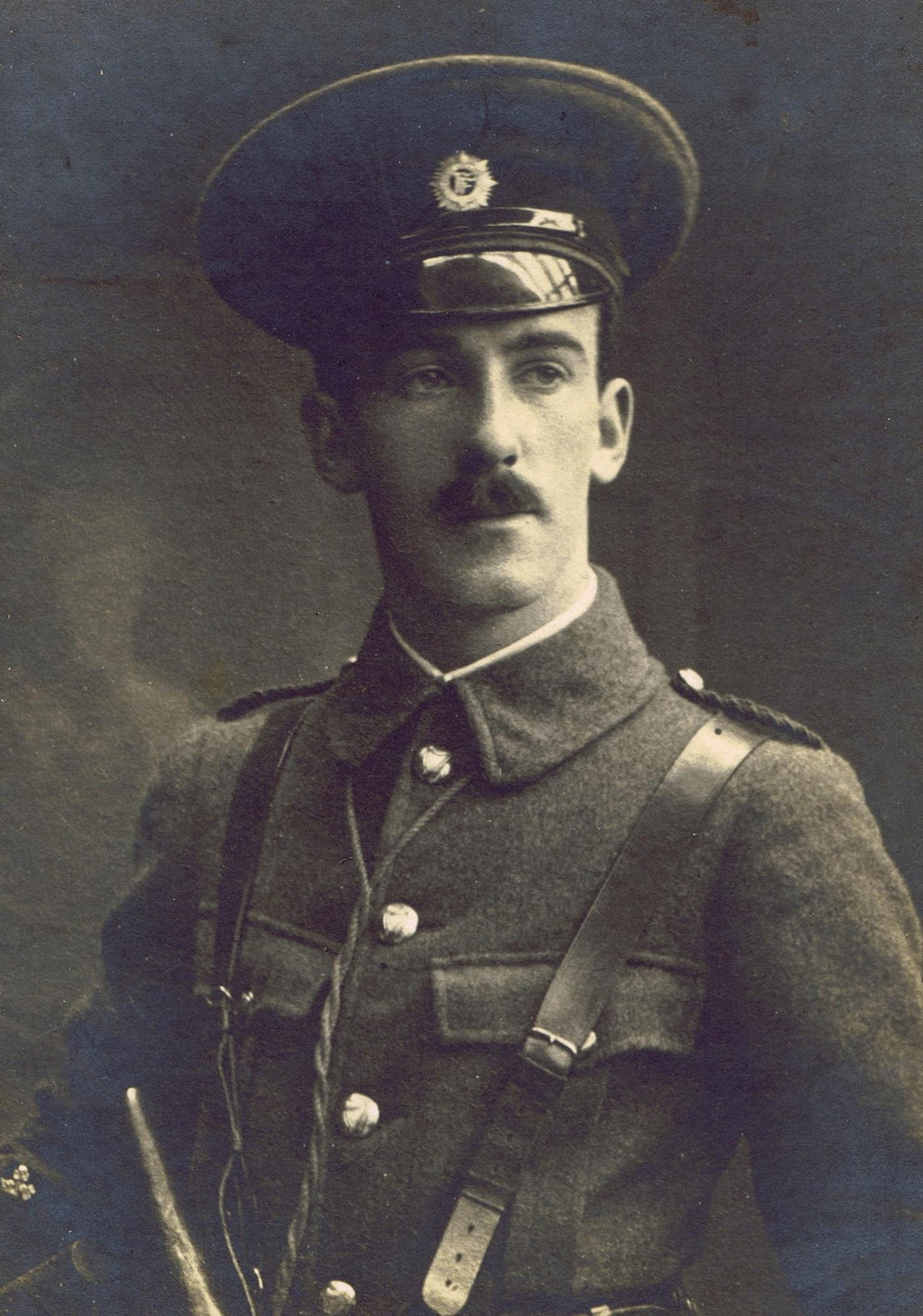
- Born: John Edward Daly; 25 February 1891; Limerick, Ireland
- Died: 4 May 1916 (aged 25); Kilmainham Gaol, Dublin, Ireland
- Cause of death: Execution by firing squad
- Relatives: Kathleen Clarke (sister)
- Military career
- Allegiance: Irish Republic
- Branch: Irish Volunteers
- Service years: 1913–1916
- Rank: Commandant
- Nickname: "Ned"
- Commands: 1st Battalion, Dublin Brigade
- Conflicts: Easter Rising
- Memorials: Bray Daly railway station

John Edward Daly (25 February 1891 – 4 May 1916; Irish: Éamonn Ó Dálaigh) was commandant of Dublin's 1st Battalion of the Irish Volunteers during the Easter Rising of 1916. He was the youngest man to hold that rank and the youngest executed in the aftermath.

== Early life ==
Ned Daly was born at 26 Frederick Street (now O'Curry street), Limerick, on 25 February 1891, the only son of ten children born to Edward and Catherine Daly (née O'Mara). He was the younger brother of Kathleen Clarke, wife of Tom Clarke, and an active member of the Irish Republican Brotherhood (IRB). His father, Edward, was a Fenian (IRB member) who died aged 41 five months before his son's birth. His uncle was John Daly, a prominent republican who had taken part in the Fenian Rising and Fenian Dynamite Campaign.

He was educated by the Presentation Sisters at Sexton Street, the Congregation of Christian Brothers at Roxboro Road and at Leamy’s commercial college. He spent a short time as an apprentice baker in Glasgow before returning to Limerick to work in Spaight's timber yard. In 1913 he moved to Dublin, where he lived with the Clarkes and worked in a chemist's shop.

== Irish Volunteers ==
Although Daly's membership of the IRB is certain, it is not known when he joined the organisation. In November 1913, Daly joined the newly founded Irish Volunteers, and was soon captain of B Company, 1st Battalion. He was assiduous in his study of military manuals and the professionalism of his company gained the admiration of senior officers in actions such as the Howth gun-running of 1914. In March 1915, he was promoted to the rank of commandant of 1st Battalion. Like many other of the rising's leaders Daly was a member of the Keating branch of the Gaelic League.

== The Easter Rising ==
Daly's battalion was assigned to the Four Courts and areas to the west and north of the centre of Dublin, saw harsh fighting during the rising. He was ordered to surrender his battalion on 29 April by Patrick Pearse. Daly was court martialled under the Defence of the Realm Act 1914 and executed by firing squad on 4 May 1916, at the age of 25.

== Legacy ==
Bray railway station in County Wicklow was renamed Bray Daly railway station in his honour in 1966.
