= Edward McMahon (MP) =

Edward McMahon MP

Member of Parliament for Limerick City
- In office 16 November 1883 – 24 November 1885 Serving with Daniel Fitzgerald Gabbett
- Preceded by: Daniel Fitzgerald Gabbett; Richard O'Shaughnessy
- Succeeded by: Henry Joseph Gill

Personal details
- Died: 1901
- Party: Home Rule League

Edward McMahon (? – 1901) was an Irish Home Rule League politician.

He was elected Home Rule Member of Parliament (MP) for Limerick City at a by-election in 1883 but did not seek re-election when the seat was reduced to one member in 1885.

Parliament of the United Kingdom
Preceded by Daniel Fitzgerald Gabbett; Richard O'Shaughnessy	Member of Parliament for Limerick City; 1883 – 1885; With: Daniel Fitzgerald Gabbett	Succeeded by Henry Joseph Gill
