= William Roche (Irish politician) =

Irish politician, died 1850

William Roche (1775 – 27 April 1850) was an Irish politician.

Born in Limerick, Roche may have followed his brother James in studying at the Catholic College in Saintes. In 1797, he and another brother took over the family business, a general store in Dominick Street. In 1801, they sold this, and opened Roche's Bank on Charlotte Quay. This proved successful and survived struggles in the early 1820s which led to the closure of many rivals, but in 1825, they sold its business to the Provincial Bank.

Roche was a strong supporter of Catholic emancipation, and when in 1809 he turned down a knighthood from the Lord Lieutenant of Ireland, it was interpreted as a protest against British policy in Ireland. Although Catholics were not permitted to hold political offices in Ireland, an act of Parliament was passed to permit Roche to become a magistrate.

Roche stood at the 1832 UK general election in Limerick City, and won the seat. Although he did not pledge to the Repeal Association, he received the support of Daniel O'Connell, who had known him for thirty years, and after election was associated with the Repeal group. Despite this, Roche accepted an invitation to meet with William IV of the United Kingdom in 1833.

Roche was re-elected at the 1835 and 1837 UK general elections, and stood down in 1841.

Parliament of the United Kingdom
Preceded by Thomas Spring Rice	Member of Parliament for Limerick City; 1832–1841; With: David Roche	Succeeded by David Roche; John O'Brien
