= Philip Francis Johnson =

Irish political activist

Philip Francis Johnson, usually known as P. F. Johnson (1835 – 3 November 1926) was an Irish nationalist political labour activist and Kanturk hotel proprietor. Born at Mallow, County Cork, he co-founded in 1869 the Kanturk Labourers’ Club, where he was lifelong committed to the well-being of labourers in the Munster region. He had close Fenian connections and was active in the Land League. Although an anti-Parnellite he supported the Irish National League with a branch in Kanturk.

== Early years ==
Johnson was well educated and widely travelled, as a youth he spent eight years in India, visiting the South Sea Islands. When he returned to Ireland in the late 1850s he worked as a commercial agent and stationmaster. He married Teresa Rourke in September 1857 and they had two daughters. He became proprietor in 1860 of the substantial Egmont Hotel in Kanturk through renting it from the estate of the Earl of Egmont.

Johnson played a prominent role from 1869 in the Amnesty Association established by Isaac Butt, campaigning for the release of Fenian prisoners. The association organised its first open-air rallies in Mallow and Skibbereen where Johnson displayed his fierce gift of oratory. He also addressed further pro-Fenian meetings, which included a commemoration at Kilclooney Wood, the site of the death of Peter O’Neill Crawley. He contributed letters to the weekly pro-Fenian The Irishman, as well as to the Cork Examiner, publicly advocating a republican form of government, but his exact relationship to the Irish Republican Brotherhood are unclear, often denying he was a sworn Fenian member.

== Political engagement ==
When Isaac Butt founded the Home Government Association in 1870, Johnson was active in its formation and campaigned for it in several elections always opposing the Gladstonian candidates. In October 1872 he, together with Butt and John Nolan, leader of the Amnesty Association, went on a speaking tour of Britain.

Johnson first turned to the concerns of labourers in 1869 when he co-founded in September the Kanturk Labourers’ Club, becoming its secretary in January 1870. It was the first body of its kind in the country which attempted to represent agricultural labourers. The club had several hundred members and attracted thousands to its rallies. It recruited its supporters largely from Fenian sympathisers.

Focused on calling for improvements to Gladstone's first Irish Land Act 1870, the club demanded that its legislation needed to incorporate provisions for housing and small holdings to be made available to labourers at a ‘fair rent’. On the other hand, the club discouraged conflict with tenant farmers over wage rates. Johnson attempted to organise clubs elsewhere in the country, with only limited success. This largely due to the labourers’ situation, although extremely discontent, they were widely dispersed and had irregular seasonal work patterns. Their dwindling numbers due to emigration and their limited vision made them difficult to organise. As a result, labourers’ organisations tended to be organised by agrarian activists and radicals such as Johnson, who were themselves not labourers.

== Labourers’ union ==
Together with Butt's Home Government Association, Johnson operated the club from 1871 as affiliated to it, but his more genuine commitment to the labourers’ cause and his belief that British radicals were natural allies of Irish republicans had him establish contact to the newly evolving National Agricultural Labourers Union (NALU) in Britain. A few of their activists came to Ireland to support him. At a meeting at Johnson's hotel in August 1873 attended by Butt and P. J. Smyth and some NALU representatives, the Irish Agricultural Labourers Union (IALU) was founded.

Despite some initial successes in Munster and Leinster, the home rule MPs though nominally its leaders, showed little interest in its activities so that by 1875 the IALU had faded away. Other reasons for this were that the IALU activities aroused conservative and clerical suspicion due to its nationalism and Fenian connection and the rhetoric of some of its speakers. This in turn led to a breakdown of relations with the NALU. Johnson began to suffer health problems after an accident and turned to advocating emigration to Canada, setting up an emigration business in his hotel.

== Labour league activist ==
During the Land War of the early 1880s Johnson was symbolically nominated to the founding executive of the Land League and was a leading activist in north Cork and the surrounding counties. When from December 1880 landlords attempted to encourage divisions between farmers and labourers, Johnson reactivated labourers’ organisations as a countermeasure to these attempts.

He then took a leading role in establishing a Munster Labour League at a conference in Limerick in May 1881. The league functioned as a pressure group within the Land League movement and campaigned for more attention to be given to the demands of labourers as well as betterment for small tenant farmers. It also acted as an umbrella, uniting the many local ‘labourer leagues’ which had sprung up spontaneously as a reaction to the agricultural crisis.

Many supporters advocated that he be returned to parliament, but it never came about, though the police regarded him as a candidate for arrest, which also didn't happen. From mid 1882 Johnson recognised that the national directory was neglecting the labourers’ needs and reducing their organisations to being mere subservient off-shoots of the Irish National League. He justifiably scaled back his political involvement and was never again prominent on a national level.

== Later years ==
Johnson bought his hotel and six acres of adjoining land in the 1890s and stayed in business in Kanturk until 1917. He remained an outspoken anti-Parnellite, though in the years prior to the first world war he nevertheless supported the local Redmonite faction against the All-for-Ireland League founded by his fellow townsman William O'Brien which was backed by the Kanturk founder of a newer labourers’ association, D. D. Sheehan.

It can be said of Johnson that he took a formative role in the creation of a form of ‘labour-nationalism’ centred in Munster committed to the well-being of the landless labourers, although he was primarily a believer in a cross class nationalist alliance rather than a trade unionist in the latter day sense of the word. His engagement played a notable, if sub-ordinate, part in nationalist politics throughout the home rule movement and had also some influence on the post-independence Labour Party.

After selling his hotel in 1917 he retired to live with his grandchildren in Clifden, County Galway, where he died 3 November 1926.
