= Sir David Roche, 1st Baronet =

Anglo-Irish politician

Sir David Roche, 1st Baronet (19 January 1791 – 8 April 1865) was an Irish politician.

Roche was the second member of parliament for the UK Parliament for the Limerick City constituency from 1832 until 1838. He was first elected as a candidate for the Repeal Association. (Note: "In fact there were 2,868 registered electors at the general election in December 1832, when, at O’Connell’s instigation, William Roche, by now a highly respected Catholic agitator, and his cousin David Roche were returned as Repealers after a contest.") Roche was re-elected in 1835 and 1837 as a candidate of a Liberal/Repealer pact.

The Roche Baronetcy, of Carass in Limerick, was created for him in the Baronetage of the United Kingdom on 8 August 1838. In 1847 he served as High Sheriff of County Limerick.

== Family ==
see

He was the son of David Roche of Carass, County Limerick, son of David Roche, Mayor of Limerick in 1749. His mother was Frances Maunsel of Limerick.

He married Frances Vandeleur on 14 February 1825. They had four daughters and one son, David Vandeleur Roche (b.1833).

His younger sister, Bridget Roche, married the infamous Neptune Blood, of Brickhill County Clare.

== Notes ==
Parliament of the United Kingdom
Preceded by Thomas Spring Rice	Member of Parliament for Limerick City; 1832–1844; With: William Roche to 1841; John O'Brien from 1841	Succeeded by James Kelly; John O'Brien
Baronetage of the United Kingdom
New creation	Baronet (of Carass); 1838–1865	Succeeded by David Vandeleur Roche
