= Michael Colivet =

Irish politician (1882–1955)

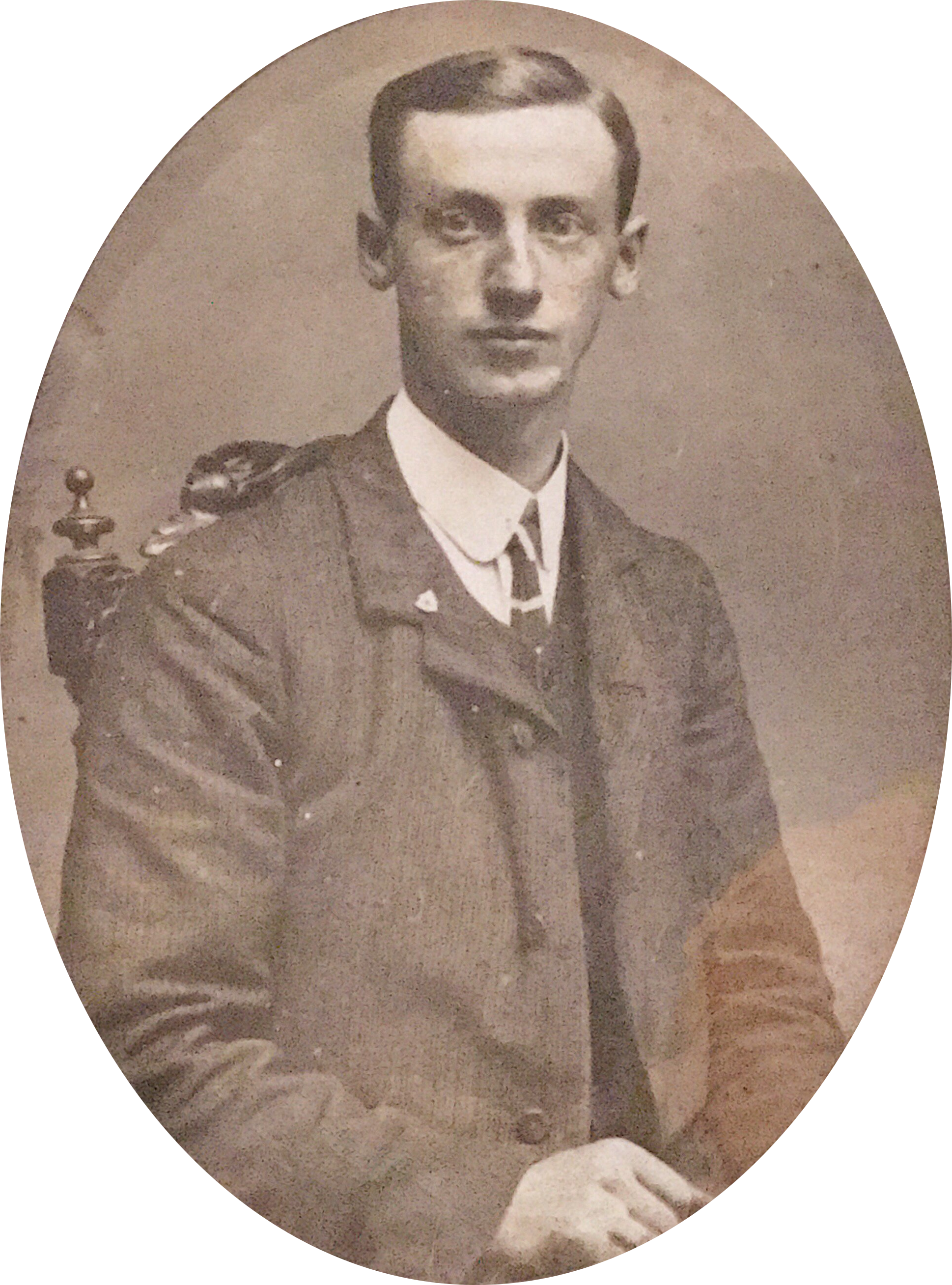
- Colivet, c.1920s

Teachta Dála
- In office May 1921 – August 1923
- Constituency: Limerick City–Limerick East
- In office December 1918 – May 1921
- Constituency: Limerick City

Personal details
- Born: 29 May 1884 Limerick, Ireland
- Died: 4 May 1955 (aged 70) Limerick, Ireland
- Party: Sinn Féin
- Education: St Joseph's Patrician College

Michael Patrick Colivet (29 May 1884 – 4 May 1955) was an Irish Sinn Féin politician. He was Commander of the Irish Volunteers in Limerick during the 1916 Easter Rising, and was elected to the First Dáil.

== Early life ==
Michael Patrick Colivet was born at 11 Windmill street in Limerick city. His father, John Colivet, was a Sea Captain from Jersey (of French origin), and his mother Anne Kinnerk was from Askeaton, County Limerick. Michael spent most of his formative years in Limerick. At age 12 his family moved to The Claddagh in Galway and he attended secondary school at St Joseph's Patrician College in Galway. The family lived in Galway until 1903 before returning to settle in Limerick.

== Political career ==
Colivet was Commandant of the Irish Volunteers for Limerick City and East Clare, and led the 1916 Easter Rising in Limerick. He was later arrested and interned for his part in the Rising.

In 1918 he was voted on to the Council for Limerick Corporation while he was jailed in Lincoln prison. Mayor O'Mara stated that the action was "a protest against the way Irishmen had been treated by the Government, who were filling the gaols with men who had the courage of their convictions". He remained an Alderman on the City Municipal (Glentworth and Shannon Wards) until 1925.

His cellmate at Lincoln prison was Éamon de Valera. De Valera, aided by Michael Collins and Harry Boland, famously escaped from Lincoln prison in 1919 with the help of a key made by Peter De Loughry.

=== Election to the First Dáil ===
He was elected as a Sinn Féin MP for the Limerick City constituency at the 1918 general election. In January 1919, Sinn Féin MPs refused to recognise the Parliament of the United Kingdom and instead assembled at the Mansion House in Dublin as a revolutionary parliament called Dáil Éireann. At the official roll call, Colivet was marked "fé ghlas ag Gallaibh" (imprisoned by the foreign enemy). Like many other elected Irish MPs he was interned in a British prison at the time.

On 14 April 1921 his treatment at Rathkeale prison was debated in the House of Commons - MPs questioned his cell conditions and if it was appropriate to carry around an elected MP, who was awaiting trial, as a hostage on British Army trucks. English journalist Wilfrid Ewart gives an interesting account of Ireland at that time, including a visit to Rathkeale prison and a meeting with Colivet, who was interned there in April 1921.

=== Stance on the Anglo-Irish Treaty ===
He was re-elected unopposed at the 1921 elections for the Limerick City–Limerick East constituency. He opposed the Anglo-Irish Treaty and voted against it, stating in the Dáil debate:

"I am now asked to throw out the Republican Government and accept the status of a Dominion within the British Empire. Many men can find it within themselves to reconcile such with their previous views and opinions whether they were expressed in oaths or in any other form whatsoever. That is their business. I am only concerned with mine, and my point of view is, I cannot do that thing. I have declared myself a Republican, and have been elected a Republican, and I will never willingly become a subject of the British Empire".

He was again re-elected unopposed at the 1922 general election as an anti-Treaty Sinn Féin Teachta Dála (TD) but did not take his seat in the Dáil as he did not recognise the legitimacy of the 3rd Dáil. He lost his seat at the 1923 general election.

In the Limerick Municipal elections of 1925, he stood for the Republican party in the Abbey and Castle Wards and was elected as a Councillor.

In 1926, many Anti-Treaty republicans decided to resume constitutional politics and founded the Fianna Fáil party. In 1927 they took the Oath of Allegiance and entered the Dáil. Colivet did not join Fianna Fáil as he refused to take the Oath of Allegiance, and soon after he retired from political life.

== Post-political life ==
He continued his work in Limerick as manager of the Shannon Foundry. He later moved to Dublin when he was appointed to the Civil Service as General Inspector of Housing in the Department of Local Government. He was Chairman of the National Housing Board and the Dublin Housing Committee of Inquiry (1939–43). The latter produced an influential report recommending the clearing of city slums in Dublin.

In later life he supported Clann na Poblachta for a time, as an alternative Republican party to Fianna Fáil. However he was disillusioned when they went into power with Fine Gael (and the other opposition parties) after the 1948 general election.

== Remembrance ==
Colivet was buried at Mount Jerome Cemetery in 1955. Many TDs were in attendance at his funeral including Éamon de Valera, Donogh O'Malley, Dan Breen and John Joe Sheehy. As reported in the Limerick Leader, a number of his close friends were killed in the struggle for independence, including George Clancy and Michael O'Callaghan. His first wife died while he was imprisoned on Spike Island, County Cork; he was denied release to attend the funeral. The paper also reported that Colivet fought on the Republican side during the Civil War, but "at no time did he entertain a feeling of bitterness to those who differed from him, and nothing caused him more sadness than the sundering of the grand bond of Irish unity".

Colivet Drive in Limerick city is named in his honour. In 2009, his son, Brian Colivet, donated Michael Colivet's volunteer uniform, and a number of other artefacts (including de Valera's shaving mug from Lincoln prison) to the Limerick City Museum in Limerick city.

Parliament of the United Kingdom
Preceded by Michael Joyce	Member of Parliament for Limerick City; 1918–1922	Constituency abolished
Oireachtas
New constituency	Teachta Dála for Limerick City; 1918–1921	Constituency abolished

Dáil	Election	Deputy (Party)	Deputy (Party)	Deputy (Party)	Deputy (Party)
2nd	1921	Richard Hayes (SF)	William Hayes (SF)	Kathleen O'Callaghan (SF)	Michael Colivet (SF)
3rd	1922	Richard Hayes (PT-SF)	William Hayes (PT-SF)	Kathleen O'Callaghan (AT-SF)	Michael Colivet (AT-SF)
4th	1923	Constituency abolished. See Limerick			
