= 1879 Limerick City by-election =

UK Parliamentary by-election

The 1879 Limerick City by-election was fought on 23 May 1879. The by-election was fought due to the death of the incumbent Home Rule MP, Isaac Butt. It was won by the Home Rule candidate Daniel Fitzgerald Gabbett.
