= James Kelly (Repeal Association politician) =

Irish politician

Member of Parliament for Limerick City
- In office 9 July 1844 – 6 August 1847 Serving with John O'Brien
- Preceded by: John O'Brien; David Roche
- Succeeded by: John O'Brien; John O'Connell

Personal details
- Born: James Michael Kelly; 2 February 1808
- Died: 18 August 1875 (aged 67)
- Party: Repeal Association
- Education: Trinity College, Dublin

James Michael Kelly (2 February 1808 – 18 August 1875) was an Irish Repeal Association politician.

He was educated at Trinity College, Dublin and also served on Limerick Town Council and as High Sheriff of County Limerick in 1841.

In 1834, he married Frances Maria Roche, daughter of Edward Roche of Trabolgan and Kildinan and Margaret Honoria née Curtain, with whom he had at least one child: John Joseph Roche Kelly (1835–1898).

Kelly was first elected MP for Limerick City at a by-election in 1844—caused by the resignation of David Roche—and held the seat until 1847 when he did not seek re-election.

Parliament of the United Kingdom
Preceded by John O'Brien; David Roche	Member of Parliament for Limerick City; 1844–1847; With: John O'Brien	Succeeded by John O'Brien; John O'Connell
