= Limerick City (UK Parliament constituency) =

UK parliamentary constituency in Ireland, 1801–1922

- Former borough constituency for the House of Commons
- County: County Limerick
- Borough: Limerick

1801–1922
- Seats: 1 (1801–1832); 2 (1832–1885); 1 (1885–1922)
- Created from: Limerick City (IHC)
- Replaced by: Limerick City–Limerick East

Limerick City was a United Kingdom Parliament constituency in Ireland. It returned one MP 1801–1832, two MPs 1832–1885 and one thereafter. It was an original constituency represented in Parliament when the Union of Great Britain and Ireland took effect on 1 January 1801. It ceased to be represented in the United Kingdom Parliament in 1922.

== History ==
Its first MP in 1801 was chosen by lot. It received a second MP under the Representation of the People (Ireland) Act 1832. It was reduced to one MP again under the Redistribution of Seats Act 1885. At the 1918 general election, Sinn Féin used it as the basis of membership of the Dáil Éireann, with Michael Colivet sitting in the First Dáil.

Under the Government of Ireland Act 1920, the area was part of a 4-seat constituency of Borough of Limerick–Limerick East for the Southern Ireland House of Commons and a single-seat constituency at Westminster. At the 1921 Southern Ireland House of Commons election, the four seats were won uncontested by Sinn Féin, who treated it as part of the election to the Second Dáil. Colivet was among the four elected in 1921. It was never used as a Westminster constituency; under s. 1(4) of the Irish Free State (Agreement) Act 1922, no writ was to be issued "for a constituency in Ireland other than a constituency in Northern Ireland". Therefore, after the House of Commons was dissolved on 26 October 1922, no vote was held in Borough of Limerick–Limerick East at the 1922 United Kingdom general election on 15 November 1922, shortly before the Irish Free State left the United Kingdom on 6 December 1922.

== Boundaries ==
This was a borough constituency, comprising the parliamentary borough of Limerick in County Limerick. The boundary commissioners indicated in their report of January 1832 that they were not authorised to propose a curtailment in the boundaries. It was defined by the Parliamentary Boundaries (Ireland) Act 1832 as: "The County of the City of Limerick".

Under the Representation of the People (Ireland) Act 1868, its boundaries were defined to include all of the municipal borough of Limerick. This had been defined in the Municipal Corporations (Ireland) Act 1840 as:

From the Point at the North of King's Island where the Salmon Weir River flows from the Shannon; thence along the Course of the Shannon to the North-east; and thence, Southward, to the Point at which the same is joined by the Head of the Canal; thence Westward, along the Canal to the Centre of Park Bridge, which crosses the Canal; thence in a straight Line to the Centre of the Cupola upon the Top of the Lunatic Asylum; thence, in a straight Line and South-westerly Direction, to the Point in the Roxborough Road where it is met by Wilmont Lane; thence along Wilmont Lane to the West Pier of a Gate belonging to Mr. Maloney on North Side of said Lane, and nearly opposite to Wilmot Villa; thence, in a straight Line and North-westerly Direction, across Mr. Maloney's Field and Two other Fields, till it reaches the Extremity of a small Lane; thence, continuing along said Lane, past the Limestone Quarry of William Hargan, until it reaches Bohirboy Road; thence, Westerly, along Bohirboy Road till it reaches Hore's Street; thence, North-westerly, along Hore's Street to the South Circular Road; thence, North-easterly, about Twenty-three Yards along the Circular Road to where Court Brack Avenue leads off North-westerly; thence, North-westerly, along Court Brack Avenue till it reaches Harvey's Quay situated at the End of the said Avenue; thence in a straight Line across the Shannon to Barrington's Quay upon the Clare Side near the old Ruins of Kilrush Church; thence, about Two hundred Yards, North-easterly, along Barrington's Quay, to the North Circular Road; thence, North-westerly, and following the Direction of the Circular Road to where it meets the Shelbourne and Farrenshowen Roads; thence along the Farrenshowen Road to where it crosses the new Ennis Mail Road at nearly Half a Mile from Wellesley Bridge; thence continuing about One hundred Yards up the Farrenshowen Road to where there is a Cottage at a Turn in the Road; thence in a straight Line to the Point where the Killaloe Road meets the old North Ennis Road; thence along the Killaloe Road to the Point where it meets the Black Stick Road; thence in a straight Line to the Point first described.

After 1885, it was south of East Clare but was otherwise surrounded by East Limerick.

== Members of Parliament ==
=== One member 1801–1832 ===
Election	Member	Party	Note
1801, 1 January	Henry Deane Grady		1801: Co-opted
1802, 16 July	Charles Vereker	Tory	Succeeded as the 2nd Viscount Gort
1817, 25 July	Hon. John Vereker	Tory	Unseated on petition
1820, 3 July	Thomas Spring Rice	Whig	Declared duly elected
1832	Constituency allocated two seats		

=== Two members 1832–1885 ===
Election	First member	First party	Second member	Second party
1832, 21 December	William Roche	Repeal Association	Sir David Roche, Bt ^{a}	Repeal Association
1841, 6 July	John O'Brien	Radical	Sir David Roche, Bt ^{a}	Repeal Association
1844, 9 July	John O'Brien	Radical	James Kelly	Repeal Association
1847, 6 August	John O'Brien	Repeal Association	John O'Connell ^{a}	Repeal Association
1851, 1 August	John O'Brien	Repeal Association	Henry Fitzalan-Howard	Independent Whig
1852, 15 July	Robert Potter ^{b}	Ind. Irish	Francis William Russell ^{b}	Whig
1854, 28 October	James O'Brien ^{c}	Whig	Francis William Russell ^{b}	Whig
1858, 15 February	George Gavin ^{d}	Ind. Irish	Francis William Russell ^{b}	Whig
1858, 21 May	James Spaight	Conservative	Francis William Russell ^{b}	Whig
1859, 5 May	George Gavin	Liberal	Francis William Russell ^{b}	Liberal
1871, 20 September	George Gavin	Liberal	Isaac Butt	Home Rule League
1874, 5 February	Richard O'Shaughnessy ^{e}	Home Rule League	Isaac Butt	Home Rule League
1879, 20 September	Richard O'Shaughnessy ^{e}	Home Rule League	Daniel Fitzgerald Gabbett	Home Rule League
1883, 16 November	Edward McMahon	Home Rule League	Daniel Fitzgerald Gabbett	Home Rule League
1885	Constituency allocated one seat			

Notes:-

- ^{a} Resigned.
- ^{b} Died.
- ^{c} Appointed a Judge of the Irish Court of Queen's Bench.
- ^{d} Unseated on petition and new writ issued.
- ^{e} Appointed Registrar of Petty Sessions Clerk.

=== One member 1885–1922 ===
Election	Member	Party
1885, 27 November	Henry Joseph Gill	Irish Parliamentary
1888, 17 April	Francis Arthur O'Keefe	Irish Parliamentary
1892, 7 July	Francis Arthur O'Keefe	Irish National Federation
1895, 13 July	John Daly	Irish National League
1895, 11 September	Francis Arthur O'Keefe	Irish National Federation
1900, 4 October	Michael Joyce	Irish Parliamentary Party
1918, 14 December	Michael Colivet	Sinn Féin
1922	Constituency abolished	

== Elections ==
In 1801–1832 and 1885–1922 the constituency used the first past the post electoral system to fill its one seat. In 1832–1885 the block vote was used to elect two members and first past the post to return one member at by-elections.

=== Elections in the 1830s ===
General election 1830: Limerick City
Party	Candidate	Votes	%
Whig	Thomas Spring Rice	796	62.1
Repeal	Samuel Dickson	485	37.9
Majority		311	24.2
Turnout		1,281	c. 40.0
Registered electors		c. 3,200	
Whig hold			

General election 1831: Limerick City
Party	Candidate	Votes	%
Whig	Thomas Spring Rice	Unopposed	
Registered electors		3,200	
Whig hold			

General election 1832: Limerick City
Party	Candidate	Votes	%
Repeal	William Roche (Irish politician)	1,648	38.1
Repeal	David Roche	1,285	29.7
Tory	John Vereker	1,105	25.5
Repeal	Samuel Dickson	184	4.3
Tory	Ralph Westropp	104	2.4
Majority		180	4.2
Turnout		2,444	85.2
Registered electors		2,868	
Repeal gain from Whig			
Repeal win (new seat)			

General election 1835: Limerick City
Party	Candidate	Votes	%
Repeal (Whig)	William Roche (Irish politician)	Unopposed	
Repeal (Whig)	David Roche	Unopposed	
Registered electors		2,976	
Repeal hold			
Repeal hold			

General election 1837: Limerick City
Party	Candidate	Votes	%
Repeal (Whig)	William Roche (Irish politician)	973	40.2
Repeal (Whig)	David Roche	960	39.7
Conservative	William Monsell	387	16.0
Conservative	Thomas Wilson	101	4.2
Majority		573	23.7
Turnout		1,355	38.3
Registered electors		3,534	
Repeal hold			
Repeal hold			

=== Elections in the 1840s ===
General election 1841: Limerick City
Party	Candidate	Votes	%	±%
Radical	John O'Brien	Unopposed		
Repeal	David Roche	Unopposed		
Registered electors		1,893		
Radical gain from Repeal				
Repeal hold				

Roche resigned by accepting the office of Steward of the Chiltern Hundreds, causing a by-election.

By-election, 9 July 1844: Limerick City
Party	Candidate	Votes	%	±%
Repeal	James Kelly	Unopposed		
Repeal hold				

General election 1847: Limerick City
Party	Candidate	Votes	%	±%
Repeal	John O'Connell	583	50.4	N/A
Repeal	John O'Brien	537	46.4	N/A
Irish Confederate	Richard O'Gorman	37	3.2	New
Majority		500	43.2	N/A
Turnout		579 (est)	28.1 (est)	N/A
Registered electors		2,063		
Repeal hold		Swing	N/A	
Repeal gain from Radical		Swing	N/A	

=== Elections in the 1850s ===
O'Connell resigned by accepting the office of Steward of the Chiltern Hundreds, causing a by-election.

By-election, 1 August 1851: Limerick City
Party	Candidate	Votes	%	±%
Independent Whig	Henry Fitzalan-Howard	Unopposed		
Independent Whig gain from Repeal				

General election 1852: Limerick City
Party	Candidate	Votes	%	±%
Independent Irish	Robert Potter	512	33.6	N/A
Whig	Francis William Russell	461	30.2	N/A
Whig	James O'Brien	457	30.0	N/A
Irish Conservative	Thadeus McDonnell	94	6.2	New
Turnout		762 (est)	66.6 (est)	+35.5
Registered electors		1,144		
Majority		55	3.6	N/A
Independent Irish gain from Repeal		Swing		
Majority		367	24.0	N/A
Whig gain from Independent Whig				

Potter's death caused a by-election.

By-election, 28 October 1854: Limerick City
Party	Candidate	Votes	%	±%
Whig	James O'Brien	Unopposed		
Whig gain from Independent Irish				

General election 1857: Limerick City
Party	Candidate	Votes	%	±%
Whig	Francis William Russell	Unopposed		
Whig	James O'Brien	Unopposed		
Registered electors		1,913		
Whig hold				
Whig gain from Independent Irish				

O'Brien resigned after being appointed a judge of the Queen's Bench, causing a by-election.

By-election, 15 February 1858: Limerick City
Party	Candidate	Votes	%	±%
Independent Irish	George Gavin	782	51.6	New
Whig	John Ball	733	48.4	N/A
Majority		49	3.2	N/A
Turnout		1,515	79.2	N/A
Registered electors		1,913		
Independent Irish gain from Whig		Swing	N/A	

On petition, Gavin was unseated, causing a by-election.

By-election, 21 May 1858: Limerick City
Party	Candidate	Votes	%	±%
Irish Conservative	James Spaight	Unopposed		
Irish Conservative gain from Whig				

General election 1859: Limerick City
Party	Candidate	Votes	%	±%
Liberal	Francis William Russell	1,208	41.4	N/A
Liberal	George Gavin	902	30.9	N/A
Irish Conservative	James Spaight	807	27.7	New
Majority		95	3.2	N/A
Turnout		1,458 (est)	72.4 (est)	N/A
Registered electors		2,013		
Liberal hold		Swing	N/A	
Liberal gain from Irish Conservative		Swing	N/A	

=== Elections in the 1860s ===
General election 1865: Limerick City
Party	Candidate	Votes	%	±%
Liberal	George Gavin	1,004	40.1	+9.2
Liberal	Francis William Russell	838	33.5	−7.9
Irish Conservative	James Spaight	658	26.3	−1.4
Irish Conservative	Josh Seaward	4	0.2	N/A
Majority		180	7.2	+4.0
Turnout		1,579 (est)	78.8 (est)	+6.4
Registered electors		2,005		
Liberal hold		Swing	+5.0	
Liberal hold		Swing	−3.6	

General election 1868: Limerick City
Party	Candidate	Votes	%	±%
Liberal	George Gavin	1,026	37.6	−2.5
Liberal	Francis William Russell	794	29.1	−4.4
Liberal-Conservative	Peter Tait	720	26.4	N/A
Ind. Nationalist	Richard Pigott	187	6.9	New
Majority		74	2.7	−5.5
Turnout		1,364 (est)	67.1 (est)	−11.7
Registered electors		2,032		
Liberal hold		Swing		
Liberal hold		Swing		

=== Elections in the 1870s ===
Russell's death caused a by-election.

By-election, 20 Sep 1871: Limerick City
Party	Candidate	Votes	%	±%
Home Rule	Isaac Butt	Unopposed		
Registered electors		2,193		
Home Rule gain from Liberal				

General election 1874: Limerick City
Party	Candidate	Votes	%	±%
Home Rule	Isaac Butt	856	30.3	N/A
Home Rule	Richard O'Shaughnessy	848	30.0	N/A
Irish Conservative	James Spaight	587	20.8	New
Home Rule	Peter Tait	291	10.3	−16.1
Home Rule	Charles Smyth Vereker	242	8.6	N/A
Majority		261	9.2	N/A
Turnout		1,706 (est)	85.1 (est)	+18.0
Registered electors		2,004		
Home Rule gain from Liberal				
Home Rule gain from Liberal				

Butt's death caused a by-election.

By-election, 23 May 1879: Limerick City
Party	Candidate	Votes	%	±%
Home Rule	Daniel Fitzgerald Gabbett	860	56.7	−22.5
Irish Conservative	James Spaight	658	43.3	+22.5
Majority		202	13.4	+4.2
Turnout		1,518	78.7	−6.4
Registered electors		1,930		
Home Rule hold		Swing	−22.5	

=== Elections in the 1880s ===
General election 1880: Limerick City
Party	Candidate	Votes	%	±%
Home Rule	Richard O'Shaughnessy	1,109	40.8	+10.8
Home Rule	Daniel Fitzgerald Gabbett	989	36.4	+6.1
Irish Conservative	James Spaight	620	22.8	+2.0
Majority		369	13.6	+4.4
Turnout		1,729 (est)	89.4 (est)	+4.3
Registered electors		1,934		
Home Rule hold		Swing	+4.9	
Home Rule hold		Swing	+3.6	

O'Shaughnessy resigned after being appointed a registrar of petty sessions clerk, causing a by-election.

By-election, 16 Nov 1883: Limerick City
Party	Candidate	Votes	%	±%
Irish Parliamentary	Edward McMahon	922	66.1	−11.1
Irish Conservative	James Spaight	473	33.9	+11.1
Majority		449	32.2	+18.6
Turnout		1,395	71.0	−18.4 (est)
Registered electors		1,964		
Irish Parliamentary hold		Swing	+11.1	

For the 1885 election, the seat was reduced to one MP.

1885 general election: Limerick City
Party	Candidate	Votes	%	±%
Irish Parliamentary	Henry Joseph Gill	3,098	83.0	+5.8
Irish Conservative	James Spaight	635	17.0	−5.8
Majority		2,463	66.0	+52.4
Turnout		3,733	62.1	−27.3 (est)
Registered electors		6,010		
Irish Parliamentary hold		Swing	+5.8	

1886 general election: Limerick City
Party	Candidate	Votes	%	±%
Irish Parliamentary	Henry Joseph Gill	Unopposed		
Irish Parliamentary hold				

By-election 1888: Limerick City
Party	Candidate	Votes	%	±%
Irish Parliamentary	Francis Arthur O'Keefe	Unopposed		
Irish Parliamentary hold				

=== Elections in the 1890s ===
1892 general election: Limerick City
Party	Candidate	Votes	%	±%
Irish National Federation	Francis Arthur O'Keefe	1,878	55.8	N/A
Irish National League	Pat O'Brien	1,490	44.2	N/A
Majority		388	11.6	N/A
Turnout		3,368	66.2	N/A
Registered electors		5,084		
Irish National Federation gain from Irish Parliamentary		Swing	N/A	

1895 general election: Limerick City
Party	Candidate	Votes	%	±%
Irish National League	John Daly	Unopposed		
Irish National League gain from Irish National Federation				

Daly, who was serving a term of life imprisonment, was elected unopposed after the Official Nationalist candidate (O'Keefe) withdrew in his favour. As a convicted felon, Daly was not eligible to sit in the House of Commons, and the election was declared void.

By-election, 1895: Limerick City
Party	Candidate	Votes	%	±%
Irish National Federation	Francis Arthur O'Keefe	1,851	51.2	N/A
Irish National League	Joseph Nolan	1,764	48.8	N/A
Majority		87	2.4	N/A
Turnout		3,615	66.9	N/A
Registered electors		5,407		
Irish National Federation gain from Irish National League		Swing	N/A	

=== Elections in the 1900s ===
1900 general election: Limerick City
Party	Candidate	Votes	%	±%
Irish Parliamentary	Michael Joyce	2,521	84.2	N/A
Irish Unionist	Francis Edgar Kearney	474	15.8	New
Majority		2,047	68.4	N/A
Turnout		2,995	68.3	N/A
Registered electors		5,297		
Irish Parliamentary hold		Swing		

1906 general election: Limerick City
Party	Candidate	Votes	%	±%
Irish Parliamentary	Michael Joyce	Unopposed		
Irish Parliamentary hold				

=== Elections in the 1910s ===
January 1910 general election: Limerick City
Party	Candidate	Votes	%	±%
Irish Parliamentary	Michael Joyce	2,137	68.7	N/A
All-for-Ireland	John Rice	973	31.3	New
Majority		1,164	37.4	N/A
Turnout		3,110	66.4	N/A
Registered electors		4,686		
Irish Parliamentary hold		Swing	N/A	

December 1910 general election: Limerick City
Party	Candidate	Votes	%	±%
Irish Parliamentary	Michael Joyce	2,452	78.2	+9.5
All-for-Ireland	John Rice	682	21.8	−9.5
Majority		1,770	56.4	+19.0
Turnout		3,134	66.9	+0.5
Registered electors		4,686		
Irish Parliamentary hold		Swing	+9.5	

1918 general election: Limerick City
Party	Candidate	Votes	%	±%
Sinn Féin	Michael Colivet	Unopposed		
Sinn Féin gain from Irish Parliamentary				

== See also ==
- List of UK Parliament Constituencies in Ireland and Northern Ireland
