= John Daly (Fenian) =

Irish Republican and Fenian

John Daly Seán Ó Dálaigh
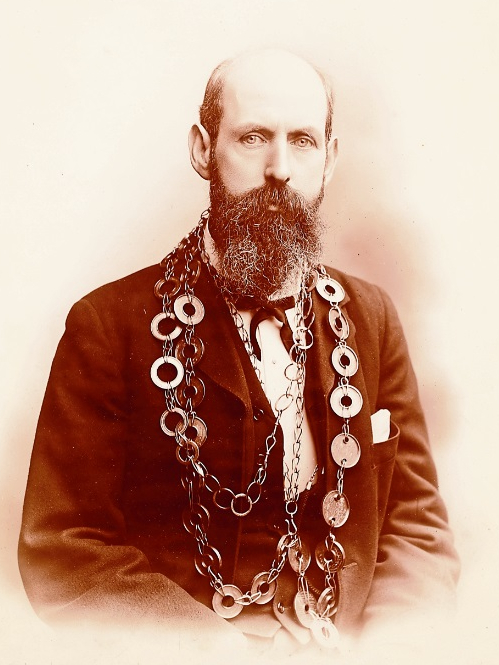
- Daly as the Mayor of Limerick, c. 1900

Member of Parliament for Limerick City
- In office August 1895 – 1895
- Preceded by: Francis Arthur O'Keefe
- Succeeded by: Francis Arthur O'Keefe

Mayor of Limerick
- In office 1899–1901
- Preceded by: Michael Cusack
- Succeeded by: James F. Barry

Personal details
- Born: 18 October 1845 Limerick City, County Limerick, Ireland
- Died: 30 June 1916 (aged 70) Ireland
- Party: Irish National League
- Relatives: Ned Daly; Kathleen Clarke

Military service
- Allegiance: Irish Republican Brotherhood
- Battles/wars: Fenian Rising of 1867

John Daly (18 October 1845 – 30 June 1916) was an Irish republican and a leading member of the Irish Republican Brotherhood. He was uncle to Kathleen Clarke, wife of Tom Clarke, who was executed for his part in the 1916 Rising and who was a leading member of the IRB, and her brother Ned Daly who was also executed in 1916. Daly briefly served as a member of the British Parliament but was resented for having previously been convicted for treason against the British state. Daly also served as Mayor of Limerick for 3 years at the turn of the century.

== Early life ==
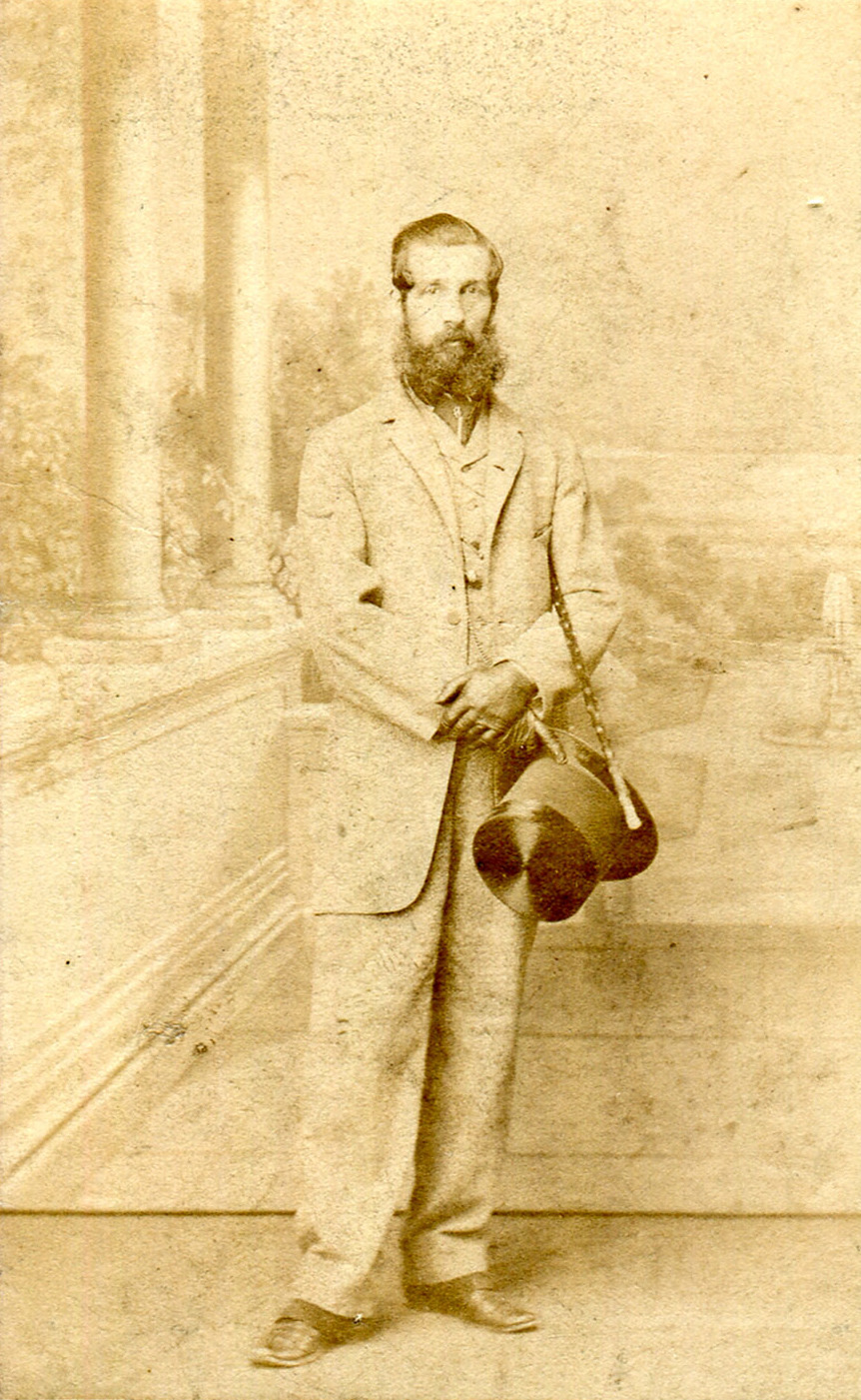
Daly as a young man

John Daly was born in Limerick city on 18 October 1845. His father, worked in James Harvey & Son's Timber Yard. At 16 John joined his father working as a lath splitter. At 18 he was sworn in as a member of the Irish Republican Brotherhood, also known as the Fenians, and became fully involved in Republican activities. When he was refused absolution in confession because he admitted to being a Fenian, he decided that from then on his loyalty would no longer be to "faith and Fatherland" but to "God and Fatherland."

On 22 November 1866, Daly and his brother Edward were arrested at their family home, having been betrayed by an informer, for running a munitions factory in the Pennywell district close to their home. He was released on bail in February 1867, toughened and more dedicated by the experience.

== 1867 Rising ==
On 5 March 1867 the ill-prepared Fenian Rising took place. John Daly took charge of the Limerick detachment of the IRB. Limerick was one of the few areas were the Fenians were able to make some show of force, however weak. Through lack of numbers they failed to make a significant impact on the vastly superior forces arrayed against them. Moving out of the city, Daly moved his men into the country and joined up with other Fenians in an attack on the Irish Constabulary barracks at Kilmallock. The attack was repelled, and Daly dispersed his men.

After this, Daly had to flee the country by stowing away, first on a boat the Hollywood, to England, and from London then on board the Cornelius Grenfel to the United States of America.

== America ==
Life in America for working-class immigrants was particularly tough, and his first job on leaving the ship was digging a cellar. He then obtained work in a white lead factory and worked for a while as a mason's helper before getting a reasonably good job as a brakeman on a tram system. Daly was to recall these experiences in his Recollections of Fenians and Fenianism.

== Amnesty Association ==
In 1869, Daly returned to Ireland and took up his old job in the timber yard, and also his Republican activities. He began to help reorganise the IRB and took participated in various agitations to keep the IRB agenda in the public view. He became a leading voice in the Amnesty Association to help in the release of those Fenians still in jail.

In November 1869, a major tenants' rights meeting took place in the city. The IRB objected to the meeting because the issue of the prisoners was not on the agenda. In what became known as "The Battle of the Markets" the IRB charged the platform and succeeded in dismantling it. Though the organisers of the meeting attempted to hold some form of gathering, Daly and the IRB refused to relent. It was Daly's opinion that "it was one of the greatest moral victories ever achieved". The issue of political prisoners kept Daly occupied for much of the 1870s. In 1876, Daly was again arrested for disrupting another home rule gathering, though on being brought before the court he was acquitted.

During the Land War, Daly was a member of the Supreme Council of the IRB and served as an organiser for Connacht and Ulster.

== Arrest ==
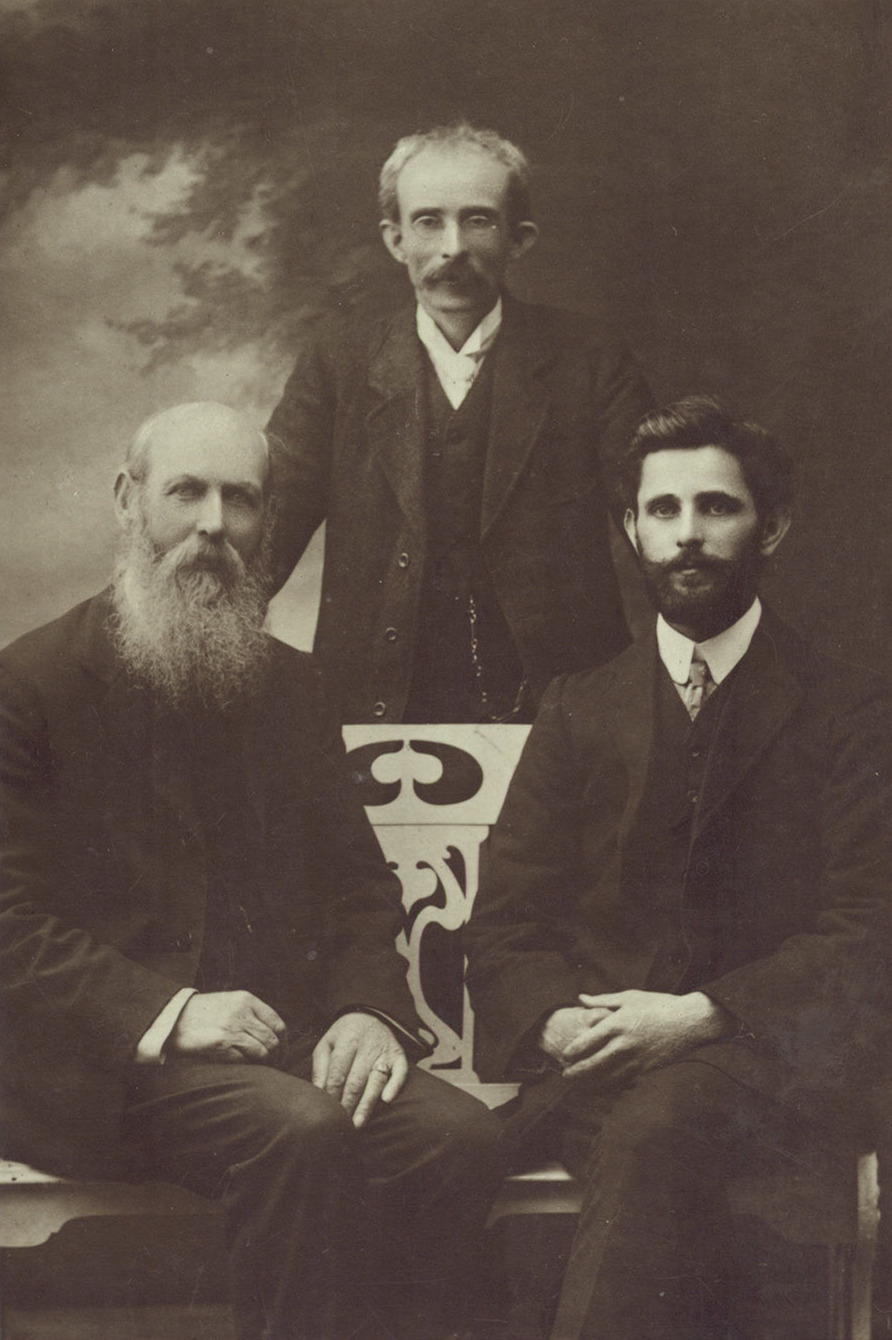
Daly alongside fellow members of the Irish Republican Brotherhood Tom Clarke and Seán Mac Diarmada

In the summer of 1883, Daly, moved to Birmingham, England, and settled in the home of James Egan, an old friend from Limerick and a generally inactive IRB man. E.G. Jenkinson, head of Special Branch, was informed that John Daly was on his way to Britain from America; Daly had been asked by the Supreme Council to deliver the graveside oration at the funeral of Charles J. Kickham while in the United States. When Daly arrived, a plain-clothes detective was assigned to follow him at all times. As a result of this, Special Branch as alerted to the importance of John Torley in Glasgow, Robert Johnston in Belfast and Mark Ryan in London of the IRB.

Jenkinson used agents provocateurs in his attempts to convict Republicans. One such recruit was a publican and local IRB man named Dan O'Neill. Both Jenkinson and Major Nicholas Gosselin persuaded O'Neill to betray Daly. O'Neill then asked Daly to deliver sealed cases to some associates in London, and on 11 April, Daly was arrested as he was about to board the train for London, and explosives were found in the case he was carrying. The police then raided the home of James Egan where explosives were "allegedly found buried" in Egan's garden in addition to some documents.

In Chatham prison, he became friends with Tom Clarke, who would later marry his niece Kathleen and who was a leader of the 1916 Easter Rising. While in prison he claimed that he was being poisoned with belladonna which caused an investigation by a commission of inquiry in 1890; it was admitted by prison officials as an error by a warder. A series of articles in the Daily Chronicle in 1894 analysed prison methods. Daly gave an interview to the Chronicle which appeared on 12 September 1896.

== Released ==
Daly was unopposed elected as a member of parliament (MP) for Limerick City at the general election in July 1895, as a member of the Parnellite Irish National League. However, he was disqualified on 19 August 1895 as a treason-felon. In August 1896, he went on a lecture tour of England with Maud Gonne and in 1897 on a tour of American which was organised by John Devoy. He later founded a prosperous bakery business in Limerick, and went on to become Mayor of his native city.

== Mayor of Limerick ==
John Daly was elected three times as Mayor of Limerick City, from 1899 to 1901. He jointly financed with Patrick McCartan the IRB newspaper Irish Freedom in 1910.

== The Daly Cup ==
In 1928, Madge Daly, a niece of John Daly, presented the Daly cup to William P. Clifford, the then-chairman of the Limerick GAA county board. Since then, the Daly cup is presented to the winners of the Limerick Senior Hurling Championship.

== Sources ==
- D.J. Hickey & J.E. Doherty (2003), A new Dictionary of Irish History from 1800, Gill & Macmillan, ISBN 0-7171-2520-3
- Ciarán Ó Gríofa, John Daly, The Fenian Mayor of Limerick
- Owen McGee (2005), The IRB: The Irish Republican Brotherhood from The Land League to Sinn Féin, Four Courts Press, ISBN 1-85182-972-5
- Fenian Memories, Dr. Mark F. Ryan, M. H. Gill & Son, Ltd, Dublin, 1945
- Irish Political Prisoners,1848-1922, Theatres of War, Sean McConville, 2003, pps, 365, 377.

Parliament of the United Kingdom
Preceded by Francis Arthur O'Keefe	Member of Parliament for Limerick City; 1895 – 1895	Succeeded by Francis Arthur O'Keefe
