= Kathleen Clarke =

Irish politician (1878–1972)

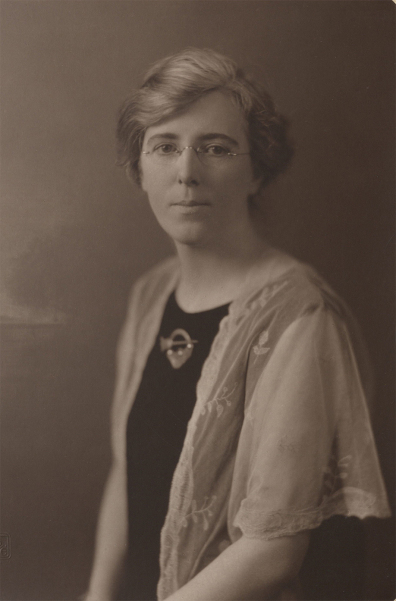
- Clarke in 1924

Lord Mayor of Dublin
- In office June 1939 – June 1941
- Preceded by: Alfie Byrne
- Succeeded by: Peadar Doyle

Dublin Corporation
- In office 1930–1942

Senator
- In office 12 December 1928 – 29 May 1936

Teachta Dála
- In office June 1927 – September 1927
- Constituency: Dublin North
- In office May 1921 – June 1922
- Constituency: Dublin Mid

Personal details
- Born: Kathleen Daly; 12 April 1878 Limerick, Ireland
- Died: 29 September 1972 (aged 94) Liverpool, England
- Resting place: Deans Grange Cemetery, Dublin, Ireland
- Party: Sinn Féin (1917–26); Fianna Fáil (1926–41); Clann na Poblachta (1948)
- Spouse: Tom Clarke (m. 1901; died 1916)
- Children: 3

Military service
- Allegiance: Cumann na mBan

Kathleen Clarke (née Daly; Irish: Caitlín Bean Uí Chléirigh; 12 April 1878 – 29 September 1972) was a founder member of Cumann na mBan, a women's paramilitary organisation formed in Ireland in 1914, and one of very few people privy to the plans of the Easter Rising in 1916. She was the wife of Tom Clarke and sister of Ned Daly, both of whom were executed for their part in the Rising. She was subsequently a Teachta Dála (TD) and Senator with both Sinn Féin and Fianna Fáil, and the first female Lord Mayor of Dublin (1939–1941).

== Early life ==
Kathleen Daly was born in Limerick on 12 April 1878, the third daughter of Edward and Catherine Daly (née O'Mara). She was born into a prominent Fenian family. Her paternal uncle, John Daly, a subsequent Mayor of Limerick, was at the time imprisoned in Chatham and Portland prisons in England for his political activities. Her uncle was released in 1896 and returned home to Limerick. At this time Kathleen had started a drapery business having previously begun an apprenticeship. When Tom Clarke, who had been imprisoned with her uncle, was released in 1898, he travelled to Limerick to receive the Freedom of the city and stayed with the Daly family.

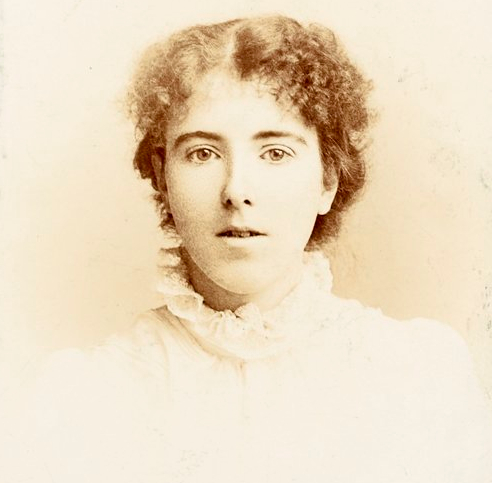
Portrait photograph of Clarke, taken c. 1900

In 1901 she ceased her business in the city, for she had decided to emigrate to the United States to join Tom who had been there since 1900, having secured work through his Fenian contacts. They married on 16 July 1901 in New York City, and lived in both the Bronx and Brooklyn areas of the city. They had three children together. Through his contacts in the Clan na Gael and the Irish Republican Brotherhood (IRB), Tom Clarke continued to be involved in nationalist activity. Kathleen joined the Gaelic League while in the US; they returned to Ireland in November 1907. They opened a tobacconist shop, initially at 55 Amiens Street, and later a second at 75a Great Britain (now Parnell) Street, which they ran together.

== Cumann na mBan ==
In 1914 she became a founding member of Cumann na mBan. Her husband forbade her to take an active part in the 1916 Easter Rising, for she had orders regardless of how the events would unfold. As Tom Clarke was the first signatory of the Proclamation of the Irish Republic, he was chosen to be executed for his part in the Easter Rising. Kathleen's younger brother, Ned Daly, was also executed for taking part in the Rising. She visited both of them before they were executed. Kathleen was pregnant at the time but subsequently lost the baby. She was committed to a long-term struggle for Irish independence: "Other risings left only despair, and efforts towards freedom left to the next generation. I would make every effort to keep the ball rolling, and in some way continue the fight for freedom, and not let it end with the Rising." After the Rising, Michael Collins established contact with her while in prison in his attempts to re-build the IRB network. She also set up the Irish National Aid Fund to aid those who had family members killed or imprisoned as a result of the Easter Rising, closely aided by Sorcha MacMahon.

== Political career ==
=== Sinn Féin ===
She became a member of Sinn Féin and in 1917 was elected a member of the party's Executive. In 1918 (during the alleged "German Plot") she was arrested and imprisoned in Holloway Prison for eleven months. Imprisoned in Holloway along with Clarke were several women Irish Republican leaders: Maud Gonne, Constance Markievicz and Hanna Sheehy-Skeffington. During the Irish War of Independence she served as a District Judge on the Republican Courts in Dublin. In 1919 she was elected as an Alderman for the Wood Quay and Mountjoy Wards of Dublin Corporation and served until the corporation was abolished in 1925. She was also active in the Irish White Cross.

She was elected unopposed as a Sinn Féin Teachta Dála (TD) to the Second Dáil at the 1921 elections for Dublin Mid. She argued against the Anglo-Irish Treaty in the Dáil debates in December 1921 and January 1922. She was not re-elected at the 1922 general election, and supported the Anti-Treaty IRA during the Irish Civil War. She was arrested briefly by the Garda Síochána during this time, and her shop in D'Olier Street, Dublin, was frequently raided. Clarke was later awarded a pension by the Irish government under the Military Service Pensions Act 1934 for her service with Cumann na mBan between 1916 and 1923.

=== Fianna Fáil ===
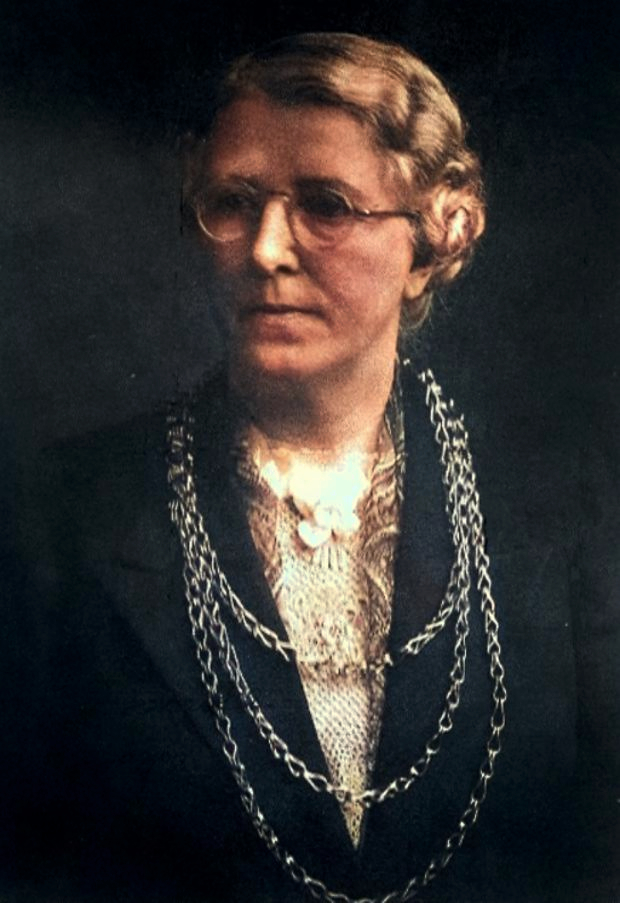
Clarke was the first woman to be Lord Mayor of Dublin in 1939

In 1926 she became a founder member of Fianna Fáil and had to resign from Cumann na mBan. She was re-elected to the short-lived 5th Dáil at the June 1927 election as a Fianna Fáil member for the Dublin North constituency, but lost her seat at the September 1927 election and did not regain it at the 1928 by-election. She was elected as one of six Fianna Fáil Senators to the Free State Seanad (Senate) for nine years at the 1928 Seanad election under the leadership of Joseph Connolly. She remained a member of the Seanad until it was abolished in 1936.

==== First woman to be Lord Mayor of Dublin ====
In 1930 she was elected to the re-constituted Dublin Corporation for Fianna Fáil along with Robert Briscoe, Seán T. O'Kelly, Thomas Kelly and Oscar Traynor. She served as the first Fianna Fáil Lord Mayor of Dublin, and the first female Lord Mayor, from 1939 to 1941. She opposed the Constitution of Ireland, for she felt that several of its sections would place women in a lower position than they had been afforded in the Proclamation of the Irish Republic. Following correspondence with Hanna Sheehy-Skeffington, she made her feelings public in the press. She was criticised by many in Fianna Fáil as a result and, while she resigned from the Thomas Clarke Cumann she remained a member of the Fianna Fáil Ard Chomhairle (national executive committee). She had previously opposed the Conditions of Employment Bill in the Seanad in 1935. While she did not support the IRA bombing campaign in England during World War II, she appealed for IRA men sentenced to death by the Irish courts to be granted clemency. Ultimately, this led to her breaking with the party completely after her term as Lord Mayor had finished in 1941. She also opposed the perceived centralisation of local government and the increased power of County and City Managers which had been introduced by Seán MacEntee. She declined to stand as a Fianna Fáil candidate at the 1943 general election. She helped found the Irish Red Cross while Lord Mayor of Dublin.

She contested the 1948 general election for Clann na Poblachta in Dublin North-East but was not elected, receiving only 1,419 votes (3.2%).

== Later life ==
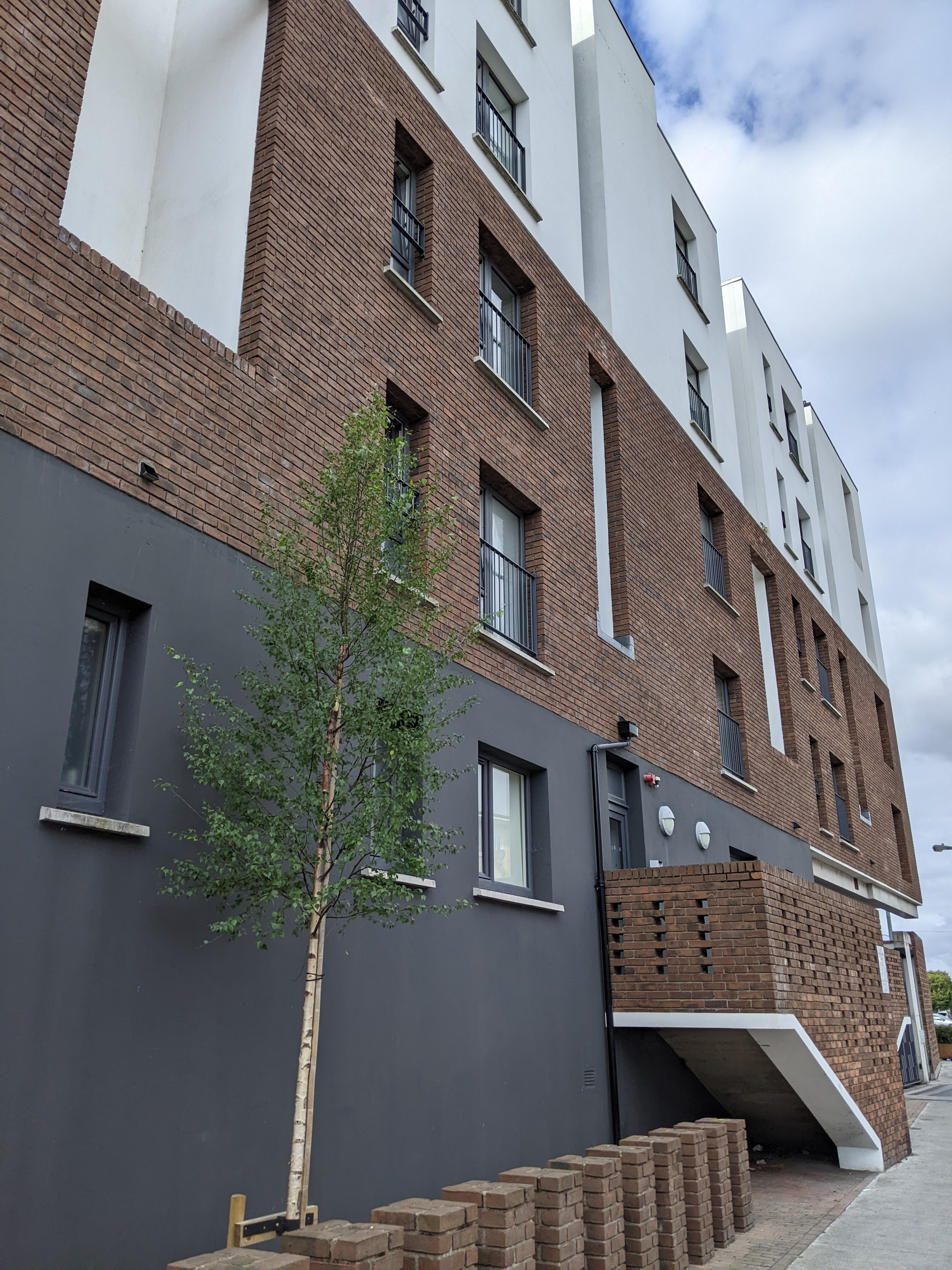
Kathleen Clarke Place, Poplar Row, Ballybough

In 1966, as part of the 50th anniversary celebrations of the Easter Rising, she and other surviving relatives were awarded honorary doctorates of law by the National University of Ireland. In the run-up to the commemorations of the Rising she wrote to the Taoiseach, Seán Lemass, saying that as "the only widow alive of the signatories of the 1916 Proclamation...I know more about the events both before and after the Rising than anyone now alive". She wanted a central role in the celebrations and said that her husband, not Patrick Pearse, had been president of the Republic in 1916.

She said Pearse "wanted to grab what was due to others ... surely Pearse should have been satisfied with the honour of Commander-in-Chief when he knew as much about commanding as my dog ... I had not intended raising the issue in public but I shall be forced to come out very strongly in public if the powers that be attempt to declare Pearse as President". In a taped interview made in 1968, she opined that Roger Casement was "... the aristocratic kind and he assumed that when he went into any movement, ipso facto, he was one of our leaders, if not the leader ... and what could he know of Ireland, when he was all the time out of it."

Following her death aged 94 in 1972 at a nursing home in Liverpool, she received the rare honour of a state funeral. She is buried at Deans Grange Cemetery, Dublin. She preferred to be known as Caitlín Bean Uí Chléirigh (Kathleen, Mrs Clarke) and had this inscription on her headstone. Her grand-niece, Helen Litton, edited her memoirs, and her biography was published in 1991.

'Kathleen Clarke Place', an apartment building in Ballybough, is named after Clarke.

Civic offices
| Preceded by Alfie Byrne | Lord Mayor of Dublin; 1939–1941 | Succeeded by Peadar Doyle |

| Dáil | Election | Deputy (Party) | Deputy (Party) | Deputy (Party) | Deputy (Party) |
|---|---|---|---|---|---|
| 2nd | 1921 | Seán McGarry (SF) | Seán T. O'Kelly (SF) | Philip Shanahan (SF) | Kathleen Clarke (SF) |
| 3rd | 1922 | Seán McGarry (PT-SF) | Seán T. O'Kelly (AT-SF) | Alfie Byrne (Ind.) | Laurence O'Neill (Ind.) |
| 4th | 1923 | Constituency abolished. See Dublin North | | | |

| Dáil | Election | Deputy (Party) | Deputy (Party) | Deputy (Party) | Deputy (Party) | Deputy (Party) | Deputy (Party) | Deputy (Party) | Deputy (Party) |
|---|---|---|---|---|---|---|---|---|---|
| 4th | 1923 | Alfie Byrne (Ind.) | Francis Cahill (CnaG) | Margaret Collins-O'Driscoll (CnaG) | Seán McGarry (CnaG) | William Hewat (BP) | Richard Mulcahy (CnaG) | Seán T. O'Kelly (Rep) | Ernie O'Malley (Rep) |
| 4th | 1925 by-election | Alfie Byrne (Ind.) | Patrick Leonard (CnaG) | Margaret Collins-O'Driscoll (CnaG) | Oscar Traynor (Rep) | William Hewat (BP) | Richard Mulcahy (CnaG) | Seán T. O'Kelly (Rep) | Ernie O'Malley (Rep) |
| 5th | 1927 (Jun) | Alfie Byrne (Ind.) | John Byrne (CnaG) | Margaret Collins-O'Driscoll (CnaG) | Oscar Traynor (SF) | Denis Cullen (Lab) | Richard Mulcahy (CnaG) | Seán T. O'Kelly (FF) | Kathleen Clarke (FF) |
| 6th | 1927 (Sep) | Alfie Byrne (Ind.) | John Byrne (CnaG) | Margaret Collins-O'Driscoll (CnaG) | Patrick Leonard (CnaG) | James Larkin (IWL) | Richard Mulcahy (CnaG) | Seán T. O'Kelly (FF) | Eamonn Cooney (FF) |
| 6th | 1928 by-election | Alfie Byrne (Ind.) | John Byrne (CnaG) | Margaret Collins-O'Driscoll (CnaG) | Patrick Leonard (CnaG) | Vincent Rice (CnaG) | Richard Mulcahy (CnaG) | Seán T. O'Kelly (FF) | Eamonn Cooney (FF) |
| 6th | 1929 by-election | Thomas F. O'Higgins (CnaG) | John Byrne (CnaG) | Margaret Collins-O'Driscoll (CnaG) | Patrick Leonard (CnaG) | Vincent Rice (CnaG) | Richard Mulcahy (CnaG) | Seán T. O'Kelly (FF) | Eamonn Cooney (FF) |
| 7th | 1932 | Alfie Byrne (Ind.) | John Byrne (CnaG) | Margaret Collins-O'Driscoll (CnaG) | Oscar Traynor (FF) | Cormac Breathnach (FF) | Richard Mulcahy (CnaG) | Seán T. O'Kelly (FF) | Eamonn Cooney (FF) |
| 8th | 1933 | Alfie Byrne (Ind.) | Patrick Belton (CnaG) | Vincent Rice (CnaG) | Oscar Traynor (FF) | Cormac Breathnach (FF) | Richard Mulcahy (CnaG) | Seán T. O'Kelly (FF) | Eamonn Cooney (FF) |
| 9th | 1937 | Constituency abolished. See Dublin North-East and Dublin North-West | | | | | | | |

| Dáil | Election | Deputy (Party) | Deputy (Party) | Deputy (Party) | Deputy (Party) |
|---|---|---|---|---|---|
| 22nd | 1981 | Ray Burke (FF) | John Boland (FG) | Nora Owen (FG) | 3 seats 1981–1992 |
| 23rd | 1982 (Feb) | Ray Burke (FF) | John Boland (FG) | Nora Owen (FG) | 3 seats 1981–1992 |
| 24th | 1982 (Nov) | Ray Burke (FF) | John Boland (FG) | Nora Owen (FG) | 3 seats 1981–1992 |
| 25th | 1987 | Ray Burke (FF) | John Boland (FG) | G. V. Wright (FF) | 3 seats 1981–1992 |
| 26th | 1989 | Ray Burke (FF) | Nora Owen (FG) | Seán Ryan (Lab) | 3 seats 1981–1992 |
| 27th | 1992 | Ray Burke (FF) | Nora Owen (FG) | Seán Ryan (Lab) | Trevor Sargent (GP) |
| 28th | 1997 | Ray Burke (FF) | Nora Owen (FG) | G. V. Wright (FF) | Trevor Sargent (GP) |
| 28th | 1998 by-election | Seán Ryan (Lab) | Nora Owen (FG) | G. V. Wright (FF) | Trevor Sargent (GP) |
| 29th | 2002 | Seán Ryan (Lab) | Jim Glennon (FF) | G. V. Wright (FF) | Trevor Sargent (GP) |
| 30th | 2007 | James Reilly (FG) | Michael Kennedy (FF) | Darragh O'Brien (FF) | Trevor Sargent (GP) |
| 31st | 2011 | James Reilly (FG) | Alan Farrell (FG) | Brendan Ryan (Lab) | Clare Daly (SP) |
| 32nd | 2016 | Constituency abolished. See Dublin Fingal | | | |
