= Michael Joyce (Irish politician) =

Irish politician

Mayor of Limerick
- In office January 1905 – January 1907

Member of Parliament for Limerick City
- In office October 1900 – December 1918

Personal details
- Born: 4 September 1851
- Died: 9 January 1941 (aged 89)

Michael Joyce (4 September 1851 – 9 January 1941) was an Irish politician who twice served as Mayor of Limerick and was the Member of Parliament for Limerick City from 1900 until 1918.

== Early life ==
Joyce was born at Merchant's Quay in Limerick in 1851. His father was a river pilot on the Shannon Estuary approach to the port of Limerick. He was educated by the Christian Brothers, attending three of their schools, including CBS Sexton Street. At the age of fourteen, Joyce left Limerick to serve as a seaman. During his time at sea, he survived four separate shipwrecks. Following his return to Limerick in the early 1870s, he became a pilot for Limerick Harbour Commissioners.

== Political career ==
A supporter of Home Rule for Ireland, Joyce, along with a local priest Robert Ambrose, established the local Limerick branch, the Sarsfield branch, of the Irish National League in 1882.

In 1899, Joyce was elected to Limerick Corporation and stood for election to Parliament at the 1900 general election as a candidate for the Irish Parliamentary Party, defeating the Unionist candidate Francis Kearney by 2521 votes to 474.

Joyce was also elected Mayor of Limerick in January 1905, serving two successive terms until January 1907.

Michael Joyce served as an MP until 1918. Although intending to run in the 1918 general election, he eventually decided not to seek re-election and was succeeded by the Sinn Féin candidate Michael Colivet, who was elected unopposed.

Joyce became president of the U.K. Pilots' Association in 1910 (later known as the U.K. Maritime Pilots' Association). He was also a founder member of the rugby club Garryowen in 1884, and played in the first fifteen for both that club and Limerick County. He was a member of St Michael's Temperance Society where he played Gaelic football. In 1900 he became the first Captain of St Michael's Rowing Club.

While travelling to London aboard the RMS Leinster in October 1918, Joyce survived his fifth maritime disaster, when the ship was torpedoed and sunk by a German U-Boat in the Irish Sea.

Parliament of the United Kingdom
Preceded by Francis Arthur O'Keefe	Member of Parliament for Limerick City; 1900 – 1918	Succeeded by Michael Colivet
