= Henry Gill (Jesuit) =

Henry Gill S.J., M.C., D.S.O.
- Born: 8 June 1872; Cabra, Dublin, Ireland
- Died: 27 November 1945 (aged 73)
- Education: Clongowes Wood College; University College Dublin; Milltown Institute of Theology and Philosophy; Catholic University of Louvain
- Occupations: Jesuit Priest, Scientist
- Known for: Military service, Scientific contributions
- Parent: Henry Joseph Gill (father)

Henry Gill S.J., M.C., D.S.O., was an Irish Jesuit priest and scientist, who for four years served as a chaplain in the Great War. Fr. Gill earned the Military Cross, Distinguished Service Order, serving with the 2nd Royal Irish Rifles.

Gill was born in Cabra, Dublin, on 8 June 1872. He was the son of Henry Joseph Gill former Irish Party MP and manager of the family M. H. Gill and Sons publishing company.

Gill was educated at the Jesuit Clongowes Wood College and in 1890 joined the Jesuits, first going to St Stanislaus College in Tullabeg, Co. Offally, then to Milltown Park, also studying Mathematics and Science at University College Dublin (Royal University of Ireland). He studied philosophy at the Catholic University of Louvain, returned to Milltown to complete his clerical training in Theology, and was ordained in Milltown in 1906. He continued his studies in England with the famous Professor J. J. Thomson, Cavendish Laboratories, Cambridge from 1906 to 1908. He conducted theoretical research into seismology which encouraged other Jesuits to pursue studies in the field.

He returned to Ireland and taught in Jesuit schools, such as Mungret College, Limerick, Belvedere College, Dublin, and Rathfarnam Castle.

In 1914 just after the start of the First World War, he joined the 2nd Irish Rifles as a chaplain, serving for four years. He wrote in the quarterly Irish Jesuits Studies Journal, campaigning trying to highlight interest with the Irish public, in the destruction of Belgium, particularly the Colleges in Louvain, which had a long connection with Ireland, by the German Army. As well as documenting the war in his diary and with his correspondence, he was a keen photographer; many of his photographs survive.

Returning to Ireland ,he taught at the Jesuit Belvedere College.

Gill died aged 73, on 27 November 1945.

== Publications ==
- H. Gill, Louvain and Ireland, Studies, September 1914, pp. 292–95 at p. 292.
- H. Gill, The fate of the Irish flag at Ypres, Studies, March 1919, pp. 119–128.
- H. Gill, Fact of Fiction in Modern Science, 1943.
- Henry V. Gill SJ MA MSc, Roger Boscovich (A short biography), M.H. Gill, 1941.
