= Tom Clarke (Irish republican) =

Irish republican (1858–1916)

Thomas James Clarke Tomás Séamus Ó Cléirigh
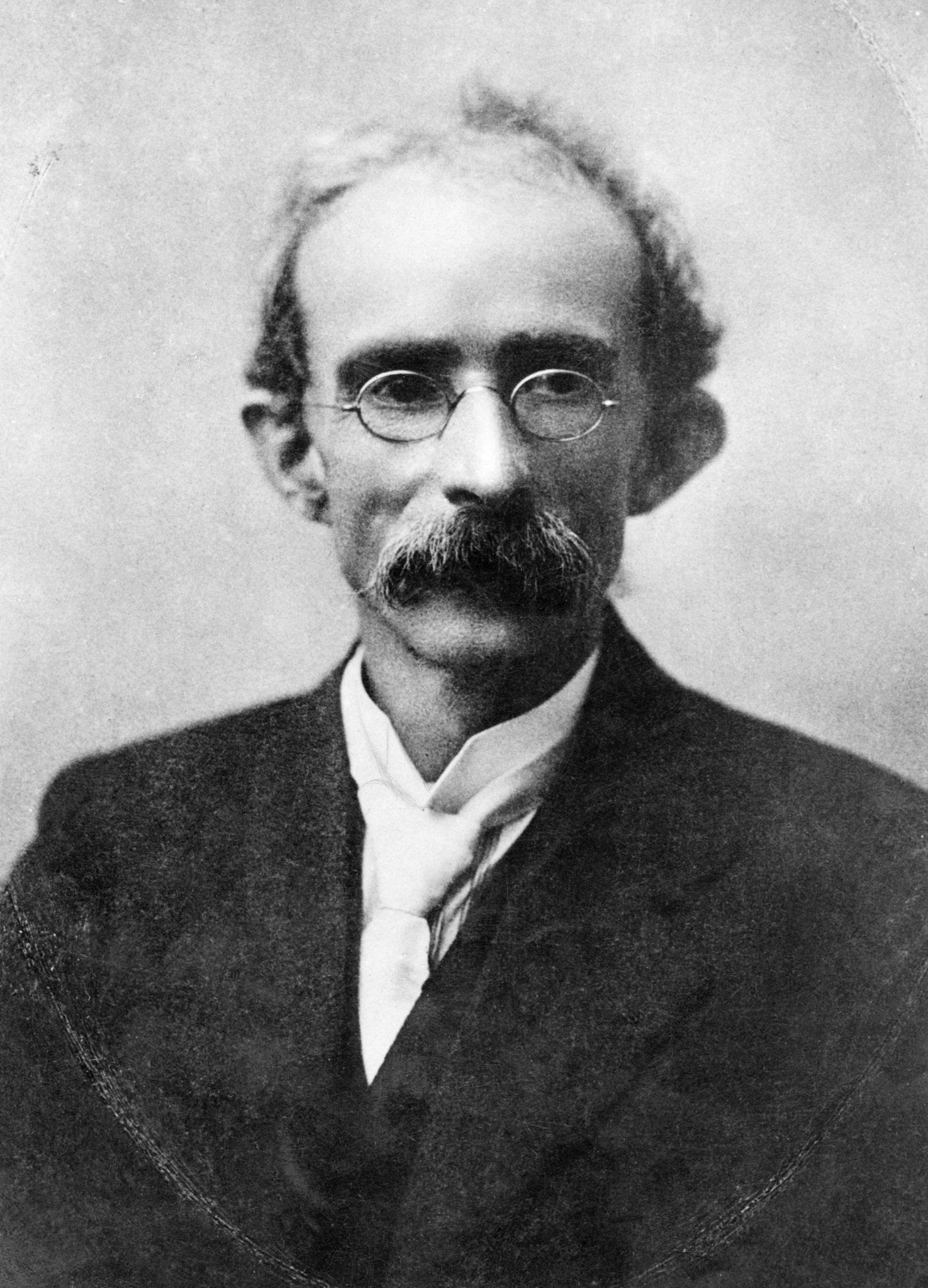
- Clarke in 1910
- Born: 11 March 1858; Hurst Castle, Milford-on-Sea, Hampshire, England
- Died: 3 May 1916 (aged 58); Kilmainham Gaol, Dublin, Ireland
- Cause of death: Execution by firing squad
- Other name: Henry Wilson
- Organization: Irish Republican Brotherhood
- Movement: Irish republicanism
- Spouse: Kathleen Clarke
- Children: 3

Thomas James Clarke (Irish: Tomás Séamus Ó Cléirigh; 11 March 1858 – 3 May 1916) was an Irish republican and a leader of the Irish Republican Brotherhood. Clarke was arguably the person most responsible for the 1916 Easter Rising. A proponent of armed struggle against British rule in Ireland for most of his life, Clarke spent 15 years in English prisons prior to his role in the Easter Rising and was executed by firing squad after it was defeated.

== Early life ==
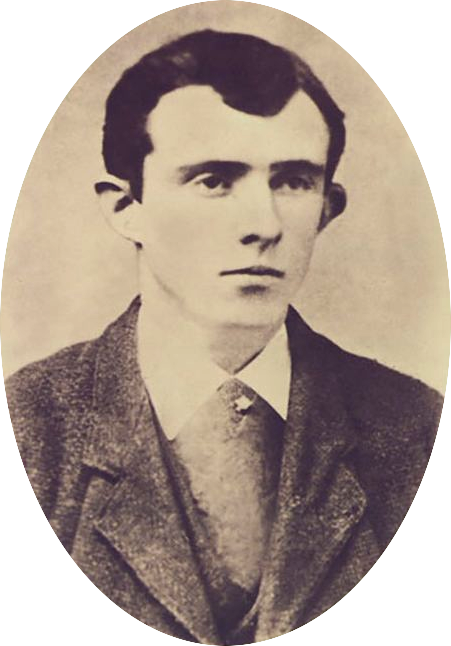
Clarke as a young man

Clarke was born at Hurst Castle near Milford-on-Sea in England, to Irish parents, Mary Palmer and James Clarke, who was a sergeant in the British Army. He had one brother, Joseph. In 1865, after spending some years in South Africa, Sgt. Clarke was transferred to Dungannon, County Tyrone, and it was there that he grew up.

== Irish Republican Brotherhood ==
In 1878, at the age of 20, he joined the Irish Republican Brotherhood (IRB) following the visit to Dungannon by John Daly, and by 1880 he was centre (head) of the local IRB circle. In August that year, after a member of the Royal Irish Constabulary (RIC) had shot and killed a man during riots between the Orange Order and the Ancient Order of Hibernians in Dungannon, Clarke and other IRB members attacked some RIC men in Irish Street. They were driven back, however, and Clarke, fearing arrest, fled to the United States.

=== Participation in Fenian dynamite campaign and 15 years imprisonment ===
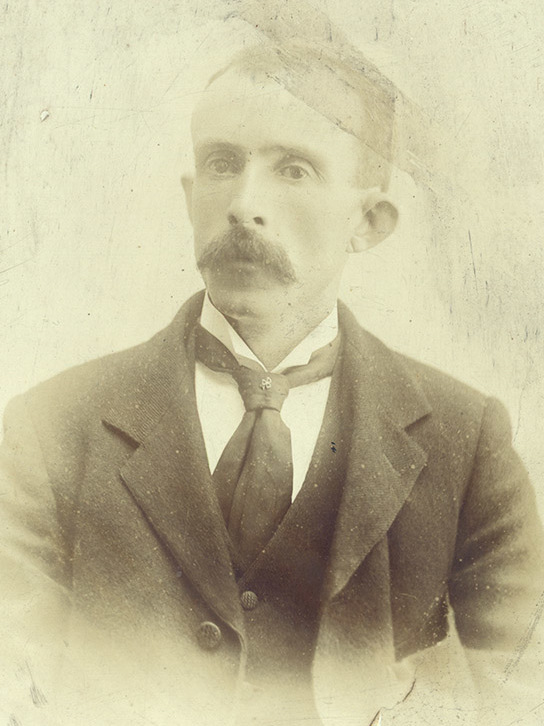
Clarke in 1899, a year after his release from prison

In 1883, Clarke was sent to London, under the alias of "Henry Wilson", to take part in the Fenian dynamite campaign advocated by Jeremiah O'Donovan Rossa, one of the IRB leaders exiled in the United States. British authorities were already following those involved, aided by informants, and Clarke was arrested in possession of dynamite, along with three others. He was tried and sentenced to penal servitude for life on 28 May 1883 at London's Old Bailey. He subsequently served 15 years in Pentonville and other British prisons. In 1896, he was one of only five remaining Fenian prisoners in British jails and a series of public meetings in Ireland called for their release. At one meeting, John Redmond MP, leader of the Parnellite Irish National League, said of him: "Wilson is a man of whom no words of praise could be too high. I have learned in my many visits to Portland for five years to love, honour and respect Henry Wilson. I have seen day after day how his brave spirit was keeping him alive ... I have seen year after year the fading away of his physical strength".

=== Relocating to America ===
Following his release in 1898, Clarke returned to Ireland where he was met by a number of welcome home parties in Dublin and Dungannon, and Limerick offered him the freedom of the city, which he accepted. Clarke stayed with the family of the Mayor of Limerick at the time, the republican John Daly, with whom Clarke had previously been imprisoned. It was during this time that Clarke was introduced to Kathleen Daly, John's niece. Tom Clarke and Kathleen would subsequently begin a relationship.

Despite his well-wishers, Clarke found it difficult to gain employment in Ireland following his return and would make the decision in 1900 to emigrate to Brooklyn in the United States. In 1901, he married Kathleen, 21 years his junior. The Irish nationalist John MacBride served as Clarke's best man. In New York, Clarke worked for the Irish nationalist organisation Clan na Gael under its leader, John Devoy. In September 1903 Clarke helped Clan na Gael launch their own newspaper, The Gaelic American, with Clarke serving as an assistant editor to Devoy. On 2 November 1905, Clarke became a naturalised American citizen.

After Clarke fell into ill health in late 1905, he gave up his job at the Gaelic American and moved with his wife to a 30-acre (120,000 m^{2}) farm in Manorville, New York, and bought another 30 acres there in 1907.

=== Return to Ireland, political activism ===
Reasoning that he needed to be in Ireland to continue his Fenianism, Clarke returned to Ireland in November 1907, where he opened up a tobacconist shop in Dublin while immersing himself back into the IRB which was undergoing a substantial rejuvenation under the guidance of younger men such as Bulmer Hobson and Denis McCullough. Clarke developed a very close kinship with Hobson, who along with Seán Mac Diarmada, became his protégé. The younger, more radical members of the IRB lauded Clarke for his militancy, and with their support, Clarke was quickly promoted to the Supreme Council of the IRB and made treasurer. It was alongside Hobson and Mac Diarmada that Clarke would establish the republican journal Irish Freedom in 1910.

In order for the IRB to extend its influence, it was also in 1910 that Clarke helped set up a front organisation called the Wolfe Tone Clubs Committee, which allowed members of the IRB to gather without overtly declaring their presence. In 1911 Clarke organised a gathering of Irish Republicans at the graveside of Wolfe Tone in Bodenstown Graveyard, County Kildare to counterprotest the royal visit of George V to Dublin. It was also during this time that Clarke displayed a large banner in his shop reading "Damn your concessions, England, we want our country!".

It was also during this late 1900s/early 1910s period that Clarke joined both the Gaelic League (despite speaking little to no Irish) and Sinn Féin. In usual IRB fashion, Clarke joined both with infiltration in mind, hoping he would be able to take internal control and sway the election of officers. The primary figure in Sinn Féin, Arthur Griffith, was impressed with Clarke and asked Clarke to stand as a Sinn Féin candidate in local elections for Dublin Corporation. Clarke, however, stated he had no interest in electoral politics, telling Griffith "none of that for me". Clarke felt that Sinn Féin, which at that time advocated for a form of home rule rather than outright Irish Independence, was "all right as far as it goes, but it doesn't go far enough".

Clarke supported the striking members of the Irish Transport and General Workers' Union during the 1913 Dublin Lockout and refused to sell copies of the Irish Independent, a newspaper owned by union-busting industrialist and press baron William Martin Murphy, at his tobacco shop. He was also involved in collections in support of the workers. However, he was critical of Irish trade unions' dependence on their English counterparts and regarded the Labour movement as a minor secondary struggle when compared to that for Irish Independence.

Clarke was a supporter of the Irish Women's Franchise League and supported the clause of the 1916 Proclamation guaranteeing equal opportunities for women.

In the summer of 1913 Clarke once again organised a gathering of republicans at Bodenstown. In that year Clarke invited a young man, Paidraig Pearse, to give the oration. By November of that year, Clarke had brought Pearse into the IRB, despite some reservations by other members of the IRB who feared that Pearse was politically unreliable and too personally ambitious.

== Irish Volunteers ==
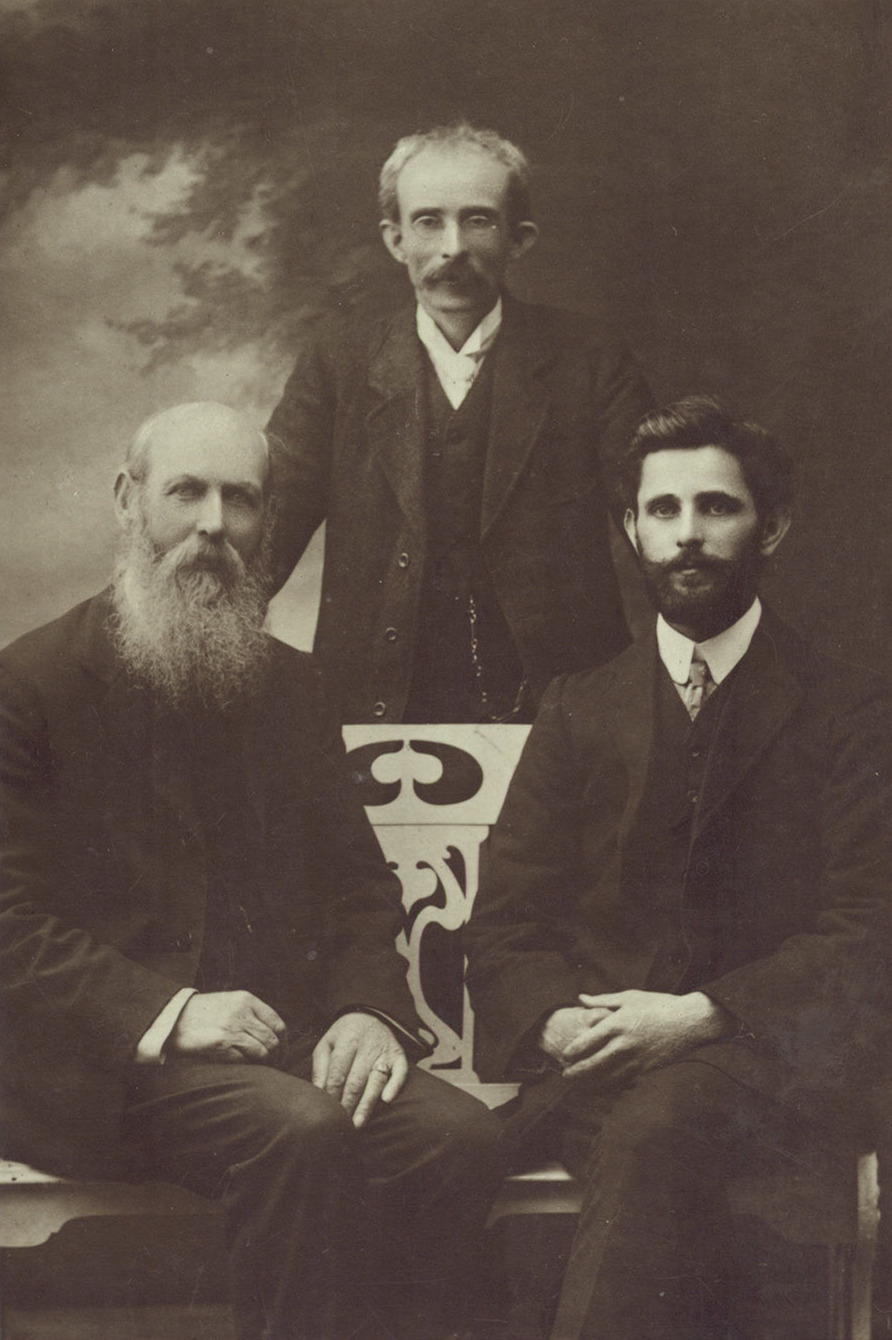
Clarke alongside fellow members of the Irish Republican Brotherhood John Daly and Seán Mac Diarmada

When the Irish Volunteers were formed in 1913, Clarke did not publicly take part, fearing that as a felon and well-known Irish nationalist, he would lend discredit to the Volunteers. Nevertheless, with Mac Diarmada, Hobson, Pearse and other IRB members such as Éamonn Ceannt taking important roles in the Volunteers, it was clear that the IRB would have substantial, if not total, control of the organisation. This proved largely to be the case until June 1913, when the leader of the Irish Parliamentary Party, John Redmond, demanded that the Provisional Committee accept 25 additional members of the Party's choosing, which would give the IPP loyalists a majority stake. Though most of the hard-liners, including Clarke, stood against this, Redmond's decree was accepted, partially due to the support given by Hobson. Clarke never forgave Hobson for this, calling it "a treasonous act" and dubbing Hobson a "Castle Spy".

On 24 September 1914, with World War I having just begun, it was Clarke and Mac Diarmada who instigated an internal coup of the Irish Volunteers which saw anti-Redmonites seize control of the Volunteers' HQ in Dublin and issue a manifesto which rejected Redmond's leadership. This precipitated a split in the Volunteers. Although the vast majority sided with Redmond, those who opposed Redmond kept the name "Irish Volunteers". From then on, the Irish Volunteers would be in near-total IRB control, much to Clarke's delight. Redmond's followers, now called the National Volunteers, would go on to serve as part of the British army in the war, while the Irish Volunteers would remain home in Ireland. It was out of this situation that Clarke saw an opportunity to organise a militant uprising in Ireland.

== Planning the uprising ==
Following Clarke's falling out with Hobson, Mac Diarmada and Clarke became almost inseparable. The two of them, as secretary and treasurer, respectively, de facto ran the IRB, although it was still under the nominal head of other men: James Deakin and later McCullough. In 1915 Clarke and Mac Diarmada established the Military Committee of the IRB to plan what later became the Easter Rising. The members were Pearse, Ceannt and Joseph Plunkett, with Clarke and Mac Diarmada adding themselves shortly thereafter.

When the old Fenian Jeremiah O'Donovan Rossa died in 1915, Clarke used his funeral (and Pearse's graveside oration) to mobilise the Volunteers and heighten expectation of imminent action.

In late 1915, Clarke used his connections with Clan na Gael back in New York City to arrange for German weapons to be shipped into Ireland to coincide with the planned uprising. It was during this period that Clarke became frantic, keen to plan out and organise every aspect of the rising. Clarke feared a repeat of the 1867 Fenian Rising which ended in disaster due to, amongst other reasons, poor planning and preparation. In January 1916, Clarke was accidentally shot in the right arm by IRB member Sean McGarry, who mishandled a weapon. Clarke was never able to regain use of the arm.

It was also in January 1916 when an agreement was reached between the IRB and the leading Marxist James Connolly and his Irish Citizen Army. Connolly was added to the IRB Military committee, with Thomas MacDonagh also added at the last minute in April. These seven men would later become the signatories of the Proclamation of the Republic, with Clarke as the first signatory. The IRB feared that Connolly and his much smaller ICA organisation (when compared to the Volunteers) would pre-empt an IRB uprising with one of their own and bring down the British authorities upon Ireland. Their response was to absorb Connolly and the ICA into their plans.

Although Clarke avoided publicity and attention by nature, his activities did not go unnoticed by Dublin Castle, the centre of British intelligence in Ireland. Dublin Metropolitan Police (DMP) detectives correctly realised that Clarke was the primary mover behind a planned republican revolution in Ireland and began to heavily monitor his activities. DMP detectives rented a shop directly across from his Parnell Street shop in order to directly observe his comings and goings and were planning to arrest him just days before the Easter Rising launched in late April 1916.

In one of the final meetings before the Easter Rising went ahead, a gathering of the military council discussed the Proclamation of the Irish Republic; it was decided amongst them that Clarke's signature should be the first amongst them on the document, owing to the sentiment that "he had done more than anyone else to bring about the rising".

== Easter Rising ==
There was immediate confusion at the onset of the Easter Rising when Eoin MacNeill, nominally the head of the Irish Volunteers, issued orders in the Sunday Independent for Volunteers not to gather. Clarke was livid and denounced MacNeill as a traitor, but resolved to push ahead regardless.

Clarke was located at headquarters in the General Post Office (GPO) during the events of Easter Week, where rebel forces were largely composed of Irish Citizen Army members under the command of Connolly. Though he held no formal military rank, Clarke was recognised by the garrison as one of the commanders and was active throughout the week. After Connolly was badly wounded on 27 April, Clarke took an active role in command. It has been said that Clarke indeed would have been the declared President and Commander-in-chief, but he refused any military rank and such honours; these were given to Pearse, who was more well-known and respected on a national level following the O'Donovan Rossa speech. Kathleen Clarke later claimed that her husband, and not Pearse, was first president of the Irish Republic. At the time of planning, the Clarkes were living in a house on Richmond Avenue, Fairview.

Late in the week, the GPO had to be evacuated due to a fire. The leaders gathered in a house in Moore Street to decide how to proceed. Clarke was the only leader amongst them who wished to keep fighting. With a nearly unanimous vote having been taken, Pearse ordered the rebels to surrender on 29 April. Clarke broke down into tears. Clarke wrote on the wall of the house, "We had to evacuate the GPO. The boys put up a grand fight, and that fight will save the soul of Ireland."

== Execution ==
Clarke was arrested by the British after the surrender. He and the other commanders were taken to the Rotunda where he was stripped of his clothing in front of the other prisoners. Following the search, Clarke was greatly distressed when the DMP was able to produce a file accurately documenting the majority of his life, including his early life, his time in prison, his time in America and his activities for the IRB since returning to Ireland. He was later held in Kilmainham Gaol and he was court-martialled on 2 May 1916. Clarke made no statements in his defence.

Clarke was executed by firing squad, along with Pearse and MacDonagh, on 3 May 1916. Before his execution, Clarke was able to speak with his wife Kathleen. He asked her to warn Republicans about Eoin MacNeill (the leader of the Irish Volunteers who countermanded the order for the Rising), saying:

I want you to see to it that our people know of his treachery to us. He must never be allowed back into the national life of this country, for so sure as he is, so sure will he act treacherously in a crisis. He is a weak man, but I know every effort will be made to whitewash him.

He also told her he was glad to be facing execution, as he dreaded the thought of returning to prison. Summarising his thoughts about the future, he told Kathleen that "between this and freedom Ireland will go through hell, but she will never lie down again until she has attained full freedom", before asking her to convey a message to the Irish people:

My comrades and I believe we have struck the first successful blow for freedom, and so sure as we are going out this morning so sure will freedom come as a direct result of our action...In this belief, we die happy.

== Legacy ==
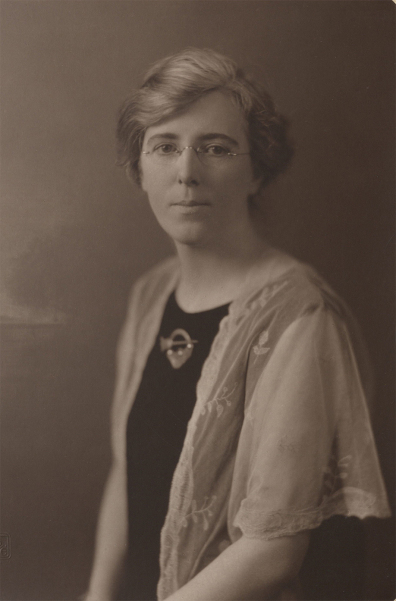
Tom's wife Kathleen continued to be a republican activist in politics for many decades after his death

The historian James Quinn has opined that Clarke was "probably the most single-minded of all the 1916 leaders". Quinn states that despite his frail physical appearance and aversion to public speaking, Clarke can be described as the fiercest, most tenacious and most zealous of all the Easter Rising leaders.

After her husband's execution, Kathleen Clarke was elected a TD in the Second Dáil, notably speaking against the Anglo-Irish Treaty.

- The Thomas Clarke Tower block of flats in Ballymun Flats was named after him. The top floor was used as a short-stay hotel before its demolition in April 2008.
- Dundalk railway station was given the name Clarke on 10 April 1966 in commemoration of Clarke's role in the 1916 Rising.
- The Tom Clarke Bridge is a tolled bridge across the River Liffey in Dublin. The bridge, officially named after Clarke, is popularly referred to as the East-Link Bridge.
- He also featured on postage stamps in 1966.
- Dungannon Thomas Clarkes, a successful GAA Club and Gaelic football team in Clarke's hometown in County Tyrone are also named after him.
- Dungannon has a 1916 Society named in his honour, Cumann Thomáis ui Chléirigh.
- Clarke Square in Collins Barracks
- He was portrayed by Lalor Roddy in the 2016 miniseries Rebellion, a dramatic retelling of the events and aftermath of the 1916 Rising.
- The Brooklyn chapter of Conradh na Gaeilge is named for Kathleen and Tom Clarke (Cumann Chaitlín agus Thomáis Úi Chléirigh).

== Gallery ==
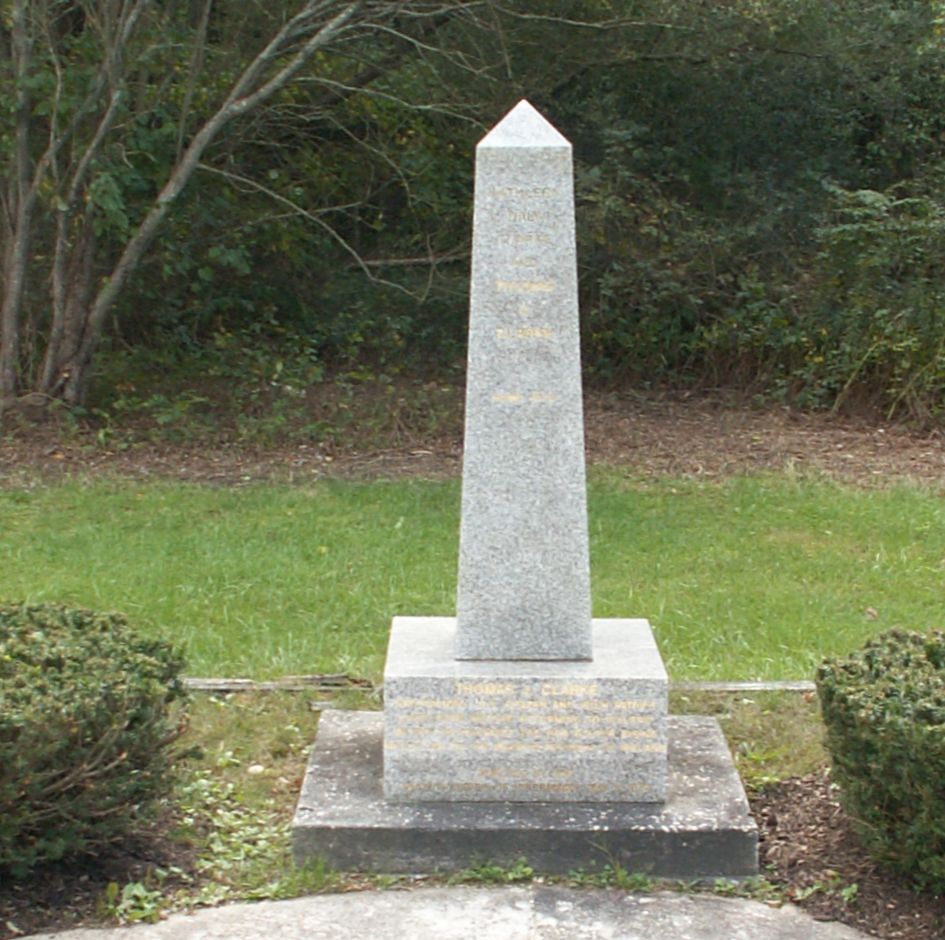
Wicklow granite memorial dedicated in 1987 in Manorville, New York at the site of his 60-acre farm

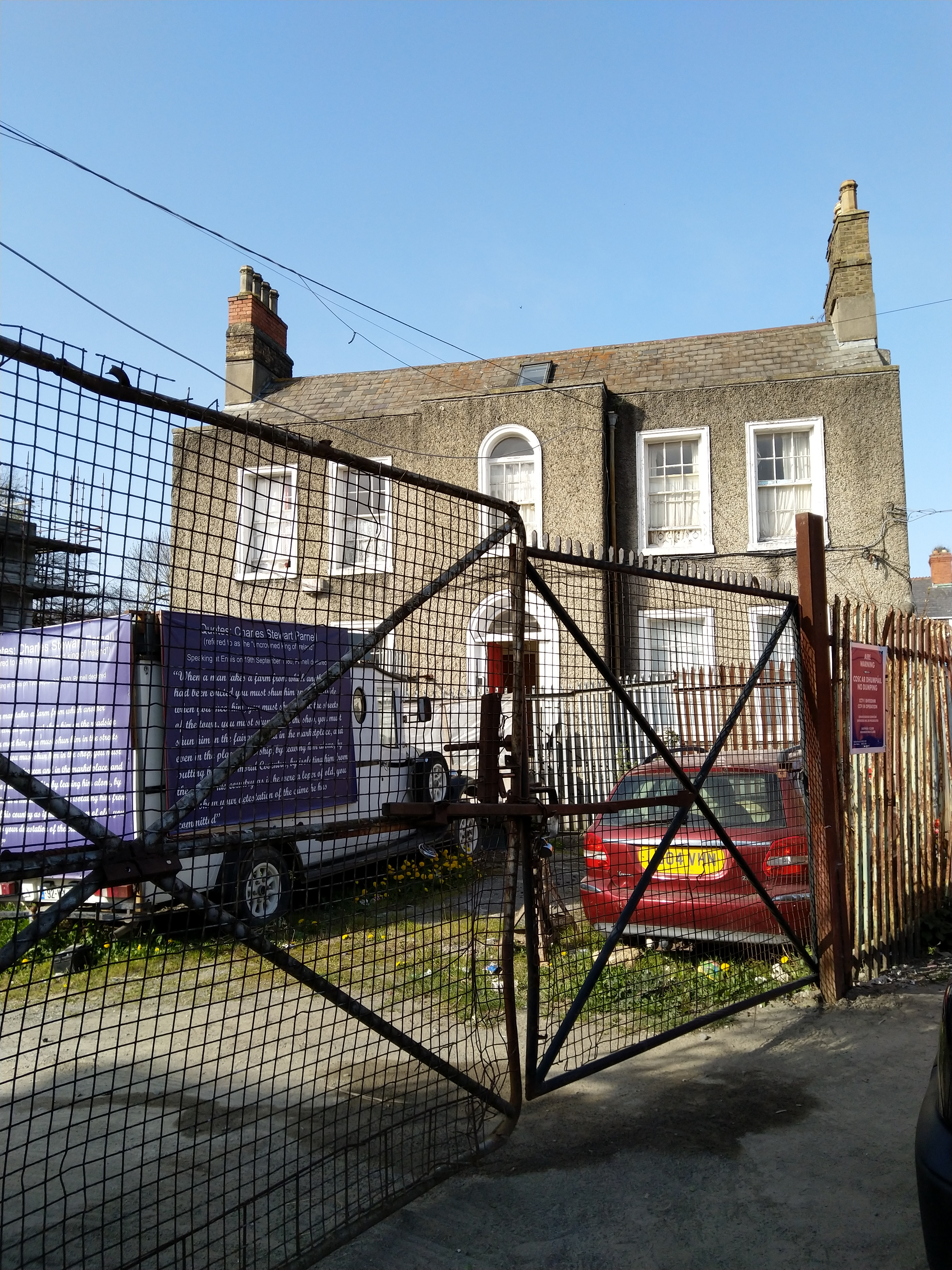
Clarke's House, Fairview, Dublin

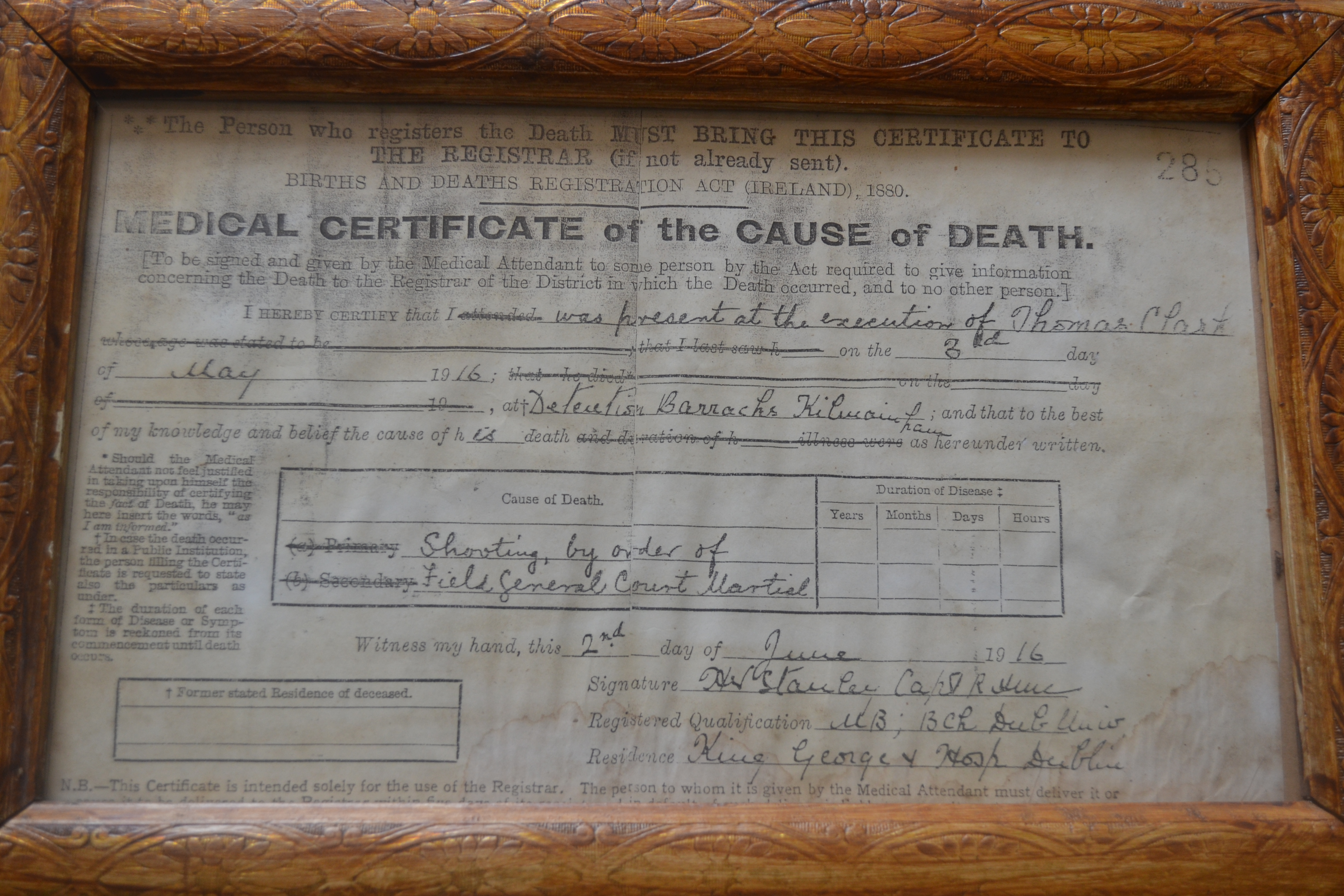
Death Certificate of Thomas Clarke

Tom Clarke 1916 commemorative plaque at the junction of Parnell Street and O'Connell Street, Dublin

== Works ==
- Glimpses of an Irish Felon's Prison Life (1922: The National Publications Committee, Cork) https://www.exclassics.com/glimpses/glimpsesintro.htm
