= Home Government Association =

- Founded: 1870; 155 years ago
- Dissolved: 1873; 152 years ago
- Succeeded by: Home Rule League
- Ideology: Irish nationalism Home Rule
- Colours: Green

The Home Government Association was a pressure group launched by Isaac Butt in support of home rule for Ireland at a meeting in Bilton's Hotel, Dublin, on 19 May 1870.

The meeting was attended or supported by sixty-one people of different political and religious persuasions, including six Fenians, Butt seemingly having consulted with the Irish Republican Brotherhood before launching his initiative.

Its inaugural public meeting was held on 1 September 1870. Active in campaigning in several elections for the association was P. F. Johnson.

It became the Home Rule League in 1873.
