= Henry Joseph Gill =

Irish publisher, translator, and politician

Henry Joseph Gill (1836 – 1903) was an Irish publisher, translator, and politician.

He was educated at Castleknock College, Dublin and was a graduate of Trinity College Dublin, Henry Joseph Gill was the managing editor of M. H. Gill and Sons, publishers.

He translated works including The Cid Campeador by Antonio de Trueba.

He was Irish Parliamentary Party MP for County Westmeath from 1880 to 1883 and for Limerick City from 1885 to 1888.

His son Henry Gill S.J., M.C., D.S.O., Jesuit priest, scientist, and served as a chaplain in the great war, where he earned Military Cross, Distinguished Service Order, serving with the 2nd Royal Irish Rifles.

Parliament of the United Kingdom
| Preceded by Patrick James Smyth; Lord Robert Montagu | Member of Parliament for County Westmeath; 1880 – 1883; With: Timothy Daniel Sullivan | Succeeded by Timothy Daniel Sullivan; Timothy Charles Harrington |
| Preceded by Edward McMahon; Daniel Fitzgerald Gabbett | Member of Parliament for Limerick City; 1885 – 1888 | Succeeded by Francis Arthur O'Keefe |
