= Francis Arthur O'Keefe =

Irish politician

Francis Arthur O'Keefe (October 1856 – 21 April 1909) was an Irish politician.

Educated at Clongowes Wood College and Trinity College Dublin, he became a solicitor. For three successive years he was Mayor of Limerick. Elected in a by-election in 1888, he sat as Member of Parliament for Limerick City until the general election of 1895, and after another by-election in 1895, until 1900.

Parliament of the United Kingdom
Preceded by Henry Joseph Gill	Member of Parliament for Limerick City; 1888 – 1895	Succeeded by John Daly
Preceded by John Daly	Member of Parliament for Limerick City; 1895 – 1900	Succeeded by Michael Joyce
