= Daniel Fitzgerald Gabbett =

Daniel Fitzgerald Gabbett, MP (7 November 1841 – 4 August 1898) was an Irish Home Rule League Member of Parliament (M.P.) for Limerick City from 1879 to 1885.

== Personal life ==
Gabbett was born on 7 November 1841. He was the son of Daniel Gabbett and Susannah Fitzgerald. Gabbett descended on his mother's side from Miler Magrath, a sixteenth-century Archbishop of Cashel in the Church of Ireland.

He was educated at St Columba's College, Dublin and at Trinity College, Dublin. He served in the 2nd Life Guards beginning in 1862, and in the 10th Royal Hussars, retiring 6 November 1867. He was a lieutenant.

Gabbett was reported to be a patron of the theatre: “Actors in distress especially enlisted his sympathy, the theatrical profession possessing an attraction for his somewhat Bohemian tastes.”

In 1894, he married Augusta Janey Thornton. He died in London on 4 August 1898.

== Political career ==
Gabbett was a Justice of the Peace (J.P.) in County Limerick, and served in the House of Commons as a Home Rule League M.P. for the Borough of Limerick from 1879 to 1885.

== Contemporary description ==
Shortly after his death in 1898, Gabbett was eulogised by the Irish Nationalist journalist Justin McCarthy, MP:

“I read, the other day, an account of the death of a former Parliamentary colleague, whose name will probably be quite unknown to the American public in general, but of whom I venture to offer a few words of reminiscence. I am speaking of Major Daniel Fitzgerald Gabbett, who was in the House of Commons and an Irish Nationalist member several years ago. My old friend Gabbett was just such an Irishman as Thackeray would have loved to draw. He could tell a rattling good story; he could sing a good song in an exquisite baritone voice; he was fond of giving musical parties at his rooms off Pall Mall; he was full of animal spirits and was never without a joke on his lips.

He was of the landlord class but unlike most of his class, he became a Nationalist and a follower of Charles Stewart Parnell. He was in the House of Commons during the times of the terrible obstruction, when seven or eight of us used to keep the House sitting for days and nights together by our incessant making of speeches and insisting on divisions; and his good spirits helped to keep us alive during many a weary night. We take a vote in the House of Commons, as most of your readers know, by passing into the Ay or the No Lobby, according as we are inclined to vote for the motion or against it, and each lobby is a long, spacious room or corridor, the length of the Chamber itself, and inclosing the Chamber on either side. At one time, before our numbers grew stronger, and before we had any English supporters, we, the followers of Parnell, used to pass, the whole seven or eight of us, into one lobby, and the entire House of Commons used to stream down the other lobby. Then it was that our friend Gabbett's animal spirits shone out. He was always the first in our lobby, and he put on the appearance of a man bewildered and affrighted by the pressure of a vast crowd behind him. 'Keep back, boys,' he used to cry, imploringly, to the six or seven of us; 'don't stifle us! Don't keep crushing on us in that sort of way! We'll all get through, I assure you, in time, if you'll only have patience; but it will do no good to the cause if we crush each other to death.’

I could not help feeling a genuine pang of personal regret when I learned that poor Gabbett's jovial, humorous career had come to an end, that he would never sing a song or make a joke on earth any more."

== Footnotes ==
Parliament of the United Kingdom
Preceded by Isaac Butt; Richard O'Shaughnessy	Member of Parliament for Limerick; 1871–1879; With: Richard O'Shaughnessy to 1883; Edward McMahon from 1883	Succeeded by Henry Joseph Gill
