= James O'Brien (1806–1882) =

Irish barrister, politician and judge

Judge of the Court of Queen's Bench (Ireland)
- In office 1858–1882

Member of Parliament for Limerick City
- In office 1854–1858

Personal details
- Born: 1806 Granard, County Longford
- Died: 1882 (aged 75–76) St Stephen's Green, Dublin
- Party: Whig
- Education: Trinity College Dublin (BA)
- Profession: Barrister, politician, judge

James O'Brien (1806–1882) was a nineteenth-century Irish barrister, politician and judge.

He was born in Granard, County Longford, the fourth son of James O'Brien and Margaret Long, daughter of Peter Long of Waterford. His father died in February 1806, around the time James was born, and his mother remarried Cornelius O'Brien, MP for County Clare, the County Clare politician and landowner. He went to school in Dublin, and entered Trinity College Dublin, where he graduated BA in 1829 with a gold medal in science. He entered Gray's Inn in 1831 and was called to the Irish Bar in 1831, becoming Queen's Counsel in 1841.

He entered politics as a Whig and was elected to the House of Commons as member for Limerick City in 1854; he was re-elected in 1857. He became Third Serjeant in 1848 and Second Serjeant in 1851. In 1858 he was appointed a judge of the Court of Queen's Bench (Ireland) and held that office until his death. He died at his townhouse at St Stephen's Green; he also had a house in Dalkey.

He married Margaret Segrave in 1836 and they had six children: John, Anne, Emily, Clara, Mary and Margaret. Probably his most eminent relative was his nephew Peter O'Brien, 1st Baron O'Brien, Lord Chief Justice of Ireland 1889–1913, who was the son of his elder brother John O'Brien MP and Ellen Murphy.

== Arms ==
Coat of arms of James O'Brien

Crest
Issuing out of clouds a naked arm embowed the hand grasping a sword.
Escutcheon
Gules three lions passant guardant per pale Or and Argent.
Motto
Lamh Laidir An Nachtar

== Sources ==
- Ball, F. Elrington; The Judges in Ireland 1221-1921 London John Murray 1926 Vol. II
