= Isaac Butt =

Irish nationalist politician and barrister

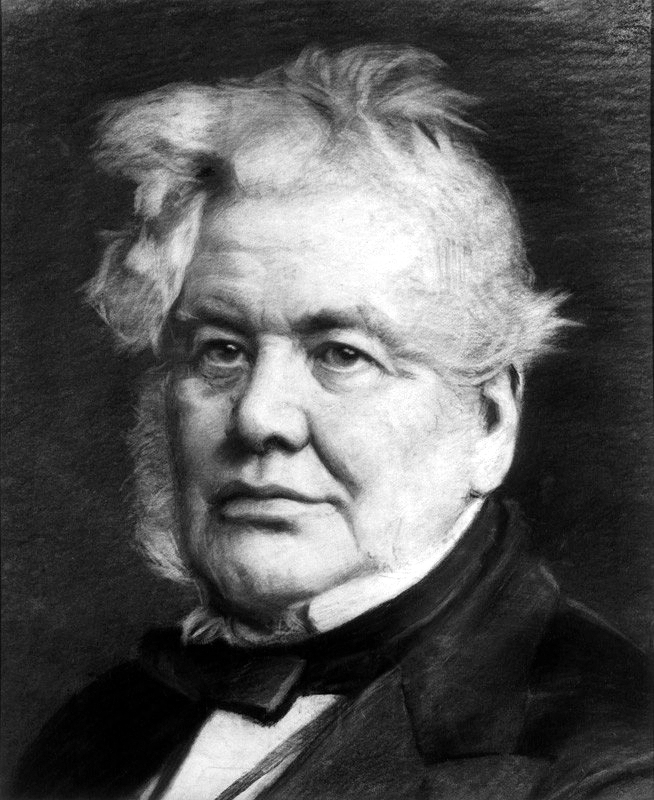
- Portrait of Isaac Butt, by John Butler Yeats

Leader of the Home Rule League
- In office 21 November 1873 – 5 May 1879
- Preceded by: New position
- Succeeded by: William Shaw

Member of Parliament for Limerick City
- In office 4 March 1871 – 5 May 1879
- Preceded by: Francis William Russell; George Gavin
- Succeeded by: Daniel Fitzgerald Gabbett; Richard O'Shaughnessy

Member of Parliament for Youghal
- In office 11 June 1852 – 12 April 1865
- Preceded by: Thomas Chisholm Anstey
- Succeeded by: Joseph Neale McKenna

Personal details
- Born: 6 September 1813 Glenfin, County Donegal, Ireland
- Died: 5 May 1879 (aged 65) Clonskeagh, Dublin, Ireland
- Party: Home Rule League (from 1873)
- Other political affiliations: Home Government Association (1870–1873); Irish Conservative Party (until 1870)
- Education: Trinity College Dublin

Isaac Butt (6 September 1813 – 5 May 1879) was an Irish barrister and nationalist leader who, if not the originator of the term Home Rule, was the first to make it an effective political slogan. He was the founder (1870) and first chief of the Home Government Association and president (1873–77) of the Home Rule Confederation of Great Britain, but he was superseded in 1878 as head of the Home Rule movement by the younger and more forceful Charles Stewart Parnell. He served as a Member of Parliament in the United Kingdom House of Commons from 1852 to 1865 and 1871 to 1879, representing various Irish constituencies.

Of Butt, Colin W. Reid argues that Home Rule was the mechanism Butt proposed to bind Ireland to Great Britain. It would end the ambiguities of the Act of Union of 1800. He portrayed a federalised United Kingdom, which would have weakened Irish exceptionalism within a broader British context. Butt was representative of a constructive national unionism.

As an economist, he made significant contributions regarding the potential resource mobilisation and distribution aspects of protection, and analysed deficiencies in the Irish economy such as sparse employment, low productivity, and misallocation of land. He dissented from the established Ricardian theories and favoured some welfare state concepts. As an editor, he created the Dublin University Magazine, a leading Irish journal of politics and literature.

== Early life ==
Butt was born 6 September 1813 in the parish of Glenfin, County Donegal, Ulster, bordering the Finn Valley. Glenfin is a short distance west of Ballybofey, a town in East Donegal. He was born into an Ulster Protestant family, being the son of a Church of Ireland rector, and was descended from the O'Donnells of Tyrconnell, through the Ramsays. Butt received his secondary school education at The Royal School in Raphoe in the Laggan district of East Donegal, and at Midleton College in County Cork, before attending Trinity College Dublin at the age of fifteen, where he was elected a scholar, and president of the (extern) College Historical Society. Whilst there he co-founded the Dublin University Magazine and edited it for four years. For much of his life he was a member of the Irish Conservative Party, and he founded the conservative Ulster Times newspaper. He became Whately Professor of Political Economy at Trinity College in 1836 and held that position until 1841.

== Legal career ==
After being called to the bar in 1838, Butt quickly established a name for himself as a brilliant barrister. He was known for his opposition to the Irish nationalist leader Daniel O'Connell's campaign for the repeal of the Act of Union. He also lectured at Trinity College Dublin, in political economy. His experiences during the Great Famine led him to move from being an Irish unionist and an Orangeman to supporting a federal political system for the United Kingdom of Great Britain and Ireland that would give Ireland a greater degree of self-rule. This led to his involvement in Irish nationalist politics and the foundation of the Home Rule League. Butt was instrumental in fostering links between constitutional and revolutionary nationalism through his representation of members of the Fenians Society in court.

== Political career ==
He began his career as a Tory politician on Dublin Corporation. He was Member of Parliament (MP) for Youghal from 1852 to 1865, and for Limerick from 1871 to 1879 (at the 1852 general election he had also been elected for the English constituency of Harwich, but chose to sit for Youghal).

The failed Fenian Rising in 1867 strengthened Butt's belief that a federal system was the only way to break the dreary cycle of inefficient administration punctuated by incompetent uprisings. Having defended the leaders of the Fenian revolt, Butt then from June 1869 became president of the Amnesty Association formed to secure the release of imprisoned Fenians, supported actively amongst others by P. F. Johnson.

In 1870, Butt then founded the Irish Home Government Association. This was in no sense a revolutionary organisation. It was designed to mobilise public opinion behind the demand for an Irish parliament, with, as he put it, "full control over our domestic affairs". He believed that Home Rule would promote friendship between Ireland and her neighbour to the east.

In November 1873, Butt replaced the Association with a new body, the Home Rule League, which he regarded as a pressure-group, rather than a political party. In the general election the following year, 60 of its members were elected, subsequently forming the Irish Parliamentary Party in 1884. However, most of those elected were men of property who were closer to the Liberal cause. In the meantime, Charles Stewart Parnell had joined the League, with more radical ideas than most of the incumbent Home Rulers, and was elected to Parliament in a by-election in County Meath in 1875.

Butt had failed to win substantial concessions at Westminster on the things that mattered to most Irish people: an amnesty for the Fenians of 1867, fixity of tenure for tenant-farmers and Home Rule. Although they worked to get Home Rulers elected, many Fenians along with tenant farmers were dissatisfied with Butt's gentlemanly approach to have bills enacted, although they did not openly attack him, as his defence of the Fenian prisoners in 1867 still stood in his favour. However, soon a Belfast Home Ruler, Joseph Gillis Biggar (then a senior member of the IRB), began making extensive use of the ungentlemanly tactic of "obstructionism" to prevent bills being passed by the house.

== Declined influence ==
When Parnell entered Parliament he took his cue from John O'Connor Power and Joseph Biggar and allied himself with those Irish members who would support him in his obstructionist campaign. MPs at that time could stand up and talk for as long as they wished on any subject. This caused havoc in Parliament. In one case they talked for 45 hours non-stop, stopping any important bills from being passed. Butt, ageing, and in failing health, could not keep up with this tactic and considered it counter-productive. In July 1877, Butt threatened to resign from the party if obstruction continued, and a gulf developed between himself and Parnell, who was growing steadily in the estimation of both the Fenians and the Home Rulers.

The climax came in December 1878, when Parliament was recalled to discuss the war in Afghanistan. Butt considered this discussion too important to the British Empire to be interrupted by obstructionism and publicly warned the Irish members to refrain from this tactic. He was fiercely denounced by the young Nationalist John Dillon, who continued his attacks with considerable support from other Home Rulers at a meeting of the Home Rule League in February 1879. Although he defended himself with dignity, Butt, and all and sundry, knew that his role in the party was at an end.

Butt, who had been suffering from bronchitis, had a stroke the following May and died within a week. He was replaced by William Shaw, who in turn was replaced by Charles Stewart Parnell in 1880.

== Personal life ==
Butt amassed debts and pursued romances. It was said that at meetings he was occasionally heckled by women with whom he had fathered children. He was also involved in a financial scandal when it was revealed that he had taken money from several Indian princes to represent their interests in parliament.

Butt was also active in Irish freemasonry, being a member of Lodge No. 2 in Dublin.

Despite his chaotic lifestyle and political limitations, Butt was capable of inspiring deep personal loyalty. Some of his friends, such as John Butler Yeats (father of the poet W. B. Yeats) and the future Catholic Bishop of Limerick, Edward Thomas O'Dwyer, retained a lasting hostility towards Parnell for his role in Butt's downfall.

Butt lived for a period at the former home of architect Francis Johnston at number 60 (now number 64) Eccles Street, Dublin. He also had a home for a period on North Great George's Street at umber 41 Kenmare House.

== Death ==
He died on 5 May 1879 at the residence of his son-in-law in Roebuck near Clonskeagh in Dublin. His remains were brought by train, via Strabane, to Stranorlar in the east of County Donegal, where he is buried in a corner of the Church of Ireland cemetery beneath a tree by which he used to sit and dream as a boy.

== Memorialization ==
In May 2010, the Church of Ireland (Anglican) parishes of Stranorlar, Meenglass and Kilteevogue instigated an annual memorial Service and Lecture in Butt's honour, inviting members of the professions of law, politics and journalism to reflect aspects of his life. Speakers have included Dr. Joe Mulholland, Senator David Norris, Dr. Chris McGimpsey and Prof. Brian Walker. His grave has been restored and the memorial now includes a wreath.

== In literature ==
- Butt briefly appears in Harry Harrison's alternate history novels Stars and Stripes trilogy.

== Arms ==
Coat of arms of Isaac Butt

Notes
Granted 14 August 1856 by Sir John Bernard Burke, Ulster King of Arms.
Crest
A horse's head erased Argent charged on the neck with a trefoil Vert the headand mane plaited Or on the head a lume of three ostrich feathers of the first.
Escutcheon
Quarterly 1st & 4th Gules on a chevron engrailed between three estoiles Or a trefoil Vert between two lozenges of the first (Butt) 2nd Azyre three bars counterchanged Or on a canton Gules a lion's head erased Argent (Cox) 3rd Argent an eagle displayed and in chief between two pellets a cross crosslet fitchee Sable (Ramsay) the cross crosslet being adopted in commemoration of a descent through the Ramsays from the family of O'Donnell.
Motto
Possunt Quia Posse Videntur

Parliament of the United Kingdom
Preceded by Thomas Chisholm Anstey	Member of Parliament for Youghal; 1852 – 1865	Succeeded by Joseph Neale McKenna
Preceded by Francis William Russell and George Gavin	Member of Parliament for Limerick; 1871–1879; With: George Gavin, to 1874; Richard O'Shaughnessy, from 1874	Succeeded by Daniel Fitzgerald Gabbett and Richard O'Shaughnessy
