= Francis William Russell =

British politician (died 1871)

Francis William Russell (3 June 1800 – 30 August 1871) was the Liberal MP for Limerick City from 1852 until his death.

He was the son of John Norris Russell a Limerick merchant and miller, and brother of Richard Russell, who died one day before him in Limerick. He was educated at Trinity College, Dublin and entered the Irish Bar in 1824.

In 1834 he married Frances Clarke from Melton Mowbray; his son, John Thomas Norreys Russell, was a barrister on the South Eastern Circuit and later a JP for Leicestershire; and his grandson, Francis Deane Russell, had a distinguished career in the Indian Army.

Following the death of Francis in 1871, his position in the parliament was filled by Issac Butt.

Parliament of the United Kingdom
| Preceded by Earl of Arundel and Surrey | Member of Parliament for Limerick (2nd seat) | Succeeded by Isaac Butt |
