= Deedes =

Deedes is a surname. Notable people with the surname include:

- Bill Deedes, KBE, MC, PC, DL (1913–2007), British Conservative Party politician, army officer and journalist
- Charles Deedes KCB CMG DSO (1879–1969), senior British Army officer who went on to be Military Secretary
- John Deedes (1803–1885), amateur English cricketer
- Julius Deedes, English MP
- Ralph Bouverie Deedes, K.C.B., O.B.E., M.C. (1890–1954), senior officer in the pre-partition Indian Army
- William Deedes junior (1834–1887), English cricketer and a Conservative Party politician
- William Deedes senior (born 1796), English cricketer who played first-class cricket from 1817 to 1826, and a Conservative Party politician
- Wyndham Deedes CMG DSO (1883–1956), British Brigadier General, Chief secretary to the British High Commissioner of the British Mandate of Palestine

== See also ==
- Deeds (surname)
