= 1872 Wexford by-election =

UK Parliamentary by-election

The 1872 Wexford by-election was fought on 26 April 1872. The by-election was fought due to the resignation of the incumbent MP of the Liberal Party, Richard Joseph Devereux. It was won by the Home Rule candidate William Archer Redmond.
