= Wykeham Leigh Pemberton =

Major-General Sir Wykeham Leigh Pemberton KCB JP (4 December 1833 – 2 March 1918) was a British Army officer and magistrate. He served as Aide-de-camp to Charles Monck, 4th Viscount Monck, in Canada; and, to Prince George, Duke of Cambridge. He was the brother of Sir Edward Leigh Pemberton, grandfather of Robin Leigh-Pemberton, Baron Kingsdown, Governor of the Bank of England.

== Biography ==
Pemberton was born at Torry Hill, near Kingsdown in Kent. He was the fifth son of Edward Leigh-Pemberton (1795–1877), M.P., of Torry Hill, by his wife Charlotte, daughter of Samuel Compton Cox, Master of the Court of Chancery. He was educated at Rugby School and served in the Royal Navy (1845-6), before receiving a commission in the 60th King's Royal Rifle Corps in 1852. He was severely wounded at the Siege of Cawnpore, losing two fingers on his left hand. From 1862 to 1868, he was Aide-de-camp to Charles Monck, 4th Viscount Monck, while Governor-General of Canada. From 1875 to 1880, he was Commanding Officer of the 3rd Battalion 60th Rifles, and led them during the Anglo-Zulu War of 1879 at Gingindlovu and the relief of Eshowe. From 1880 to 1885, he was Assistant Quartermaster General. From 1885 to 1890, he was Aide-de-camp to Prince George, Duke of Cambridge, after which he was promoted to Major-General. He was appointed Colonel of the 4th Battalion King's Royal Rifle Corps from 1906 until his death in 1918. In 1884, he married Jessie, daughter of John Graham of Skelmorlie Castle, and they were the parents of one son and two daughters. In 1891, he purchased an estate where he lived with his family - Abbots Leigh, near Haywards Heath, and he served as a J.P. for Sussex.
