= 1869 Wexford by-election =

UK Parliamentary by-election

The 1869 Wexford by-election was held on 26 February 1869. The by-election was held because the election of the incumbent Liberal MP, Richard Joseph Devereux had been declared void. It was retained by Devereux who was unopposed.
