= John Deedes =

English cricketer

Personal information
- Born: 14 June 1803; Sandling, Kent, England
- Died: 11 January 1885 (aged 81); Belgravia, Westminster, England
- Relatives: William Deedes, Sr. (brother); William Deedes, Jr. (nephew)

Domestic team information
- Years: Team
- 1822: Cambridge University
- 1822–1828: Kent
- 1828: Hampshire

John Deedes (14 June 1803 – 11 January 1885) was an amateur English cricketer.

== Career ==
Deedes was educated at Winchester and Trinity College, Cambridge. He made his debut for Cambridge University in 1822, playing a single match for the club against the Cambridge Town Club. During the same season, Deedes made his debut for Kent against the Marylebone Cricket Club.

Deedes' next appearance came in 1827 for the Gentlemen in the Gentlemen v Players player fixture, in which Deedes appeared in both the Gentlemen v Players fixtures for 1827, as well as representing Kent in a single match against the Marylebone Cricket Club.

In 1828 Deedes made his only appearance for Hampshire against an early England team. Deedes also made two further appearances for Kent in 1828, with his final appearance for the county coming against Sussex.

In 1829 Deedes played in the unusually named fixture Married v Single, where Deedes represented the Single team, suggesting at this time Deedes was not married or had no partner of sorts. Deedes played a final fixture for the Gentlemen in the 1829 Gentlemen v Players and made a single appearance for England against Surrey.

Deedes died at Belgravia, Westminster on 11 January 1885.

== Family ==
Deedes brother William Deedes Sr. played for Hampshire, Kent and the Marylebone Cricket Club. As well as playing cricket, William was a Conservative Party politician who was a Member of Parliament for East Kent from 1845 to 1857 and 1857–1862 following the resignation from the House of Commons of Sir Edward Dering who had defeated Deedes at the 1857 election.

Deedes nephew William Deedes Jr. also played and was later also an MP for East Kent.

== Bibliography ==
- Carlaw, Derek (2020). Kent County Cricketers, A to Z: Part One (1806–1914) (PDF). Cardiff: ACS.
