= Wyndham Knatchbull =

Sir Wyndham Knatchbull, 12th Baronet JP (9 August 1844 – 30 July 1917) was a British barrister and Conservative Party politician.

Knatchbull was the second son of Sir Norton Knatchbull, 10th Baronet and his wife Mary Watts-Russell, eldest daughter of Jesse Watts-Russell, MP for Gatton. He was educated at Eton College and worked then as civil servant for the General Post Office. In 1871, he succeeded his older brother Edward as baronet. He entered the British House of Commons in 1875, sitting for East Kent until the following year. Knatchbull was justice of the peace for Kent.

== Family ==
Knatchbull married, at Christ Church, Folkestone, on 18 March 1902, Margaret Elizabeth Taylor, daughter of Charles Taylor, Esq., of Frensham Hill, Surrey, and widow of John Dillon Browne, Esq. Their marriage was childless. He died in 1917 aged 73 and was succeeded by Cecil Knatchbull-Hugessen, the second son of his cousin Edward Knatchbull-Hugessen, 1st Baron Brabourne, in turn the second son of Sir Edward Knatchbull, 9th Baronet and Fanny Austen Knight (niece of Jane Austen).

Parliament of the United Kingdom
Preceded by George Watson Milles; Edward Leigh Pemberton	Member of Parliament for East Kent; 1875 – 1876; With: Edward Leigh Pemberton	Succeeded by William Deedes; Edward Leigh Pemberton
Baronetage of England
Preceded by Edward Knatchbull	Baronet (of Mersham Hatch); 1871–1917	Succeeded by Cecil Knatchbull-Hugessen
