= 1876 East Kent by-election =

UK Parliamentary by-election

The 1876 East Kent by-election was held on 26 July 1876. The byelection was held due to the resignation of the incumbent Conservative MP, Wyndham Knatchbull. It was won by the Conservative candidate William Deedes junior.

The by-election was an unopposed by-election. William Deedes senior, his father had previously represented the same constituency, from 1845 to 1857 and from 1857 to 1862, but William junior's political career was shorter, as he stood down from Parliament at the 1880 general election.
