= Ronald McNeill, 1st Baron Cushendun =

British politician and writer (1861–1934)

The Right Honourable The Lord Cushendun PC
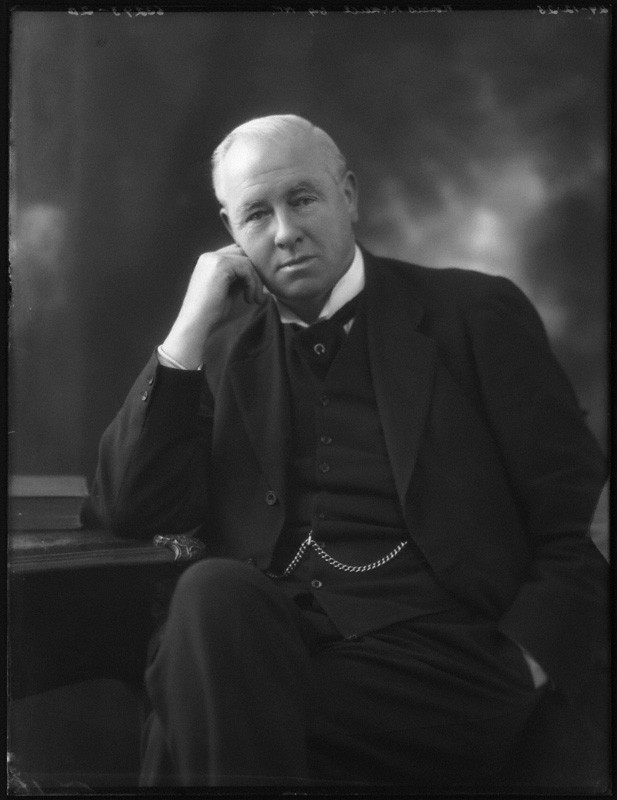
- McNeill in 1923

Chancellor of the Duchy of Lancaster
- In office 19 October 1927 – 4 June 1929
- Prime Minister: Stanley Baldwin
- Preceded by: The Viscount Cecil of Chelwood
- Succeeded by: Sir Oswald Mosley
Junior Ministerial offices
Financial Secretary to the Treasury
In office 5 November 1925 – 19 October 1927
Prime Minister	Stanley Baldwin
Preceded by	Walter Guinness
Succeeded by	Arthur Samuel
Parliamentary Under-Secretary of State for Foreign Affairs
In office 11 November 1924 – 5 November 1925
Prime Minister	Stanley Baldwin
Preceded by	Arthur Ponsonby
Succeeded by	Godfrey Locker-Lampson
In office 31 October 1922 – 23 January 1924
Prime Minister	Bonar Law; Stanley Baldwin
Preceded by	Cecil Harmsworth
Succeeded by	Arthur Ponsonby

Member of the House of Lords Lord Temporal
- In office 8 November 1927 – 12 October 1934; Hereditary peerage
- Preceded by: Peerage created
- Succeeded by: Peerage extinct

Member of Parliament for Canterbury St Augustine's (1911–18)
- In office 7 July 1911 – 4 November 1927
- Preceded by: Aretas Akers-Douglas
- Succeeded by: William Wayland

Personal details
- Born: Ronald John McNeill; 30 April 1861 Torquay, Devon, UK
- Died: 12 October 1934 (aged 73) Cushendun, County Antrim, Northern Ireland, UK
- Party: Conservative
- Spouse: Elizabeth Bolitho
- Children: 3
- Parents: Edmund McNeill (father); Mary Miller (mother)
- Education: Harrow School
- Alma mater: Christ Church, Oxford

Ronald John McNeill, 1st Baron Cushendun, PC (30 April 1861 – 12 October 1934), was a British Conservative politician and writer.

== Background and education ==
McNeill was born into an Ulster-Scots family in Torquay. He was the son of Edmund McNeill, DL, JP, Sheriff of County Antrim, and his wife Mary (née Miller). He was educated at Harrow and Christ Church, Oxford, graduating in 1886. McNeill was called to the bar in 1888 and started work as editor of The St James's Gazette (1900–04), as well as assistant editor of the Encyclopædia Britannica (1906–10).

== Political career ==
Having unsuccessfully contested the seats of West Aberdeenshire (1906), Aberdeen South (1907 and Jan. 1910) and Kirkcudbrightshire (Dec. 1910), McNeill was elected as Unionist Member of Parliament for the St Augustine's division of Kent in 1911. Seven years later he became representative for Canterbury and in 1922 was appointed Under-Secretary of State for Foreign Affairs, a post he held, with a short interval for the first Labour Government of 1924, until 1925.

After serving as Financial Secretary to the Treasury for two years, McNeill was made Chancellor of the Duchy of Lancaster with a seat in the cabinet in 1927. The same year he was also sworn of the Privy Council and, in November 1927, raised to the peerage as Baron Cushendun, of Cushendun in the County of Antrim. Acting Foreign Secretary in 1928 and twice chief British representative to the League of Nations, Lord Cushendun signed the Kellogg-Briand Pact in August that year. He retired from office in 1929.

== Cushendun and Glenmona House ==
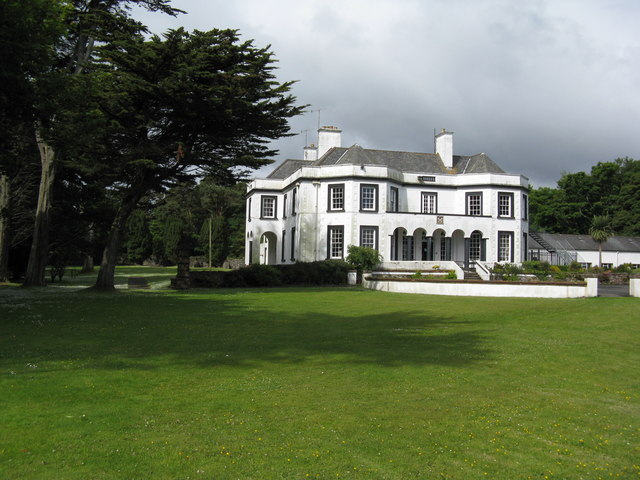
Glenmona House today

From 1910, McNeill resided, when not in London, at Glenmona House (also known as Glenmona Lodge) in Cushendun, the coastal village in the Glens of Antrim in the north-east of County Antrim, from which he later took his title. He was burnt out of the house in 1922, having a replacement built that was designed by Clough Williams-Ellis. The village also contains buildings designed by Williams-Ellis, built in memory of Lord Cushendun's Cornish wife, Maud, who died in 1925.

== Family ==
In 1884, he married Elizabeth Maud Bolitho (sister of William Bolitho), a Cornishwoman and Christian Scientist. They had three daughters: Esther Rose, Loveday Violet, and Mary Morvenna Bolitho (who married Major Philip Le Grand Gribble, military correspondent and memoirist). After Elizabeth's death in 1925 he married Catherine Sydney Louisa Margesson in 1930. She survived him, dying in 1939. Lord Cushendun died in Cushendun in October 1934, aged 73, when the barony became extinct.

Parliament of the United Kingdom
Preceded by Aretas Akers-Douglas	Member of Parliament for St Augustine's; 1911 – 1918	Succeeded by Himself as MP for Canterbury (County)
Preceded by Aretas Akers-Douglas	Member of Parliament for St Augustine's; 1911 – 1918	Succeeded by Vere Ponsonby as MP for Dover (County)
Preceded by Himself as MP for St Augustine's	Member of Parliament for Canterbury; 1918–1927	Succeeded by William Wayland
Preceded by George Knox Anderson as MP for Canterbury (Borough)	Member of Parliament for Canterbury; 1918–1927	Succeeded by William Wayland
Political offices
Preceded by Cecil Harmsworth	Under-Secretary of State for Foreign Affairs; 1922–1924	Succeeded by Arthur Ponsonby
Preceded by Arthur Ponsonby	Under-Secretary of State for Foreign Affairs; 1924–1925	Succeeded by Godfrey Locker-Lampson
Preceded by Hon. Walter Guinness	Financial Secretary to the Treasury; 1925–1927	Succeeded by Arthur Samuel
Preceded by The Viscount Cecil of Chelwood	Chancellor of the Duchy of Lancaster; 1927–1929	Succeeded by Sir Oswald Mosley, Bt
Peerage of the United Kingdom
New creation	Baron Cushendun; 1927–1934	Extinct
