= St Augustine's (constituency) =

Former parliamentary constituency in the United Kingdom

- Former constituency for the House of Commons

1885–1918
- Seats: one
- Created from: East Kent
- Replaced by: Canterbury, Dover, Hythe

St Augustine's was a parliamentary constituency in Kent. It returned one Member of Parliament to the House of Commons of the Parliament of the United Kingdom.

The constituency was created for the 1885 general election, and abolished for the 1918 general election.

== Boundaries ==
The Sessional Divisions of Elham, Home and Wingham, the Municipal Boroughs of Canterbury, Deal, Dover, Folkestone and Hythe and the corporate town of Fordwich, Bekesbourne, Ringwold, Kingsdown and Walmer.

== History ==
In its 33-year existence this constituency only ever elected two Members of Parliament, both Conservatives; its first MP was the former Home Secretary, Aretas Akers-Douglas.

== Members of Parliament ==
Election	Member	Party
1885	Aretas Akers-Douglas	Conservative
1911	Ronald McNeill	Conservative
1918	constituency abolished	

== Election results ==
Decades:	1880s; 1890s; 1900s; 1910s

=== Elections in the 1880s ===
General election 1885: St Augustine's
Party	Candidate	Votes	%	±%
Conservative	Aretas Akers-Douglas	5,842	62.0	
Liberal	Alfred Simmons	3,582	38.0	
Majority		2,260	24.0	
Turnout		9,424	77.5	
Registered electors		12,157		
Conservative win (new seat)				

General election 1886: St Augustine's
Party	Candidate	Votes	%	±%
Conservative	Aretas Akers-Douglas	Unopposed		
Conservative hold				

=== Elections in the 1890s ===
General election 1892: St Augustine's
Party	Candidate	Votes	%	±%
Conservative	Aretas Akers-Douglas	Unopposed		
Conservative hold				

General election 1895: St Augustine's
Party	Candidate	Votes	%	±%
Conservative	Aretas Akers-Douglas	Unopposed		
Conservative hold				

=== Elections in the 1900s ===
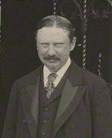
Akers-Douglas

General election 1900: St Augustine's
Party	Candidate	Votes	%	±%
Conservative	Aretas Akers-Douglas	Unopposed		
Conservative hold				

General election 1906: St Augustine's
Party	Candidate	Votes	%	±%
Conservative	Aretas Akers-Douglas	7,655	61.5	N/A
Liberal	Charles Prescott	4,794	38.5	New
Majority		2,861	23.0	N/A
Turnout		12,449	78.6	N/A
Registered electors		15,841		
Conservative hold				

=== Elections in the 1910s ===
General election January 1910: St Augustine's
Party	Candidate	Votes	%	±%
Conservative	Aretas Akers-Douglas	9,500	69.8	+8.3
Liberal	Robert Turnbull Lang	4,114	30.2	−8.3
Majority		5,386	39.6	+16.6
Turnout		13,614	81.9	+3.3
Registered electors		16,614		
Conservative hold		Swing	+8.3	

General election December 1910: St Augustine's
Party	Candidate	Votes	%	±%
Conservative	Aretas Akers-Douglas	Unopposed		
Conservative hold				

1911 St Augustine's by-election
Party	Candidate	Votes	%	±%
Conservative	Ronald McNeill	Unopposed		
Conservative hold				

General Election 1914–15:

Another General Election was required to take place before the end of 1915. The political parties had been making preparations for an election to take place and by July 1914, the following candidates had been selected;

- Unionist: Ronald McNeill
- Liberal: Hubert Townsend
