= 1875 East Kent by-election =

UK Parliamentary by-election

The 1875 East Kent by-election was fought on 27 January 1875. The by-election was fought due to the succession to a peerage of the incumbent Conservative MP, George Milles. It was won by the unopposed Conservative candidate Wyndham Knatchbull.
