= East Clare =

UK parliamentary constituency in Ireland, 1885–1922

- Former county constituency for the House of Commons

1885–1922
- Seats: 1
- Created from: County Clare; Ennis
- Replaced by: Clare

East Clare was a UK Parliament constituency in Ireland, returning one Member of Parliament (MP) from 1885 to 1922.

Before the 1885 United Kingdom general election the area was part of the County Clare constituency. From 1922, shortly before the establishment of the Irish Free State, it was not represented in the UK Parliament.

== Boundaries ==
This constituency comprised the eastern part of County Clare. In 1918, it was extended to include an area formerly part of County Galway which had been transferred to County Clare in 1899.

1885–1918: The baronies of Burren, Bunratty Lower, Bunratty Upper, Tulla Lower, Tulla Upper, that part of the barony of Inchiquin consisting of the parishes of Dysert, Kilkeedy, Killinaboy, Kilnamona, Rath (excluding the townlands of Carrowvere, Drinagh, Loughnagowan, Martry, Moanreel North and Moanreel South) and Ruan, and that part of the barony of Islands consisting of the parishes of Clare Abbey, Clondagad (excluding the townlands of Dehomad, Furroor and Liscasey), Drumcliff and Killone.

1918–1922: The existing East Clare constituency, together with that part of the South Galway constituency comprised in the administrative county of Clare.

== Members of Parliament ==
Years	Member	Party
1885–1892	Joseph Richard Cox	Irish Parliamentary Party
1892–1900	Willie Redmond	Parnellite Nationalist
1900–1917	Willie Redmond	Irish Parliamentary Party
1917–1922	Éamon de Valera	Sinn Féin

== Elections ==
=== Elections in the 1880s ===
General election 28 November 1885: Clare East
Party	Candidate	Votes	%	±%
Irish Parliamentary	Joseph Richard Cox	6,224	95.6	
Irish Conservative	Lucius O'Brien	289	4.4	
Majority		5,935	91.2	
Turnout		6,513	64.3	
Registered electors		10,128		
Irish Parliamentary win (new seat)				

General election 5 July 1886: Clare East
Party	Candidate	Votes	%	±%
Irish Parliamentary	Joseph Richard Cox	Unopposed		
Registered electors		10,128		
Irish Parliamentary hold				

=== Elections in the 1890s ===
General election 12 July 1892: Clare East
Party	Candidate	Votes	%	±%
Irish National League	Willie Redmond	3,203	53.7	N/A
Irish National Federation	Joseph Richard Cox	2,759	46.3	N/A
Majority		444	7.4	N/A
Turnout		5,962	53.2	N/A
Registered electors		11,198		
Irish National League gain from Irish Parliamentary		Swing	N/A	

General election 19 July 1895: Clare East
Party	Candidate	Votes	%	±%
Irish National League	Willie Redmond	3,315	50.4	−3.3
Irish National Federation	P. A. McHugh	3,258	49.6	+3.3
Majority		57	0.8	−6.6
Turnout		6,573	61.0	+7.8
Registered electors		10,780		
Irish National League hold		Swing	−3.3	

=== Elections in the 1900s ===
General election 2 October 1900: Clare East
Party	Candidate	Votes	%	±%
Irish Parliamentary	Willie Redmond	Unopposed		
Registered electors		12,028		
Irish Parliamentary hold				

General election 15 January 1906: Clare East
Party	Candidate	Votes	%	±%
Irish Parliamentary	Willie Redmond	Unopposed		
Registered electors		8,585		
Irish Parliamentary hold				

=== Elections in the 1910s ===
General election 18 January 1910: Clare East
Party	Candidate	Votes	%	±%
Irish Parliamentary	Willie Redmond	Unopposed		
Registered electors		8,709		
Irish Parliamentary hold				

General election 6 December 1910: Clare East
Party	Candidate	Votes	%	±%
Irish Parliamentary	Willie Redmond	Unopposed		
Registered electors		8,709		
Irish Parliamentary hold				

- Death of Redmond

By-election 10 July 1917: Clare East
Party	Candidate	Votes	%	±%
Sinn Féin	Éamon de Valera	5,010	71.1	New
Irish Parliamentary	Patrick Lynch, K.C.	2,035	28.9	N/A
Majority		2,975	42.2	N/A
Turnout		7,045	77.2	N/A
Registered electors		9,130		
Sinn Féin gain from Irish Parliamentary		Swing	N/A	

General Election 14 December 1918: Clare East
Party	Candidate	Votes	%	±%
Sinn Féin	Éamon de Valera	Unopposed		
Registered electors		23,511		
Sinn Féin gain from Irish Parliamentary				
