= John Edward Redmond (1806–1865) =

Irish banker (1806–1865)

John Edward Redmond (1806–1865) was an Irish banker and magistrate, Liberal MP for the city of Wexford from 1859 to 1865. He was the first Redmond in a famous Irish political dynasty.

== Family ==
John Edward Redmond was the second son of John Redmond (1770–1822) of Somerton, County Wexford, by his wife and cousin Eliza, daughter of John Sutton of Summer Hill, County Wexford and Dama Castle, County Kilkenny. His father and uncle - Walter Redmond of Newtown Lodge and Ballytrent House - were well known in banking and shipping circles in Wexford, founding Redmond's Bank. His uncle had successfully campaigned for removing the market tithes charged at Wexford, where they were particularly oppressive, and he built a small pier for the vessels in the harbour. Walter abolished the bridge tolls and reclaimed much of the low waste land. He also negotiated the extension of the railway to open up the West and South as well as to establish the new route then being opened at Rosslare Strand.

The Redmond family were one of the oldest of the Anglo-Norman families in Ireland, having been established in County Wexford since 1170, building 'The Hall', or 'Redmond Hall' in 1350. The last to live there, his ancestor, the elderly Sir Alexander Redmond, resisted a siege from the Protestant Captain Alston until Oliver Cromwell himself arrived from whence Redmond 'capitulated upon honourable terms'. Under the Act of Settlement 1662, the old castle was transferred to Sir Nicholas Loftus, and has since been known as Loftus Hall. The family held on to one third of their original estates, the lands around Killygowan, and maintained a prominent position within the county. For the next two centuries, members of this family vacillated between Catholicism and protestantism. Two of his father's uncles fought with the French, General Michael Redmond, Aide-de-camp to Francis I, Holy Roman Emperor, and Gabriel Redmond (1713–1789), Chevalier de St. Louis, Captain in the Irish Brigade (French), but his grandfather supported the British in the 1798 Wexford Rebellion and many other of his relatives adhered to the Protestant faith in order to obtain official positions or just to maintain their land and lifestyles. John Redmond's grandfather was one of a distinguished group of cousins who counted amongst them three European countesses, of the House of Limburg-Stirum, Probentow von Wilmsdorff and Sutton-de Clonard.

== Politics ==
The Redmonds had always held political sway within County Wexford to one extent or another, but it was only in the latter half of the nineteenth century that a Catholic became eligible to sit in Parliament. As the first of his family to be elected to the Parliament of the United Kingdom, he established the Redmonds as Liberals.

He stood for Parliament in 1859 unopposed, the two rival candidates (Mr Devereux and Sir Frederick Hughes) having retired in his favour. He was introduced by the mayor in a typical, old-fashioned speech, which took place on such occasions, which showed him as a representative citizen of a representative family. He was a typical example of a member of the nineteenth-century Catholic gentry.

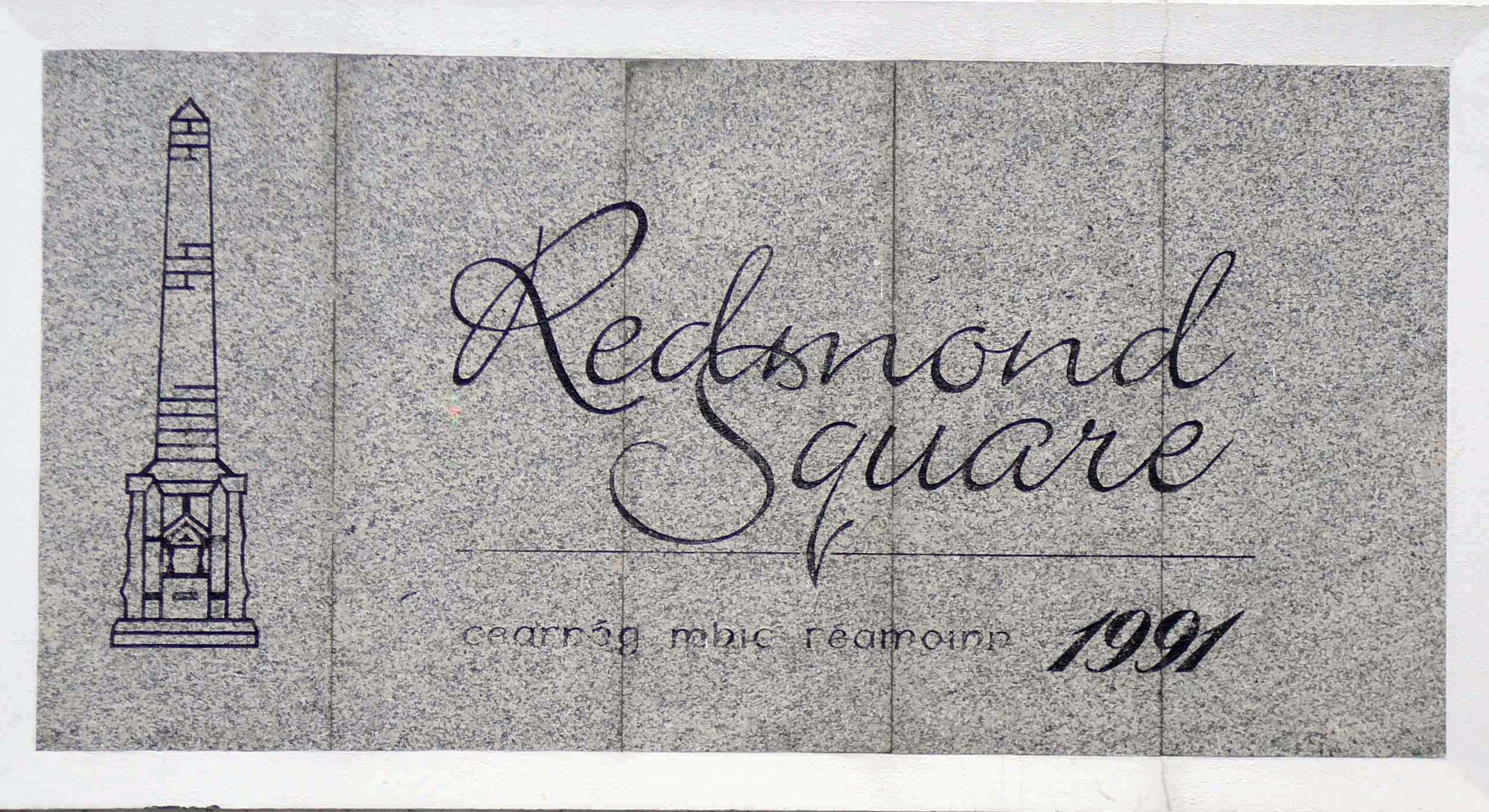
Wall plaque on the Redmond Square, Wexford

Redmond was an advocate of the removal of all civil and religious dis-abilities, as well as for a revision of the conditions of the tenants' position, and 'full compensation for the outlay of capital', who in those days were not entitled to compensation for improvements. He was in favour of extension of the franchise to 'those who by education and intelligence are entitled to enjoy it', but unlike later members of his family he did not advocate any form of independence or home rule for Ireland.

His memorial stands in Redmond Square near Wexford railway station, where these words are inscribed on the pedestal: 'My heart is with the city of Wexford. Nothing can extinguish that love but the cold soil of the grave'. John Redmond inherited Newtown Lodge, where he lived until his death, and his elder brother, Patrick, inherited Ballytrent House.

John Redmond was the first of one of Ireland's most famous political dynasties. His nephew William Archer Redmond sat for Wexford as a Home Rule Party M.P. from 1872 to 1880, and was the father of John Redmond, who succeeded Charles Stewart Parnell as the leader of the Irish Parliamentary Party. This last named Redmond was the brother of Willie Redmond, another M.P., and the father of William Redmond M.P. John Redmond's first cousin, John Walsingham Cooke Meredith, was the father of a notable Canadian family.

== Sources ==
- Terence Denman: A Lonely Grave - the life and death of William Redmond Irish Academic Press 1995.

Parliament of the United Kingdom
Preceded by John Thomas Devereux	Member of Parliament for Wexford; 1859–1865	Succeeded by Richard Joseph Devereux
