= John Thomas Devereux =

Irish politician

Member of Parliament for Wexford
- In office 4 August 1847 – 3 May 1859
- Preceded by: Thomas Esmonde
- Succeeded by: John Edward Redmond

Personal details
- Died: 31 December 1885
- Party: Whig
- Other political affiliations: Independent Irish Party; Repeal Association

John Thomas Devereux (died 31 December 1885) was an Irish Whig, Independent Irish Party and Repeal Association politician.

Devereux was elected as Repeal Association Member of Parliament (MP) for Wexford at the 1847 general election and, becoming an Independent Irish Party MP in 1852 and then a Whig in 1857, held the seat until 1859 when he did not seek re-election. His younger brother Richard Joseph Devereux was elected MP for Wexford in 1865.

Parliament of the United Kingdom
Preceded by Thomas Esmonde	Member of Parliament for Wexford; 1847–1859	Succeeded by John Edward Redmond
