= 1911 St Augustine's by-election =

UK Parliamentary by-election

The St Augustine's by-election of 1911 was held on 7 July 1911. The by-election was held due to the incumbent Conservative MP, Aretas Akers-Douglas becoming Viscount Chilston. It was won by the Conservative candidate Ronald McNeill, who was unopposed.
