= Wexford (UK Parliament constituency) =

UK parliamentary constituency in Ireland, 1801–1885

- Former borough constituency for the House of Commons
- County: County Wexford
- Borough: Wexford

1801–1885
- Seats: 1
- Created from: Wexford (IHC)
- Replaced by: South Wexford

The parliamentary borough of Wexford, Ireland, was represented in the House of Commons of the United Kingdom from 1801 to 1885 by a borough constituency electing one Member of Parliament (MP), on the electoral system of first past the post.

== History and boundaries ==
It succeeded the two-seat constituency of Wexford represented in the Irish House of Commons until the abolition of the Irish Parliament on 1 January 1801 under the Acts of Union 1800.

Its boundaries were reviewed in December 1831. The proposal was adopted in the Parliamentary Boundaries (Ireland) Act 1832, which defined the area of the parliamentary borough as:

From the Point on the South-east of the Town at which the Sea-shore is met by a Wall and Footpath which run a few Yards to the North of the Burial Ground which is near the Country House belonging to Mr. Talbot, along the said Wall to the Point at which the same meets the Fayeth Road; thence in a straight Line to the Flagstaff at the Signal Station; thence in a straight Line in the Direction of the Eastern Corner of Cromwell's Fort House to the Point at which such straight Line cuts the Wall of the Pleasure Grounds of Cromwell's Fort House; thence, Northward, along the Wall of the said Pleasure Grounds to the Duncormick Road; thence, Westward, still along the Wall of the said Pleasure Grounds, to the westernmost Point at which the same leaves the Duncormick Road, thus excluding the whole of the said Pleasure Grounds; thence in a straight Line in the Direction of the South-western Corner of the Distillery to the Point at which such straight Line cuts the Road which runs in front of the Distillery; thence along the last-mentioned Road to the Point at which the same crosses the Johnstown Road near the Bridge over the Bishop's Water; thence in a straight Line to the Point close to the Female Orphan House, at which the Northern Duncannon Road is met by a Road which leads therefrom into the New Ross Road; thence along the Road so leading into the New Ross Road to the Ruins of the southernmost of Two old Windmills; thence in a straight Line to a Point on the New Ross Road which is distant One hundred and sixty Yards (measured along the New Ross Road) to the North-west of the Obelisk; thence in a straight Line to the northernmost Point at which the Boundary of the Premises of Mr. Scallen, a Brewer, meets the Enniscorthy Road; thence, Westward, along the Enniscorthy Road to an Iron Gate in a Stone Wall distant about Three hundred and sixty Yards from the Centre of the Diocesan School; thence along the Road or Path which leads from the said Iron Gate to the Point at which the same meets the Sea-shore; thence along the Sea-shore to the Point first described.

Under the Representation of the People (Ireland) Act 1868, its boundaries were extended to include all of the municipal borough of Wexford. The old municipal borough had been abolished under the Municipal Corporations (Ireland) Act 1840, with a new royal charter granted in 1846 after a petition under s. 28 of that Act.

It was disenfranchised under the Redistribution of Seats Act 1885, which took effect at the 1885 general election. The town was thereafter represented by the county division of South Wexford.

== Members of Parliament ==
Election	MP	Party	Note
1801-01-01	Francis Leigh		1801: Co-opted; Resigned (appointed Escheator of Munster)
1801-02-20	Ponsonby Tottenham		
1802-07-09	Richard Nevill (Note: Stooks Smith names the MP 1802–1806 as Richard Neville Furness, 1807–1810 as Richard Neville, 1811–1813 as Robert Neville and 1814–1819 as Richard Neville. Walker names the MP for all these terms as Richard Nevill.)	Tory	
1806-11-10	Sir Robert Wigram, Bt	Tory	
1807-05-21	Richard Nevill	Tory	Resigned (appointed Steward of the Chiltern Hundreds)
1810-03-03	Capt. Peter Parker R.N.	Tory	Resigned (appointed Steward of the Chiltern Hundreds)
1811-07-01	Richard Nevill	Tory	Resigned (appointed Steward of the Manor of East Hendred)
1813-03-03	Vice Admiral John Fish	Tory	Resigned (appointed Escheator of Munster)
1814-08-09	Richard Nevill	Tory	Resigned (appointed Escheator of Ulster)
1819-03-01	Capt. Henry Evans R.N.	Tory	
1820-03-20	William Wigram	Tory	
1826-06-19	Rear Admiral Henry Evans	Tory	Resigned (appointed Steward of the Chiltern Hundreds)
1829-06-03	Robert Wigram (Note: From 1832 known as Robert Fitzwygram.)	Tory	Unseated on petition
1830-03-15 (Note: Not an election - date when the previous member was unseated and the petitioner was declared duly elected.)	Sir Edward Dering, Bt	Tory	Declared duly elected
1830-08-07	William Wigram	Tory	Unseated on petition
1831-02-21	Sir Edward Dering, Bt	Ultra-Tory	Declared duly elected
1831-05-06	Charles Arthur Walker	Whig	Re-elected as a candidate of the Repeal Association
1832-12-14	Charles Arthur Walker	Repeal	Re-elected as a candidate of a Liberal/Repealer pact
1841-07-12	Sir Thomas Esmonde, Bt	Whig	
1847-08-04	John Thomas Devereux	Repeal	Re-elected as an Independent Irish candidate
1852-07-09	John Thomas Devereux	Independent Irish	Re-elected as a Liberal candidate
1857-03-20	John Thomas Devereux	Whig	
1859-05-03	John Edward Redmond	Liberal	
1865-07-17	Richard Joseph Devereux	Liberal	Resigned
1872-04-26	William Archer Redmond	Home Rule	Died 1880
1880-11-24	Tim Healy	Home Rule	Joined new organisation
1882 (Note: Not an election - change of party allegiance.)	Tim Healy	Irish Parliamentary	Resigned to contest County Monaghan
1883-07-17	Willie Redmond	Irish Parliamentary	
1885-11-18	Constituency abolished		

== Elections ==
=== Elections in the 1830s ===
General election 1830: Wexford
Party	Candidate	Votes	%
Tory	William Wigram	31	52.5
Ultra-Tory	Edward Dering	28	47.5
Majority		3	5.0
Turnout		59	c. 36.9
Registered electors		c. 160	
Tory hold			

- On petition, Wigram was unseated and Dering was declared elected.

General election 1831: Wexford
Party	Candidate	Votes	%
Whig	Charles Arthur Walker	Unopposed	
Registered electors		160	
Whig gain from Tory			

General election 1832: Wexford
Party	Candidate	Votes	%
Repeal	Charles Arthur Walker	Unopposed	
Registered electors		269	
Repeal gain from Whig			

General election 1835: Wexford
Party	Candidate	Votes	%
Repeal (Whig)	Charles Arthur Walker	Unopposed	
Registered electors		373	
Repeal hold			

General election 1837: Wexford
Party	Candidate	Votes	%
Repeal (Whig)	Charles Arthur Walker	Unopposed	
Registered electors		361	
Repeal hold			

=== Elections in the 1840s ===
General election 1841: Wexford
Party	Candidate	Votes	%	±%
Whig	Thomas Esmonde	145	59.2	N/A
Conservative	James Bourne	100	40.8	New
Majority		45	18.4	N/A
Turnout		245	81.4	N/A
Registered electors		301		
Whig gain from Repeal		Swing	N/A	

General election 1847: Wexford
Party	Candidate	Votes	%	±%
Repeal	John Thomas Devereux	Unopposed		
Registered electors		375		
Repeal gain from Whig				

=== Elections in the 1850s ===
General election 1852: Wexford
Party	Candidate	Votes	%	±%
Independent Irish	John Thomas Devereux	Unopposed		
Registered electors		348		
Independent Irish gain from Repeal				

General election 1857: Wexford
Party	Candidate	Votes	%	±%
Whig	John Thomas Devereux	Unopposed		
Registered electors		314		
Whig gain from Independent Irish				

General election 1859: Wexford
Party	Candidate	Votes	%	±%
Liberal	John Redmond	Unopposed		
Registered electors		301		
Liberal hold				

=== Elections in the 1860s ===
General election 1865: Wexford
Party	Candidate	Votes	%	±%
Liberal	Richard Joseph Devereux	153	58.8	N/A
Liberal	John Redmond	107	41.2	N/A
Majority		46	17.6	N/A
Turnout		260	77.8	N/A
Registered electors		334		
Liberal hold		Swing	N/A	

General election 1868: Wexford
Party	Candidate	Votes	%	±%
Liberal	Richard Joseph Devereux	Unopposed		
Registered electors		520		
Liberal hold				

On petition, Devereux was unseated due to "informality" in the return, causing a by-election at which he was re-elected.

By-election, 26 February 1869: Wexford
Party	Candidate	Votes	%	±%
Liberal	Richard Joseph Devereux	Unopposed		
Registered electors		520		
Liberal hold				

=== Elections in the 1870s ===
Devereux resigned, causing a by-election.

By-election, 26 Apr 1872: Wexford
Party	Candidate	Votes	%	±%
Home Rule	William Archer Redmond	321	86.3	New
Home Rule	Walter Redmond	51	13.7	New
Majority		270	72.6	N/A
Turnout		372	69.5	N/A
Registered electors		535		
Home Rule gain from Liberal		Swing	N/A	

General election 1874: Wexford
Party	Candidate	Votes	%	±%
Home Rule	William Archer Redmond	323	81.6	N/A
Liberal	Sir Frederick Hughes, 7th Baronet	73	18.4	N/A
Majority		250	63.2	N/A
Turnout		396	79.0	N/A
Registered electors		501		
Home Rule gain from Liberal		Swing	N/A	

=== Elections in the 1880s ===
General election 1880: Wexford
Party	Candidate	Votes	%	±%
Home Rule	William Archer Redmond	292	75.5	−6.1
Liberal	Sir Frederick Hughes, 7th Baronet	95	24.5	+6.1
Majority		197	51.0	−12.2
Turnout		387	80.8	+1.8
Registered electors		479		
Home Rule hold		Swing	−6.1	

Redmond's death caused a by-election.

By-election, 24 Nov 1880: Wexford
Party	Candidate	Votes	%	±%
Home Rule	Tim Healy	Unopposed		
Registered electors		479		
Home Rule hold				

Healy resigned to stand at the 1883 by-election in County Monaghan, causing a by-election.

By-election, 17 July 1883: Wexford
Party	Candidate	Votes	%	±%
Irish Parliamentary	Willie Redmond	307	70.9	−4.6
Liberal	Charles Owen O'Conor	126	29.1	+4.6
Majority		181	41.8	−9.2
Turnout		433	83.0	+2.2
Registered electors		522		
Irish Parliamentary hold		Swing	−4.6	
