= Deeds (surname) =

Deeds is a surname. Notable people with the surname include:

- Creigh Deeds (born 1958), American politician from Virginia
- Edward Andrew Deeds (1874–1960), American engineer, inventor, and industrialist
- Pól Deeds (born 1978), Irish language expert
- Vince Deeds (born 1970), American politician from West Virginia

== See also ==
- Deedes
