= John Pemberton Plumptre =

British politician

John Pemberton Plumptre (1791–1864) was a British politician. He was elected as a Whig Member of Parliament for East Kent, along with Tory, Sir Edward Knatchbull in 1832, but had switched to the Conservatives by 1837. He continued to serve as MP until his resignation on 29 January 1852 on appointment as Steward of the Chiltern Hundreds. Theologian Richard Turnbull listed Plumptre, Sir Robert Inglis and Michael Sadler prominent figures in National Protestantism, who expounded a Protestant perspective on constitutional matters in Parliament.

He was educated at St John's College, Cambridge, admitted to Lincoln's Inn in 1813 and called to the bar in 1817. He married Catharine Matilda Methuen in 1818 and there were three daughters from the marriage. His mother's maiden name was Charlotte Pemberton. One of her brothers was the eminent physician Christopher Robert Pemberton. He succeeded to the family estate at Fredville, in the Hundred of Wingham, Kent upon his father, John Plumptre's death in 1827. His eldest daughter, Catherine Emma, died from a fever in 1838, aged 18; in 1850 he had published The Flower of Spring; or, A Call to the Young from the Early Grave of His Daughter. After retiring from Parliament he served as a magistrate and Deputy Lieutenant of Kent, and was Deputy Lord Warden of the Cinque Ports and a commissioner of Dover Harbour.

According to a genealogy tree (pedigree CXXVII) published in the 1851 tome The Royal Families of England, Scotland, and Wales, with their descendents by John Burke and John Bernard Burke, John Pemberton Plumptre was 15th in a direct line of descent from Edward III. He died aged 72. An obituary in The Kentish Gazette describes him as having a "deeply religious turn of mind" and reckoned his support of evangelist organisations was one of the "most distinguishing traits of his life". He is interred in the family vault in the Church of St. Mary the Virgin at Nonington. His estate passed to a nephew, C. J. Plumptre. Pemberton Plumptre's widow, Catharine Matilda died on 21 December 1886, aged 98.

== Film reference ==
Tom Hiddleston portrayed Plumptre in the 2007 BBC drama Miss Austen Regrets.

Parliament of the United Kingdom
| New constituency | Member of Parliament for East Kent; 1832 – 1852; With: Sir Edward Knatchbull, Bt to 1845; William Deedes from 1845 | Succeeded by William Deedes; Sir Brook Bridges, Bt |
