= Brook Bridges, 1st Baron FitzWalter =

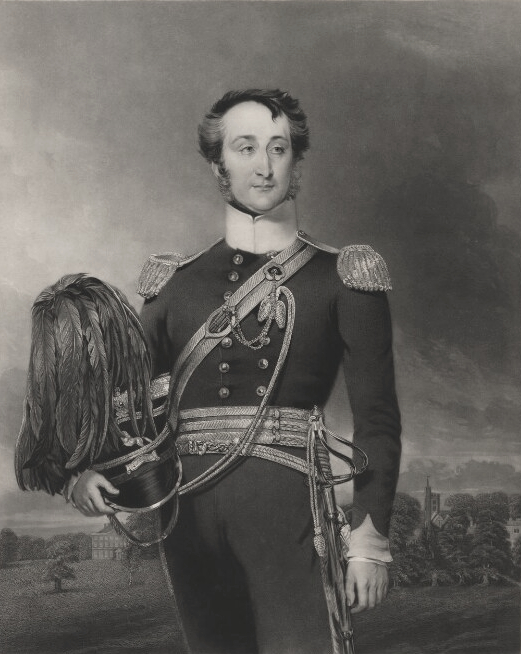
- 1842 portrait of Sir Brook Bridges in uniform
- Born: Brook William Bridges; 1801
- Died: 1875 (aged 73–74)
- Occupations: army officer, politician

Brook William Bridges, 1st Baron FitzWalter (2 June 1801 – 6 December 1875), known as Sir Brook Bridges, Bt, between 1829 and 1868, was a British peer and Conservative politician.

== Background ==
Born at Goodnestone, Kent, FitzWalter was the eldest son of Sir Brook William Bridges, 4th Baronet, and Eleanor, daughter of John Foote. He was educated at Winchester and Oriel College, Oxford.

== Political career ==
In 1841 FitzWalter claimed the ancient barony of FitzWalter, which had been in abeyance since 1756, as a descendant of Mary, sister of Benjamin Mildmay, 17th Baron FitzWalter. However, the House of Lords decided against terminating the abeyance in his favour. In February 1852 FitzWalter was elected to the House of Commons for Kent East, but lost the seat already in July the same year. He reclaimed the seat in 1857, and held it until 1868. The latter year he was created Baron FitzWalter, of Woodham Walter in the County of Essex.

== Family ==
In 1834, Bridges married his first cousin, Fanny, daughter of Lewis Cage and Fanny Bridges of Milgate Park, Kent. They had no children. She died in October 1874. Lord FitzWalter survived her by just over a year and died at Goodnestone Park, Goodnestone, in December 1875, aged 74. The barony became extinct on his death while he was succeeded in the baronetcy by his younger brother, Reverend George Bridges. The original barony of FitzWalter was called out of abeyance in 1924 in favour of Lord FitzWalter's great-nephew, Henry Fitzwalter Plumptre (the grandson of his sister Eleanor Bridges).

Parliament of the United Kingdom
| Preceded by John Pemberton Plumptre; William Deedes | Member of Parliament for Kent East; Feb 1852 – July 1852; With: William Deedes | Succeeded by William Deedes; Sir Edward Dering, Bt |
| Preceded by William Deedes; Sir Edward Dering, Bt | Member of Parliament for Kent East; 1857 – 1868; With: Sir Edward Dering, Bt 1857, 1863–1868; William Deedes 1857–1863 | Succeeded by Sir Edward Dering, Bt; Edward Leigh Pemberton |
Peerage of the United Kingdom
| New creation | Baron FitzWalter; 1868–1875 | Extinct |
Baronetage of Great Britain
| Preceded by Brook William Bridges | Baronet (of Goodneston); 1829–1875 | Succeeded by Brook George Bridges |
