= Aretas Akers-Douglas, 1st Viscount Chilston =

British politician

The Right Honourable The Viscount Chilston GBE PC JP DL
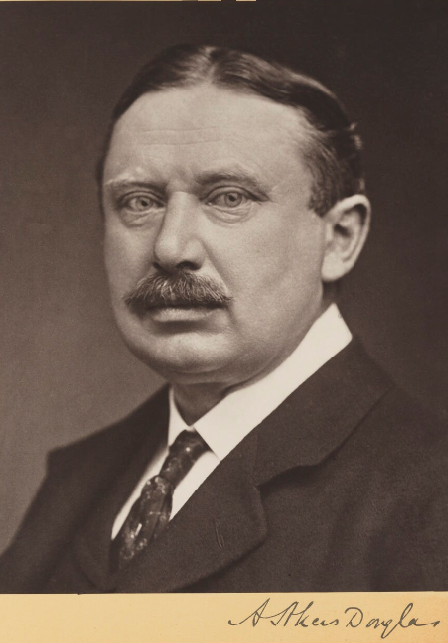

Home Secretary
- In office 12 July 1902 – 5 December 1905
- Monarch: Edward VII
- Prime Minister: Arthur Balfour
- Preceded by: Charles Ritchie
- Succeeded by: Herbert Gladstone

Personal details
- Born: Aretas Akers; 21 October 1851 West Malling, Kent
- Died: 15 January 1926 (aged 74) London
- Party: Conservative
- Spouse(s): Adeline Austen-Smith (d. 1929)
- Education: University College, Oxford

Aretas Akers-Douglas, 1st Viscount Chilston (born Aretas Akers; 21 October 1851 – 15 January 1926) was a British Conservative politician who sat in the House of Commons from 1880 until he was raised to the peerage in 1911. He notably served as Home Secretary under Arthur Balfour between 1902 and 1905. He was highly effective as Conservative Party whip, keeping the rank and file in line.

== Background and education ==
Akers-Douglas was born in West Malling, Kent, the son of Reverend Aretas Akers, parson of West Malling, and his wife Frances Maria, daughter of Francis Holles Brandram. He was educated at Eton and University College, Oxford, before being called to the Bar, Inner Temple, in 1875. That same year he took the additional surname of Douglas under royal licence in accordance with a relative's will.

== Political career ==
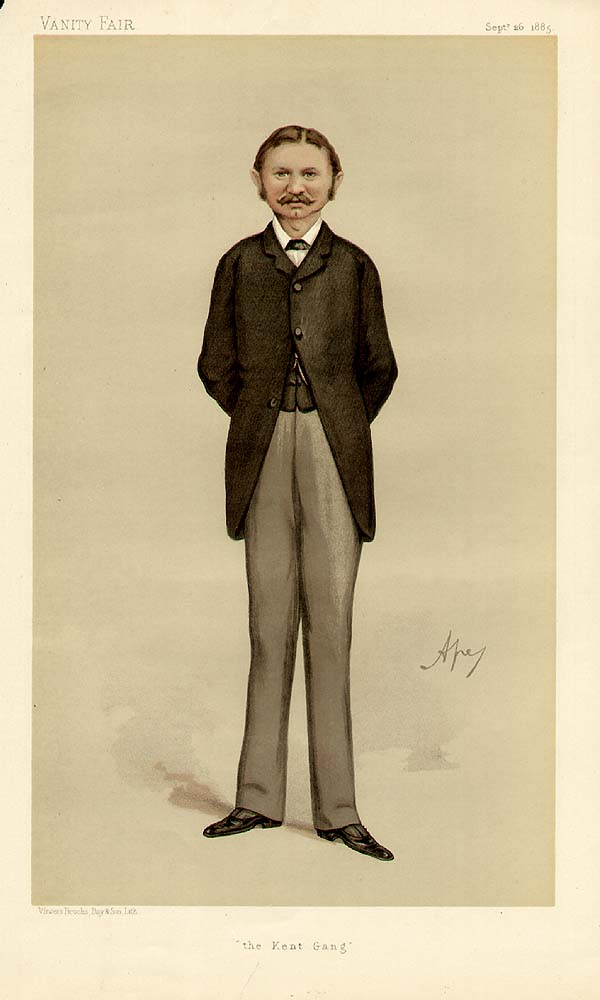
"The Kent Gang" As depicted by "Ape" (Carlo Pellegrini) in Vanity Fair, 26 September 1885

In 1880, Akers-Douglas was elected as Conservative member of parliament for East Kent and held it until it was divided under the Redistribution of Seats Act 1885. In 1883, Akers-Douglas was appointed whip to the Conservatives, where he proved highly effective in keeping the back-benchers in line and working with the party leader Lord Salisbury.

In the 1885 general election, he was elected MP for St Augustine's in the county of Kent. He became Parliamentary Secretary to the Treasury, and retained this post (with a short interval in 1886 when Gladstone returned to power) for the next seven years. He became a Privy Counsellor in 1891.

In 1895, Akers-Douglas was appointed First Commissioner of Works, with a seat in the Cabinet. Seven years later, when Arthur Balfour became Prime Minister, he became Home Secretary on 11 August 1902, and resigned three and a half years later when the Liberals took power.

In 1911, Akers-Douglas was created Viscount Chilston, of Boughton Malherbe in the County of Kent, and Baron Douglas of Baads, in the County of Midlothian. The viscountcy was named for his country house at Chilston Park. During the First World War, Lord Chilston was Chief County Director for the British Red Cross Society and St John Ambulance, in recognition of which he was appointed Knight Grand Cross of the Order of the British Empire (GBE) in the 1920 civilian war honours. Apart from his political career he was a deputy lieutenant and justice of the peace for Kent, Edinburgh and Dumfries and a lieutenant in the East Kent Yeoman Cavalry. He was chairman of the Midland Counties Electric Supply Company Limited.

== Family ==
Lord Chilston married Adeline Mary, daughter of Horatio Austen-Smith, in 1875. They had two sons and five daughters. He died at his London home in January 1926, aged 74, and was buried at Boughton Malherbe, Kent. He was succeeded in his titles by his eldest son, Aretas, who became British Ambassador to Russia. Lady Chilston died in February 1929.

== Notes ==
Parliament of the United Kingdom
Preceded by Edward Leigh Pemberton; William Deedes	Member of Parliament for East Kent; 1880–1885; With: Edward Leigh Pemberton	Constituency abolished
New constituency	Member of Parliament for St Augustine's; 1885–1911	Succeeded by Ronald John McNeill
Political offices
Preceded by Lord Richard Grosvenor	Parliamentary Secretary to the Treasury; 1885–1886	Succeeded by Arnold Morley
Preceded by Arnold Morley	Parliamentary Secretary to the Treasury; 1886–1892	Succeeded by Hon. Edward Marjoribanks
Preceded by Herbert John Gladstone	First Commissioner of Works; 1895–1902	Succeeded by The Lord Windsor
Preceded by Charles Ritchie	Home Secretary; 1902–1905	Succeeded by Herbert Gladstone
Peerage of the United Kingdom
New creation	Viscount Chilston; 1911–1926	Succeeded by Aretas Akers-Douglas
