= Sir Thomas Esmonde, 9th Baronet =

Irish politician, died 1868

Sir Thomas Esmonde

Member of Parliament for Wexford
- In office 12 July 1841 – 4 August 1847
- Preceded by: Charles Arthur Walker
- Succeeded by: John Thomas Devereux

Personal details
- Born: 10 December 1786
- Died: 31 December 1868 (aged 82)
- Party: Whig
- Parent(s): Dr. John Esmonde and Helen O'Callan

Sir Thomas Esmonde, 9th Baronet (10 December 1786 – 31 December 1868) was an Irish Whig politician.

Esmonde was the son of John Esmonde and Helen née O'Callan. He first married Mary Payne, daughter of E. Payne in 1812, and after her death in 1840, remarried to Sophia Maria Rowe, daughter of Ebenezer Radford Rowe, in 1856. Neither wife bore his children.

He was elected Whig MP for Wexford at the 1841 general election and held the seat until 1847 when he did not seek re-election.

He succeeded to the Baronetcy of Ballynastragh in 1803 upon the death of Sir Thomas Esmonde, 8th Baronet. Upon his own death in 1868, the title was inherited by Sir John Esmonde, 10th Baronet.

He was a member of the Reform Club and was, at some point, appointed a Privy Counsellor.

Parliament of the United Kingdom
Preceded by Charles Arthur Walker	Member of Parliament for Wexford; 1841–1847	Succeeded by John Thomas Devereux
Baronetage of Ireland
Preceded by Thomas Esmonde	Baronet (of Ballynastragh); 1803 – 1868	Succeeded by John Esmonde
