= Joseph Richard Cox =

Irish politician

Joseph Richard Cox (1852 – 13 January 1934) was an Irish politician.

From Kilmore, County Roscommon, Joseph Cox was educated at St. Mel's College, County Longford. He became secretary to the Lord Mayor of Dublin. He was elected MP for East Clare in 1885, and was re-elected, unopposed, in 1886. Following the Parnell Split, he became an anti-Parnellite, and in the 1892 general election he was defeated by the Parnellite candidate, William Redmond. Cox launched an election petition, aiming to unseat Redmond, claiming corrupt practices and intimidation. The case was lost, however. Two years later he was declared insolvent, following the award of costs against him following the case. At that time, he had been acting as London agent for a wine company for a number of years.

== Endnotes ==
Parliament of the United Kingdom
New constituency	Member of Parliament for East Clare; 1885 – 1892	Succeeded by Willie Redmond
