= Charles Arthur Walker =

Irish politician (c.1790 – 1873)

Member of the British Parliament for Wexford
- In office 1831–1841

Personal details
- Born: c. 1790
- Died: 29 October 1873
- Party: Irish Repeal Association

Charles Arthur Walker (c.1790 – 29 October 1873) was an Irish Member of Parliament.

== Biography ==
Walker was born into a Protestant family at Tykillen, in County Wexford. He studied law at Trinity College Dublin, but was not called to the bar. He was a deputy-lieutenant of the county, but later stated that he had initially avoided taking other public offices as he was "of retired habits", and preferred to spend his time on country pursuits.

Walker stood in Wexford for the Irish Repeal Association at the 1831 UK general election, and was elected. However, he stated that he would only vote for a repeal of the Act of Union if injustices around ballots and poor laws were perpetuated. Walker held his seat until he stood down at the 1841 UK general election. He died in 1873, still living at Tykillen.

Parliament of the United Kingdom
Preceded by Edward Dering	Member of Parliament for Wexford; 1831–1841	Succeeded by Thomas Esmonde
