= Sir Edward Knatchbull, 9th Baronet =

British politician (1781–1849)

The Right Honourable Sir Edward Knatchbull Bt FRS
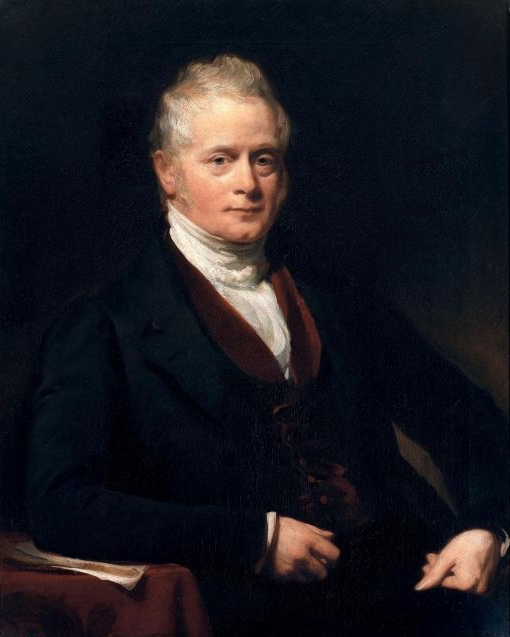
- Portrait of Knatchbull by Thomas Phillips

Paymaster General
- In office 8 September 1841 – 1 March 1845
- Prime Minister: Sir Robert Peel, Bt
- Preceded by: Hon. Edward Stanley
- Succeeded by: Hon. Bingham Baring

Paymaster of the Forces
- In office 23 December 1834 – 8 April 1835
- Prime Minister: Sir Robert Peel, Bt
- Preceded by: Lord John Russell
- Succeeded by: Sir Henry Parnell, Bt

Personal details
- Born: 20 December 1781
- Died: 24 May 1849 (aged 67) Mersham Hatch, Kent
- Party: Tory/Ultra-Tory
- Spouse(s): (1) Annabella Honywood (d. 1814) (2) Fanny Knight (1793–1882)
- Parent(s): Sir Edward Knatchbull, 8th Baronet (Father); Mary Knatchbull (Mother)
- Education: Christ Church, Oxford

Sir Edward Knatchbull, 9th Baronet, PC, FRS (20 December 1781 – 24 May 1849) was a British Tory politician and baronet of Mersham Hatch in Kent. He emerged as one of the parliamentary leaders of the Ultra-Tory revolt against Catholic Emancipation in 1828 and 1829, and later held office under Sir Robert Peel as Paymaster of the Forces from 1834 to 1835 and as Paymaster General from 1841 to 1845. He sat in the House of Commons for the county of Kent from 1819 to 1831 and for the new Eastern division of Kent from 1832 to 1845. By his second marriage to Fanny Catherine Knight, niece of the novelist Jane Austen, Knatchbull was the father of Edward, 1st Baron Brabourne, who in 1884 published Austen letters that had passed to him after his mother's death.

== Background and education ==
Knatchbull was born on 20 December 1781, the son of Sir Edward Knatchbull, 8th Baronet, and his wife Mary, daughter and heiress of William Western Hugessen of Provender House in Norton, Kent. He was educated at Christ Church, Oxford, matriculating in 1800, and was elected a Fellow of the Royal Society in 1802. In 1803 he was called to the Bar at Lincoln's Inn. He succeeded his father in the baronetcy in 1819.

== Member for Kent and the Catholic question ==
Knatchbull was returned for the county of Kent at a by-election in November 1819, taking the seat left vacant by his father's death, and held the seat at successive general elections until 1831, when he did not contest the poll.

In 1828 and 1829 Knatchbull emerged as one of the parliamentary leaders of the so-called Ultra-Tories, the body of Tory members opposed to the Catholic Relief Act that the Wellington government, with Peel as leader of the House of Commons, prepared to introduce. The revolt failed in the immediate sense: the Act passed in April 1829 and Catholic emancipation became law. The dispute placed Knatchbull among the Tory malcontents of 1829–1831; in November 1830 he led his following into the opposition lobby on Sir Henry Parnell's motion for a reduction of the civil list, after which the Wellington government was placed in a minority and resigned.

The Reform Act 1832 divided the historic Kent county constituency into Eastern and Western divisions, and at the 1832 general election Knatchbull and John Pemberton Plumptre were elected as the first members for the new East Kent constituency. Knatchbull held East Kent until early 1845, when he resigned by taking the Chiltern Hundreds, ending twenty-six continuous years in the House of Commons.

== Office under Peel ==
Knatchbull was sworn of the Privy Council on 15 December 1834, on the formation of Peel's First Ministry, and served as Paymaster of the Forces from 23 December 1834 until the government's defeat in April 1835. When Peel returned to office at the head of a majority Conservative government in 1841, Knatchbull was appointed Paymaster General, a post he held until his retirement in early 1845. The Dictionary of National Biography attributed his retirement to ill-health and domestic affliction, and rejected later claims that it arose from internal differences in Peel's cabinet, which developed only after he had left office.

== Family ==
Knatchbull married twice. On 25 August 1806 he married Annabella Christiana Honywood, daughter of Sir John Honywood, 4th Baronet and Hon. Frances Courtenay. They had six children, including Norton Joseph Knatchbull, the eventual 10th Baronet, and Mary Dorothea Knatchbull, who married Edward Knight, eldest son of Edward Austen Knight of Godmersham Park and brother of Knatchbull's eventual second wife. Annabella died in 1814.

On 24 October 1820 Knatchbull married, as his second wife, Fanny Catherine Knight, the eldest daughter of Edward Austen Knight of Godmersham Park, Kent. Edward Knight had been adopted in childhood by the wealthy Knight cousins of Godmersham, whose surname he took; he was a brother of the novelist Jane Austen, and Fanny was one of Austen's nieces and correspondents. By the second marriage, Knatchbull had nine further children, including Edward Hugessen Knatchbull-Hugessen, 1st Baron Brabourne, who in 1884 edited and published Austen letters that came into his possession after his mother's death.

== Death ==
Knatchbull died at Mersham Hatch on 24 May 1849, aged 67, and was succeeded in the baronetcy by his son from his first marriage, Norton. His widow Fanny survived him by thirty-three years, dying on 24 December 1882; the Austen letters in her possession then passed to their son Edward, 1st Baron Brabourne.

Parliament of the United Kingdom
Preceded by Sir Edward Knatchbull, 8th Bt; William Philip Honywood	Member of Parliament for Kent; 1819–1831; With: William Philip Honywood 1819–1830; Thomas Law Hodges 1830–1831	Succeeded by Thomas Law Hodges; Thomas Rider
New constituency	Member of Parliament for East Kent; 1832–1845; With: John Pemberton Plumptre	Succeeded by John Pemberton Plumptre; William Deedes
Political offices
Preceded by Lord John Russell	Paymaster of the Forces; 1834–1835	Succeeded by Sir Henry Parnell, Bt
Preceded by Hon. Edward Stanley	Paymaster General; 1841–1845	Succeeded by Hon. Bingham Baring
Baronetage of England
Preceded by Edward Knatchbull	Baronet (of Mersham Hatch); 1819–1849	Succeeded by Norton Joseph Knatchbull
