= East Kent (constituency) =

Former parliamentary constituency in the United Kingdom

- Former county constituency for the House of Commons
- Context of 1832-1868. Extract from 1837 result: the blue land forming the south-east corner.
- County: Kent

1832–1885
- Seats: 2
- Created from: Kent
- Replaced by: Faversham; Ashford; Isle of Thanet; St Augustine's

East Kent (formally known as "Kent, Eastern") was a county constituency in Kent in South East England. It returned two Members of Parliament (MPs) to the House of Commons of the Parliament of the United Kingdom, elected by the first past the post system.

== History ==
The constituency was created by the Reform Act 1832 for the 1832 general election, and abolished by the Redistribution of Seats Act 1885 for the 1885 general election.

All three two-member constituencies in Kent were abolished in 1885: East Kent, Mid Kent and West Kent. They were replaced by eight new single-member constituencies:

- Ashford
- Dartford
- Faversham
- Isle of Thanet
- Medway
- St Augustine's
- Sevenoaks
- Tunbridge

== Boundaries ==
1832–1885: The Lathes of St. Augustine and Shepway (including the Liberty of Romney Marsh), and the Upper Division of the Lathe of Scray.

== Members of Parliament ==
Election	1st Member	1st Party	2nd Member	2nd Party
1832	John Pemberton Plumptre	Whig	Sir Edward Knatchbull, Bt	Tory
1834	John Pemberton Plumptre	Whig	Sir Edward Knatchbull, Bt	Conservative
1835	John Pemberton Plumptre	Conservative	Sir Edward Knatchbull, Bt	Conservative
1845 by-election	John Pemberton Plumptre	Conservative	William Deedes	Conservative
February 1852 by-election	Sir Brook Bridges, Bt (Note: Later Baron FitzWalter)	Conservative	William Deedes	Conservative
July 1852	Sir Edward Dering, Bt	Peelite	William Deedes	Conservative
March 1857	Sir Edward Dering, Bt	Peelite	Sir Brook Bridges, Bt	Conservative
December 1857 by-election	William Deedes	Conservative	Sir Brook Bridges, Bt	Conservative
1863 by-election	Sir Edward Dering, Bt	Liberal	Sir Brook Bridges, Bt	Conservative
May 1868 by-election	Sir Edward Dering, Bt	Liberal	Edward Leigh Pemberton	Conservative
November 1868	Hon. George Milles (Note: Later Earl Sondes)	Conservative	Edward Leigh Pemberton	Conservative
1875 by-election	Sir Wyndham Knatchbull, Bt	Conservative	Edward Leigh Pemberton	Conservative
1876 by-election	William Deedes	Conservative	Edward Leigh Pemberton	Conservative
1880	Aretas Akers-Douglas (Note: Later Viscount Chilston)	Conservative	Edward Leigh Pemberton	Conservative
1885	constituency abolished			

== Election results ==
=== Elections in the 1830s ===
General election 1832: East Kent
Party	Candidate	Votes	%
Whig	John Pemberton Plumptre	3,476	36.8
Tory	Edward Knatchbull	3,344	35.4
Tory	William Richard Cosway	2,627	27.8
Whig	William Percy Honeywood Courtenay	4	0.0
Turnout		6,144	87.4
Registered electors		7,026	
Majority		132	1.4
Whig win (new seat)			
Majority		717	7.6
Tory win (new seat)			

General election 1835: East Kent
Party	Candidate	Votes	%
Conservative	John Pemberton Plumptre	Unopposed	
Conservative	Edward Knatchbull	Unopposed	
Registered electors		7,087	
Conservative gain from Whig			
Conservative hold			

General election 1837: East Kent
Party	Candidate	Votes	%
Conservative	Edward Knatchbull	3,607	40.8
Conservative	John Pemberton Plumptre	3,029	34.3
Whig	Thomas Rider	2,205	24.9
Majority		824	9.4
Turnout		5,478	87.4
Registered electors		7,293	
Conservative hold			
Conservative hold			

=== Elections in the 1840s ===
General election 1841: East Kent
Party	Candidate	Votes	%	±%
Conservative	Edward Knatchbull	Unopposed		
Conservative	John Pemberton Plumptre	Unopposed		
Registered electors		7,553		
Conservative hold				
Conservative hold				

Knatchbull was appointed Paymaster General, causing a by-election.

By-election, 20 September 1841: East Kent
Party	Candidate	Votes	%	±%
Conservative	Edward Knatchbull	Unopposed		
Conservative hold				

Knatchbull resigned by accepting the office of Steward of the Chiltern Hundreds, causing a by-election.

By-election, 3 March 1845: East Kent
Party	Candidate	Votes	%	±%
Conservative	William Deedes	Unopposed		
Conservative hold				

General election 1847: East Kent
Party	Candidate	Votes	%	±%
Conservative	William Deedes	Unopposed		
Conservative	John Pemberton Plumptre	Unopposed		
Registered electors		7,323		
Conservative hold				
Conservative hold				

=== Elections in the 1850s ===
Plumptre resigned, causing a by-election.

By-election, 16 February 1852: East Kent
Party	Candidate	Votes	%	±%
Conservative	William Deedes	2,480	52.0	N/A
Peelite	Edward Dering	2,289	48.0	N/A
Majority		191	4.0	N/A
Turnout		4,769	67.0	N/A
Registered electors		7,119		
Conservative hold		Swing	N/A	

General election 1852: East Kent
Party	Candidate	Votes	%	±%
Peelite	Edward Dering	3,063	36.9	N/A
Conservative	William Deedes	2,879	34.7	N/A
Conservative	Brook Bridges	2,356	28.4	N/A
Majority		707	8.5	N/A
Turnout		4,149 (est)	58.3 (est)	N/A
Registered electors		7,119		
Peelite gain from Conservative		Swing	N/A	
Conservative hold		Swing	N/A	

General election 1857: East Kent
Party	Candidate	Votes	%	±%
Conservative	Brook Bridges	2,379	33.6	+5.2
Peelite	Edward Dering	2,358	33.3	−3.6
Conservative	William Deedes	2,216	31.3	−3.4
Radical	E A Acheson	127	1.8	New
Turnout		3,540 (est)	44.3 (est)	−14.0
Registered electors		8,000		
Majority		21	0.3	N/A
Conservative hold		Swing	+3.5	
Majority		142	2.0	−6.5
Peelite hold		Swing	−2.3	

Dering resigned due to ill health, causing a by-election.

By-election, 10 December 1857: East Kent
Party	Candidate	Votes	%	±%
Conservative	William Deedes	Unopposed		
Conservative gain from Peelite				

General election 1859: East Kent
Party	Candidate	Votes	%	±%
Conservative	Brook Bridges	Unopposed		
Conservative	William Deedes	Unopposed		
Registered electors		8,312		
Conservative hold				
Conservative gain from Peelite				

=== Elections in the 1860s ===
Deedes' death caused a by-election.

By-election, 5 January 1863: East Kent
Party	Candidate	Votes	%	±%
Liberal	Edward Dering	2,777	50.8	New
Conservative	Sir Norton Knatchbull, 10th Baronet	2,690	49.2	N/A
Majority		87	1.6	N/A
Turnout		5,467	77.1	N/A
Registered electors		7,092		
Liberal gain from Conservative		Swing	N/A	

General election 1865: East Kent
Party	Candidate	Votes	%	±%
Conservative	Brook Bridges	3,208	34.4	N/A
Liberal	Edward Dering	3,195	34.3	N/A
Conservative	Sir Norton Knatchbull, 10th Baronet	2,919	31.3	N/A
Turnout		6,259 (est)	75.9 (est)	N/A
Registered electors		8,250		
Majority		13	0.1	N/A
Conservative hold		Swing	N/A	
Majority		276	3.0	N/A
Liberal gain from Conservative		Swing	N/A	

Bridges was elevated to the peerage, becoming Lord FitzWalter and causing a by-election.

By-election, 2 May 1868: East Kent
Party	Candidate	Votes	%	±%
Conservative	Edward Leigh Pemberton	3,606	53.7	−12.0
Liberal	Henry Tufton	3,109	46.3	+12.0
Majority		497	7.4	+7.3
Turnout		6,715	81.4	+5.5
Registered electors		8,250		
Conservative hold		Swing	−12.0	

General election 1868: East Kent
Party	Candidate	Votes	%	±%
Conservative	Edward Leigh Pemberton	5,231	26.7	−7.7
Conservative	George Milles	5,104	26.0	−5.3
Liberal	Henry Tufton	4,685	23.9	+6.7
Liberal	Sir John Frederick Croft, 2nd Baronet	4,579	23.4	+6.2
Majority		419	2.1	+2.0
Majority		652	3.3	N/A
Turnout		9,800 (est)	74.8 (est)	−1.1
Registered electors		13,107		
Conservative hold		Swing	−7.0	
Conservative gain from Liberal		Swing	−6.0	

=== Elections in the 1870s ===
General election 1874: East Kent
Party	Candidate	Votes	%	±%
Conservative	George Milles	5,424	35.8	+9.8
Conservative	Edward Leigh Pemberton	5,405	35.7	+9.0
Liberal	Henry Tufton	4,308	28.5	−18.8
Majority		1,097	7.2	+5.1
Turnout		9,723 (est)	77.1 (est)	+2.3
Registered electors		12,605		
Conservative hold		Swing	+9.9	
Conservative hold		Swing	+9.5	

Milles succeeded to the peerage, becoming Lord Sondes.

By-election, 27 Jan 1875: East Kent
Party	Candidate	Votes	%	±%
Conservative	Wyndham Knatchbull	Unopposed		
Conservative hold				

Knatchbull resigned, causing a by-election.

By-election, 26 July 1876: East Kent
Party	Candidate	Votes	%	±%
Conservative	William Deedes	Unopposed		
Conservative hold				

=== Elections in the 1880s ===
General election 1880: East Kent
Party	Candidate	Votes	%	±%
Conservative	Aretas Akers-Douglas	5,541	34.7	−1.1
Conservative	Edward Leigh Pemberton	5,473	34.3	−1.4
Liberal	Edmund Francis Davis	4,959	31.0	+2.5
Majority		514	3.3	−3.9
Turnout		10,500 (est)	79.7 (est)	+2.6
Registered electors		13,169		
Conservative hold		Swing	−1.2	
Conservative hold		Swing	−1.3	
