= Richard Joseph Devereux =

Politician, died 1883

Member of Parliament for Wexford
- In office 17 July 1865 – 26 April 1872
- Preceded by: John Edward Redmond
- Succeeded by: William Archer Redmond

Personal details
- Born: 1829
- Died: 1883 (aged 53–54)
- Party: Liberal
- Relatives: John Thomas Devereux (brother)

Richard Joseph Devereux (1829–1883) was an Irish Liberal politician.

Devereux was elected MP as the Member of Parliament (MP) for Wexford—a seat his brother John Thomas Devereux held between 1847 and 1859—in the 1865 general election and held the seat until he resigned in 1872.

Parliament of the United Kingdom
Preceded by John Edward Redmond	Member of Parliament for Wexford; 1865 – 1872	Succeeded by William Archer Redmond
