= Edward Leigh Pemberton =

English politician

Sir Edward Leigh Pemberton KCB DL (14 May 1823 – 31 January 1910) was an English Conservative Party politician.

Leigh Pemberton was the son of Edward Leigh Pemberton by Charlotte Cox, daughter of Samuel Compton Cox. He was the nephew of Lord Kingsdown.

He was elected to the House of Commons as a Member of Parliament (MP) for East Kent at a by-election in May 1868, after the sitting Conservative MP Sir Brook Bridges had been ennobled as Baron FitzWalter. Leigh Pemberton was re-elected at the general election in November 1868, and held the seat until the East Kent constituency was abolished at the 1885 general election. In 1898 he was made a Knight Commander of the Order of the Bath.

He was elected as chairman of Borden School Trust during its conception in 1875. Even when he left the Board and missed several meetings, he was immediately elected Chairman when he resumed attendance and all continued as though nothing had happened.

Leigh Pemberton married Matilda Catherine Emma Noel, daughter of Reverend Francis James Noel, in 1849. She died in January 1906. Leigh Pemberton died in January 1910, aged 86. His son Robert Leigh Pemberton was the grandfather of Robin Leigh-Pemberton, who was created a life peer as Baron Kingsdown in 1993.

Parliament of the United Kingdom
Preceded by Sir Brook Bridges, Bt; Sir Edward Dering, Bt	Member of Parliament for East Kent; 1868 – 1885; With: Sir Edward Dering, Bt to Nov 1868; George Milles 1868–1875; Sir Wyndham Knatchbull, Bt 1875–1876; William Deedes 1876–1880; Aretas Akers-Douglas from 1880	Constituency abolished
