= Samuel Compton Cox =

British barrister, judge and legal writer

Samuel Compton Cox M.A.
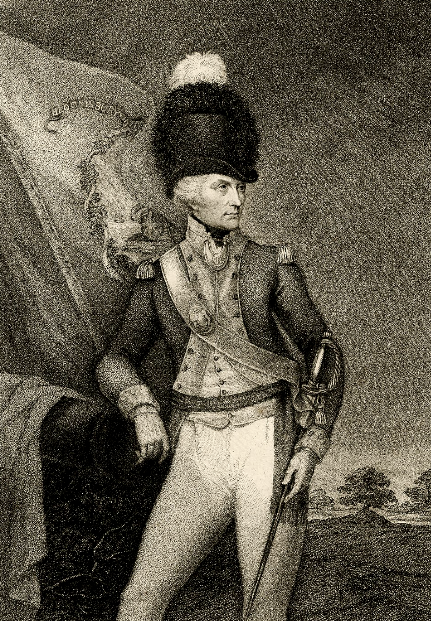
- Portrait of Samuel Compton Cox from 1799, in militia officer uniform
- Born: 1757
- Died: 1839
- Occupation: barrister

Samuel Compton Cox (1757–1839) was a British barrister, judge and legal writer. He became a Master in Chancery in 1804.

== Life ==
He was the son of the barrister Samuel Cox. He was educated at Westminster School, where he took part in the 1770 production of the Latin comedy Andria by Terence, playing the role of Mysis.

Cox matriculated at Trinity College, Cambridge in 1774, graduating B.A. 1778, and becoming a Fellow of the college in 1779. He graduated M.A. in 1781. Meanwhile, he was admitted to the Inner Temple in 1775. He migrated to Lincoln's Inn in January 1781 and was called to the bar later that year.

Made a commissioner of bankrupts in 1787, Cox held the position to 1798. That year, he became Second Justice of Carmarthen. In 1804 he instead took on the position of Master in chancery. He was an active militia officer at this period, commanding the six companies of the Bloomsbury and Inns of Court Volunteers.

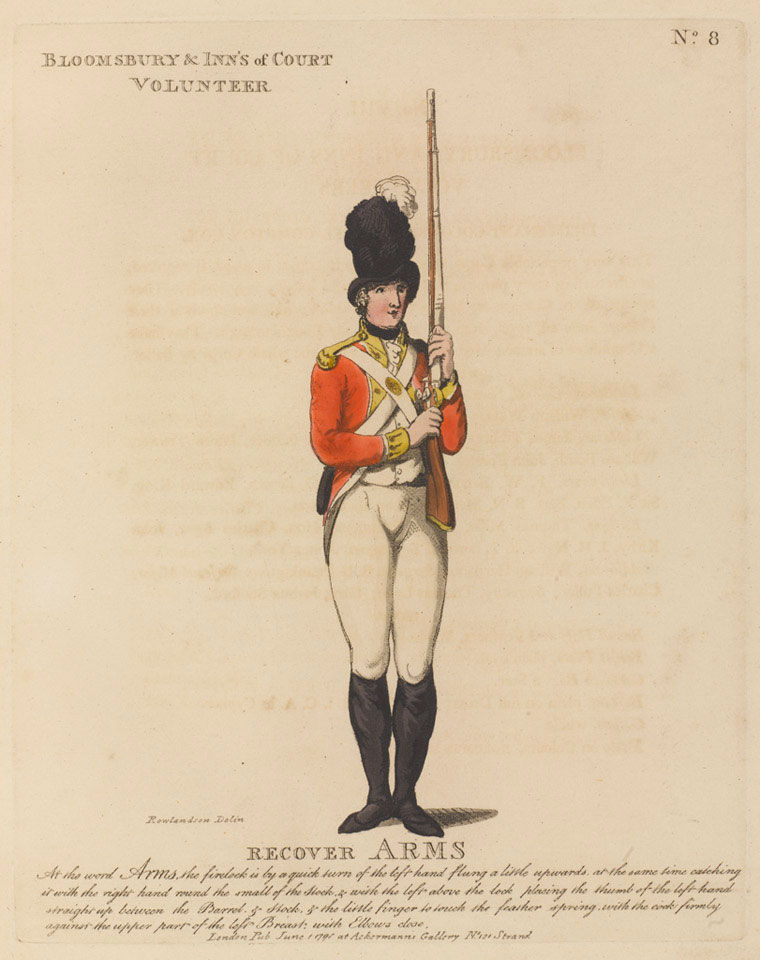
Militiaman of the Bloomsbury and Inns of Court Volunteers, 1798 aquatint

Cox was treasurer of the Foundling Hospital from 1806 to 1839. He died there, on 25 March 1839. He has a memorial there, by John Graham Lough, representing a sarcophagus with foundlings. It is in the chapel, having formerly been over a door. Cox was buried in the catacombs beneath the chapel. A sermon for him by Josiah Forshall, the hospital's chaplain, was published in 1841. Cox's library was sold at auction in London by R. H. Evans on 16 July 1839 (and three following days); a copy of the catalogue is held at Cambridge University Library (shelfmark Munby.c.145(10)).

== Works ==
Cox added scholarly notes to the fourth edition (1787) and fifth edition (1793) of the equity case reports of William Peere Williams (1664–1736). There was a sixth edition in 1826, with further notes by others (John Boscawen Monro, William Loftus Lowndes, and James Randall).

- Reports of Cases Argued and Determined in the High Court of Chancery: And of Some Special Cases Adjudged in the Court of King's Bench (1790, Dublin, 4th edition vol. II)
- Reports of Cases Argued and Determined in the High Court of Chancery: And of Some Special Cases Adjudged in the Court of King's Bench (1826, vol. II)

The original work, in three volumes, was edited by William Peere Williams the younger, and appeared 1740–1744.

"Cox Eq Cas" is a standard abbreviation for nominate reports, also known as "Cox's Equity Cases" or "Cox's Equity", or "Cox's Chancery Cases". It refers to the two volumes of Cases Determined in the Courts of Equity: From 1783 to 1796 Inclusive (1816).

== Family ==
Cox married in 1787 Anne Pott, daughter of Percival Pott. Of their children:

- Anna, the eldest daughter, married Charles Pott of the Foundling Hospital.
- Charlotte married Edward Leigh Pemberton (1795–1877) of Torry Hill, and was mother of Edward Leigh Pemberton the politician.
- Sarah married in 1814 the physician Edward Thomas Monro (1789–1856).
- Eliza, fourth daughter, married in 1818 William Loftus Lowndes, son of Richard Lowndes of Dorking.
