= Sir Edward Dering, 8th Baronet =

British politician

Sir Edward Cholmley Dering, 8th Baronet (19 November 1807 – 1 April 1896) was a British Liberal Party politician.

== Biography ==
He was born the only son of Edward Dering of Barham, Kent and Henrietta, the daughter and coheiress of Richard Nevill of Furness, County Kildare, and educated at Harrow school (1821–24) and Christ Church, Oxford (1827). He succeeded his father when only an infant in 1808 and his grandfather, Sir Edward Dering, 7th Baronet of Surrenden Dering, as the 8th baronet on 30 June 1811.

He entered Parliament as the MP for Wexford in 1830 and 1831, followed by New Romney in 1831 and Kent East from 1852 to 1857 and 1863 to 1868. He was High Sheriff of Kent for 1836–37.

He married in 1832, the Hon. Jane Edwardes, daughter of William Edwardes, 2nd Baron Kensington, and had 6 sons and a daughter. He was succeeded in the baronetcy by his son Sir Henry Dering, 9th Baronet.

Parliament of the United Kingdom
Preceded by Robert Wigram	Member of Parliament for Wexford; 1830	Succeeded by Sir Robert Wigram
Preceded by Robert Wigram	Member of Parliament for Wexford; 1831	Succeeded by Charles Arthur Walker
Preceded by William Miles; Sir Roger Gresley	Member of Parliament for New Romney; 1831–1832; With: William Miles	Constituency abolished
Preceded by William Deedes; Sir Brook Bridges, Bt	Member of Parliament for Kent East; 1852–1857; With: William Deedes 1852–1857; Sir Brook Bridges, Bt 1857	Succeeded by Sir Brook Bridges, Bt; William Deedes
Preceded by Sir Brook Bridges, Bt; William Deedes	Member of Parliament for Kent East; 1863–1868; With: Sir Brook Bridges, Bt 1863–1868; Edward Leigh Pemberton 1868	Succeeded by Edward Leigh Pemberton; George Watson Milles
Honorary titles
Preceded by John Ward	High Sheriff of Kent; 1836	Succeeded by Francis Bradley
Baronetage of England
Preceded by Edward Dering	Baronet (of Surrenden Dering); 1811–1896	Succeeded by Henry Nevill Dering
