= William Deedes (East Kent MP, born 1834) =

English cricketer and politician

William Deedes (11 October 1834 – 27 May 1887) was an English cricketer and a Conservative Party politician. He was born in Saltwood and died in Saltwood Castle.

== Early life, military career and cricket ==
Deedes was born at Saltwood in Kent in 1834, the son of William Deedes who became one of the Members of Parliament for East Kent in 1845. His grandfather, also William Deedes had been an MP for Hythe. The family lived at Saltwood Castle and at Sandling Park, both near Hythe in Kent. Deedes was educated at Harrow School between 1847 and 1850. He played cricket in the school XI in his final two years.

After leaving Harrow, Deedes joined the British Army, serving as an officer in the Rifle Brigade. He served during the Crimean War, including at the battles of Alma and Inkerman and at the Siege of Sevastopol, and during the Indian Rebellion of 1857 before retiring with the rank of captain in 1862. He later commanded the East Kent Militia.

Deedes continued to play cricket for Old Harrovians whilst serving in the Army. During the 1853 Canterbury Cricket Week he played in two matches for the Gentlemen of Kent, one against I Zingari and the other, a match now judged to have first-class status, against the Gentlemen of England. Both his father and uncle, John Deedes, also played first-class cricket, sometimes for Kent.

== Politics ==
Deedes was elected to the House of Commons as a Member of Parliament (MP) for East Kent at an unopposed by-election in July 1876, following the resignation of the Conservative MP Sir Wyndham Knatchbull. His father had previously represented the same constituency, from 1845 to 1857 and from 1857 to 1862, but William junior's political career was shorter, as he stood down from Parliament at the 1880 general election.

Parliament of the United Kingdom
Preceded by Sir Wyndham Knatchbull, Bt; Edward Leigh Pemberton	Member of Parliament for East Kent; 1876 – 1880; With: Edward Leigh Pemberton	Succeeded by Aretas Akers-Douglas; Edward Leigh Pemberton
