= William Deedes (East Kent MP, born 1796) =

English cricketer and politician

William Deedes (17 October 1796 – 30 November 1862) was an English cricketer who played from 1817 to 1826, and a Conservative Party politician.

== Cricket ==
Deedes made his debut appearance in 1817 for the Old Wykehamists. Playing no further cricket until 1821, he played for various Marylebone Cricket Club over the next four years.

Deedes made his county cricket debut playing for Hampshire against Sussex and was dismissed by Jem Broadbridge in each innings.

Now 29 years of age, he was to play just two further matches within the following calendar year, his final appearance coming as a tailender in a combined Hampshire and Surrey against Sussex in 1826. He took seven stumpings and two catches in the match. Deedes' brother, John and son William also played.

== Politics ==
Deedes was elected to House of Commons as a Member of Parliament (MP) for East Kent at an unopposed by-election March 1845. He was re-elected unopposed in 1847 in a contested election in 1852 general election, but was defeated at the general election in April 1857. However, Sir Edward Dering, a Liberal who won one of East Kent's two seats in 1852, resigned from the House of Commons on 1 December 1857, and Deedes was elected unopposed at the resulting by-election. He was returned unopposed in 1859, and held the seat until his death in 1862 aged 66.

== Bibliography ==
- Carlaw, Derek (2020). Kent County Cricketers, A to Z: Part One (1806–1914) (PDF). Cardiff: ACS.
- Haygarth, Arthur (1996) [1862]. Scores & Biographies, Volume 1 (1744–1826). Kennington: Frederick Lillywhite. ISBN 978-19-00592-23-9.
- Haygarth, Arthur (1997) [1862]. Scores & Biographies, Volume 2 (1827–1840). Kennington: Frederick Lillywhite. ISBN 978-19-00592-23-9.

Parliament of the United Kingdom
Preceded by Sir Edward Knatchbull; John Pemberton Plumptre	Member of Parliament for East Kent; 1845 – 1857; With: John Pemberton Plumptre 1845–1852; Sir Brook Bridges 1852; Sir Edward Dering 1852–1857	Succeeded by Sir Brook Bridges; Sir Edward Dering
Preceded by Sir Edward Dering; Sir Brook Bridges	Member of Parliament for East Kent; 1857 – 1862; With: Sir Brook Bridges	Succeeded by Sir Edward Dering; Sir Brook Bridges
Church of England titles
Preceded by Spencer Horatio Walpole	Third Church Estates Commissioner; 1858–1862	Succeeded by Spencer Horatio Walpole
