= William Redmond (Irish politician, born 1825) =

Irish politician (1825–1880)

- Born: 1825
- Died: 1880 (aged 54–55)
- Education: Stonyhurst College, Bonn, Trinity College Dublin
- Occupation: politician
- Years active: 1872–1880
- Known for: Home Rule, temperance reformer
- Political party: Home Rule Party
- Spouse: Mary Letitia Louisa Hoey
- Children: John Redmond, Willie Redmond
- Father: Patrick Walter Redmond
- Relatives: John Edward Redmond (uncle), William Archer Redmond (grandson)

William Archer Redmond (1825–1880) sat for Wexford as a member of the Home Rule Party led by Isaac Butt from 1872 to 1880, and was the father of the Irish Parliamentary Party Leader John Redmond.

William Redmond was the son of Patrick Walter Redmond (1803–1869) Esq., J.P., D.L., of Ballytrent House, County Wexford, magistrate, High Sheriff and Deputy Lieutenant of County Wexford, by his wife, Esther Kearney of Rocklands or Rockville, County Wexford. He was the nephew of John Edward Redmond who had sat for the same seat, also as a Liberal M.P., and who is commemorated in Redmond Square in Wexford.

He was educated at Stonyhurst College and Bonn, before graduating from Trinity College Dublin. He was an ardent supporter of Irish Home Rule, and attended the Home Rule Conference of 1873 where he proposed many important resolutions. In his election address in 1872, he said,

Under the name of Home Rule, I will at once declare my conviction that Ireland possesses the indefeasible right to be governed by an Irish Parliament. That right has never been forfeited or surrendered, and I hold that the restoration of Home Rule is absolutely essential to the good government of the country, to the development of its resources, to the removal of the wasting curse of absenteeism and to the final establishment in peace and liberty of the Irish race upon Irish soil, I am convinced that ample means exist to achieve this result within the limits of the Constitution, and without infringing upon our loyalty to the throne, I differ entirely from those who would say that union amongst Irishmen is impossible, and that they do not possess sufficient public virtue to enable them to manage their own affairs

Redmond was also a temperance reformer. He seconded the resolution in favour of the re-enactment and extension of the Sunday Closing Act in Ireland, and was a constant attendant at the meetings in London of the " League of the Cross," a total abstinence organization founded by Cardinal Henry Edward Manning.

Justin McCarthy wrote, 'I can well remember the elder Redmond. He was a man of the most courteous bearing, polished manners, a man, in fact, of education and extraordinary capacity, who, when he spoke in debate, spoke well and very much to the point, and he was highly esteemed by all parties in the House.'

Redmond married Mary Letitia Louisa Hoey, the daughter of General R. H. Hoey, whose brother Francis, was the heir to the Hoey seat, Dunganstown Castle, County Wicklow. He inherited Ballytrent House, near the Tuskar Rock lighthouse, where he lived with his family.

He was the father of John Redmond, leader of the Irish Parliamentary Party, and Willie Redmond. He was the grandfather of the identically named William Archer Redmond who was both an MP and a TD during his political career.

== Sources ==
Terence Denman: A Lonely Grave - the life and death of William Redmond Irish Academic Press 1995
