= List of United Kingdom by-elections (1868–1885) =

This is a list of parliamentary by-elections in the United Kingdom held between 1868 and 1885, indicating the previous incumbent, the victor in the by-election, and their respective parties. Where seats changed political party at the election, the result is highlighted: light blue for a Conservative gain, orange for a Liberal (including Liberal-Labour and Liberal/Crofter) gain, light green for a Home Government Association (1870–1873), Home Rule League (1873–1882) or Irish Parliamentary Party (from 1882) gain and grey for any other gain.

== Resignations ==
Where the cause of by-election is given as "resignation" or "seeks re-election", this indicates that the incumbent was appointed on his own request to an "office of profit under the Crown", either the Steward of the Chiltern Hundreds or the Steward of the Manor of Northstead. These appointments are made as a constitutional device for leaving the House of Commons, whose Members are not permitted to resign.

== Ministerial by-elections ==
The Succession to the Crown Act 1707 required ministers to seek re-election to the House of Commons on their appointment to office. The Re-Election of Ministers Act 1919 ended the necessity to seek re-election within nine months of a general election, and the Re-Election of Ministers Act (1919) Amendment Act 1926 ended the practice in all other cases.

== By-elections ==
=== 22nd Parliament (1880–1885) ===
By-election	Date	Former incumbent	Party	Winner	Party	Cause
Horsham	16 July 1885 (Note: An uncontested by-election.)	Sir Henry Fletcher	Conservative	Sir Henry Fletcher	Conservative	Groom in Waiting (Note: Seat vacated on appointment to the office noted.)
Aylesbury	16 July 1885	Sir Nathan Rothschild	Liberal	Ferdinand James de Rothschild	Liberal	Elevation to a peerage
Chatham	11 July 1885	John Eldon Gorst	Conservative	Sir John Eldon Gorst	Conservative	Solicitor General for England and Wales
North Lincolnshire	10 July 1885	Rowland Winn	Conservative	Henry Atkinson	Conservative	Resignation and Elevation to a peerage
Brighton	10 July 1885	William Thackeray Marriott	Conservative	William Thackeray Marriott	Conservative	Judge Advocate General
County Down	8 July 1885	Lord Arthur Hill	Conservative	Lord Arthur Hill	Conservative	Comptroller of the Household
West Kent	6 July 1885	Viscount Lewisham	Conservative	Viscount Lewisham	Conservative	Vice-Chamberlain of the Household
East Devon	4 July 1885	William Walrond	Conservative	William Walrond	Conservative	Lord Commissioner of the Treasury
Bute	3 July 1885	Charles Dalrymple	Conservative	Charles Dalrymple	Conservative	Lord Commissioner of the Treasury
South Wiltshire	3 July 1885	Viscount Folkestone	Conservative	Viscount Folkestone	Conservative	Treasurer of the Household
Middlesex	3 July 1885	Lord George Hamilton	Conservative	Lord George Hamilton	Conservative	First Lord of the Admiralty
Woodstock	3 July 1885	Lord Randolph Churchill	Conservative	Lord Randolph Churchill	Conservative	Secretary of State for India
North Leicestershire	2 July 1885	Lord John Manners	Conservative	Lord John Manners	Conservative	Postmaster General
North Lancashire	2 July 1885	Frederick Stanley	Conservative	Frederick Stanley	Conservative	Secretary of State for the Colonies
Mid Kent	2 July 1885	Sir William Hart Dyke	Conservative	Sir William Hart Dyke	Conservative	Chief Secretary for Ireland
North Devon	2 July 1885	Sir Stafford Northcote	Conservative	John Moore-Stevens	Conservative	First Lord of the Treasury and elevation to a peerage
Wilton	2 July 1885	Sidney Herbert	Conservative	Sidney Herbert	Conservative	Lord Commissioner of the Treasury
Wakefield	2 July 1885 (Note: Gain retained at the 1885 general election.)	Robert Bownas Mackie	Liberal	Edward Green	Conservative	Death
Dublin University	1 July 1885	David Plunket	Conservative	David Plunket	Conservative	First Commissioner of Works
Dublin University	1 July 1885	Edward Gibson	Conservative	Hugh Holmes	Conservative	Lord Chancellor of Ireland
Mid Lincolnshire	1 July 1885	Henry Chaplin	Conservative	Henry Chaplin	Conservative	Chancellor of the Duchy of Lancaster
Mid Lincolnshire	1 July 1885	Edward Stanhope	Conservative	Edward Stanhope	Conservative	President of the Board of Trade
South West Lancashire	1 July 1885	R. A. Cross	Conservative	R. A. Cross	Conservative	Home Secretary
East Gloucestershire	1 July 1885	Sir Michael Hicks-Beach	Conservative	Sir Michael Hicks-Beach	Conservative	Chancellor of the Exchequer
Launceston	1 July 1885	Sir Hardinge Giffard	Conservative	Richard Everard Webster	Conservative	Appointed Lord Chancellor
Eye	1 July 1885	Ellis Ashmead-Bartlett	Conservative	Ellis Ashmead-Bartlett	Conservative	Civil Lord of the Admiralty
Hertford	30 June 1885	Arthur Balfour	Conservative	Arthur Balfour	Conservative	President of the Local Government Board
Westminster	29 June 1885	William Henry Smith	Conservative	William Henry Smith	Conservative	Secretary of State for War
Denbighshire	27 May 1885	Sir Watkin Williams-Wynn	Conservative	Sir Herbert Williams-Wynn	Conservative	Death
County Antrim	21 May 1885 (Note: Constituency abolished November 1885, so gain was not retained.)	James Chaine	Conservative	William Pirrie Sinclair	Liberal	Death
Glasgow	12 March 1885	George Anderson	Liberal	Thomas Russell	Liberal	Resignation
West Gloucestershire	10 March 1885	Robert Kingscote	Liberal	Benjamin St John Ackers	Conservative	Resignation (Commissioners of Woods, Forests and Land Revenues)
Mid Somerset	4 March 1885	William Gore-Langton	Conservative	John Wingfield Digby	Conservative	Resignation
County Tipperary	12 January 1885	Patrick James Smyth	Irish Parliamentary	John O'Connor	Irish Parliamentary	Resignation (Secretary to the Irish Loan Fund Board)
Knaresborough	9 December 1884	Thomas Collins	Conservative	Robert Gunter	Conservative	Death
County Down	27 November 1884	Viscount Castlereagh	Conservative	Richard Ker	Conservative	Succession to a peerage
Greenock	26 November 1884	James Stewart	Liberal	Thomas Sutherland	Liberal	Resignation
Scarborough	26 November 1884	William Sproston Caine	Liberal	William Sproston Caine	Liberal	Civil Lord of the Admiralty
Hackney	19 November 1884	Henry Fawcett	Liberal	James Stuart	Liberal	Death
South Warwickshire	7 November 1884	Gilbert Leigh	Liberal	Sampson Lloyd	Conservative	Death
Scarborough	3 November 1884	John George Dodson	Liberal	Richard Steble	Liberal	Resignation and Elevation to a peerage
Stirling Burghs	31 October 1884	Henry Campbell-Bannerman	Liberal	Henry Campbell-Bannerman	Liberal	Chief Secretary for Ireland
Radnor Boroughs	30 October 1884	Samuel Williams	Liberal	Charles Rogers	Liberal	Resignation
County Waterford	25 August 1884	John Aloysius Blake	Irish Parliamentary	Patrick Power	Irish Parliamentary	Resignation
Ross and Cromarty	19 August 1884	Sir Alexander Matheson	Liberal	Ronald Munro Ferguson	Liberal	Resignation
South Devon	14 August 1884	John Carpenter Garnier	Conservative	John Tremayne	Conservative	Resignation
North Warwickshire	30 June 1884	William Bromley-Davenport	Conservative	Philip Muntz	Conservative	Death
Leicester	27 June 1884	Peter Alfred Taylor	Liberal	James Allanson Picton	Liberal	Resignation
Mid Surrey	20 June 1884	Sir Henry Peek	Conservative	Sir John Ellis	Conservative	Resignation
South Hampshire	20 June 1884	Lord Henry Scott	Conservative	Sir Frederick Fitzwygram	Conservative	Resignation
Athlone	14 June 1884	Sir John Ennis	Liberal	Justin Huntly McCarthy	Irish Parliamentary	Death
Lincoln	14 June 1884	John Hinde Palmer	Liberal	Joseph Ruston	Liberal	Death
Mid Kent	15 May 1884	Sir Edmund Filmer	Conservative	John Gathorne-Hardy	Conservative	Resignation
Poole	17 April 1884	Charles Schreiber	Conservative	William James Harris	Conservative	Death
Huntingdon	21 March 1884	Viscount Hichingbrooke	Conservative	Sir Robert Peel	Conservative	Succession to a peerage
Cambridgeshire	20 March 1884	Henry Brand	Liberal	Arthur Thornhill	Conservative	Elevation to a peerage
Brighton	1 March 1884	William Thackeray Marriott	Liberal	William Thackeray Marriott	Conservative	Resignation to seek re-election for new party
South Lincolnshire	21 February 1884	Sir William Welby-Gregory	Conservative	Murray Finch-Hatton	Conservative	Resignation
County Meath	23 February 1884	Robert Henry Metge	Irish Parliamentary	William Meagher	Irish Parliamentary	Resignation
Cork City	23 February 1884	John Daly	Irish Parliamentary	John Deasy	Irish Parliamentary	Resignation
West Norfolk	21 February 1884	George Bentinck	Conservative	Clare Sewell Read	Conservative	Resignation
Northampton	19 February 1884	Charles Bradlaugh	Liberal	Charles Bradlaugh	Liberal	Resignation to seek re-election
Paisley	15 February 1884	William Holms	Liberal	Stewart Clark	Liberal	Resignation
West Somerset	15 February 1884	Mordaunt Bisset	Conservative	Charles Isaac Elton	Conservative	Resignation
County Londonderry	12 January 1884	Andrew Porter	Liberal	Samuel Walker	Liberal	Resignation (Master of the Rolls in Ireland)
Wigan	21 December 1883	Thomas Knowles	Conservative	Nathaniel Eckersley	Conservative	Death
Ipswich	12 December 1883	Thomas Cobbold	Conservative	Henry Wyndham West	Liberal	Death
York	22 November 1883 (Note: Gain not retained at the 1885 general election.)	Joseph Johnson Leeman	Liberal	Sir Frederick Milner	Conservative	Death
Limerick City	16 November 1883	Richard O'Shaughnessy	Irish Parliamentary	Edward McMahon	Irish Parliamentary	Resignation (Registrar of Petty Sessions Clerks in Ireland)
Manchester	4 October 1883	Hugh Birley	Conservative	William Houldsworth	Conservative	Death
Rutland	31 August 1883	Gerard Noel	Conservative	James Lowther	Conservative	Resignation
East Essex	25 August 1883	Samuel Ruggles-Brise	Conservative	Charles Hedley Strutt	Conservative	Resignation
Sligo	18 August 1883	Denis Maurice O'Conor	Irish Parliamentary	Nicholas Lynch	Irish Parliamentary	Death
Wexford	17 July 1883	Tim Healy	Irish Parliamentary	Willie Redmond	Irish Parliamentary	Resignation to contest Monaghan
County Monaghan	30 June 1883	John Givan	Liberal	Tim Healy	Irish Parliamentary	Resignation (Crown Solicitor for the counties of Meath and Kildare)
Hastings	29 June 1883	Charles James Murray	Conservative	Henry Bret Ince	Liberal	Resignation
Peterborough	22 June 1883	Hampden Whalley	Liberal	Sir Sydney Buxton	Liberal	Resignation
North Leicestershire	18 June 1883	Edwyn Sherard Burnaby	Conservative	Montagu Curzon	Conservative	Death
County Wexford	15 June 1883	Garrett Byrne	Irish Parliamentary	John Francis Small	Irish Parliamentary	Resignation
Derby	12 June 1883	Michael Thomas Bass	Liberal	Thomas Roe	Liberal	Resignation
Southampton	7 April 1883	Charles Parker Butt	Liberal	Alfred Giles	Conservative	Resignation (Judge of High Court)
County Tipperary	23 March 1883	John Dillon	Irish Parliamentary	Thomas Mayne	Irish Parliamentary	Resignation
Mid Cheshire	14 March 1883	Wilbraham Egerton	Conservative	Alan Egerton	Conservative	Succession to a peerage
Wycombe	10 March 1883	William Carington	Liberal	Gerard Smith	Liberal	Resignation
Portarlington	28 February 1883	Bernard FitzPatrick	Conservative	Robert French-Brewster	Conservative	Succession to a peerage
County Westmeath	27 February 1883	Henry Joseph Gill	Irish Parliamentary	Timothy Harrington	Irish Parliamentary	Resignation
County Dublin	27 February 1883	Thomas Edward Taylor	Conservative	Edward King-Harman	Conservative	Death
Newcastle upon Tyne	24 February 1883	Ashton Wentworth Dilke	Liberal	John Morley	Liberal	Resignation
Haddingtonshire	5 February 1883	Francis, Lord Elcho	Conservative	Hugo, Lord Elcho	Conservative	Succession to a peerage
Mallow	24 January 1883	William Moore Johnson	Liberal	William O'Brien	Irish Parliamentary	Resignation (Judge of High Court in Ireland)
Chelsea	11 January 1883	Sir Charles Dilke	Liberal	Sir Charles Dilke	Liberal	President of the Local Government Board
Liverpool	8 December 1882	Viscount Sandon	Conservative	Samuel Smith	Liberal	Succession to a peerage
Wigan	2 December 1882	Francis Powell	Conservative	Algernon Egerton	Conservative	Void election
Cambridge University	23–28 November 1882	Spencer Horatio Walpole	Conservative	Henry Cecil Raikes	Conservative	Resignation
Preston	23 November 1882	Henry Cecil Raikes	Conservative	William Tomlinson	Conservative	Resignation to contest Cambridge University
Salisbury	20 November 1882	William Grenfell	Liberal	Coleridge Kennard	Conservative	Groom in Waiting
Ennis	14 November 1882	James Lysaght Finegan	Irish Parliamentary	Matthew Joseph Kenny	Irish Parliamentary	Resignation
Edinburgh	3 November 1882	James Cowan	Liberal	Samuel Danks Waddy	Liberal	Resignation
Haddington Burghs	22 August 1882	Sir David Wedderburn	Liberal	Alexander Craig Sellar	Liberal	Resignation
Halifax	21 August 1882	John Dyson Hutchinson	Liberal	Thomas Shaw	Liberal	Resignation
Banffshire	19 June 1882	Robert Duff	Liberal	Robert Duff	Liberal	Lord Commissioner of the Treasury
Hawick Burghs	18 May 1882	George Otto Trevelyan	Liberal	George Otto Trevelyan	Liberal	Chief Secretary for Ireland
Northern West Riding of Yorkshire	18 May 1882	Lord Frederick Cavendish	Liberal	Isaac Holden	Liberal	Chief Secretary for Ireland (Note: Former MP assassinated after the writ was moved.)
West Somerset	26 April 1882	Vaughan Lee	Conservative	Edward James Stanley	Conservative	Resignation
County Meath	17 April 1882	Michael Davitt	Home Rule	Edward Sheil	Home Rule	Disqualification
East Cornwall	31 March 1882	Thomas Agar-Robartes	Liberal	Thomas Dyke Acland	Liberal	Succession to a peerage
Caernarvon Boroughs	28 March 1882	William Bulkeley Hughes	Liberal	Love Jones-Parry	Liberal	Death
Malmesbury	7 March 1882	Walter Powell	Conservative	Charles William Miles	Conservative	Presumed death (Note: Powell was lost riding a balloon that accidentally drifted out to sea from England in December 1881.)
Northampton	2 March 1882	Charles Bradlaugh	Liberal	Charles Bradlaugh	Liberal	Expulsion
County Meath	24 February 1882	Alexander Martin Sullivan	Home Rule	Michael Davitt	Home Rule	Resignation
Taunton	16 February 1882	Sir William Palliser	Conservative	Samuel Allsopp	Conservative	Death
Westminster	10 February 1882	Sir Charles Russell	Conservative	Lord Algernon Percy	Conservative	Resignation
Preston	2 February 1882	Sir John Holker	Conservative	Henry Cecil Raikes	Conservative	Resignation
North Riding of Yorkshire	24 January 1882	Viscount Helmsley	Conservative	Guy Cuthbert Dawnay	Conservative	Death
Carmarthen Boroughs	7 January 1882	Benjamin Thomas Williams	Liberal	John Jones Jenkins	Liberal	Resignation (county court Judge)
County Londonderry	6 December 1881	Hugh Law	Liberal	Andrew Porter	Liberal	Lord Chancellor of Ireland
Stafford	19 November 1881	Alexander Macdonald	Lib-Lab	Thomas Salt	Conservative	Died
Tiverton	14 November 1881	William Nathaniel Massey	Liberal	Viscount Ebrington	Liberal	Died
Berwick-upon-Tweed	26 October 1881	Sir Dudley Marjoribanks	Liberal	Hubert Jerningham	Liberal	Elevation to a peerage
County Tyrone	7 September 1881	Edward Falconer Litton	Liberal	Thomas Alexander Dickson	Liberal	Resignation (Land Commissioner)
Cambridgeshire	7 September 1881	Benjamin Rodwell	Conservative	James Redfoord Bulwer	Conservative	Resignation
North Durham	2 September 1881	John Joicey	Liberal	Sir George Elliot	Conservative	Died
North Lincolnshire	1 September 1881	Robert Laycock	Liberal	James Lowther	Conservative	Died
Elgin Burghs	27 August 1881	Alexander Asher	Liberal	Alexander Asher	Liberal	Solicitor General for Scotland
Edinburgh	24 August 1881	John McLaren	Liberal	Thomas Buchanan	Liberal	Resignation (Judge of the Court of Session)
Leeds	24 August 1881	Herbert Gladstone	Liberal	Herbert Gladstone	Liberal	Lord Commissioner of the Treasury
Elgin Burghs	15 July 1881	M. E. Grant Duff	Liberal	Alexander Asher	Liberal	Resignation (Governor of Madras
Preston	20 May 1881	Edward Hermon	Conservative	William Farrer Ecroyd	Conservative	Death
Knaresborough	12 May 1881	Sir Henry Meysey-Thompson	Liberal	Thomas Collins	Conservative	Void election
West Cheshire	22 April 1881	Sir Philip Grey Egerton	Conservative	Henry James Tollemache	Conservative	Death
Sunderland	12 April 1881	Sir Henry Havelock-Allan	Liberal	Samuel Storey	Liberal	Resignation
St Ives	11 April 1881 (Note: Borough constituency abolished November 1885. Gain not retained, in the county constituency of the same name, at the 1885 general election.)	Sir Charles Reed	Liberal	Charles Campbell Ross	Conservative	Died
Northampton	9 April 1881	Charles Bradlaugh	Liberal	Charles Bradlaugh	Liberal	Voted before taking Oath
Coventry	12 March 1881	Sir Henry Jackson	Liberal	Henry Eaton	Conservative	Resignation
East Cumberland	26 February 1881	Sir Richard Musgrave	Conservative	George Howard	Liberal	Death
South Northamptonshire	15 February 1881	Fairfax Cartwright	Conservative	Pickering Phipps	Conservative	Death
New Ross	31 January 1881	Joseph Foley	Home Rule	John Redmond	Home Rule	Resignation
Edinburgh	27 January 1881	Duncan McLaren	Liberal	John McLaren	Liberal	Resignation
Wigan	18 January 1881 (Note: By-election voided and writ suspended)	Lord Lindsay	Conservative	Francis Powell	Conservative	Succession to a peerage
Kendal	16 December 1880	John Whitwell	Liberal	James Cropper	Liberal	Death
Reading	15 December 1880	George John Shaw-Lefevre	Liberal	George John Shaw-Lefevre	Liberal	First Commissioner of Works and Public Buildings
Clackmannanshire and Kinross-shire	1 December 1880	William Patrick Adam	Liberal	John Balfour	Liberal	Resignation (Governor of Madras)
Renfrewshire	30 November 1880	William Mure	Liberal	Alexander Crum	Liberal	Death
Caernarvonshire	30 November 1880	Charles James Watkin Williams	Liberal	William Rathbone	Liberal	Resignation (Judge of Queen's Bench Division of High Court)
Wexford	26 November 1880	William Archer Redmond	Home Rule	Tim Healy	Home Rule	Death
Liverpool	6 August 1880	Lord Ramsay	Liberal	Lord Claud Hamilton	Conservative	Succession to a peerage
Wigtown Burghs	30 July 1880	Mark John Stewart	Conservative	Sir John Dalrymple-Hay	Conservative	Void election
Scarborough	30 July 1880	Sir Harcourt Johnstone	Liberal	John George Dodson	Liberal	Resignation
Berwick-upon-Tweed	19 July 1880	Henry Strutt	Liberal	David Milne Home	Conservative	Succession to a peerage
Lichfield	15 July 1880	Richard Dyott	Conservative	Theophilus John Levett	Conservative	Void election
Bewdley	12 July 1880	Charles Harrison	Liberal	Enoch Baldwin	Liberal	Void election
Tewkesbury	9 July 1880	William Edwin Price	Liberal	Richard Martin	Liberal	Void election
Plymouth	8 July 1880	Edward Bates	Conservative	Edward Clarke	Conservative	Void election
Evesham	8 July 1880 (Note: Borough constituency abolished November 1885. Gain retained, in the county constituency of the same name, at the 1885 general election.)	Daniel Rowlinson Ratcliff	Liberal	Frederick Lehmann	Liberal	Void election
Evesham	8 July 1880	Daniel Rowlinson Ratcliff	Liberal	Frederick Dixon-Hartland	Conservative	By-election result reversed on petition (1881)
Bute	3 July 1880	Thomas Russell	Liberal	Charles Dalrymple	Conservative	Void election
Gravesend	1 July 1880	Thomas Bevan	Liberal	Sir Sydney Waterlow	Liberal	Void election
Wallingford	30 June 1880	Walter Wren	Liberal	Pandeli Ralli	Liberal	Void election
Bandon	25 June 1880	Percy Bernard	Conservative	Richard Lane Allman	Liberal	Resignation in exchange for withdrawal of election petition
Dungannon	25 June 1880	Thomas Alexander Dickson	Liberal	James Dickson	Liberal	Void election
London University	3 June 1880	Robert Lowe	Liberal	Sir John Lubbock	Liberal	Elevation to the peerage
County Mayo	31 May 1880	Charles Stewart Parnell	Home Rule	Isaac Nelson	Home Rule	Sat for Cork
County Louth	31 May 1880	Alexander Martin Sullivan	Home Rule	Henry Bellingham	Home Rule	Resignation to contest County Meath
Derby	26 May 1880	Samuel Plimsoll	Liberal	William Vernon Harcourt	Liberal	Resignation
Wycombe	26 May 1880	William Carington	Liberal	William Carington	Liberal	Groom in Waiting
County Meath	22 May 1880	Charles Stewart Parnell	Home Rule	Alexander Martin Sullivan	Home Rule	Sat for Cork
County Londonderry	21 May 1880	Hugh Law	Liberal	Hugh Law	Liberal	Attorney General for Ireland
Sandwich	18 May 1880 (Note: By-election voided and writ suspended. Constituency abolished in June 1885)	Edward Knatchbull-Hugessen	Liberal	Charles Henry Crompton-Roberts	Conservative	Resignation and Elevation to the peerage
Wigtown Burghs	18 May 1880	John McLaren	Liberal	Mark John Stewart	Conservative	Lord Advocate
Mallow	17 May 1880	William Moore Johnson	Liberal	William Moore Johnson	Liberal	Solicitor General for Ireland
North East Lancashire	17 May 1880	Marquess of Hartington	Liberal	Marquess of Hartington	Liberal	Secretary of State for India
Clackmannanshire and Kinross-shire	14 May 1880	William Patrick Adam	Liberal	William Patrick Adam	Liberal	First Commissioner of Works
Denbighshire	14 May 1880	George Osborne Morgan	Liberal	George Osborne Morgan	Liberal	Judge Advocate General
Radnor Boroughs	14 May 1880	Marquess of Hartington	Liberal	Samuel Williams	Liberal	Double Election, Sat for North East Lancashire
Haverfordwest Boroughs	12 May 1880	Lord Kensington	Liberal	Lord Kensington	Liberal	Comptroller of the Household
Midlothian	10 May 1880	William Ewart Gladstone	Liberal	William Ewart Gladstone	Liberal	Prime Minister, First Lord of the Treasury and Chancellor of the Exchequer
Shrewsbury	10 May 1880	Charles Cecil Cotes	Liberal	Charles Cecil Cotes	Liberal	Lord Commissioner of the Treasury
Leeds	10 May 1880	William Ewart Gladstone	Liberal	Herbert Gladstone	Liberal	Double Election, Sat for Midlothian
Hastings	10 May 1880	Thomas Brassey	Liberal	Thomas Brassey	Liberal	Civil Lord of the Admiralty
Durham City	10 May 1880	Farrer Herschell	Liberal	Farrer Herschell	Liberal	Solicitor General for England and Wales
Taunton	8 May 1880	Sir Henry James	Liberal	Sir Henry James	Liberal	Attorney General for England and Wales
Sheffield	8 May 1880	A. J. Mundella	Liberal	A. J. Mundella	Liberal	Vice-President of the Committee of the Council on Education
Pontefract	8 May 1880	Hugh Childers	Liberal	Hugh Childers	Liberal	Secretary of State for War
Oxford	8 May 1880	William Harcourt	Liberal	Alexander William Hall	Conservative	Home Secretary
Nottingham	8 May 1880	John Skirrow Wright	Liberal	Arnold Morley	Liberal	Death
Marlborough	8 May 1880	Lord Charles Bruce	Liberal	Lord Charles Bruce	Liberal	Vice-Chamberlain of the Household
Kidderminster	8 May 1880	John Brinton	Liberal	John Brinton	Liberal	Sought re-election to preempt election petition
Chester	8 May 1880	John George Dodson	Liberal	John George Dodson	Liberal	President of the Local Government Board
Bradford	8 May 1880	William Edward Forster	Liberal	William Edward Forster	Liberal	Chief Secretary for Ireland
Birmingham	8 May 1880	John Bright	Liberal	John Bright	Liberal	Chancellor of the Duchy of Lancaster
Birmingham	8 May 1880	Joseph Chamberlain	Liberal	Joseph Chamberlain	Liberal	President of the Board of Trade
Bath	8 May 1880	Sir Arthur Divett Hayter	Liberal	Sir Arthur Divett Hayter	Liberal	Lord Commissioner of the Treasury
Hackney	7 May 1880	Henry Fawcett	Liberal	Henry Fawcett	Liberal	Postmaster General
Hackney	7 May 1880	John Holms	Liberal	John Holms	Liberal	Lord Commissioner of the Treasury
=== 21st Parliament (1874–1880) ===
By-election	Date	Former Incumbent	Party	Winner	Party	Cause
West Norfolk	8 March 1880 (Note: An uncontested by-election.)	Sir William Bagge	Conservative	William Tyssen-Amherst	Conservative	Death
Drogheda	2 March 1880	William Hagarty O'Leary	Home Rule	Benjamin Whitworth	Home Rule	Death
Kilkenny City	27 February 1880	Benjamin Whitworth	Home Rule	John Francis Smithwick	Home Rule	Resigned to contest Drogheda
Southwark	13 February 1880 (Note: Gain not retained at the 1880 general election)	John Locke	Liberal	Edward Clarke	Conservative	Death
Barnstaple	12 February 1880	Samuel Danks Waddy	Liberal	Viscount Lymington	Liberal	Resigned to contest Sheffield
Liverpool	6 February 1880	John Torr	Conservative	Edward Whitley	Conservative	Death
Sheffield	22 December 1879	John Arthur Roebuck	Liberal	Samuel Danks Waddy	Liberal	Death
County Donegal	15 December 1879 (Note: Gain retained at the 1880 general election)	William Wilson	Conservative	Thomas Lea	Liberal	Death
Elginshire and Nairnshire	17 September 1879	Viscount Macduff	Liberal	Sir George Macpherson-Grant	Liberal	Succession to a peerage
Ennis	26 July 1879	William Stacpoole	Home Rule	James Lysaght Finegan	Home Rule	Death
Glasgow	16 July 1879	Alexander Whitelaw	Conservative	Charles Tennant	Liberal	Death
Limerick City	23 May 1879	Isaac Butt	Home Rule	Daniel Fitzgerald Gabbett	Home Rule	Death
County Clare	15 May 1879	Bryan O'Loghlen	Home Rule	James Patrick Mahon	Home Rule	Resignation (Attorney General of the Colony of Victoria)
Canterbury	8 May 1879	Lewis Majendie	Conservative	Robert Peter Laurie	Conservative	Resignation
East Cumberland	25 April 1879	Charles Howard	Liberal	George Howard	Liberal	Death
Cockermouth	16 April 1879	Isaac Fletcher	Liberal	William Fletcher	Liberal	Death
County Longford	5 April 1879	Myles O'Reilly	Home Rule	Justin McCarthy	Home Rule	Resignation (Assistant Commissioner of Intermediate Education in Ireland)
East Somerset	19 March 1879	Ralph Shuttleworth Allen	Conservative	Lord Brooke	Conservative	Resignation
Haddington Burghs	25 February 1879	Lord William Hay	Liberal	Sir David Wedderburn	Liberal	Succession to a peerage
South Warwickshire	21 February 1879	Earl of Yarmouth	Conservative	Earl of Yarmouth	Conservative	Comptroller of the Household (Note: Seat vacated on appointment to the office noted.)
County Cork	17 February 1879	McCarthy Downing	Home Rule	David la Touche Colthurst	Home Rule	Death
Cambridgeshire	30 January 1879	Elliot Yorke	Conservative	Edward Hicks	Conservative	Death
North Norfolk	21 January 1879	James Duff	Conservative	Edward Birkbeck	Conservative	Death
County Londonderry	18 December 1878	Richard Smyth	Liberal	Sir Thomas McClure	Liberal	Death
New Ross	17 December 1878	John Dunbar	Home Rule	Charles George Tottenham	Conservative	Death
Bristol	14 December 1878	Kirkman Daniel Hodgson	Liberal	Lewis Fry	Liberal	Resignation
Maldon	11 December 1878	George Sandford	Conservative	George Courtauld	Liberal	Resignation
Peterborough	29 October 1878	George Hammond Whalley	Liberal	John Wentworth-FitzWilliam	Independent Liberal	Death
Truro	26 September 1878	Sir Frederick Williams	Conservative	Arthur Tremayne	Conservative	Death
Argyllshire	27 August 1878	Marquess of Lorne	Liberal	Lord Colin Campbell	Liberal	Resignation
Newcastle-under-Lyme	23 August 1878	Sir Edmund Buckley	Conservative	Samuel Rathbone Edge	Liberal	Resignation
Boston	12 August 1878	John Malcolm	Conservative	Thomas Garfit	Conservative	Resigned to contest Argyllshire
Haddington Burghs	3 August 1878	Sir Henry Ferguson Davie	Liberal	Lord William Hay	Liberal	Resignation
Flint Boroughs	5 July 1878	Peter Ellis Eyton	Liberal	John Roberts	Liberal	Death
Middlesbrough	4 July 1878	Henry Bolckow	Liberal	Isaac Wilson	Liberal	Death
Rochester	14 June 1878	Philip Wykeham Martin	Liberal	Arthur Otway	Liberal	Death
Southampton	14 June 1878	Russell Gurney	Conservative	Alfred Giles	Conservative	Death
County Down	17 May 1878	James Sharman Crawford	Liberal	Viscount Castlereagh	Conservative	Death
Reading	17 May 1878	Sir Francis Goldsmid	Liberal	George Palmer	Liberal	Death
West Kent	15 May 1878	John Gilbert Talbot	Conservative	Viscount Lewisham	Conservative	Resigned to contest Oxford University
Oxford University	13–17 May 1878	Gathorne Hardy	Conservative	John Gilbert Talbot	Conservative	Elevation to the peerage
Carmarthen Boroughs	11 May 1878	Sir Arthur Cowell-Stepney	Liberal	Benjamin Thomas Williams	Liberal	Resignation
North Staffordshire	24 April 1878	Charles Adderley	Conservative	Robert William Hanbury	Conservative	Elevation to the peerage
Tamworth	24 April 1878	Robert William Hanbury	Conservative	Hamar Bass	Liberal	Resigned to contest North Staffordshire
South Northumberland	17 April 1878 (Note: Double Return. Two candidates declared elected due to a tie. On recount Ridley was elected. Grey would gain the seat in the 1880 general election.)	Lord Eslington	Conservative	Edward Ridley	Conservative	Succession to a peerage
South Northumberland	17 April 1878	Lord Eslington	Conservative	Albert Grey	Liberal	Succession to a peerage
Middlesex	12 April 1878	Lord George Hamilton	Conservative	Lord George Hamilton	Conservative	Vice-President of the Committee of the Council on Education
North Lancashire	8 April 1878	Frederick Stanley	Conservative	Frederick Stanley	Conservative	Secretary of State for War
Belfast	2 April 1878	William Johnston	Conservative	William Ewart	Conservative	Resignation (Inspector of Fisheries in Ireland)
Worcester	28 March 1878	Alexander Clunes Sheriff	Liberal	John Derby Allcroft	Conservative	Death
East Somerset	20 March 1878	Richard Bright	Conservative	Sir Philip Miles	Conservative	D eath
Mid Somerset	19 March 1878	Ralph Neville-Grenville	Conservative	William Gore-Langton	Conservative	Resignation
Hereford	14 March 1878	Evan Pateshall	Conservative	George Arbuthnot	Conservative	Resignation
Cirencester	12 March 1878	Allen Bathurst	Conservative	Thomas Chester-Master	Conservative	Succession to a peerage
Canterbury	2 March 1878	Henry Munro-Butler-Johnstone	Conservative	Alfred Gathorne-Hardy	Conservative	Resignation
York	20 February 1878	James Lowther	Conservative	James Lowther	Conservative	Chief Secretary for Ireland
Oxfordshire	5 February 1878	J. W. Henley	Conservative	Edward William Harcourt	Conservative	Resignation
Perthshire	2 February 1878	Sir William Stirling-Maxwell	Conservative	Henry Home-Drummond-Moray	Conservative	Death
Marlborough	31 January 1878	Lord Ernest Brudenell-Bruce	Liberal	Lord Charles Bruce	Liberal	Succession as Marquess of Ailesbury
Perth	29 January 1878	Arthur Kinnaird	Liberal	Charles Stuart Parker	Liberal	Succession as Lord Kinnaird
Leith Burghs	29 January 1878	Donald Robert Macgregor	Liberal	Andrew Grant	Liberal	Resignation
Greenock	25 January 1878	James Grieve	Liberal	James Stewart	Liberal	Resignation
County Clare	13 August 1877	Sir Colman O'Loghlen	Home Rule	Sir Bryan O'Loghlen	Home Rule	Death
North Northamptonshire	13 August 1877	George Ward Hunt	Conservative	Sackville Stopford-Sackville	Conservative	Death
Westminster	11 August 1877	William Henry Smith	Conservative	William Henry Smith	Conservative	First Lord of the Admiralty
South Shropshire	10 August 1877	Edward Corbett	Conservative	Sir Baldwyn Leighton	Conservative	Resignation
Great Grimsby	1 August 1877	John Chapman	Conservative	Alfred Watkin	Liberal	Death
Huntingdonshire	29 June 1877	Henry Carstairs Pelly	Conservative	Viscount Mandeville	Conservative	Death
Dungarvan	23 June 1877	John O'Keeffe	Home Rule	Frank Hugh O'Donnell	Home Rule	Death
County Tipperary	15 May 1877	William Frederick Ormonde O'Callaghan	Home Rule	Edmund Dwyer Gray	Home Rule	Death
Montgomery Boroughs	15 May 1877	Hon. Charles Hanbury-Tracy	Liberal	Hon. Frederick Hanbury-Tracy	Liberal	Succession as Baron Sudeley
Salford	19 April 1877	Charles Edward Cawley	Conservative	Oliver Ormerod Walker	Conservative	Death
Launceston	3 March 1877	James Henry Deakin	Conservative	Sir Hardinge Giffard	Conservative	Resignation
Oldham	1 March 1877	John Morgan Cobbett	Conservative	John Tomlinson Hibbert	Liberal	Death
Halifax	20 February 1877	John Crossley	Liberal	John Dyson Hutchinson	Liberal	Resignation
Wilton	19 February 1877	Sir Edmund Antrobus	Liberal	Hon. Sidney Herbert	Conservative	Resignation
Dublin University	13 February 1877	Edward Gibson	Conservative	Edward Gibson	Conservative	Attorney-General for Ireland
County Waterford	20 January 1877	Sir John Esmonde	Home Rule	James Delahunty	Home Rule	Death
County Sligo	12 January 1877	Sir Robert Gore-Booth	Conservative	Edward King-Harman	Conservative	Death
Liskeard	22 December 1876	Edward Horsman	Liberal	Leonard Courtney	Liberal	Death
Frome	23 November 1876	Henry Lopes	Conservative	Henry Samuelson	Liberal	Resignation (Judge of the High Court of Justice)
Glasgow and Aberdeen Universities	6–10 November 1876	Edward Gordon	Conservative	William Watson	Conservative	Resignation (Lords of Appeal in Ordinary)
South Shropshire	3 November 1876	Percy Egerton Herbert	Conservative	John Edmund Severne	Conservative	Death
Buckinghamshire	21 September 1876	Benjamin Disraeli	Conservative	Thomas Fremantle	Conservative	Elevation to the peerage
County Donegal	26 August 1876	Thomas Conolly	Conservative	William Wilson	Conservative	Death
Rutlandshire	17 August 1876	Gerard Noel	Conservative	Gerard Noel	Conservative	First Commissioner of Works
Leeds	15 August 1876	Robert Meek Carter	Liberal	John Barran	Liberal	Resignation
Carmarthen Boroughs	14 August 1876	Charles William Nevill	Conservative	Arthur Cowell-Stepney	Liberal	Resignation
New Shoreham	4 August 1876	Percy Burrell	Conservative	Walter Burrell	Conservative	Death
East Kent	26 July 1876	Wyndham Knatchbull	Conservative	William Deedes	Conservative	Resignation
Mid Cheshire	18 July 1876	Egerton Leigh	Conservative	Piers Egerton-Warburton	Conservative	Death
County Leitrim	14 July 1876	William Ormsby-Gore	Conservative	Francis O'Beirne	Home Rule	Succession to a peerage
West Worcestershire	8 July 1876	William Dowdeswell	Conservative	Sir Edmund Lechmere	Conservative	Resignation
Birmingham	27 June 1876	George Dixon	Liberal	Joseph Chamberlain	Liberal	Resignation
Pembrokeshire	26 June 1876	John Scourfield	Conservative	James Bevan Bowen	Conservative	Death
Cork City	25 May 1876	Joseph Philip Ronayne	Home Rule	William Goulding	Conservative	Death
West Aberdeenshire	10 May 1876	William McCombie	Liberal	Lord Douglas Gordon	Liberal	Resignation
East Cumberland	26 April 1876	William Nicholson Hodgson	Conservative	Stafford Howard	Liberal	Death
North Norfolk	21 April 1876	Frederick Walpole	Conservative	James Duff	Conservative	Death
Horsham	29 February 1876	Robert Henry Hurst	Liberal	James Clifton Brown	Liberal	Void election
East Retford	24 February 1876	Viscount Galway	Conservative	William Beckett-Denison	Conservative	Death
Berkshire	23 February 1876	Richard Fellowes Benyon	Conservative	Philip Wroughton	Conservative	Resignation
East Suffolk	22 February 1876	Viscount Mahon	Conservative	Frederick Barne	Conservative	Succession to a peerage
Manchester	17 February 1876	William Romaine Callender	Conservative	Jacob Bright	Liberal	Death
Huntingdon	16 February 1876	John Burgess Karslake	Conservative	Viscount Hinchingbrooke	Conservative	Resignation
Leominster	15 February 1876	Richard Arkwright	Conservative	Thomas Blake	Liberal	Resignation
Enniskillen	15 February 1876	Viscount Crichton	Conservative	Viscount Crichton	Conservative	Lord Commissioner of the Treasury
Burnley	12 February 1876	Richard Shaw	Liberal	Peter Rylands	Liberal	Death
North Shropshire	3 February 1876	John Ormsby-Gore	Conservative	Stanley Leighton	Conservative	Elevation to the peerage
Dorset	3 February 1876	Henry Sturt	Conservative	Edward Digby	Conservative	Elevation to the peerage
South Wiltshire	4 January 1876	Lord Henry Thynne	Conservative	Lord Henry Thynne	Conservative	Treasurer of the Household
Ipswich	1 January 1876	John Cobbold	Conservative	Thomas Cobbold	Conservative	Death
East Aberdeenshire	22 December 1875	William Dingwall Fordyce	Liberal	Alexander Hamilton-Gordon	Liberal	Death
Horsham	17 December 1875	Seymour Vesey-FitzGerald	Conservative	Robert Henry Hurst	Liberal	Resignation (Chief Charity Commissioner for England and Wales)
Whitehaven	16 December 1875	George Cavendish-Bentinck	Conservative	George Cavendish-Bentinck	Conservative	Judge Advocate General
Mid Surrey	24 November 1875	Richard Baggallay	Conservative	Sir Trevor Lawrence	Conservative	Resignation (Justice of the Court of Appeal)
South West Lancashire	6 November 1875	Charles Turner	Conservative	John Ireland Blackburne	Conservative	Death
Armagh City	18 October 1875	John Vance	Conservative	George Beresford	Conservative	Death
West Suffolk	4 October 1875	Fuller Maitland Wilson	Conservative	Thomas Thornhill	Conservative	Death
Blackburn	30 September 1875	Henry Master Feilden	Conservative	Daniel Thwaites	Conservative	Death
Hartlepool	29 July 1875	Thomas Richardson	Liberal	Lowthian Bell	Liberal	Resignation
West Suffolk	16 June 1875	Lord Augustus Hervey	Conservative	Fuller Maitland Wilson	Conservative	Death
Breconshire	20 May 1875	Godfrey Morgan	Conservative	William Fuller-Maitland	Liberal	Succession to a peerage
Kilkenny City	28 April 1875	John Gray	Home Rule	Benjamin Whitworth	Home Rule	Death
Bedfordshire	28 April 1875	Francis Bassett	Liberal	Marquess of Tavistock	Liberal	Resignation
Kirkcaldy Burghs	20 April 1875	Robert Reid	Liberal	George Campbell	Liberal	Death
Meath	17 April 1875	John Martin	Home Rule	Charles Stewart Parnell	Home Rule	Death
Bridport	31 March 1875	Thomas Alexander Mitchell	Liberal	Pandeli Ralli	Liberal	Death
County Tipperary	11 March 1875	John Mitchel	Ind. Nationalist	John Mitchel	Ind. Nationalist	Disqualification (Convicted Felon)
County Tipperary	11 March 1875	John Mitchel	Ind. Nationalist	Stephen Moore	Conservative	By-election result reversed on petition
St Ives	5 March 1875	Charles Tyringham Praed	Conservative	Charles Tyringham Praed	Conservative	Void election
Norwich	5 March 1875 (Note: By-Election voided and writ suspended. Seat was vacant until the 1880 general election where Tillett was elected.)	John Walter Huddleston	Conservative	Jacob Henry Tillett	Liberal	Resignation (Justice of the Court of Common Pleas)
Stroud	19 February 1875	Henry Brand	Liberal	Samuel Marling	Liberal	Void election
Stoke-upon-Trent	16 February 1875	George Milles	Liberal	Edward Vaughan Hyde Kenealy	Independent	Resignation
County Tipperary	13 February 1875 (Note: Mitchell was disqualified for being a convicted felon and was re-elected at the ensuing by-election. He died before his re-election was adjudged to a Conservative who would be defeated in the 1880 general election.)	Charles William White	Home Rule	John Mitchel	Ind. Nationalist	Resignation
Chatham	13 February 1875	George Elliot	Conservative	John Eldon Gorst	Conservative	Resignation
Dublin University	11 February 1875	David Plunket	Conservative	David Plunket	Conservative	Solicitor General for Ireland
East Kent	27 January 1875	George Milles	Conservative	Wyndham Knatchbull	Conservative	Succession to a peerage
Dublin University	18–22 January 1875	John Thomas Ball	Conservative	Edward Gibson	Conservative	Resignation (Lord Chancellor of Ireland)
St Ives	28 December 1874	Edward Davenport	Conservative	Charles Praed	Conservative	Death
Birkenhead	24 November 1874	John Laird	Conservative	David MacIver	Conservative	Death
Wenlock	12 November 1874	George Weld-Forester	Conservative	Cecil Weld-Forester	Conservative	Succession to a peerage
Northampton	6 October 1874	Charles Gilpin	Liberal	Charles Merewether	Conservative	Death
Cambridgeshire	5 October 1874	Lord George Manners	Conservative	Benjamin Rodwell	Conservative	Death
Midhurst	23 September 1874	Charles Perceval	Conservative	Sir Henry Holland	Conservative	Succession to a peerage
Kidderminster	31 July 1874	Albert Grant	Conservative	Sir William Fraser	Conservative	Void Election
Stroud	24 July 1874	John Dorington	Conservative	Henry Brand	Liberal	Void Election
Launceston	3 July 1874	James Henry Deakin (senior)	Conservative	James Henry Deakin (junior)	Conservative	Void Election
Galway	29 June 1874	Frank Hugh O'Donnell	Home Rule	Michael Francis Ward	Home Rule	Void Election
North Durham	19 June 1874	Charles Palmer	Liberal	Charles Palmer	Liberal	Void Election
North Durham	19 June 1874	Lowthian Bell	Liberal	Sir George Elliot	Conservative	Void Election
Wigtown Burghs	12 June 1874	George Young	Liberal	Mark John Stewart	Conservative	Resignation (Judge of the Court of Session)
Haverfordwest	12 June 1874	Lord Kensington	Liberal	Lord Kensington	Liberal	Void Election
City of Durham	11 June 1874	Thomas Charles Thompson	Liberal	Farrer Herschell	Liberal	Void Election
City of Durham	11 June 1874	John Henderson	Liberal	Sir Arthur Middleton	Liberal	Void Election
County Mayo	29 May 1874	George Eakins Browne	Home Rule	George Eakins Browne	Home Rule	Void Election
County Mayo	29 May 1874	Thomas Tighe	Home Rule	John O'Connor Power	Home Rule	Void Election
Poole	26 May 1874	Charles Waring	Liberal	Evelyn Ashley	Liberal	Void Election
Dudley	18 May 1874	Henry Brinsley Sheridan	Liberal	Henry Brinsley Sheridan	Liberal	Void Election
Stroud	15 May 1874 (Note: Dorington's election was voided on petition and the subsequent by-election was won by the Liberals who held it in the 1880 general election.)	Sebastian Dickinson	Liberal	Alfred Stanton	Liberal	Void Election
Stroud	15 May 1874	Walter John Stanton	Liberal	John Edward Dorington	Conservative	Void Election
Wakefield	4 May 1874	Edward Green	Conservative	Thomas Kemp Sanderson	Conservative	Void Election
Preston	24 April 1874	John Holker	Conservative	John Holker	Conservative	Solicitor General for England and Wales
Hackney	24 April 1874	John Holms	Liberal	John Holms	Liberal	Void Election
Hackney	24 April 1874	Charles Reed	Liberal	Henry Fawcett	Liberal	Void Election
Louth	8 April 1874	Philip Callan	Home Rule	George Kirk	Home Rule	Double Election, Sat for Dundalk
North Lancashire	26 March 1874	John Wilson-Patten	Conservative	Thomas Henry Clifton	Conservative	Elevation to the peerage
Falkirk Burghs	26 March 1874	John Ramsay	Liberal	John Ramsay	Liberal	Disqualification (held Government Contract)
North Staffordshire	23 March 1874	Charles Adderley	Conservative	Charles Adderley	Conservative	President of the Board of Trade
Galway	20 March 1874	Viscount St Lawrence	Home Rule	Frank Hugh O'Donnell	Home Rule	Succession to a peerage
East Suffolk	20 March 1874	Lord Rendlesham	Conservative	Lord Rendlesham	Conservative	Lord Commissioner of the Treasury
North Leicestershire	20 March 1874	Lord John Manners	Conservative	Lord John Manners	Conservative	Postmaster General
Invernesshire	19 March 1874	Donald Cameron	Conservative	Donald Cameron	Conservative	Parliamentary Groom in Waiting
South West Lancashire	19 March 1874	R. A. Cross	Conservative	R. A. Cross	Conservative	Home Secretary
South Devonshire	19 March 1874	Sir Massey Lopes	Conservative	Sir Massey Lopes	Conservative	Civil Lord of the Admiralty
County Dublin	18 March 1874	Thomas Edward Taylor	Conservative	Thomas Edward Taylor	Conservative	Chancellor of the Duchy of Lancaster
North Devonshire	18 March 1874	Sir Stafford Northcote	Conservative	Sir Stafford Northcote	Conservative	Chancellor of the Exchequer
North Northamptonshire	18 March 1874	George Ward Hunt	Conservative	George Ward Hunt	Conservative	First Lord of the Admiralty
North Northumberland	17 March 1874	Earl Percy	Conservative	Earl Percy	Conservative	Treasurer of the Household
Monmouthshire	17 March 1874	Lord Henry Somerset	Conservative	Lord Henry Somerset	Conservative	Comptroller of the Household
East Gloucestershire	17 March 1874	Michael Hicks Beach	Conservative	Michael Hicks Beach	Conservative	Chief Secretary for Ireland
Buckinghamshire	17 March 1874	Benjamin Disraeli	Conservative	Benjamin Disraeli	Conservative	Prime Minister and First Lord of the Treasury
Eye	17 March 1874	Viscount Barrington	Conservative	Viscount Barrington	Conservative	Vice-Chamberlain of the Household
Dublin University	16 March 1874	John Thomas Ball	Conservative	John Thomas Ball	Conservative	Attorney General for Ireland
Mid Surrey	16 March 1874	Richard Baggallay	Conservative	Richard Baggallay	Conservative	Solicitor General for England and Wales
Portsmouth	16 March 1874	James Dalrymple-Horn-Elphinstone	Conservative	James Dalrymple-Horn-Elphinstone	Conservative	Lord Commissioner of the Treasury
North Lincolnshire	16 March 1874	Rowland Winn	Conservative	Rowland Winn	Conservative	Lord Commissioner of the Treasury
Oxford	16 March 1874	Edward Cardwell	Liberal	Alexander William Hall	Conservative	Elevated as Viscount Cardwell
Huntingdon	16 March 1874	John Burgess Karslake	Conservative	John Burgess Karslake	Conservative	Attorney General for England and Wales
Glasgow and Aberdeen Universities	14 March 1874	Edward Strathearn Gordon	Conservative	Edward Strathearn Gordon	Conservative	Lord Advocate
North Hampshire	14 March 1874	George Sclater-Booth	Conservative	George Sclater-Booth	Conservative	President of the Local Government Board
Liverpool	14 March 1874	Viscount Sandon	Conservative	Viscount Sandon	Conservative	Vice-President of the Committee of the Council on Education
Oxford University	14 March 1874	Gathorne Hardy	Conservative	Gathorne Hardy	Conservative	Secretary of State for War
New Shoreham	13 March 1874	Stephen Cave	Conservative	Stephen Cave	Conservative	Judge Advocate General
Chicester	13 March 1874	Lord Henry Lennox	Conservative	Lord Henry Lennox	Conservative	First Commissioner of Works
=== 20th Parliament (1868–1874) ===
By-election	Date	Former Incumbent	Party	Winner	Party	Cause
Newcastle-upon-Tyne	14 January 1874	Joseph Cowen	Liberal	Joseph Cowen	Liberal	Death
West Somerset	12 January 1874 (Note: An uncontested by-election.)	William Gore-Langton	Conservative	Vaughan Lee	Conservative	Death
Stroud	6 January 1874 (Note: Gain not retained at the 1874 general election)	Henry Winterbotham	Liberal	John Edward Dorington	Conservative	Death
Cambridgeshire	3 January 1874	Viscount Royston	Conservative	Elliot Yorke	Conservative	Succession to a peerage
Huntington	17 December 1873	Thomas Baring	Conservative	John Burgess Karslake	Conservative	Death
Exeter	9 December 1873 (Note: Gain retained at the 1874 general election.)	John Coleridge	Liberal	Arthur Mills	Conservative	Resignation (Chief Justice of the Common Pleas)
Oxford	6 December 1873	William Harcourt	Liberal	William Harcourt	Liberal	Solicitor General for England and Wales (Note: Seat vacated on appointment to the office noted.)
Edinburgh and St Andrews Universities	4 December 1873	Lyon Playfair	Liberal	Lyon Playfair	Liberal	Postmaster General
Haverfordwest Boroughs	24 November 1873	Lord Kensington	Liberal	Lord Kensington	Liberal	Parliamentary Groom in Waiting
Kingston-upon-Hull	22 October 1873	James Clay	Liberal	Joseph Walker Pease	Conservative	Death
Birmingham	20 October 1873	John Bright	Liberal	John Bright	Liberal	Chancellor of the Duchy of Lancaster
Taunton	13 October 1873	Henry James	Liberal	Henry James	Liberal	Solicitor General for England and Wales
Bath	8 October 1873	Donald Dalrymple	Liberal	Arthur Hayter	Liberal	Death
Dover	22 September 1873	Sir George Jessel	Liberal	Edward William Barnett	Conservative	Resignation (Master of the Rolls)
Renfrewshire	10 September 1873	Henry Bruce	Liberal	Archibald Campbell	Conservative	Elevation to a peerage
Shaftsbury	30 August 1873	George Glyn	Liberal	Vere Fane Benett-Stanford	Conservative	Succession to a peerage
Northern West Riding of Yorkshire	27 August 1873	Lord Frederick Cavendish	Liberal	Lord Frederick Cavendish	Liberal	Lord Commissioner of the Treasury
East Staffordshire	6 August 1873	John Robinson McClean	Liberal	Samuel Allsopp	Conservative	Death
Dundee	5 August 1873	George Armitstead	Liberal	James Yeaman	Liberal	Resignation
Greenwich	2 August 1873	David Salomons	Liberal	Thomas Boord	Conservative	Death
County Waterford	5 July 1873	Edmond de la Poer	Liberal	Henry Villiers-Stuart	Liberal	Resignation
Berwickshire	27 June 1873	David Robertson	Liberal	William Miller	Liberal	Elevation to the peerage
Bath	27 June 1873	Viscount Chelsea	Conservative	Viscount Grey de Wilton	Conservative	Succession to a peerage
County Roscommon	24 June 1873	Fitzstephen French	Liberal	Charles French	Liberal	Death
Southern Devonshire	17 June 1873	Samuel Trehawke Kekewich	Conservative	John Carpenter Garnier	Conservative	Death
Richmonds (Yorks)	27 May 1873	Lawrence Dundas	Liberal	John Dundas	Liberal	Succession to a peerage
Gloucester	8 May 1873	William Philip Price	Liberal	William Killigrew Wait	Conservative	Resignation
Bath	6 May 1873	Sir William Tite	Liberal	Viscount Chelsea	Conservative	Death
County Tyrone	7 April 1873	Henry Lowry-Corry	Conservative	Henry Lowry-Corry	Conservative	Death
Cheshire Mid	7 March 1873	George Legh	Conservative	Egerton Leigh	Conservative	Resignation
Wigtownshire	21 February 1873	Lord Garlies	Conservative	Robert Vans-Agnew	Conservative	Succession to a peerage
Lisburn	19 February 1873	Edward Wingfield Verner	Conservative	Sir Richard Wallace	Conservative	Resigned to contest County Armagh
County Armagh	15 February 1873	Sir William Verner	Conservative	Edward Wingfield Verner	Conservative	Death
Liverpool	7 February 1873	Samuel Robert Graves	Conservative	John Torr	Conservative	Death
Orkney and Shetland	6–7 January 1873	Frederick Dundas	Liberal	Samuel Lang	Liberal	Death
Forfarshire	13 December 1872	Charles Carnegie	Liberal	James William Barclay	Liberal	Resignation (Inspector of Constabulary in Scotland)
Kincardineshire	10 December 1872	James Dyce Nicol	Liberal	George Balfour	Liberal	Death
Cork City	6 December 1872	John Maguire	Liberal	Joseph Philip Ronayne	Home Rule	Death
Londonderry City	23 November 1872	Richard Dowse	Liberal	Charles Edward Lewis	Conservative	Resignation (Baron of the Court of the Exchequer)
Richmond (Yorks)	4 November 1872	Sir Roundell Palmer	Liberal	Lawrence Dundas	Liberal	Appointed Lord Chancellor
Tiverton	4 November 1872	George Denman	Liberal	William Massey	Liberal	Resignation (Justice of the Court of Common Pleas)
Flint Boroughs	16 October 1872	Sir John Hanmer	Liberal	Robert Cunliffe	Liberal	Elevation to the peerage
Preston	13 September 1872	Edward Hermon	Conservative	William Farrer Ecroyd	Conservative	Death
Pontefract	15 August 1872 (Note: Held under the Ballot Act 1872, the first election using the secret ballot.)	Hugh Childers	Liberal	Hugh Childers	Liberal	Chancellor of the Duchy of Lancaster and Paymaster General
Southern West Riding of Yorkshire	8 July 1872	Viscount Milton	Liberal	Walter Spencer-Stanhope	Conservative	Resignation
Aberdeen	29 June 1872	William Henry Sykes	Liberal	John Farley Leith	Liberal	Death
Bedfordshire	27 June 1872	Francis Russell	Liberal	Francis Bassett	Liberal	Succession to a peerage
Mallow	7 June 1872	George Waters	Liberal	William Felix Munster	Liberal	Resignation (Chairman of the Quarter Sessions of the County of Waterford)
Oldham	5 June 1872	John Platt	Liberal	John Morgan Cobbett	Conservative	Death
Wexford	26 April 1872	Richard Joseph Devereux	Liberal	William Archer Redmond	Home Rule	Resignation
Tamworth	16 April 1872	John Peel	Liberal	Robert William Hanbury	Conservative	Death
West Cumberland	26 March 1872	Henry Lowther	Conservative	The Lord Muncaster	Conservative	Succession to a peerage
East Gloucestershire	11 March 1872	Robert Stayner Holford	Conservative	John Reginald Yorke	Conservative	Resignation
Wallingford	9 March 1872	Stanley Vickers	Conservative	Edward Wells	Conservative	Death
Flintshire	2 March 1872	Lord Richard Grosvenor	Liberal	Lord Richard Grosvenor	Liberal	Vice-Chamberlain of the Household
Wick Burghs	28 February 1872	George Loch	Liberal	John Pender	Liberal	Resignation
North Nottinghamshire	26 February 1872	Evelyn Denison	Liberal	George Monckton-Arundell	Conservative	Elevation to the peerage
West Cheshire	17 February 1872	John Tollemache	Conservative	Wilbraham Tollemache	Conservative	Resignation
County Galway	8 February 1872 (Note: On petition Nolan was unseated and William Le Poer Trench (Conservative) was declared elected. Trench was defeated in the 1874 general election by Nolan.)	William Henry Gregory	Liberal	John Philip Nolan	Home Rule	Resignation (Governor of Ceylon)
County Galway	8 February 1872	William Henry Gregory	Home Rule	William Le Poer Trench	Conservative	By-election result reversed on petition
Kerry	6 February 1872	Viscount Castlerosse	Liberal	Rowland Blennerhassett	Home Rule	Succession to a peerage
Northern West Riding of Yorkshire	3 February 1872	Sir Francis Crossley	Liberal	Francis Sharp Powell	Conservative	Death
Dover	25 November 1871	George Jessel	Liberal	George Jessel	Liberal	Solicitor General for England and Wales
Plymouth	22 November 1871	Robert Collier	Liberal	Edward Bates	Conservative	Resignation (Justice of the Court of Common Pleas)
Limerick City	20 September 1871	Francis William Russell	Liberal	Isaac Butt	Home Rule	Death
Truro	13 September 1871	John Cranch Walker Vivian	Liberal	James McGarel-Hogg	Conservative	Resignation (Permanent Under-Secretary of State for War)
East Surrey	26 August 1871	Charles Buxton	Liberal	James Watney, Jr.	Conservative	Death
County Monaghan	22 July 1871	Charles Powell Leslie	Conservative	John Leslie	Conservative	Death
County Westmeath	17 June 1871	William Pollard-Urquhart	Liberal	Patrick James Smyth	Home Rule	Death
West Staffordshire	13 June 1871	Hugo Meynell-Ingram	Conservative	Francis Monckton	Conservative	Death
Durham City	28 April 1871	John Robert Davison	Liberal	John Lloyd Wharton	Conservative	Death
South Norfolk	17 April 1871	Edward Howes	Conservative	Sir Robert Buxton	Conservative	Death
Tamworth	28 March 1871	Henry Bulwer	Liberal	John Peel	Liberal	Elevation to the peerage
Halifax	13 March 1871	James Stansfeld	Liberal	James Stansfeld	Liberal	President of the Poor Law Board
Monmouthshire	4 March 1871	Poulett Somerset	Conservative	Lord Henry Somerset	Conservative	Resignation
Stalybridge	1 March 1871	James Sidebottom	Conservative	Nathaniel Buckley	Liberal	Death
Hereford	28 February 1871	Edward Henry Clive	Liberal	George Arbuthnot	Conservative	Resignation
Norwich	22 February 1871	Jacob Henry Tillett	Liberal	Jeremiah James Colman	Liberal	Void election
County Galway	21 February 1871	Viscount Burke	Liberal	Mitchell Henry	Home Rule	Resignation
Westmorland	21 February 1871	Earl of Bective	Conservative	Earl of Bective	Conservative	Succession to a peerage
Ripon	15 February 1871	Lord John Hay	Liberal	Sir Henry Storks	Liberal	Resignation
York	14 February 1871	Joshua Westhead	Liberal	George Leeman	Liberal	Resignation
West Norfolk	8 February 1871	Thomas de Grey	Conservative	George Bentinck	Conservative	Succession to a peerage
County Limerick	28 January 1871	William Monsell	Liberal	William Monsell	Liberal	Postmaster General
Newry	23 January 1871	William Kirk	Liberal	Viscount Newry and Morne	Conservative	Death
County Meath	17 January 1871	Matthew Corbally	Liberal	John Martin	Ind. Nationalist	Death
Durham City	14 January 1871	John Robert Davison	Liberal	John Robert Davison	Liberal	Judge Advocate General
Newport (Isle of Wight)	23 November 1870	Charles Wykeham Martin	Liberal	Charles Cavendish Clifford	Liberal	Death
Colchester	3 November 1870	John Gurdon Rebow	Liberal	Alexander Learmonth	Conservative	Death
Mid Surrey	17 October 1870	William Brodrick	Conservative	Richard Baggallay	Conservative	Succession to a peerage
Shrewsbury	21 September 1870	William James Clement	Liberal	Douglas Straight	Conservative	Death
West Surrey	8 September 1870	John Ivatt Briscoe	Liberal	Lee Steere	Conservative	Death
Dublin City	18 August 1870	Sir Arthur Guinness	Conservative	Sir Dominic Corrigan	Liberal	Void election
Plymouth	15 August 1870	Sir Robert Collier	Liberal	Sir Robert Collier	Liberal	Recorder of Bristol
Rochester	19 July 1870	John Alexander Kinglake	Liberal	Julian Goldsmid	Liberal	Death
Norwich	13 July 1870	Sir Henry Stracey	Conservative	Jacob Henry Tillett	Liberal	Void election
Bristol	27 June 1870	Elisha Smith Robinson	Liberal	Kirkman Hodgson	Liberal	Void election
South Leicestershire	13 June 1870	Viscount Curzon	Conservative	William Unwin Heygate	Conservative	Succession to a peerage
Isle of Wight	13 June 1870	Sir John Simeon	Liberal	Alexander Baillie-Cochrane	Conservative	Death
Brecon	13 June 1870	Lord Hyde	Liberal	James Gwynne-Holford	Conservative	Succession to a peerage
East Suffolk	1 June 1870	John Henniker-Major	Conservative	Viscount Mahon	Conservative	Succession to a peerage
County Longford	16 May 1870	Reginald Greville-Nugent	Liberal	George Greville-Nugent	Liberal	Void election
County Mayo	12 May 1870	George Henry Moore	Liberal	George Eakins Browne	Liberal	Death
Mallow	10 May 1870	Henry Munster	Liberal	George Waters	Liberal	Void election
East Devon	9 April 1870	Lord Courtenay	Conservative	John Henry Kennaway	Conservative	Resignation
Newark-on-Trent	1 April 1870	Edward Denison	Liberal	Samuel Boteler Bristowe	Liberal	Death
Bristol	29 March 1870	Francis Henry Fitzhardinge Berkeley	Liberal	Elisha Smith Robinson	Liberal	Death
Roxburghshire	2 March 1870	Sir William Scott	Liberal	Marquess of Bowmont	Liberal	Resignation
County Tipperary	28 February 1870	Jeremiah O'Donovan Rossa	Ind. Nationalist	Denis Caulfield Heron	Liberal	Disqualification (convicted felon)
Waterford City	25 February 1870	Sir Henry Barron	Liberal	Ralph Bernal Osborne	Liberal	Void election
Maidstone	25 February 1870	William Lee	Liberal	Sir John Lubbock	Liberal	Resignation
Nottingham	24 February 1870	Charles Ichabod Wright	Conservative	Auberon Herbert	Liberal	Resignation
Southwark	17 February 1870	Austen Henry Layard	Liberal	Marcus Beresford	Conservative	Resignation (Ambassador to Spain)
Bridgnorth	16 February 1870	Henry Whitmore	Conservative	William Henry Foster	Liberal	Resignation
Londonderry City	15 February 1870	Richard Dowse	Liberal	Richard Dowse	Liberal	Solicitor General for Ireland
Dublin University	14 February 1870	Anthony Lefroy	Conservative	David Robert Plunket	Conservative	Resignation
Mallow	3 February 1870	Edward Sullivan	Liberal	Henry Munster	Liberal	Resignation (Irish Master of the Rolls)
Merionethshire	17 January 1870	David Williams	Liberal	Samuel Holland	Liberal	Death
Queen's County	4 January 1870	John FitzPatrick	Liberal	Edmund Dease	Liberal	Elevation to the peerage
County Longford	31 December 1869	Fulke Greville-Nugent	Liberal	Reginald Greville-Nugent	Liberal	Elevation to the peerage
King's Lynn	9 December 1869	Lord Stanley	Conservative	Lord Claud Hamilton	Conservative	Succession to a peerage
Chester	4 December 1869	Earl Grosvenor	Liberal	Norman de L'Aigle Grosvenor	Liberal	Succession to a peerage
County Tipperary	27 November 1869	Charles Moore	Liberal	Jeremiah O'Donovan Rossa	Ind. Nationalist	Death
Waterford City	22 November 1869	John Aloysius Blake	Liberal	Sir Henry Winston Barron	Liberal	Resignation (Inspector of Irish Fisheries)
Glasgow and Aberdeen; Universities	22 November 1869	James Moncreiff	Liberal	Edward Gordon	Conservative	Resignation (Lord Justice Clerk)
Whitby	18 November 1869	William Henry Gladstone	Liberal	William Henry Gladstone	Liberal	Lord Commissioner of the Treasury
Hastings	18 November 1869	Frederick North	Liberal	Ughtred Kay-Shuttleworth	Liberal	Death
Tower Hamlets	8 November 1869	Acton Smee Ayrton	Liberal	Acton Smee Ayrton	Liberal	First Commissioner of Works and Public Buildings
East Cheshire	6 October 1869	Edward Egerton	Conservative	William Cunliffe Brooks	Conservative	Death
Caithness	26 August 1869	George Traill	Liberal	Sir John Sinclair	Independent Liberal	Resignation
County Antrim	21 August 1869	Henry Seymour	Conservative	Hugh Seymour	Conservative	Death
Salisbury	5 August 1869	Edward Hamilton	Liberal	Alfred Seymour	Liberal	Resignation
Nottingham	16 June 1869	Sir Robert Juckes Clifton	Liberal	Charles Seely	Liberal	Death
Stafford	7 June 1869	Walter Meller	Conservative	Thomas Salt	Conservative	Void election
Stafford	7 June 1869	Henry Pochin	Liberal	Reginald Talbot	Conservative	Void election
Youghal	11 May 1869	Christopher Weguelin	Liberal	Montague Guest	Liberal	Void election
Liskeard	11 May 1869	Sir Arthur Buller	Liberal	Edward Horsman	Liberal	Death
Brecon	24 April 1869	Howel Gwyn	Conservative	Lord Hyde	Liberal	Void election
West Sussex	17 April 1869	Henry Wyndham	Conservative	Earl of March	Conservative	Succession to a peerage
Dumfriesshire	31 March 1869	Sydney Waterlow	Liberal	George Gustavus Walker	Conservative	Disqualification (government contractor)
Hereford	30 March 1869	George Clive	Liberal	Edward Henry Clive	Liberal	Void election
Hereford	30 March 1869	John Wyllie	Liberal	Chandos Wren-Hoskyns	Liberal	Void election
Blackburn	30 March 1869	William Henry Hornby	Conservative	Edward Kenworthy Hornby	Conservative	Void election
Blackburn	30 March 1869	Joseph Feilden	Conservative	Henry Feilden	Conservative	Void election
Drogheda	15 March 1869	Benjamin Whitworth	Liberal	Thomas Whitworth	Liberal	Void election
Scarborough	12 March 1869	Sir John Vanden-Bempde-Johnstone	Liberal	Sir Harcourt Vanden-Bempde-Johnstone	Liberal	Death
Bradford	12 March 1869	Henry Ripley	Liberal	Edward Miall	Liberal	Void election
Bewdley	11 March 1869 (Note: On petition Cunliffe was unseated and Augustus Henry Archibald Anson (Liberal) was declared elected. He was re-elected in the 1874 general election.)	Richard Atwood Glass	Conservative	John Cunliffe	Conservative	Void election
Bewdley	11 March 1869	Richard Atwood Glass	Conservative	Augustus Anson	Liberal	By-election result reversed on petition
Westbury	27 February 1869	John Lewis Phipps	Conservative	Charles Paul Phipps	Conservative	Void election
Wexford	26 February 1869	Richard Joseph Devereux	Liberal	Richard Joseph Devereux	Liberal	Void election
Radnor Boroughs	25 February 1869	Richard Green-Price	Liberal	Marquess of Hartington	Liberal	Resignation
City of London	22 February 1869	Charles Bell	Conservative	Baron Lionel Nathan de Rothschild	Liberal	Death
Renfrewshire	25 January 1869	Archibald Alexander Speirs	Liberal	Henry Bruce	Liberal	Death
South Derbyshire	16 January 1869	Sir Thomas Gresley	Conservative	Henry Wilmot	Conservative	Death
County Louth	11 January 1869	Chichester Fortescue	Liberal	Chichester Fortescue	Liberal	Chief Secretary for Ireland
County Kildare	11 January 1869	Lord Otho Fitzgerald	Liberal	Lord Otho Fitzgerald	Liberal	Comptroller of the Household
County Westmeath	7 January 1869	Algernon Greville	Liberal	Algernon Greville	Liberal	Parliamentary Groom in Waiting
County Kerry	7 January 1869	Viscount Castlerosse	Liberal	Viscount Castlerosse	Liberal	Vice-Chamberlain of the Household
Clackmannanshire and Kinross-shire	6 January 1869	William Patrick Adam	Liberal	William Patrick Adam	Liberal	Lord Commissioner of the Treasury
County Clare	5 January 1869	Sir Colman O'Loghlen	Liberal	Sir Colman O'Loghlen	Liberal	Judge Advocate General
Mallow	4 January 1869	Edward Sullivan	Liberal	Edward Sullivan	Liberal	Attorney General for Ireland
Wigtown Burghs	4 January 1869	George Young	Liberal	George Young	Liberal	Solicitor General for Scotland
Hawick Burghs	4 January 1869	George Otto Trevelyan	Liberal	George Otto Trevelyan	Liberal	Civil Lord of the Admiralty
Wareham	23 December 1868	John Calcraft	Liberal	John Erle-Drax	Conservative	Death
Oxford	22 December 1868	Edward Cardwell	Liberal	Edward Cardwell	Liberal	Secretary of State for War
London University	21 December 1868	Robert Lowe	Liberal	Robert Lowe	Liberal	Chancellor of the Exchequer
Truro	21 December 1868	John Vivian	Liberal	John Vivian	Liberal	Lord Commissioner of the Treasury
Ripon	21 December 1868	Lord John Hay	Liberal	Lord John Hay	Liberal	Junior Naval Lord
Pontefract	21 December 1868	Hugh Childers	Liberal	Hugh Childers	Liberal	First Lord of the Admiralty
Plymouth	21 December 1868	Sir Robert Porrett Collier	Liberal	Sir Robert Porrett Collier	Liberal	Attorney General for England and Wales
Halifax	21 December 1868	James Stansfeld	Liberal	James Stansfeld	Liberal	Lord Commissioner of the Treasury
Exeter	21 December 1868	John Coleridge	Liberal	Sir John Coleridge	Liberal	Solicitor General for England and Wales
Bradford	21 December 1868	William Edward Forster	Liberal	William Edward Forster	Liberal	Vice President of the Committee of Council on Education
Birmingham	21 December 1868	John Bright	Liberal	John Bright	Liberal	President of the Board of Trade
Southwark	21 December 1868	Austen Henry Layard	Liberal	Austen Henry Layard	Liberal	First Commissioner of Works
Greenwich	21 December 1868	William Ewart Gladstone	Liberal	William Ewart Gladstone	Liberal	Prime Minister and First Lord of the Treasury
City of London	21 December 1868	George Goschen	Liberal	George Goschen	Liberal	President of the Poor Law Board

== Sources ==
- List of MPs since 1660
- Craig, F. W. S., ed. (1977). British Parliamentary Election Results 1832–1885. Macmillan Press. OL 4608244M.
- Craig, F. W. S. (ed.). Chronology of British Parliamentary By-elections 1833–1987. OL 2318306M.
- Craig, F. W. S. (ed.). British Electoral Facts 1832–1987. OL 2197265M.
- Walker, B. M., ed. (1978). Parliamentary Election Results in Ireland, 1801–1922. Dublin: Royal Irish Academy. ISBN 0901714127.
