= Northern West Riding of Yorkshire =

Parliamentary constituency in the United Kingdom, 1865–1885

- Former county constituency for the House of Commons
- County: West Riding of Yorkshire

1865–1885
- Seats: Two
- Created from: West Riding of Yorkshire
- Replaced by: Elland, Keighley, Shipley, Skipton and Sowerby

Northern West Riding of Yorkshire was a parliamentary constituency covering part of the historic West Riding of Yorkshire. It returned two Members of Parliament (MPs) to the House of Commons of the Parliament of the United Kingdom, elected by the bloc vote system.

== History ==
The constituency was created when the two-member West Riding of Yorkshire constituency was divided for the 1865 general election into two new constituencies, each returning two members: Northern West Riding of Yorkshire and Southern West Riding of Yorkshire. The extra seats were taken from parliamentary boroughs which had been disenfranchised for corruption.

In the redistribution which took effect for the 1868 general election the two divisions were redistributed into three. Eastern West Riding of Yorkshire was created and the Northern and Southern divisions modified. Each of the three divisions returned two members.

All three were abolished by the Redistribution of Seats Act 1885 for the 1885 general election. The Northern division was replaced by five new single-member constituencies: Elland, Keighley, Shipley, Skipton and Sowerby.

== Boundaries ==
The place of election was initially at Leeds (Birkenhead Enfranchisement Act 1861), later at Bradford (Boundary Act 1868).

From 1865 to 1868 the constituency comprised the north half of the West Riding of Yorkshire. The Birkenhead Enfranchisement Act 1861 provided that it was to contain the wapentakes of Staincliffe and Ewecross, Claro, Skyrack, and Morley.

The Reform Act 1867 re-defined the constituency as the wapentake of Staincliffe and Ewcross, Claro, Skyrack, Barkston Ash, and Osgoldcross.

The Boundary Act 1868 again re-defined the constituency as the wapentake of Staincliffe and Ewcross with part of the wapentake of Morley (the parishes of Bradford and Halifax and the townships of Boston and Idle).

== Members of Parliament ==
Election	1st member	1st party	2nd member	2nd party
1865	Sir Francis Crossley	Liberal	Lord Frederick Cavendish	Liberal
1872	Francis Powell	Conservative	Lord Frederick Cavendish	Liberal
1874	Sir Mathew Wilson, Bt	Liberal	Lord Frederick Cavendish	Liberal
1882	Sir Mathew Wilson, Bt	Liberal	Isaac Holden	Liberal
1885	constituency abolished: see Elland, Keighley, Shipley, Skipton and Sowerby			

== Election results ==
=== Elections in the 1860s ===
General election 1865: Northern West Riding of Yorkshire
Party	Candidate	Votes	%	±%
Liberal	Frederick Cavendish	Unopposed		
Liberal	Francis Crossley	Unopposed		
Registered electors		22,792		
Liberal win (new seat)				
Liberal win (new seat)				

General election 1868: Northern West Riding of Yorkshire
Party	Candidate	Votes	%	±%
Liberal	Frederick Cavendish	Unopposed		
Liberal	Francis Crossley	Unopposed		
Registered electors		16,918		
Liberal hold				
Liberal hold				

=== Elections in the 1870s ===
Crossley's death caused a by-election.

By-election, 3 Feb 1872: Northern West Riding of Yorkshire
Party	Candidate	Votes	%	±%
Conservative	Francis Powell	6,961	50.2	New
Liberal	Isaac Holden	6,917	49.8	N/A
Majority		44	0.4	N/A
Turnout		13,878	81.2	N/A
Registered electors		17,084		
Conservative gain from Liberal		Swing	N/A	

Cavendish was appointed a Lord Commissioner of the Treasury, requiring a by-election.

By-election, 27 Aug 1873: Northern West Riding of Yorkshire
Party	Candidate	Votes	%	±%
Liberal	Frederick Cavendish	Unopposed		
Liberal hold				

General election 1874: Northern West Riding of Yorkshire
Party	Candidate	Votes	%	±%
Liberal	Frederick Cavendish	8,681	26.4	N/A
Liberal	Mathew Wilson	8,598	26.2	N/A
Conservative	Francis Powell	7,820	23.8	N/A
Conservative	William Fison	7,725	23.5	N/A
Majority		778	2.4	N/A
Turnout		16,412 (est)	81.5 (est)	N/A
Registered electors		20,130		
Liberal hold		Swing	N/A	
Liberal hold		Swing	N/A	

=== Elections in the 1880s ===
General election 1880: Northern West Riding of Yorkshire
Party	Candidate	Votes	%	±%
Liberal	Frederick Cavendish	10,818	30.2	+3.8
Liberal	Mathew Wilson	10,732	30.0	+3.8
Conservative	Samuel Lister	7,140	20.0	−3.5
Conservative	Francis Powell	7,096	19.8	−4.0
Majority		3,592	10.0	+7.6
Turnout		17,893 (est)	81.9 (est)	+0.4
Registered electors		21,840		
Liberal hold		Swing	+3.7	
Liberal hold		Swing	+3.9	

Cavendish was appointed Chief Secretary to the Lord Lieutenant of Ireland, causing a by-election. However, on 6 May 1882, just hours after taking the oath for the position, Cavendish was assassinated in Dublin in the Phoenix Park Murders.

By-election, 20 May 1882: Northern West Riding of Yorkshire
Party	Candidate	Votes	%	±%
Liberal	Isaac Holden	9,892	55.7	−4.5
Conservative	Alfred Gathorne-Hardy	7,865	44.3	+4.5
Majority		2,027	11.4	+1.4
Turnout		17,757	80.2	−1.7
Registered electors		22,138		
Liberal hold		Swing	−4.5	
