= Ron Watson =

Ron or Ronald Watson may refer to:

- Ron Watson (rugby league), Australian rugby league player
- Ron Watson (sailor) (born 1937), New Zealand sailor
- Ron Watson (politician), American politician in the Maryland House of Delegates
- Ronald Watson (cricketer) (1883–1966), Scottish cricketer, cricket administrator, and advocate
