= 1882 Caernarvon Boroughs by-election =

UK parliamentary by-election in Wales

The 1882 Caernarvon Boroughs by-election was a parliamentary by-election held for the House of Commons constituency of Caernarvon Boroughs in North Wales on 30 March 1882.

== Vacancy ==
The by-election was caused by the death of the sitting Liberal MP, William Bulkeley Hughes.

== Candidates ==
Two candidates nominated.

The Liberal Party nominated Welsh landowner Love Jones-Parry.

An independent Liberal Robert Sorton-Parry also nominated. He was a former Sheriff of Caernarvonshire.

== Results ==
1882 Caernarvon Boroughs by-election
| Party | Candidate | Votes | % | ±% |
|---|---|---|---|---|
| Liberal | Love Jones-Parry | 2,037 | 77.4 | N/A |
| Independent Liberal | Robert Sorton-Parry | 596 | 22.6 | N/A |
| Majority | | 1,441 | 54.8 | N/A |
| Turnout | | 2,633 | 62.3 | N/A |
| Registered electors | | 4,223 | | |
| Liberal hold | | Swing | N/A | |

== See also ==
- List of United Kingdom by-elections (1868–1885)
