= 1878 Canterbury by-election =

UK Parliamentary by-election

The 1878 Canterbury by-election was fought on 2 March 1878. The by-election was fought due to the resignation of the incumbent Conservative MP, Henry Munro-Butler-Johnstone. It was won by the Conservative candidate Alfred Gathorne-Hardy, who was unopposed.
