= Glasgow and Aberdeen Universities =

Former parliamentary constituency in the United Kingdom

- Former university constituency for the House of Commons

1868–1918
- Seats: 1
- Replaced by: Combined Scottish Universities

Glasgow and Aberdeen Universities, in Scotland, was a university constituency represented in the House of Commons of the Parliament of the United Kingdom from 1868 until 1918. It was merged with the Edinburgh and St Andrews Universities constituency to form the Combined Scottish Universities constituency.

== Members of Parliament ==
Election	Member	Party
1868	James Moncreiff	Liberal
1869 by-election	Edward Gordon	Conservative
1876 by-election	William Watson	Conservative
1880	James Alexander Campbell	Conservative
1906	Sir Henry Craik	Unionist
1918	constituency abolished: see Combined Scottish Universities	

== Election results ==
=== Elections in the 1910s ===
General election December 1910: Glasgow and Aberdeen Universities
Party	Candidate	Votes	%	±%
Conservative	Henry Craik	Unopposed		
Conservative hold				

General election January 1910: Glasgow and Aberdeen Universities
Party	Candidate	Votes	%	±%
Conservative	Henry Craik	4,879	58.9	+9.9
Free Trader	Frederick Pollock	3,411	41.1	+24.0
Majority		1,468	17.8	+2.7
Turnout		8,290	70.8	+2.2
Registered electors		11,705		
Conservative hold		Swing	−7.1	

=== Elections in the 1900s ===
General election 1906: Glasgow and Aberdeen Universities
Party	Candidate	Votes	%	±%
Conservative	Henry Craik	3,543	49.0	N/A
Liberal	Alexander Murison	2,450	33.9	New
Free Trader	W.R. Smith	1,240	17.1	N/A
Majority		1,093	15.1	N/A
Turnout		7,233	68.6	N/A
Registered electors		10,545		
Conservative hold		Swing	N/A	

General election 1900: Glasgow and Aberdeen Universities
Party	Candidate	Votes	%	±%
Conservative	James Alexander Campbell	Unopposed		
Conservative hold				

=== Elections in the 1890s ===
General election 1895: Glasgow and Aberdeen Universities
Party	Candidate	Votes	%	±%
Conservative	James Alexander Campbell	Unopposed		
Conservative hold				

General election 1892: Glasgow and Aberdeen Universities
Party	Candidate	Votes	%	±%
Conservative	James Alexander Campbell	Unopposed		
Conservative hold				

=== Elections in the 1880s ===
General election 1886: Glasgow and Aberdeen Universities
Party	Candidate	Votes	%	±%
Conservative	James Alexander Campbell	Unopposed		
Conservative hold				

General election 1885: Glasgow and Aberdeen Universities
Party	Candidate	Votes	%	±%
Conservative	James Alexander Campbell	Unopposed		
Conservative hold				

General election 1880: Glasgow and Aberdeen Universities
Party	Candidate	Votes	%	±%
Conservative	James Alexander Campbell	2,520	54.1	N/A
Liberal	Alexander Asher	2,139	45.9	N/A
Majority		381	8.2	N/A
Turnout		4,659	78.1	N/A
Registered electors		5,969		
Conservative hold				

=== Elections in the 1870s ===
By-election, 14 Nov 1876: Glasgow and Aberdeen Universities
Party	Candidate	Votes	%	±%
Conservative	William Watson	2,392	57.2	N/A
Liberal	Anderson Kirkwood	1,788	42.8	New
Majority		604	14.4	N/A
Turnout		4,180	77.6	N/A
Registered electors		5,389		
Conservative hold				

- Caused by Gordon's appointment as a Lord of Appeal, becoming Lord Gordon of Drumearn.

By-election, 14 Mar 1874: Glasgow and Aberdeen Universities
Party	Candidate	Votes	%	±%
Conservative	Edward Gordon	Unopposed		
Conservative hold				

- Caused by Gordon's appointment as Lord Advocate.

General election 1874: Glasgow and Aberdeen Universities
Party	Candidate	Votes	%	±%
Conservative	Edward Gordon	Unopposed		
Registered electors		4,776		
Conservative gain from Liberal				

=== Elections in the 1860s ===
By-election, 22 November 1869: Glasgow and Aberdeen Universities
Party	Candidate	Votes	%	±%
Conservative	Edward Gordon	2,120	56.7	+7.3
Liberal	Archibald Smith	1,616	43.3	−7.3
Majority		504	13.4	N/A
Turnout		3,736	85.5	−8.1
Registered electors		4,368		
Conservative gain from Liberal		Swing	+7.3	

- Caused by Moncreiff's appointment as Lord Justice Clerk and elevation to the peerage, becoming Lord Moncreiff.

General election 1868: Glasgow and Aberdeen Universities
Party	Candidate	Votes	%	±%
Liberal	James Moncreiff	2,067	50.6	N/A
Conservative	Edward Gordon	2,020	49.4	N/A
Majority		47	1.2	N/A
Turnout		4,087	93.6	N/A
Registered electors		4,368		
Liberal win (new seat)				
