= James Alexander Campbell (politician) =

Scottish businessman and politician

Campbell in 1895.

James Alexander Campbell PC DL (1825 – 9 May 1908) was a Scottish businessman and Conservative politician.

== Biography ==
Campbell was born in George Square, Glasgow a son of Sir James Campbell of Stracathro and his wife Janet Bannerman of Manchester. His father established the firm J & W Campbell, wholesale merchants and was Lord Provost of Glasgow between 1840 and 1843. Campbell was educated at Glasgow High School and Glasgow University and became a partner in the family firm of J & W Campbell. He became a member of Glasgow University Council in 1859, and in 1865 was appointed convener of the committee in charge of raising of funds to build and maintain a new university on Gilmorehill. He held the post until 1894. He was assessor to two rectors and two chancellors, being a member of the University Court from 1869 till 1884, when he received the degree of LL.D. On the death of his father in 1876 he inherited the Stracathro estate near Brechin of some 4,000 acres (16 km^{2}). He was a J.P. and Deputy Lieutenant for the counties of Lanark and Forfar.

In 1880, Campbell was elected Member of Parliament for Glasgow and Aberdeen Universities, and held the seat until 1906. As a Conservative he was opposed to the policies of his brother, Henry Campbell-Bannerman, Liberal prime minister from 1905 to 1908. He acted on many Commissions appointed to enquire into Scottish educational endowments and the constitution of the Scottish Universities.

Campbell married in 1854, Ann Peto, daughter of Sir S. Morton Peto, Bt. a railway contractor, and they had one son and three daughters. He died at Stracathro at the age of 83 after a lingering illness, a fortnight later than his brother.

Parliament of the United Kingdom
Preceded by William Watson	Member of Parliament for Glasgow and Aberdeen Universities; 1880–1906	Succeeded by Sir Henry Craik
