= Geoffrey Malcolm Gathorne-Hardy =

Geoffrey Malcolm Gathorne-Hardy, who wrote as G. M. Gathorne-Hardy (28 January 1878 – 7 January 1972), was an English soldier, writer and Norse specialist.

== Life ==
Geoffrey Malcolm Gathorne-Hardy was the son of the Conservative MP Alfred Gathorne-Hardy and Isabella Louisa Malcolm. He was educated at Eton and New College, Oxford, where he was President of the Oxford Union in 1899. He fought in the Boer War, losing a finger. Called to the Bar in 1903, he was in Norway in 1905, when the country gained independence, and he learned Norwegian as well as some Danish and Icelandic. In 1910 he travelled with Hesketh Hesketh-Prichard from Nain, Newfoundland and Labrador, to Indian House Lake on George River, and contributed a chapter on fishing to Prichard's Through trackless Labrador (1911).

In 1914, he married Eleanor Kathleen Goschen, the sister of Arthur Goschen.

Gathorne-Hardy lost a foot in the First World War, where he was mentioned in despatches and awarded the Military Cross and the Croix de Guerre (Belgium). In 1921 he published The Norse discoverers of America. He was a founding member of Chatham House and, with Lionel Curtis, Honorary Secretary from 1922. From 1923 to 1928 he was assistant librarian at the House of Lords. In World War II "he worked on Norwegian propaganda and acted as an unofficial delegate to the Norwegian government in exile", later receiving the Order of St Olaf and an honorary PhD from the University of Oslo.

After the war he published A Royal Imposter (1956), which argues that King Sverre was not of royal lineage. He also published some translations of Norwegian, Danish and Icelandic poetry, and a verse translation of Henrik Ibsen's Brand.

== Works ==
- (tr.) The Norse discoverers of America: the Wineland Sagas, Oxford:Clarendon Press, 1921
- Norway, 1925
- (tr. with Jethro Bithell and I. Grøndahl) Poems by Henrik Wergeland, 1929
- The fourteen points and the treaty of Versailles, Oxford: Clarendon Press, 1929. Oxford pamphlets on world affairs, no. 6.
- Norway and the War, London: Oxford University Press, 1941. Oxford pamphlets on world affairs, no. 51.
- A short history of international affairs, 1920-1939, 1942
- A royal impostor: King Sverre of Norway, 1956
- (tr.) Brand by Henrik Ibsen, 1966.
