= Corrigan baronets =

Extinct baronetcy in the Baronetage of the United Kingdom

The Corrigan Baronetcy, of Cappagh and Inniscorrig in the County of Dublin and of Merrion Square in the City of Dublin, was a title in the Baronetage of the United Kingdom. It was created on 5 February 1866 for the Irish physician Dominic Corrigan. The title became extinct on the early death of his grandson, the second Baronet, in 1883.

== Corrigan baronets, of Cappagh, Inniscorrig and Merrion Square (1866) ==
- Sir Dominic John Corrigan, 1st Baronet (1802–1880)
  - John Corrigan (died 1866)
- Sir John Joseph Corrigan, 2nd Baronet (1859–1883)

== Arms ==
Coat of arms of Corrigan baronets

Notes
Granted 6 March 1860 by Sir John Berard Burke, Ulster King of Arms.
Crest
A sword in pale point downwards in front thereof two battleaxes in saltire all Proper.
Escutcheon
Or a chevron between two trefoils slipped Vert in chief and a lizard in base Proper.
Motto
Consilio Et Impetu
