= 1874 Glasgow and Aberdeen Universities by-election =

UK parliamentary by-election

The 1874 Glasgow and Aberdeen Universities by-election was fought on 14 March 1874. The by-election was fought due to the incumbent Conservative MP, Edward Strathearn Gordon, becoming Lord Advocate. It was retained by the incumbent who was unopposed.
