= 1885 Aylesbury by-election =

UK parliamentary by-election

The 1885 Aylesbury by-election was a by-election held on Thursday 16 July 1885 for the British House of Commons constituency of Aylesbury in Buckinghamshire.

== Vacancy ==
The by-election was caused by the elevation to the peerage of the sitting Liberal MP Sir Nathaniel Rothschild (usually known as 'Natty') of the famous Rothschild merchant banking family. Rothschild had been one of the two MPs for Aylesbury since 1865. However, since the formation of the Liberal government of W E Gladstone in 1880, Rothschild had become increasingly disillusioned with the policies of his leader. In particular he was odds with Gladstone's foreign policy in the Middle East and domestically he was an opponent of Irish home rule. It is likely that Gladstone agreed to send Rothschild to the House of Lords to reinforce his Liberal sympathies or perhaps to have him replaced in the Commons by someone more supportive of party policy. In neither case was he successful.

== Candidates ==
The Liberals chose another scion of the Rothschild family, Ferdinand de Rothschild. 'Ferdy' Rothschild, who was aged 46 years at the time of the by-election, was a man of considerable independent means as a result of his family connections and spent most of his time in art collecting and appreciation, although he also had a great fondness for country sports. It was Ferdy who was responsible for the building of the magnificent, Château-like Waddesdon Manor. Ferdinand was the brother-in-law of Natty Rothschild, who was the brother of Ferdy's late wife Evelina (1839-1866). Natty did not like Ferdinand and considered him 'effete, fussy and pretentious'. However politically, as it turned out, Ferdinand was in tune with his brother-in-law as they both moved from the Liberal to the Liberal Unionist Party cutting themselves off from Gladstone on the issue of Ireland.

The Conservatives, who had a history of sharing the Aylesbury seat with the Liberals, chose Mr William Graham as their candidate.

== The campaign ==
Graham announced his candidature and launched his campaign at the market ordinary held at the George Hotel in Aylesbury on 27 June 1885 with a speech to assembled businessmen. Rothschild issued an address to the electors on 30 June. Among the reforms he said he would support were measures for making the transfer of land cheaper and easier, equalising duties on the property and the abolition or modification of the law on entail. He was in favour of some degree of the licensing of public houses to be placed in the hands of the ratepayers, deplored the economic conditions which had afflicted rural areas and pledged to do what he could to alleviate hardships and make the cultivation of land more attractive. He stated that every cottage occupier should be given enough garden ground to grow his food and, like other members of his family, said he was strongly supportive of measures designed to extend and secure civil and religious rights. He was a free trader, opposed to any levies of taxes on imported food. These articulate sounding views may not however have been all Ferdinand's own work. The Liberal politician Lewis 'Loulou' Harcourt regarded Ferdy as something of a political protégée but wrote in his diary that while he was glad Ferdinand had been selected as a candidate, senior Liberals had reservations that he was capable of getting through the campaign without someone to look after him. He also recorded that Ferdy was 'profoundly ignorant on all political subjects and was in need of a great deal of cramming'. Fortunately, Harcourt records, he was to visit the constituency soon and speak for Rothschild and no doubt did his best to bring his protégée up to scratch.

Meetings and canvassing took place, with visits from Liberal and Conservative MPs – some were described as 'uproarious' and a free for all took place outside the George Hotel after polls had closed on the evening of 16 July.

== Result ==
Rothschild comfortably held the seat for the Liberals with a majority of 937 votes. This seems to have come as something of a surprise for the other Liberal MP for Aylesbury, George Russell. On the eve of poll, Russell had confided in Louisa, Lady Knightley of Fawsley, the wife of Tory MP Rainald Knightley, that he was low at the possible outcome of the contest. Lady Knightley recorded in her journal that it would be a triumph if the Conservatives were to beat Rothschild. This is confirmed by Loulou Harcourt who wrote in his Journal for 17 July 1885 that when he got a telegram from Rothschild with the result of the by-election he was pleased the majority was very much larger than expected and most satisfactory for most of the electors were agricultural labourers. The result must also therefore have been a relief to Gladstone and the Liberal leadership, although not for too long in view of the Rothschilds' defection to the cause of Liberal Unionism.

Ferdy Rothschild held his seat as a Liberal at the 1885 general election and retained it as a Liberal Unionist thereafter at every election until dying in office in December 1898.

Aylesbury by-election, 16 July 1885
Party	Candidate	Votes	%	±%
Liberal	Ferdinand de Rothschild	2,353	62.4	−10.3
Conservative	William Graham	1,416	37.6	+10.3
Majority		937	24.8	+17.5
Turnout		3,769	84.3	+18.7
Liberal hold		Swing	-10.3	

== See also ==
- Aylesbury
- List of United Kingdom by-elections (1868–1885)
