= 1871 York by-election =

UK parliamentary by-election

The 1871 York by-election was a by-election held in England on 14 February 1871 for the UK House of Commons constituency of York. It was held due to the resignation of the incumbent Liberal MP, Joshua Proctor Brown Westhead. It was won by the unopposed Liberal candidate George Leeman.
