= 1879 Canterbury by-election =

UK Parliamentary by-election

The 1879 Canterbury by-election was held on 8 May 1879. The by-election was fought due to the resignation of the incumbent Conservative MP, Lewis Majendie. It was won by the Conservative candidate Robert Peter Laurie.

== Corruption ==
The Liberal candidate Charles Edwards was accused of spending about £140 (equivalent to £16,920 in 2023) on buying votes during the campaign. Although Edwards disclaimed knowledge of this and blamed his campaign manager, he did admit that the money was spent on bribery.

Canterbury by-election, 1879
Party	Candidate	Votes	%	±%
Conservative	Robert Peter Laurie	1,159	51.2	−10.4
Liberal	Charles Edwards	1,103	48.8	+10.3
Majority		56	2.4	−7.6
Turnout		2,262	73.2	−2.5
Conservative hold		Swing	-10.4	
