= Ronald Watson (cricketer) =

Scottish cricketer (1883–1966)

Ronald Watson The Honourable
Personal information
- Full name: Ronald Bannatyne Watson
- Born: 28 September 1883; Edinburgh, Midlothian, Scotland
- Died: 22 January 1966 (aged 82); Edinburgh, Midlothian, Scotland
- Batting: Unknown

Domestic team information
- Years: Team
- 1913: Scotland

Career statistics
Competition	First-class
Matches	1
Runs scored	11
Batting average	5.50
100s/50s	–/–
Top score	6
Catches/stumpings	–/–
- Source: Cricinfo, 22 October 2022

The Hon. Ronald Bannatyne Watson (28 September 1883 – 22 January 1966) was a Scottish first-class cricketer, cricket administrator, and advocate.

The son of William Watson, Baron Watson and Margaret Bannatyne, he was born at Edinburgh in September 1883. He was educated at Marlborough College, before matriculating to Trinity College, Cambridge. Having studied law at Cambridge, Watson was appointed an advocate in 1909. A club cricketer for Grange, Watson made a single appearance in first-class cricket for Scotland against Ireland at Edinburgh in 1913. Batting twice in the match, he was run out in Scotland's first innings for 5 runs and was dismissed for 6 runs in their second innings by Frederick Shaw. Watson served in the British Army during the First World War, being commissioned as a second lieutenant in the Royal Scots in October 1914. By August 1915, he was a lieutenant serving as an adjutant. Watson later served as the president of the Scottish Cricket Union in 1933. He died at Edinburgh in January 1966.
