= 1876 Glasgow and Aberdeen Universities by-election =

The 1876 Glasgow and Aberdeen Universities by-election was held on 6–10 November 1876. The by-election was triggered due to the resignation (Lords of Appeal in Ordinary) of the incumbent Conservative MP, Edward Strathearn Gordon. It was won by the Conservative candidate William Watson.
