= 1878 York by-election =

UK parliamentary by-election

The 1878 York by-election was a by-election held in England on 20 February 1878 for the UK House of Commons constituency of York. The by-election was held due to the incumbent Conservative MP, James Lowther, becoming Chief Secretary for Ireland. It was retained by the unopposed incumbent.
