= William Watson, Baron Watson =

Scottish lawyer, politician and law lord

The Right Honourable The Lord Watson PC
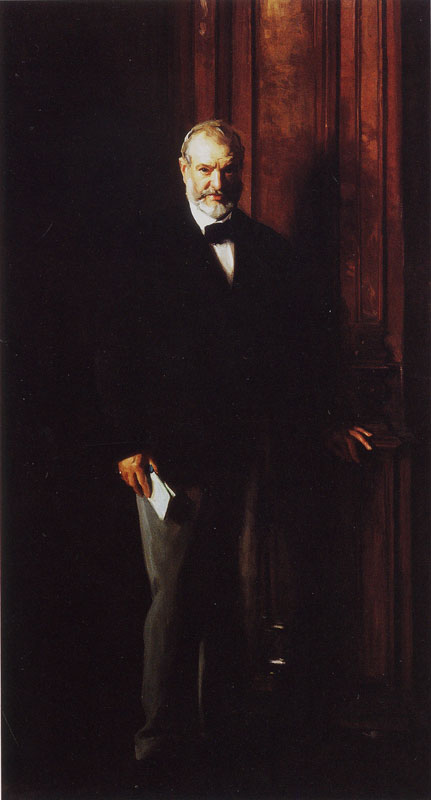

Lord Advocate
- In office 1876–1880
- Monarch: Queen Victoria
- Prime Minister: Benjamin Disraeli
- Deputy: John Macdonald, as Solicitor General for Scotland
- Preceded by: Edward Gordon
- Succeeded by: John McLaren

Solicitor General for Scotland
- In office 1874–1876
- Monarch: Queen Victoria
- Prime Minister: Benjamin Disraeli
- Preceded by: John Millar
- Succeeded by: John Macdonald

Member of Parliament for Glasgow and Aberdeen Universities
- In office 1876–1880
- Preceded by: Edward Gordon
- Succeeded by: James Alexander Campbell

Personal details
- Born: 25 August 1827 Covington, Lanarkshire
- Died: 14 September 1899 (aged 71)
- Party: Conservative
- Spouse: Margaret Bannatyne
- Education: University of Glasgow, University of Edinburgh
- Profession: Advocate

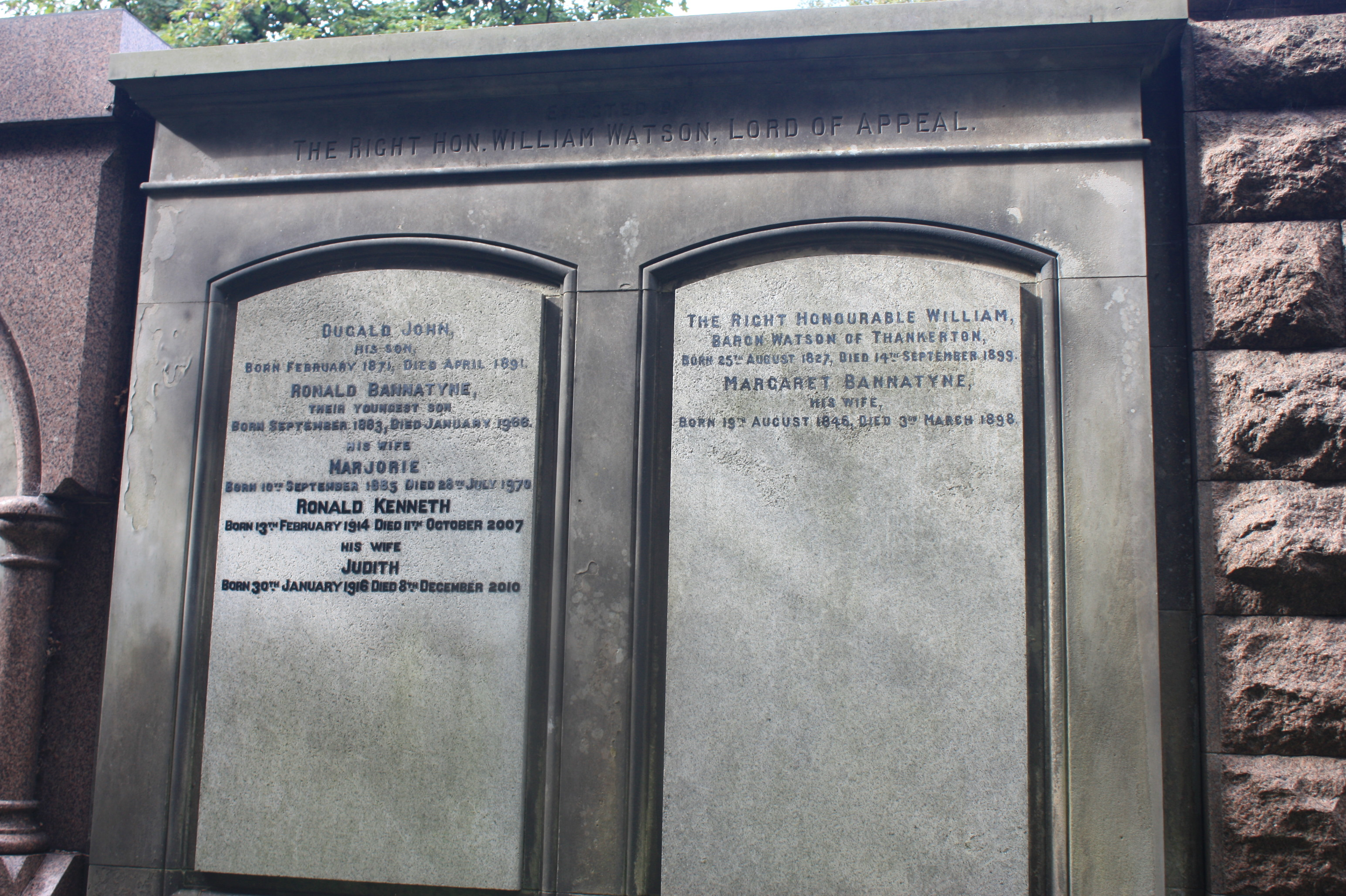
Baron Watson's grave, Dean Cemetery

William Watson, Baron Watson, PC (25 August 1827 – 14 September 1899) was a Scottish lawyer and Conservative Party politician. He was Lord Advocate, the most senior Law Officer in Scotland, from 1876 to 1880, and was then appointed a Lord of Appeal in Ordinary.

== Early life ==
Watson was born in Covington, Lanarkshire on 25 August 1827. He was the eldest son and second of the six children of Eleonora and Reverend Thomas Watson. He was educated privately and studied law at the universities of Glasgow and Edinburgh. He was admitted to the Faculty of Advocates in 1851 and appeared for the defence of Dr Edward William Pritchard, the poisoner, in 1865.

== Career ==
Watson was appointed Solicitor General for Scotland, one of the Scottish Law Officers and deputy to the Lord Advocate, in 1874, and was elected Dean of the Faculty of Advocates in 1875. In 1876, the Lord Advocate, Edward Gordon, was appointed a Lord of Appeal in Ordinary (Lord Gordon of Drumearn) and resigned as Lord Advocate and Member of Parliament (MP) for Glasgow and Aberdeen Universities. Watson won the ensuing by-election and was appointed Lord Advocate. He was appointed a Privy Counsellor in 1878.

Watson did not stand for re-election at the 1880 general election, and was instead appointed a Lord of Appeal in Ordinary as Baron Watson, of Thankerton in the County of Lanark. As a member of the Privy Council, he was also entitled to sit on the Judicial Committee of the Privy Council.

=== Judgements ===
- Foakes v Beer [1884] UKHL 1, [1881-85] All ER Rep 106, (1884) 9 App Cas 605; 54 LJQB 130; 51 LT 833; 33 WR 233 - a leading case from the House of Lords on the legal concept of consideration
- Liquidators of the Maritime Bank of Canada v. Receiver-General of New Brunswick [1892] A.C. 437 - statement of provincial powers under the BNA Act 1867
- Cooper v Stuart (1889); the case which cemented the legal fiction of terra nullius in Australia for a century before the High Court overturned it with Mabo v Queensland (No 2) in 1992.

== Personal life ==
Watson married Margaret Bannatyne (1846-1898) in 1868, and the couple had five sons and a daughter. His son William also became a law lord as Lord Thankerton while another son, Ronald, was a first-class cricketer. Watson lived at 20 Queen's Gate in South Kensington, and was a member of the Athenæum and the Carlton Club.

He is buried in Dean Cemetery in Edinburgh against the north wall, of the Victorian north extension, near the north-west corner.

Coat of arms of William Watson, Baron Watson
Crest The stump of an oak tree with two branches sprouting from it and grasped on either side by a hand issuing from a cloud all Proper. Escutcheon Or an oak tree Proper growing out of a mount in base Vert surmounted of a fess Ermine charged with two mullets Azure. Supporters Dexter a highland deerhound Proper; sinister a lion Argent, each charged on the shoulder with a thistle slipped and leaved Proper. Motto A Deo Floruit

Parliament of the United Kingdom
Preceded by Edward Gordon	Member of Parliament for Glasgow and Aberdeen Universities; 1876–1880	Succeeded by James Alexander Campbell
Legal offices
Preceded by John Millar	Solicitor General for Scotland; 1874–1876	Succeeded by John Macdonald
Preceded by Edward Gordon	Lord Advocate; 1876–1880	Succeeded by John McLaren
