= Lewis Majendie =

British politician (1835–1885)

Lewis Ashurst Majendie (1835 – 22 October 1885) was a British Conservative Party politician.

== Parliamentary career ==
At the 1874 general election, Majendie was elected as one of the two Members of Parliament (MPs) for the parliamentary borough of Canterbury in Kent. He held the seat until his resignation in 1879, by the procedural device of accepting the post of Steward of the Chiltern Hundreds.

== Personal life ==
In 1869, Majendie married Lady Margaret Elizabeth Lindsay (1850–1912), the daughter of Alexander Lindsay, 25th Earl of Crawford and Margaret Lindsay. They lived at Hedingham Castle in Essex and had two sons and a daughter, Margaret Aline Majendie (1872–1911), who married Francis Grenfell, 1st Baron Grenfell. Majendie died on 22 October 1885.

Parliament of the United Kingdom
Preceded by Theodore Henry Brinckman; Henry Munro-Butler-Johnstone	Member of Parliament for Canterbury; 1874 – 1879; With: Henry Munro-Butler-Johnstone to 1878; Alfred Gathorne-Hardy from 1878	Succeeded by Robert Laurie; Alfred Gathorne-Hardy
