= 1873 Northern West Riding of Yorkshire by-election =

UK Parliamentary by-election

The 1873 Northern West Riding of Yorkshire by-election was fought on 27 August 1873. The by-election was fought due to the incumbent Liberal MP, Lord Frederick Cavendish, becoming Lord Commissioner of the Treasury. It was retained by Cavendish, who was unopposed.
