= Robert Peter Laurie =

British politician (1835–1905)

Robert Peter Laurie, CB VD (24 October 1835 – 29 July 1905) was a British Conservative Party politician. Laurie was educated at Tonbridge School and entered the banking business.

== Volunteer service ==
When an invasion scare in 1859 led to the rise of the Volunteer movement, Laurie joined the ranks of Queen Victoria's Rifles. One of the leaders of the movement was the journalist Alfred Bate Richards, who personally raised a 'Workmen's Brigade' in London. This unit was adopted as the 3rd City of London Rifle Volunteer Corps, and Laurie was one of the first officers commissioned, as a captain, dated 26 April 1861. He was promoted to major in 1864, and when Richards retired in 1867, Laurie succeeded him as lieutenant-colonel commandant

== Parliamentary career ==
Laurie was elected as one of the two Members of Parliament (MPs) for the parliamentary borough of Canterbury at a by-election in May 1879, following the resignation from the House of Commons of the Conservative MP Lewis Majendie. Laurie was re-elected at the 1880 general election, but the election was subsequently declared void and parliamentary representation from Canterbury was suspended until 1885.

At the 1885 general election, Laurie contested the two-seat Bath constituency. He narrowly missed winning the second seat, polling 2,971 votes against the 2,990 of the sitting Liberal MP Edmond Wodehouse.

However, when Bath's Conservative MP Robert Blaine retired at the 1886 general election, Laurie was elected in his place, and held the seat until he stood down at the 1892 general election.

During his Parliamentary career, Laurie was counted as a member of the 'Volunteer Interest' in the House of Commons.

== Later life ==
Laurie was Master of the Worshipful Company of Saddlers in 1887.

Laurie remained commanding officer of the 3rd London RVC until forced to retire due to ill-health in 1892, when he became its Honorary Colonel until 1904. He was awarded a CB in 1887 and was one of the first recipients of the Volunteer Officers' Decoration when it was instituted in 1892. His son, R.M. Laurie, and cousins K.S. Laurie, Allan D. Laurie, R.A. Laurie and Maj-Gen Sir Percy Laurie, all joined the 3rd Londons, and several went on to distinguished careers during World War I.

== Sources ==
- Ian F.W. Beckett, Riflemen Form: A study of the Rifle Volunteer Movement 1859–1908, Aldershot: Ogilby Trusts, 1982, ISBN 0 85936 271 X.
- Craig, F. W. S. (1989) [1977]. British parliamentary election results 1832–1885 (2nd ed.). Chichester: Parliamentary Research Services. ISBN 0-900178-26-4.
- Craig, F. W. S. (1989) [1974]. British parliamentary election results 1885–1918 (2nd ed.). Chichester: Parliamentary Research Services. ISBN 0-900178-27-2.
- C. Digby Planck, The Shiny Seventh: History of the 7th (City of London) Battalion London Regiment, London: Old Comrades' Association, 1946/Uckfield: Naval & Military Press, 2002, ISBN 1-84342-366-9.
- "Historical list of MPs: House of Commons constituencies beginning with "C" (part 2)". Leigh Rayment's House of Commons pages. Archived from the original on 10 August 2009.

Parliament of the United Kingdom
Preceded by Lewis Majendie; Alfred Gathorne-Hardy	Member of Parliament for Canterbury; 1879–1880; With: Alfred Gathorne-Hardy	Vacant Representation suspended Title next held by John Henniker Heaton
Preceded by Robert Blaine; Edmond Wodehouse	Member of Parliament for Bath; 1886–1892; With: Edmond Wodehouse	Succeeded by Charles Wyndham Murray; Edmond Wodehouse
