= 1875 Whitehaven by-election =

UK Parliamentary by-election

The 1875 Whitehaven by-election was fought on 16 December 1875. The by-election was fought due to the incumbent Conservative MP, George Cavendish-Bentinck, becoming Judge Advocate General. It was retained by the incumbent.

By-election, 18 Dec 1875: Whitehaven
Party	Candidate	Votes	%	±%
Conservative	George Cavendish-Bentinck	1,503	82.8	N/A
Liberal	Charles Thompson	313	17.2	New
Majority		1,190	65.6	N/A
Turnout		1,816	69.9	N/A
Registered electors		2,599		
Conservative hold		Swing	N/A	
