= 1870 Dublin City by-election =

UK Parliamentary by-election

The 1870 Dublin City by-election was fought on 18 August 1870. The by-election was fought due to the void election of the incumbent MP of the Conservative Party, Sir Arthur Edward Guinness. The election was voided because of his election agent's unlawful efforts, which the court found were unknown to the candidate.

It was won by the Liberal candidate Sir Dominic John Corrigan.

Corrigan did not stand for re-election in 1874; his support for temperance and Sunday closing (of pubs) is thought to have antagonised his constituents and alcohol companies. Guinness was re-elected in 1874.

== Result ==
By-election 1870: Dublin City
Party	Candidate	Votes	%	±%
Liberal	Dominic Corrigan	4,468	56.5	+6.7
Home Rule	Edward King-Harman	3,444	43.5	New
Majority		1,024	13.0	N/A
Turnout		7,912	61.3	−24.0
Registered electors		12,899		
Liberal gain from Conservative		Swing		
