= 1874 Falkirk Burghs by-election =

UK Parliamentary by-election

The 1874 Falkirk Burghs by-election was fought on 26 March 1874. The by-election was fought due to the disqualification of the incumbent Liberal MP, John Ramsay, who held a government contract. It was retained by Ramsay who was unopposed.
