= Dominic Corrigan =

Irish physician (1802–1880)

Sir Dominic Corrigan, Bt
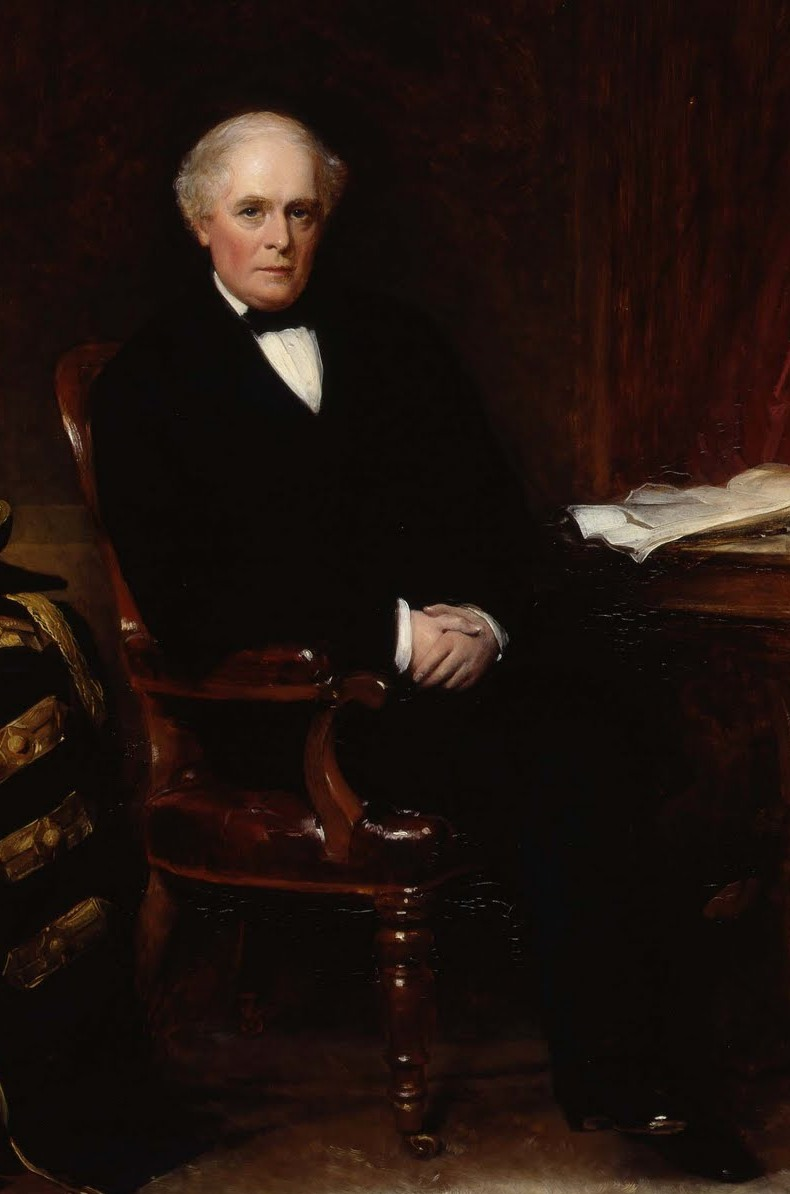
- Born: 2 December 1802; Thomas Street, Dublin, Ireland
- Died: 1 February 1880 (aged 77); Merrion Square, Dublin
- Education: St. Patrick's College, Maynooth, University of Edinburgh
- Known for: aortic valve insufficiency, Corrigan's pulse
- Scientific career
- Fields: Medicine
- Workplaces: Sick Poor Institute, Dublin, Jervis Street Hospital, House of Industry Hospitals

Sir Dominic John Corrigan, 1st Baronet (2 December 1802 – 1 February 1880), was an Irish physician, known for his original observations in heart disease. The abnormal "collapsing" pulse of aortic valve insufficiency is named Corrigan's pulse after him.

== Birth and education ==
Corrigan was born in Thomas Street, Dublin, the son of a dealer in agricultural tools. He was educated in St. Patrick's College, Maynooth, which then had a department for secular students apart from the ecclesiastical seminary. He was attracted to the study of medicine by the physician in attendance, and spent several years as an apprentice to the local doctor, Edward Talbot O'Kelly. Corrigan studied medicine in Dublin later transferring to Edinburgh Medical School where he received his degree as MD in August 1825.

== Career ==
Corrigan returned to Dublin in 1825 and set up a private practice at 11 Ormond Street, as his practice grew he moved to 12 Bachelors Walk in 1832, and in 1837 to 4 Merrion Square West. Apart from his private practice, Corrigan held many public appointments; he was a physician to Maynooth College, the Sick Poor Institute, the Charitable Infirmary Jervis Street (1830–43) and the House of Industry Hospitals (1840–1866). His work with many of Dublin's poorest inhabitants led to him specialising in diseases of the heart and lungs, and he lectured and published extensively on the subject. He was known as a very hard-working physician, especially during the Great Famine of Ireland. At a by-election in 1870 Corrigan was elected a Liberal Member of Parliament for Dublin. In parliament he actively campaigned for reforms to education in Ireland and the early release of Fenian prisoners. He did not stand for re-election in 1874; his support for temperance and Sunday closing (of pubs) is thought to have antagonised his constituents and alcohol companies.

== Honours ==
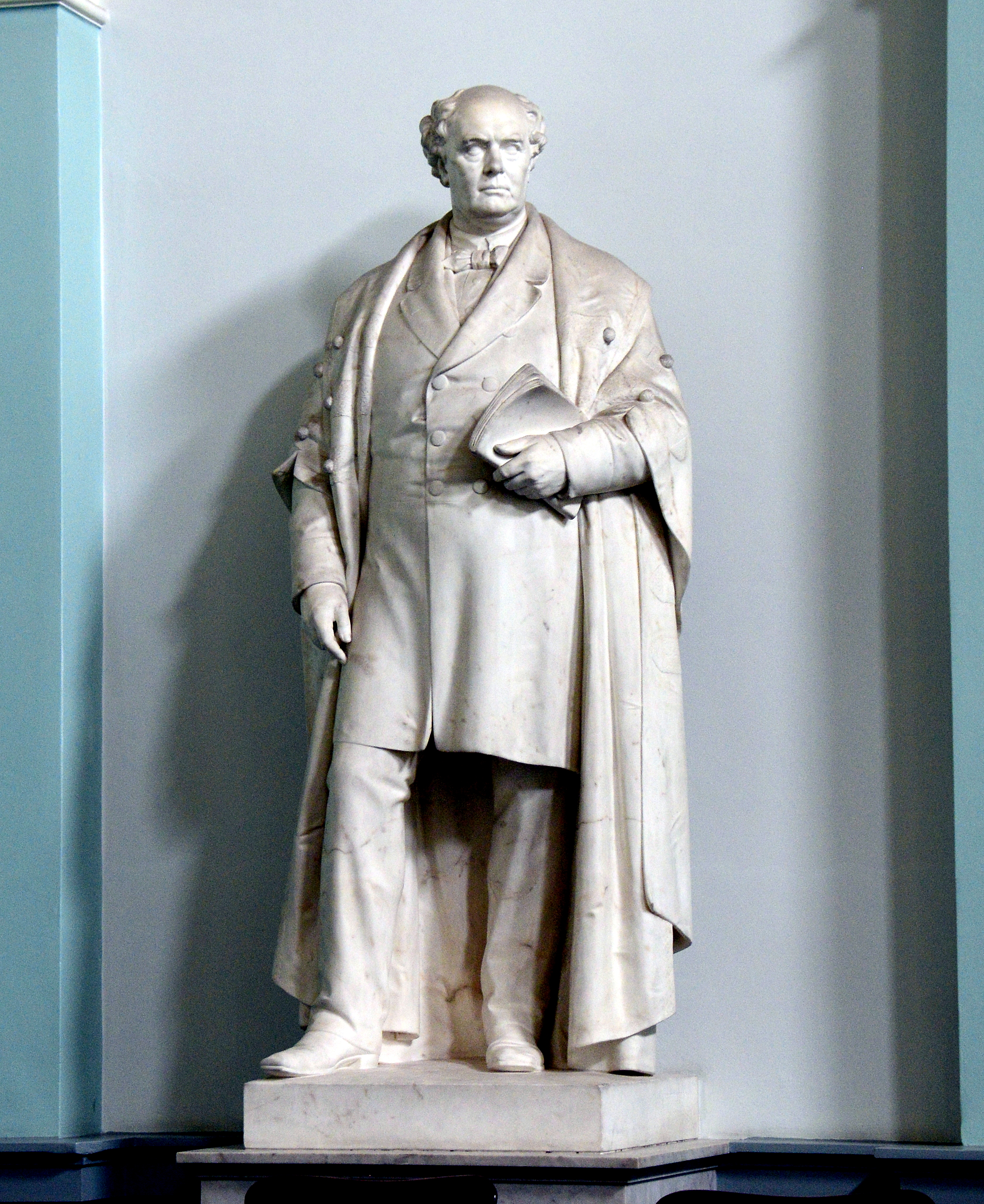
Marble statue of Dominic Corrigan at No.6 Kildare Street, the Royal College of Physicians of Ireland. Sculpted by John Henry Foley

In 1847 Corrigan was appointed physician-in-ordinary to the Queen in Ireland. Two years later he was given an honorary MD from Trinity College. In 1846 Corrigan's application to become a fellow of the Royal College of Physicians of Ireland was blocked. In 1855 he got around this opposition by sitting the college's entrance exam with the newly qualified doctors. He became a fellow in 1856, and in 1859 was elected president, the first Catholic to hold the position; he was re-elected president an unprecedented four times. There is a statue of Corrigan in the Graves' Hall of the college by John Henry Foley.

He was President of the Royal Zoological Society of Dublin, the Dublin Pathological Society, and the Dublin Pharmaceutical Society. From the 1840s he was a member of the senate of the Queen's University and in 1871 became its vice-chancellor. In 1866 he was created a baronet, of Cappagh and Inniscorrig in the County of Dublin and of Merrion Square in the City of Dublin, partly as a reward for his services as Commissioner of Education for many years. He was a member of the board of Glasnevin Cemetery and a member of the Daniel O'Connell Memorial Committee. Armand Trousseau, the French clinician, proposed that aortic heart disease should be called Corrigan's disease.

The Corrigan Ward, a cardiology ward in Beaumont Hospital, Dublin is named in his honour. Part of his family crest is also part of the Beaumont Hospital crest.

== Family and death ==
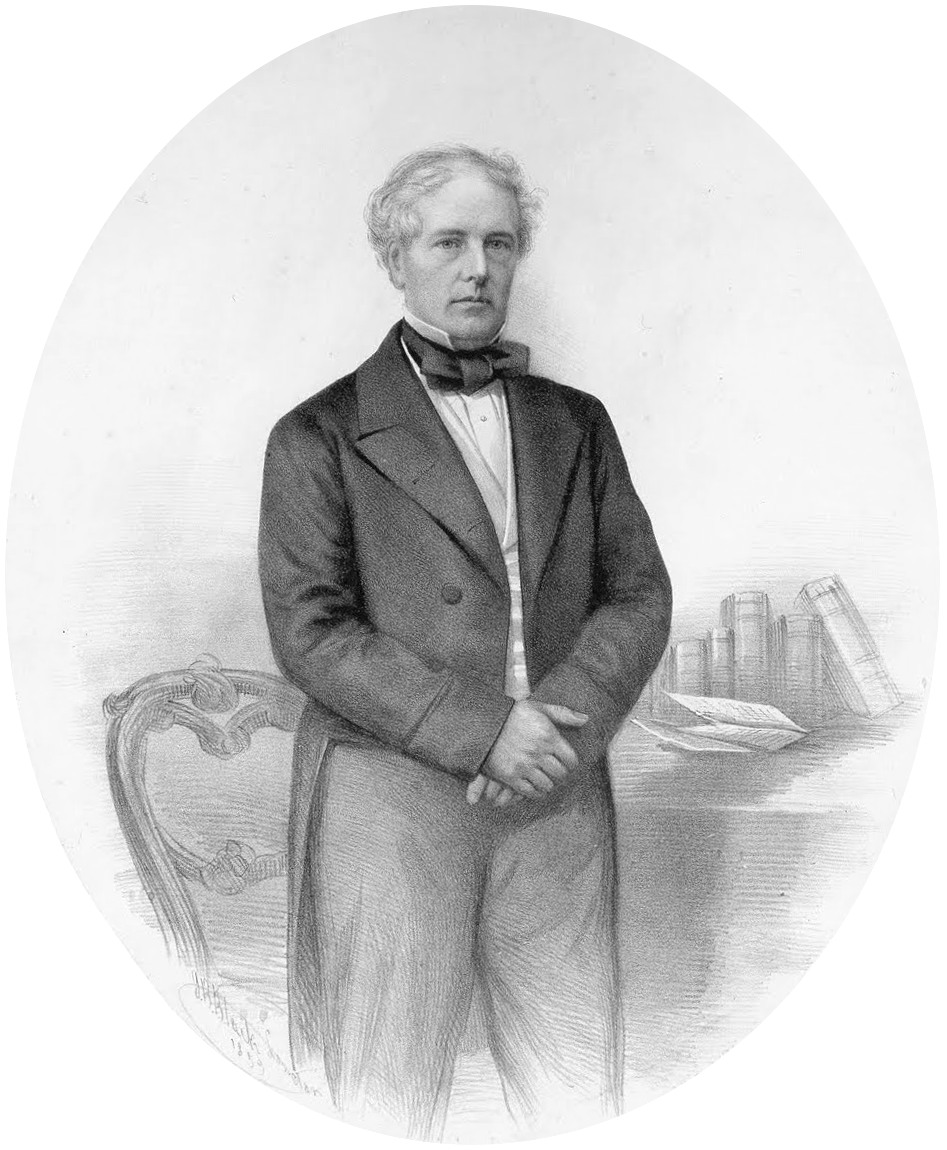
Dominic John Corrigan

Corrigan married Joanna Woodlock, the daughter of a wealthy merchant, and sister of the Bishop Dr. Bartholomew Woodlock, in 1827. They had six children, three girls and three boys. Corrigan's eldest son, Captain John Joseph CORRIGAN, Dragoon Guards, died on 6 January 1866 aged 35 years and is interred at the Melbourne General Cemetery, Melbourne, Australia. His grandson succeeded him to the baronetcy. Corrigan died at Merrion Square, Dublin, on 1 February 1880, having suffered a stroke the previous December, and is buried in the crypt of St. Andrews Church on Westland Row, Dublin.

== Arms ==
Coat of arms of Dominic Corrigan

Notes
Granted 6 March 1860 by Sir John Berard Burke, Ulster King of Arms.
Crest
A sword in pale point downwards in front thereof two battleaxes in saltire all Proper.
Escutcheon
Or a chevron between two trefoils slipped Vert in chief and a lizard in base Proper.
Motto
Consilio Et Impetu

== See also ==
- Pathology
- List of pathologists

== Bibliography ==
- R. A. L. Agnew (1 July 1965). "The Achievement of Dominic John Corrigan". Medical History. 9 (3): 230–240. doi:10.1017/s0025727300030726. PMC 1033503. PMID 14321566.
- Berry, Diana (September 2006). "History of medicine: Sir Dominic Corrigan, MD". Circulation. 114 (10): f140. PMID 16955551.
- Taylor, Mark (December 2003). "Acting the part. As HHS' interim IG, Corrigan says she's able to use every skill she's ever developed in her leading role". Modern Healthcare. 33 (48): 33–4. PMID 14666842.
- Ventura, Hector O (2003). "History of heart failure". Congestive Heart Failure. 9 (5): 293. doi:10.1111/j.1527-5299.2003.02205.x. PMID 14564149.
- Stone, J (August 1986). "Sir Dominic John Corrigan". Clinical Cardiology. 9 (8): 403–6. doi:10.1002/clc.4960090809. PMID 3524937.
- O'Brien, E (1984). "Sir Dominic Corrigan (1802–1880): doctor and parliamentarian". Studies. 73 (290): 146–58. PMID 11636081.
- O'Brien, E T (February 1981). "The man behind the eponym: Sir Dominic John Corrigan (1802—1880)". N. Engl. J. Med. 304 (6): 365–6. doi:10.1056/NEJM198102053040629. PMID 7003395.
- O'Brien, E (1980). "The Lancet maketh the man? Sir Dominic John Corrigan (1802—80)". Lancet. 2 (8208–8209): 1356–7. doi:10.1016/S0140-6736(80)92414-9. PMID 6109167. S2CID 22750594.

Attribution

- Cites:
  - Sketches in the British Medical Journal and The Lancet (1880);
  - Walsh, Makers of Modern Medicine (New York, 1907).

Parliament of the United Kingdom
Preceded by Arthur Guinness; Jonathan Pim	Member of Parliament for Dublin; 1870–1874; With: Jonathan Pim	Succeeded by Maurice Brooks; Arthur Guinness
Baronetage of the United Kingdom
New creation	Baronet (of Cappagh, Inniscorrig and Merrion Square); 1866–1880	Succeeded by John Joseph Corrigan
