= 1874 North Devonshire by-election =

UK Parliamentary by-election

The 1874 North Devonshire by-election was fought on 18 March 1874. The by-election was fought due to the incumbent Conservative MP, Sir Stafford Northcote, becoming Chancellor of the Exchequer. It was retained by the incumbent.
