= 1869 Glasgow and Aberdeen Universities by-election =

UK parliamentary by-election

The 1869 Glasgow and Aberdeen Universities by-election was fought on 22 November 1869. The by-election was fought due to the resignation of the incumbent MP of the Liberal Party, James Moncreiff, to become a Lord Justice Clerk. It was won by the Conservative candidate Edward Strathearn Gordon.
