= 1874 South Devonshire by-election =

UK Parliamentary by-election

The 1874 South Devonshire by-election was fought on 19 March 1874. The byelection was fought due to the incumbent Conservative MP, Sir Massey Lopes, becoming Civil Lord of the Admiralty. It was retained by the incumbent.
