= Henry Munro-Butler-Johnstone =

Henry Alexander Munro-Butler-Johnstone (7 December 1837 – 17 October 1902) was a British author and Conservative Party politician.

Born as Henry Alexander Butler-Johnstone, he was the son of Henry Butler-Johnstone (himself born Hon. Henry Butler), a younger son of the 13th Baron Dunboyne, by his wife Isabella Margaret Munro, daughter of Sir Alexander Munro. His father took the surname Butler-Johnstone to honour an inheritance from his wife's uncle, and he himself took the additional surname Munro from his mother in 1874.

He was educated at Eton and at Christ Church, Oxford, graduating in 1861 with a first-class Bachelor of Arts degree in classics. In 1862 he was elected Member of Parliament for Canterbury, a position he resigned in 1878. From 1868 he sat as an independent. He was also Deputy Lieutenant for Ross-shire, and in 1875 published the book The Eastern Question.

He died in Paris on 17 October 1902. In 1909 his body was cremated and his ashes transferred to England, where he was buried.

== Family ==
Munro-Butler-Johnstone married in 1877 Maria Irina Gabriella, Countess de Soyres, who died in 1880. He remarried in December 1896 Mrs. Skipp Lloyd, widow of Joseph Skipp Lloyd, formerly Clerk of the Cheque and Adjutant of the Honourable Corps of Gentlemen at Arms.

Parliament of the United Kingdom
| Preceded by Sir William Somerville; Henry Butler-Johnstone | Member of Parliament for Canterbury; 1862–1878; With: Sir William Somerville 1862–1865; John Walter Huddleston 1865–1868; Theodore Brinckman 1868–1874; Lewis Ashurst Majendie 1874–1878 | Succeeded by Lewis Ashurst Majendie; Alfred Gathorne-Hardy |
