= Edward Gordon, Baron Gordon of Drumearn =

Scottish judge and politician (1814–1879)

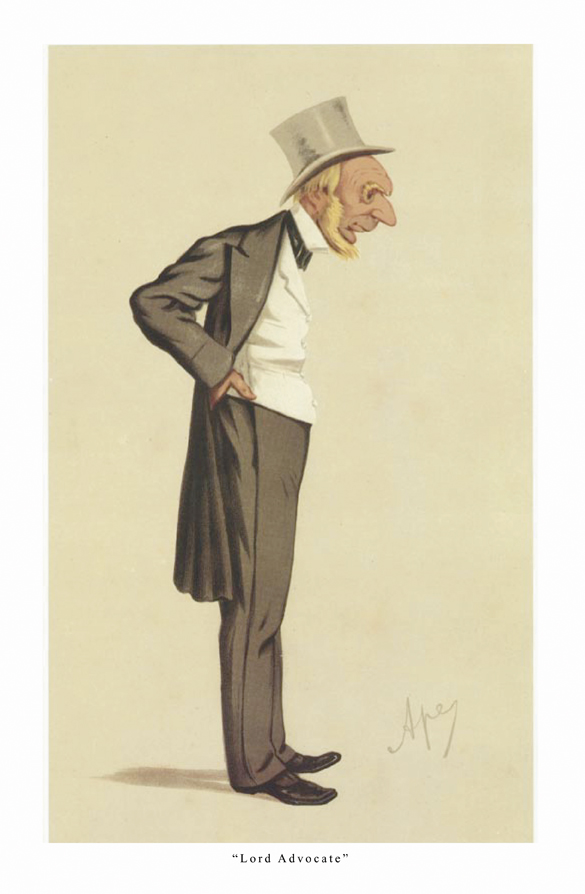
"Lord Advocate" Gordon as caricatured by Ape (Carlo Pellegrini) in Vanity Fair, October 1874

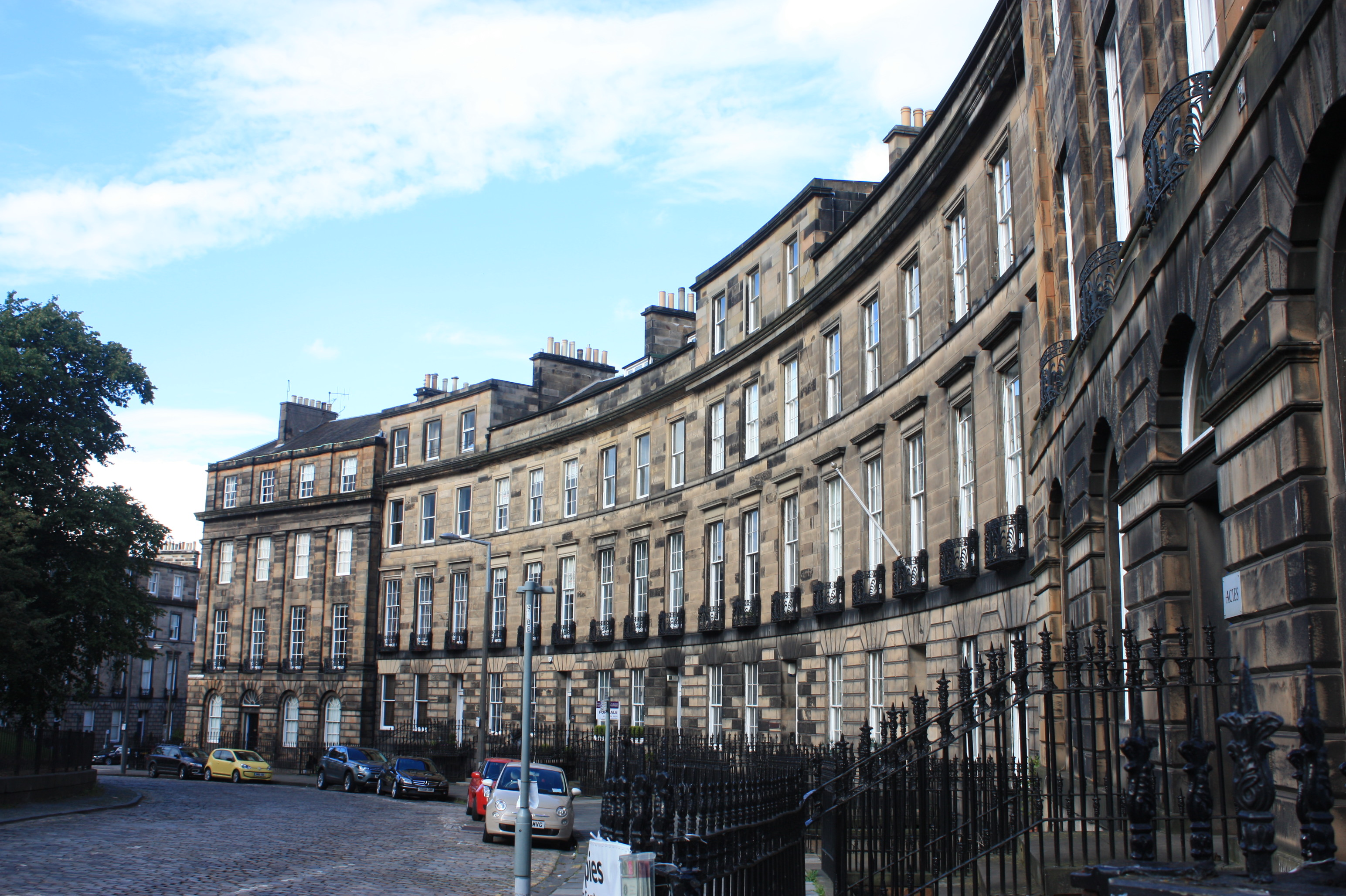
1 to 7 Randolph Crescent, Edinburgh

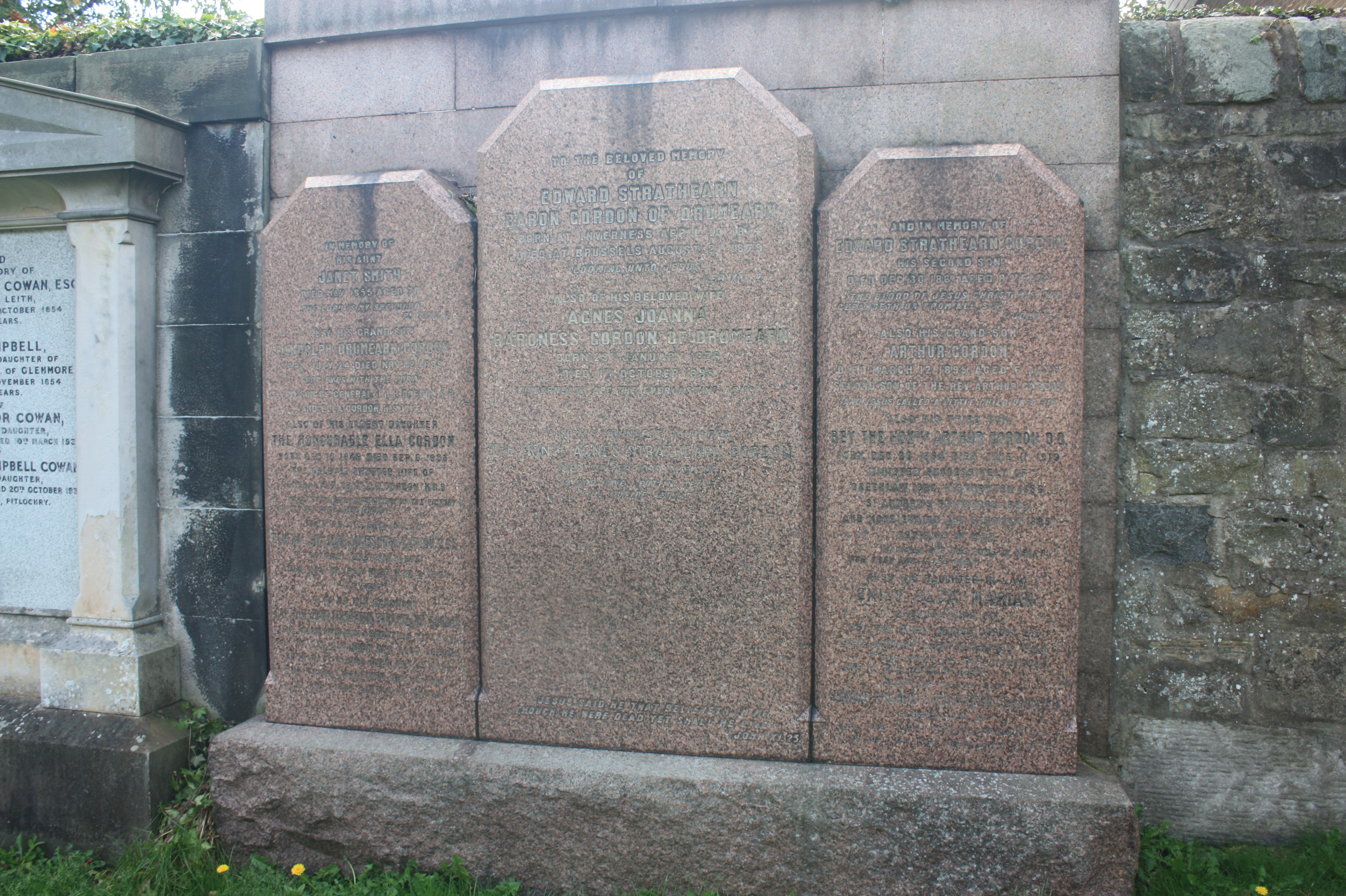
Baron Gordon's monument, Dean Cemetery, Edinburgh

Edward Strathearn Gordon, Baron Gordon of Drumearn, PC (10 April 1814 – 21 August 1879) was a Scottish judge and politician.

== Early life and education ==
Gordon was born on 10 April 1814. He was educated at Inverness Royal Academy, Royal High School, Edinburgh, the University of Glasgow and the University of Edinburgh.

== Career ==
He was called to the Scottish bar in 1835. He was appointed Sheriff of Perth for 1858 to 1866, Solicitor General for Scotland from 1866 to 1867, and Lord Advocate from 1867 to 1868 and again from 1874 to 1876. He was Dean of the Faculty of Advocates from 1868 to 1874. He became a Queen's Counsel in 1868, and was appointed a Privy Counsellor in 1874. He was a made a Law Life Peer in 1876 as Baron Gordon of Drumearn, in the County of Stirling, and sat as a Lord of Appeal from 1876 to 1879.

He was the Conservative Member of Parliament for Thetford from 1867 to 1868 and for Glasgow and Aberdeen Universities from 1869 to 1876.

== Personal life ==
In 1845, Gordon married Agnes MacInnes. Together they had seven children, including Frederick Gordon. Their daughter Ella married in 1871 John James Hood Gordon.

As of 1874–75, he lived at 2 Randolph Crescent on the edge of the Moray Estate in western Edinburgh.

He died in Brussels while travelling to Homburg for his health and is buried with his family against the original north boundary wall of Dean Cemetery in Edinburgh.

== Sources ==
- Who Was Who
- Hesilrige, Arthur G. M. (1921). Debrett's Peerage and Titles of courtesy. 160A, Fleet street, London, UK: Dean & Son. p. 408.

Parliament of the United Kingdom
Preceded by Alexander Baring; Robert Harvey	Member of Parliament for Thetford; 1867–1868; With: Robert Harvey	Constituency abolished
Preceded by James Moncreiff	Member of Parliament for Glasgow and Aberdeen Universities; 1869–1876	Succeeded by William Watson
Legal offices
Preceded by George Young	Solicitor General for Scotland; 1866–1867	Succeeded by John Millar
Preceded by George Patton	Lord Advocate; 1867–1868	Succeeded by James Moncreiff
Preceded by George Young	Lord Advocate; 1874	Succeeded by William Watson
