= Alfred Gathorne-Hardy =

British politician (1845–1918)

The Honourable Alfred Gathorne-Hardy JP DL

Member of Parliament for Canterbury
- In office 1878–1880
- Preceded by: Henry Munro-Butler-Johnstone; Lewis Majendie
- Succeeded by: John Henniker Heaton

Member of Parliament for East Grinstead
- In office 1886–1895
- Preceded by: George Gregory
- Succeeded by: George Goschen

Personal details
- Born: Alfred Erskine Hardy; 27 February 1845
- Died: 11 November 1918 (aged 73)
- Spouse: Isabella Malcolm (m. 1875)
- Children: 3, including Geoffrey
- Parent(s): Gathorne Gathorne-Hardy, 1st Earl of Cranbrook; Jane Stewart Orr

Alfred Erskine Gathorne-Hardy, JP, DL (27 February 1845 – 11 November 1918) was a British Conservative politician, landowner, and writer.

Born Alfred Erskine Hardy, he was the third son of Gathorne Gathorne-Hardy, 1st Earl of Cranbrook, and Jane Stewart Orr. He assumed by Royal licence the additional surname of Gathorne in 1878 like the rest of his family. The same year he was elected to the House of Commons for Canterbury, a seat he held until 1880, when the constituency was suspended. He returned to Parliament in 1886 when he was returned for East Grinstead, and continued to represent this constituency until 1895. He held the office of Commissioner of Railways and Canals in 1905.

An observant naturalist he was also a keen shot and fisherman. In 1900, Longmans published his Autumns in Argyle with Rod and Gun, which is a collection of reminiscences of 30 years worth of sporting visits to his brother-in-law's estate at Poltalloch in Argyll. This 100,000-acre (400 km^{2}) estate included historic Dunadd as well as Castle Sween, Carnasserie Castle, and Duntrune - the family seat of the Clan Malcolm. The book has recently been reissued in a facsimile edition. In 1910, Longmans also published his memoir of his father Lord Cranbrook, titled Gathorne Hardy, First Earl of Cranbrook: A Memoir with extracts from his diary and correspondence.

He had married in 1875 to Isabella Louisa Malcolm, the daughter of John Malcolm, 14th of Poltalloch and Isabella Wingfield, a granddaughter of Viscount Powerscourt, and a sister of John Malcolm, 1st Baron Malcolm of Poltalloch. They had three children, including the writers Geoffrey Malcolm Gathorne-Hardy and Capt. Alfred Cecil Gathorne-Hardy (1881–1915), who predeceased his father, being killed during the First World War. He was also the author of a work on natural history published in 1916, titled The Touch of a Vanished Hand.

Gathorne-Hardy died in November 1918, aged 73.

== Notes ==
Parliament of the United Kingdom
Preceded by Henry Munro-Butler-Johnstone; Lewis Majendie	Member of Parliament for Canterbury; 1878 – 1880; With: Lewis Majendie 1878–1879; Robert Peter Laurie 1879–1880	Vacant Representation suspended Title next held by John Henniker Heaton
Preceded by George Gregory	Member of Parliament for East Grinstead; 1886 – 1895	Succeeded by George Goschen
