= List of United Kingdom parliamentary constituencies in Ireland 1801–1885 =

List of parliamentary constituencies in Ireland 1801–1885

Under the Acts of Union 1800, with effect from 1 January 1801, there were a 100 MPs representing Ireland in the United Kingdom Parliament. These were divided into 66 constituencies for elections to the United Kingdom Parliament, specified as "two for each County of Ireland, two for the City of Dublin, two for the City of Cork, one for the University of Trinity College, and one for each of the thirty-one most considerable Cities, Towns, and Boroughs":

- 32 county constituencies, each electing 2 MPs;
- 33 borough constituencies, each electing 1 MP, except for Cork City and Dublin City, which elected 2 MPs; and
- 1 university constituency, electing 1 MP.

This distribution remained substantively in place until 1885, subject to the following alterations:

- Representation of the People (Ireland) Act 1832: the total number of seats from Ireland increased to 105, with the boroughs of Belfast, Galway, Limerick, Waterford, and Dublin University gaining a second seat.
- Parliamentary Boundaries (Ireland) Act 1832: minor boundary changes to the borough constituencies.
- Representation of the People (Ireland) Act 1868: in the case of boroughs retained under the Municipal Corporations (Ireland) Act 1840, boundaries of parliamentary boroughs extended to include the whole municipal borough.
- Sligo and Cashel Disfranchisement Act 1870: the boroughs of Cashel and Sligo were disfranchised for corruption, reducing the number of constituencies to 64 and seats to 103.

In the Redistribution of Seats Act 1885, there was a substantial revision of constituencies, taking a greater account of changes to the population. Most borough constituencies were abolished and county constituencies were divided into single-member districts. These new constituencies were first used at the 1885 United Kingdom general election in Ireland.

== List of constituencies ==
*: Disfranchised in 1870.

Constituency	Type	County	Seats	
Constituency	Type	County	1801	1832
County Antrim	County	County Antrim	2	
County Armagh	County	County Armagh	2	
Armagh	Borough	County Armagh	1	
Athlone	Borough	County Westmeath	1	
Bandon	Borough	County Cork	1	
Belfast	Borough	County Antrim	1	2
County Carlow	County	County Carlow	2	
Carlow	Borough	County Carlow	1	
Carrickfergus	Borough	County Antrim	1	
Cashel	Borough	County Tipperary	1	
County Cavan	County	County Cavan	2	
County Clare	County	County Clare	2	
Clonmel	Borough	County Tipperary	1	
Coleraine	Borough	County Londonderry	1	
County Cork	County	County Cork	2	
Cork	Borough	County Cork	2	
County Donegal	County	County Donegal	2	
County Down	County	County Down	2	
Downpatrick	Borough	County Down	1	
Drogheda	Borough	County Louth	1	
County Dublin	County	County Dublin	2	
Dublin	Borough	County Dublin	2	
Dublin University	University	County Dublin	1	2
Dundalk	Borough	County Louth	1	
Dungannon	Borough	County Tyrone	1	
Dungarvan	Borough	County Waterford	1	
Ennis	Borough	County Clare	1	
Enniskillen	Borough	County Fermanagh	1	
County Fermanagh	County	County Fermanagh	2	
County Galway	County	County Galway	2	
Galway	Borough	County Galway	1	2
County Kerry	County	County Kerry	2	
County Kildare	County	County Kildare	2	
County Kilkenny	County	County Kilkenny	2	
Kilkenny	Borough	County Kilkenny	1	
King's County	County	King's County	2	
Kinsale	Borough	County Cork	1	
County Leitrim	County	County Leitrim	2	
County Limerick	County	County Limerick	2	
Limerick	Borough	County Limerick	1	2
Lisburn	Borough	County Antrim	1	
County Londonderry	County	County Londonderry	2	
Londonderry	Borough	County Londonderry	1	
County Longford	County	County Longford	2	
County Louth	County	County Louth	2	
Mallow	Borough	County Cork	1	
County Mayo	County	County Mayo	2	
County Meath	County	County Meath	2	
County Monaghan	County	County Monaghan	2	
New Ross	Borough	County Wexford	1	
Newry	Borough	County Down	1	
Portarlington	Borough	Queen's County	1	
Queen's County	County	Queen's County	2	
County Roscommon	County	County Roscommon	2	
County Sligo	County	County Sligo	2	
Sligo	Borough	County Sligo	1	
County Tipperary	County	County Tipperary	2	
Tralee	Borough	County Kerry	1	
County Tyrone	County	County Tyrone	2	
County Waterford	County	County Waterford	2	
Waterford	Borough	County Waterford	1	2
County Westmeath	County	County Westmeath	2	
County Wexford	County	County Wexford	2	
Wexford	Borough	County Wexford	1	
County Wicklow	County	County Wicklow	2	
Youghal	Borough	County Cork	1	

== Map of boroughs ==
2 seats · 1 seat (1801–32); 2 seats (1832–85) · 1 seat

== See also ==
- List of United Kingdom Parliament constituencies in Ireland and Northern Ireland
