= William Felix Munster =

William Felix Munster MP

Member of Parliament for Mallow
- In office 7 June 1872 – 31 January 1874
- Preceded by: George Waters
- Succeeded by: John George MacCarthy

Personal details
- Born: 1849
- Died: 11 April 1877 (aged 27) St. Louis, Missouri, United States
- Party: Liberal
- Spouse: Blanche Lynch
- Parent: Henry Munster

William Felix Laurence Austin Munster (1849 – 11 April 1877) was an Irish Liberal Party politician.

He was elected as the Member of Parliament (MP) for Mallow at a by-election in 1872 but did not stand again at the next general election in 1874.

Parliament of the United Kingdom
| Preceded by George Waters | Member of Parliament for Mallow; 1872 – 1874 | Succeeded by John George MacCarthy |
