= Richard Armstrong (politician) =

Irish Liberal politician and barrister

Richard Armstrong QC
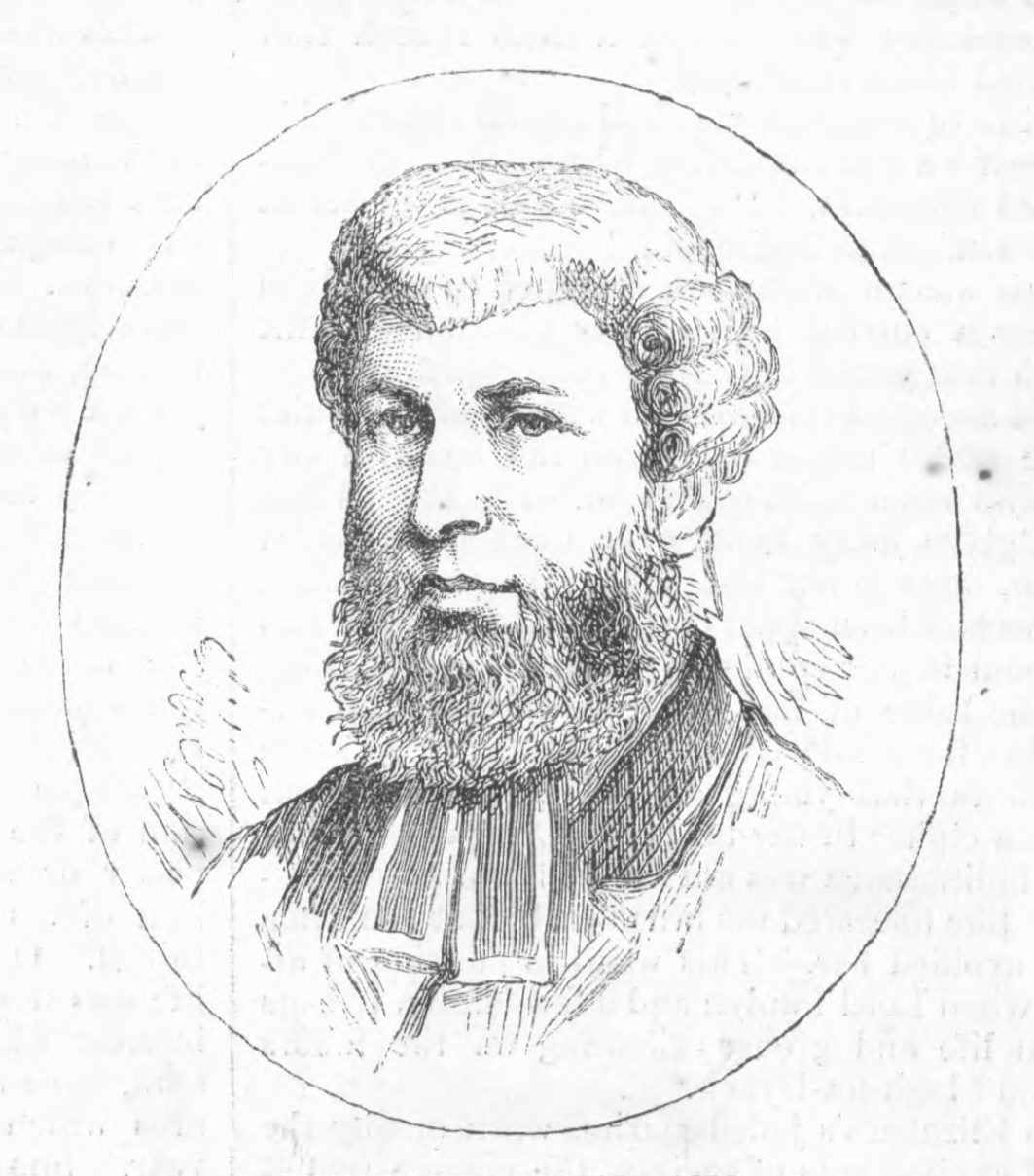

Member of Parliament for Sligo
- In office 15 July 1865 – 20 November 1868
- Preceded by: Francis Macdonogh
- Succeeded by: Lawrence E. Knox

Personal details
- Born: 10 May 1815 County Armagh, Ireland
- Died: 26 August 1880 (aged 65)
- Party: Liberal
- Spouse: Elizabeth Meurant
- Children: William, Lily
- Parent(s): William Armstrong; Eliza Armstrong (née Steacy).
- Education: Trinity College Dublin

Richard Armstrong QC (1815 – 26 August 1880) was an Irish Liberal politician, and barrister.

He was the son of William Armstrong, an engineer by profession, of Roxborough, County Armagh, and his wife Eliza Armstrong (née Steacy).

After graduating in law from Trinity College Dublin, Armstrong was called to the bar in 1839 and then, in 1854, became Queen's Counsel.

He was considered one of the finest Irish advocates of his time, with numerous courtroom triumphs to his credit, most notably the Yelverton case.

Armstrong was elected MP as a Liberal candidate for Sligo in the 1865 general election. He did not contest the 1868.

He was the First Serjeant-at-law of Ireland from 1866 until his death, having previously served as Third Serjeant from 1861 to 1865, and briefly as Second Serjeant in 1865. A very tall man, he was nicknamed "the Big Serjeant" while his diminutive colleague Sir Edward Sullivan, 1st Baronet was "the Little Serjeant".

Armstrong married Elizabeth Meurant in 1847, and they had at least one son, William Armstrong BL (1848–1899) who married Alice Arundel, and one daughter, Lily (1952–1931) who befriended John Ruskin while she attended Winnington Hall. She was the subject of a watercolour by him, and was a lily in his book Lilies and Sesame: the Ethics of Dust. Lily married Lt. William T. S. Kevill-Davies.

Parliament of the United Kingdom
Preceded by Francis Macdonogh	Member of Parliament for Sligo; 1865 – 1868	Succeeded by Lawrence E. Knox
