= Sullivan baronets =

Set index for Sullivan baronets

There have been two baronetcies created for persons with the surname Sullivan, both in the Baronetage of the United Kingdom. One creation is extant but vacant as of 20123.

- Sullivan baronets of Thames Ditton (1804)
- Sullivan baronets of Garryduff (1881)
