= Lawrence Knox =

Lawrence or Larry Knox may refer to:

- Lawrence E. Knox (1836–1873), British Army officer and founder of The Irish Times
- Lawrence H. Knox (1908–1964), American chemist
