= Sir Sullivan =

Sir Sullivan may refer to:

- Arthur Sullivan, English composer
- Sir Edward Sullivan, 1st Baronet, Irish lawyer
