= George Waters (MP) =

George Waters (25 July 1827 – 21 April 1905) was an Irish Liberal Party politician. He served as the member of parliament (MP) for Mallow, County Cork, from 1870 to 1872. He resigned to become Chairman of the Quarter-Sessions for Waterford. He resigned his position in 1892.

Educated at Trinity College Dublin, he was called to the Bar in 1849, and appointed a Queen's Counsel in 1869.

Parliament of the United Kingdom
Preceded by Henry Munster	Member of Parliament for Mallow; 1870–1872	Succeeded by William Felix Munster
