= John George MacCarthy =

Irish Rule League Politician

John George MacCarthy MP

Member of Parliament for Mallow
- In office 31 January 1874 – 31 March 1880
- Preceded by: William Felix Munster
- Succeeded by: William Moore Johnson

Personal details
- Born: June 1829 Cork City, Ireland
- Died: 1892 (aged 62–63)
- Party: Home Rule

John George MacCarthy (1829–1892) was an Irish Home Rule League politician.

He first stood for election for Mallow at a by-election in 1872, but was unsuccessful. He was then elected for the seat at the next general election in 1874.

Parliament of the United Kingdom
Preceded by William Felix Munster	Member of Parliament for Mallow; 1874 – 1880	Succeeded by William Moore Johnson
