= 1869 Mallow by-election =

UK parliamentary by-election

The 1869 Mallow by-election was contested on 4 January 1869. The by-election was held because the incumbent Liberal MP, Edward Sullivan, became Attorney General for Ireland. It was retained by Sullivan who was unopposed.
