= Robert Longfield (MP) =

Irish barrister and politician

Robert Longfield QC

Member of Parliament for Mallow
- In office 6 May 1859 – 13 July 1865
- Preceded by: Denham Jephson-Norreys
- Succeeded by: Edward Sullivan

Personal details
- Born: 1810
- Died: 27 April 1868 (aged 57–58)
- Party: Conservative

Robert Longfield QC (1810 – 27 April 1868) was an Irish barrister and a Conservative Party politician.

After unsuccessfully contesting County Cork at the 1841 general election, Longfield was elected as the Member of Parliament (MP) for Mallow at the 1859 general election, and held the seat until 1865 when he did not seek re-election.

He was the author of four legal texts, relating to various aspects of Irish property law; two written before he was elected as an MP, and two published as his Parliamentary career drew to a close: A Treatise on the Action of Ejectment in the Superior Courts of Ireland (1840); The Law of Distress and Replevin in Ireland (1841); The Fishery Laws of Ireland (1863); The Game Laws of Ireland (1864).

Parliament of the United Kingdom
Preceded by Denham Jephson-Norreys	Member of Parliament for Mallow; 1859–1865	Succeeded by Edward Sullivan
