= Bell baronets of Mynthurst (1909) =

Escutcheon of the Bell baronets of Mynthurst

The Bell baronetcy, of Mynthurst in the Parish of Leigh in the County of Surrey, was created in the Baronetage of the United Kingdom on 25 November 1909 for Henry Bell, chairman of the Buenos Aires Western Railway and director of the Buenos Aires Great Southern Railway. The title became extinct on the death of the 2nd Baronet in 1955.

== Bell baronets, of Mynthurst (1909) ==
- Sir Henry Bell, 1st Baronet (1848–1931)
- Sir Eastman Bell, MC, 2nd Baronet (1884–1955).

== Notes ==
Baronetage of the United Kingdom
Preceded by Johnson baronets	Bell baronets of Mynthurst; 25 November 1909	Succeeded by Horsfall baronets
