= John Patrick Somers =

John Somers

Member of Parliament for Sligo
- In office 2 April 1857 – 31 July 1857
- Preceded by: John Arthur Wynne
- Succeeded by: John Arthur Wynne
- In office 15 July 1848 – 15 July 1852
- Preceded by: Charles Towneley
- Succeeded by: Charles Towneley
- In office 5 August 1837 – 27 March 1848
- Preceded by: John Martin
- Succeeded by: Charles Towneley

Personal details
- Born: 1791
- Died: 1862 (aged 61)
- Party: Liberal
- Other political affiliations: Whig; Repeal Association

John Patrick Somers (1791–1862) was an Irish Liberal, Repeal Association and Whig politician.

== Political career ==
Somers was first elected MP as a Whig candidate for Sligo in the 1837 general election, and was re-elected several times, including in 1841 when he stood as a Repeal Association candidate. His term was brought to an end in March 1848, when the result of the 1847 general election in which he had been elected unopposed was overturned, as he did not possess the required property qualifications, and he was unseated.

At the resulting by-election in April, Somers again stood as a Repeal Association candidate, but was defeated by the Liberal Charles Towneley. But this election too was overturned, due to Towneley being guilty of treating, and at the next by-election in July, Somers was again re-elected as a Repeal Association candidate. Yet, standing as a Whig at the following general election in 1852 he was again defeated by Towneley, in an election which was again overturned due to bribery on both sides. At the ensuing by-election in July 1853, Somers stood as a Liberal candidate but was defeated by the opposing Liberal John Sadleir.

Nevertheless, Somers persisted, standing unsuccessfully at the 1857 by-election caused by Sadleir's death, when he was beaten by the Conservative candidate, John Arthur Wynne. Somers was finally returned to Parliament at the 1857 general election, only for this result to be overturned with the vote numbers revised after several electors, including the Mayor of Sligo, was refused a vote. The revisited results put his opponent, Wynne, one vote ahead, and Somers was again unseated in July 1857, almost four months after the general election.

While Somers attempted to regain the seat in 1859 and 1860, he was ultimately unsuccessful and then retired from politics.

== Other activities ==
Somers was part of the provisional committee of the Irish West Coast Railway, joining in 1845. He was also a Justice of the Peace for County Sligo.

Parliament of the United Kingdom
Preceded by John Arthur Wynne	Member of Parliament for Sligo; April 1857 – July 1857	Succeeded by John Arthur Wynne
Preceded by Charles Towneley	Member of Parliament for Sligo; 1848 – 1852	Succeeded by Charles Towneley
Preceded by John Martin	Member of Parliament for Sligo; 1837 – 1848	Succeeded by Charles Towneley
