= John Martin (Irish politician) =

Irish politician, died 1846

John Martin (died 28 February 1846) was an Irish politician.

Born in the Cleveragh area of Sligo, Martin came from a wealthy family of merchants, and was the son of Abraham Martin. John stood in Sligo at the 1832 general election, winning a seat for the Whigs. He held his seat in the 1835 general election, but was defeated in 1837. He and James Emerson Tennent were the only two liberal Irish MPs to support Robert Peel's ministry. Martin later served as a deputy lieutenant of County Sligo. He died in 1846, having never married.

Parliament of the United Kingdom
Preceded by John Arthur Wynne	Member of Parliament for Sligo; 1832–1835	Succeeded by John Patrick Somers
