= William Moore Johnson =

Irish politician, barrister and judge

- In The Sketch, 4 November 1896
- Born: 1828
- Died: 9 December 1918 (aged 94–95); Dublin, Ireland
- Education: Trinity College Dublin
- Occupations: Politician, barrister, judge
- Spouse: Susan Bayly (m. 1884)

Sir William Moore Johnson, 1st Baronet, KC, PC (1828 – 9 December 1918) was an Irish politician, barrister and judge. He was held in great affection by the Bar, despite a reputation for obtuseness which led to his nickname "Wooden-headed Billy". He was described as "a monument of kindness and stupidity".

He was the son of Rev. William Johnson, chancellor of the Diocese of Cloyne, and his wife Elizabeth Hamilton, daughter of the Rev. William Hamilton, Fellow of Trinity College Dublin. He was educated at Trinity College Dublin, entered Lincoln's Inn in 1849, and was called to the Irish Bar four years later. In 1872, he became a Queen's Counsel.

He was elected as a Liberal Member of Parliament (MP) for Mallow in County Cork in 1880, and held the seat until 1883. He also served as Solicitor General for Ireland from 1880 to 1881. In 1881, he was sworn a member of the Privy Council of Ireland and made Attorney General for Ireland. He remained Attorney General until 1883, when he was appointed a Justice of the Queen's Bench Division of the High Court of Justice in Ireland. He married Susan, daughter of Richard Bayly of Green Park, Kilmallock, the following year.

According to Maurice Healy, Johnson did not wish to become a judge (largely because Irish judges were rather poorly paid). However, as Attorney General, he caused a furore when, on arriving in Court to prosecute Maurice's uncle Tim Healy, he publicly shook his hand, and the Crown felt that it would be better if he ceased to be a Law Officer.

As a judge he was notorious for his inability to get the facts of a case right, leading to the nickname "Wooden-headed Billy". Maurice Healy however adds that he was a fairly good lawyer and the kindest-hearted of men. In an era when many Irish judges, such as Hugh Holmes, Walter Boyd and William Drennan Andrews were noted for the severity of their sentences in criminal cases, Johnson was noted for his clemency.

At the Wexford assize in 1897, he expressed his horror at the brutal murder of James Kelly, a prosperous farmer from Kilcavan, the previous month. He told the grand jury that he would not comment on the case in detail since there had been no arrest. In fact, no arrest was ever made and the murder remains unsolved to this day.

He was created a Baronet (of Dublin) in the Baronetage of the United Kingdom on 24 November 1909 after his retirement from the court that year. He died at his home in Dublin on 9 December 1918, and the title became extinct on his death.

== Arms ==
Coat of arms of William Moore Johnson
Notes Confirmed by Nevile Wilkinson, Ulster King of Arms, 15 November 1909. Crest A spur Or leathered Gules between two wings erect Pean. Torse Argent and Sable. Escutcheon Argent a saltire Pean on a chief embattled Gules a portcullis Or between two cushions Ermine tasselled Gold. Motto Nunquam Non Paratus

Parliament of the United Kingdom
Preceded by John George MacCarthy	Member of Parliament for Mallow; 1880–1883	Succeeded by William O'Brien
Legal offices
Preceded by Hugh Holmes	Solicitor General for Ireland; 1880–1881	Succeeded by Andrew Marshall Porter
Preceded by Hugh Law	Attorney General for Ireland; 1881–1883	Succeeded by Andrew Marshall Porter
Baronetage of the United Kingdom
New creation	Baronet (of Dublin); 1909–1919	Extinct
Preceded by Gibson baronets	Johnson baronets of Regent Terrace; 23 November 1909	Succeeded by Bell baronets
