= Charles Towneley (MP) =

English Gentleman and politician

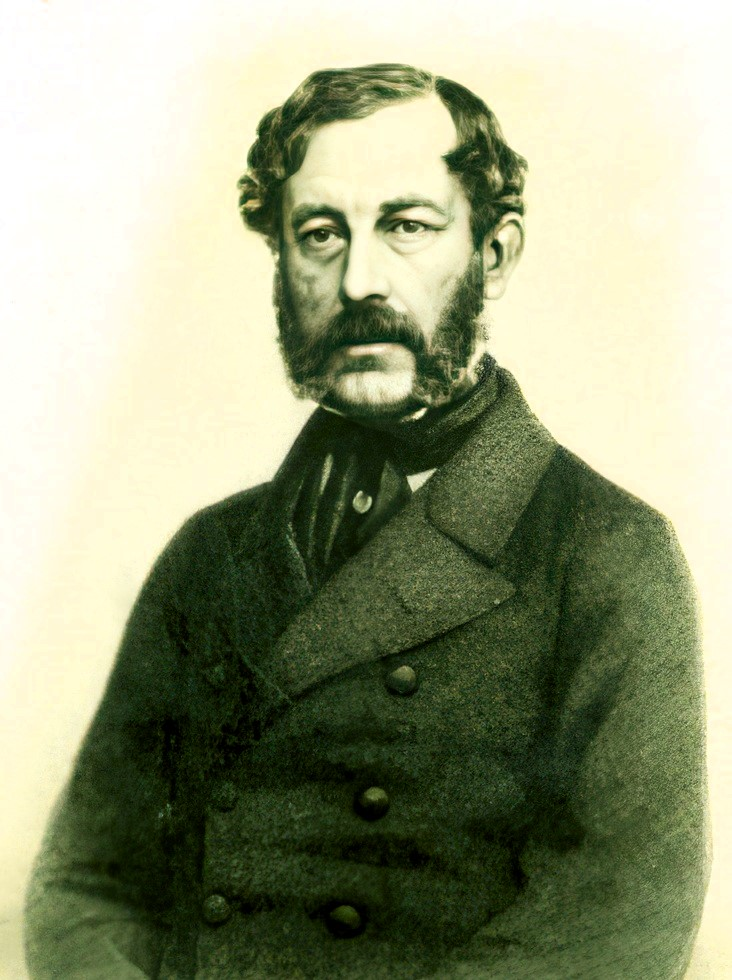
- Charles Towneley c. 1860

Member of Parliament for Sligo
- In office 15 July 1852 – 6 June 1853
- Preceded by: John Patrick Somers
- Succeeded by: John Sadleir
- In office 11 April 1848 – 26 June 1848
- Preceded by: John Patrick Somers
- Succeeded by: John Patrick Somers

Personal details
- Born: January 1803
- Died: 5 November 1876 (aged 73)
- Party: Independent Irish Party
- Other political affiliations: Whig

Colonel Charles Towneley JP DL FRS FSA (January 1803 – 5 November 1876) was a wealthy English Gentleman from an old Roman Catholic Lancashire family. He entered the United Kingdom parliament in pre-independence Ireland for the Whig Party and Independent Irish Party, and later commanded the 5th Royal Lancashire Militia.

== Early life ==
Born in January 1803, he was the eldest son of Peregrine Edward Towneley (1762–1846) of Towneley Hall, Burnley and Charlotte Drummond. His eldest sister Charlotte died, aged 20, in January 1818. Another elder sister, Frances, married Thomas Stonor, 3rd Baron Camoys in 1821. Charles's younger brother John would follow Charles closely throughout the brothers’ careers, several times filling positions after his older brother left them. In August 1817, he entered the Roman Catholic seminary at St Mary's College, Oscott, studying there until summer 1823. John joined him the next year.

== Career ==
=== Politics ===
Towneley unsuccessfully stood for election for the Whigs in Oxford at a by-election in 1833, caused when his brother-in-law's election was declared void on petition. He stood again in South Lancashire at the 1837 general election, but was also unsuccessful. He was first elected Whig MP for Sligo, Ireland at a by-election in April 1848. However, after a committee formed due to an election petition found he was, by his agents, guilty of treating, he was declared unelected in June, causing a by-election in July. He returned to the seat as an Independent Irish MP after the 1852 general election but, in 1853, again was unseated. Upon another petition, bribery by his agents was again discovered. He made no further bids for parliament afterwards.

=== Military ===
In the build-up to the Crimean War, Towneley was commissioned on 16 March 1853 to raise the 5th Royal Lancashire Militia with the rank of Lieutenant-Colonel Commandant. The auxiliary regiment was already embodied when war was declared against Russia on March 28 of the following year. In May 1855 they began duty at Aldershot and moved to Clonmel, Ireland at the start of December. From mid-April 1856, the regiment spent a month in Dublin, before returning to Burnley to be disembodied on 6 June. He retired from the command on 23 March 1863 and was appointed Honorary Colonel of the regiment. John Towneley was originally commissioned as one of the Majors, and succeeded Charles in both roles.

=== Cattle and horse breeding ===
Burnley Solicitor Richard Eastwood had been appointed as the Towneley legal advisor and land agent by Peregrine Towneley, and continued in the role when Charles inherited the estate. He was also fundamental to the two enterprises that brought Towneley the most publicity: his highly acclaimed stock of the Butterfly family of Shorthorn cattle and his horse stud.

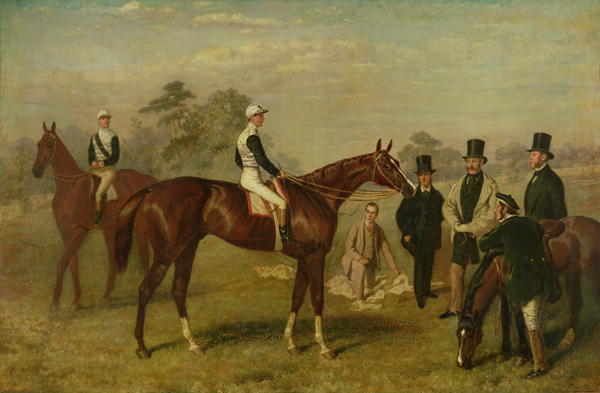
Kettledrum by Harry Hall. The painting depicts the horse and jockey Ralph Bullock, being presented to the Towneley brothers and Richard Eastwood, along with young Richard Towneley and the trainer, George Oates.

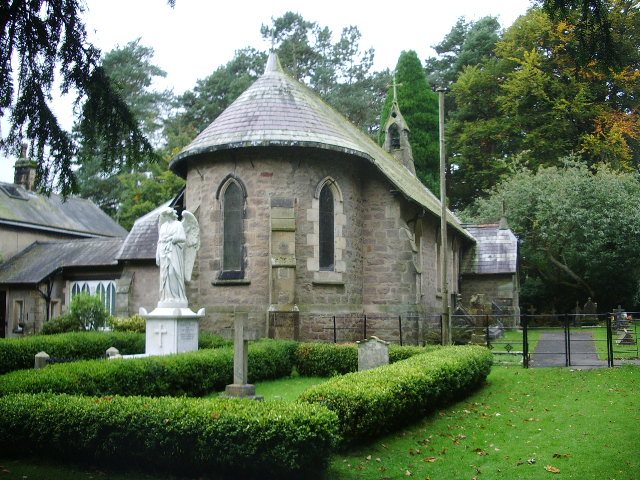
The St Hubert's Church building at Dunsop Bridge was financed from Kettledrum's Derby winnings.

It was Eastwood who sold his small herd of Shorthorns to Towneley in 1848. From this herd, the cow Butterfly won many exhibition prizes and produced many successful calves. Towneley was the only exhibitor to win Ireland's Purcell Challenge Cup three years running.

The situation of Towneley Hall was not ideal for rearing prize cattle. The clay subsoil and higher than average rainfall meant that corn failed to ripen on average one in every six years. Much of the root vegetables and straw required for the animals had to be transported in. Burnley was also rapidly expanding and industrializing. Black smoke from the chimneys mixed with a white fog that contained sulphuric acid from a nearby tile works, killing trees and negatively effecting the grass. Increasing numbers of people walked in the park, transferring diseases and leading to incidents with dogs.

Nevertheless, over the course of fourteen years, the herd won 22 cups, 26 gold medals, over a hundred silver and bronze medals, and more than £2,000 in prize money. Among these prizes was the Farmers Gazette Challenge Cup, which Towneley won for the first three years it was offered. When the heard was sold in 1864, approximately 3,000 people attended the auction at Towneley Hall. Around £7,700 was raised in total for the 56 lots included in the sale.

Meanwhile, Eastwood moved to Thorneyholme Hall on Towneley's Whitewell Estate and took on the management of Root Stud Farm there, until shortly before his death in the summer of 1871.

The horse Hesperithusa won the 1858 Royal Hunt Cup at Ascot and Butterfly won the 1860 Epsom Oaks though both were registered to Eastwood. His horse Kettledrum won the 1861 Epsom Derby, he (and possibly others) used the winnings to build St. Hubert's Catholic Church in Dunsop Bridge.

In 1862, Whitewell (sired by Stockwell) won the Londesborough Plate handicap at Doncaster, Doefoot (sired by King of Trumps) won the Queen's plate at Epsom, Cellarius won the Marine Plate handicap at Brighton, Imperatrice (sired by Orlando) won the Park Hill Stakes at Doncaster, and Newchurch (sired by Newminster) won The Knowsley Nursery Handicap Stakes. In 1863, Doefoot won the Salford Borough Cup at Manchester, Cellarius won the Consolation Scramble handicap at Pontefract and the Ainderby Plate at Northallerton, Newchurch won the Doncaster Plate and the Town Plate at Stockton, and Hubert (also sired by Stockwell) won the Town Plate at Doncaster.

== Appointments ==
Towneley was a justice of the peace for Lancashire. On 28 November 1826, along with his father and many others, Charles was appointed a Deputy Lieutenant of Lancashire. He was elected as a fellow of the Society of Antiquaries of London in 1838, and was a member of the Camden Society. He was elected as a fellow of the Royal Society of London in 1842. In 1847, he inherited the family trustee seat at the British Museum. In 1850, he was elected as a governor of the Royal Agricultural Society of England. He was appointed High Sheriff of Lancashire for 1857. By 1861, he was also a member of the Jockey Club.

Towneley was an early member of the Catholic Poor School Committee (founded 1847) and donated £1,000 toward the establishment of St Mary's Training School, now known as St. Mary's University, in London. He acted with The Earl of Arundel and Surrey, Earl of Shrewsbury, and Charles Langdale to acquire Brook Green House in Hammersmith on behalf of the committee.

== Personal life ==
In 1836, Towneley married Lady Caroline Molyneux, the daughter of William Molyneux, 2nd Earl of Sefton. The couple had three daughters: Caroline (born 1838), who married Montagu Bertie, 7th Earl of Abingdon, Emily (born 1839), who married Lord Alexander Gordon-Lennox, and Alice (born 1846), the second wife of Thomas O'Hagan, 1st Baron O'Hagan. Towneley held the Lordship of Bowland from 1846 until his death in 1876.

As well as Towneley Hall, he also kept a townhouse on Charles Street off Berkeley Square in the Mayfair area of London. In 1860, he was a member of the Brooks's, White's and Athenaeum Gentlemen's clubs.

In 1873, the family landholdings brought in rents totalling £26,979 (the equivalent of approximately £2.5 million as of 2025 (Note: UK Consumer Price Index inflation figures from 1209–2024 based on data from "Inflation calculator". Bank of England. London. 18 February 2026.)) and comprised 14,086 acres in Lancashire with 23,153 acres in Yorkshire and 2,826 acres in County Durham. As he had no male heir, upon 1876 Towneley's death, his brother John inherited the family estates. John's only son Richard died before he did, and it became necessary to divide the property between the seven daughters of the two brothers, requiring a private act of Parliament, the Towneley Estates Act 1885 (48 & 49 Vict. c. 5 Pr.).

Parliament of the United Kingdom
Preceded by John Patrick Somers	Member of Parliament for Sligo; Apr. 1848–Jun. 1848	Succeeded by John Patrick Somers
Preceded by John Patrick Somers	Member of Parliament for Sligo; 1852–1853	Succeeded by John Sadleir
