= Midleton College =

Private day and boarding school, Midleton, County Cork, Ireland

Location
- Connolly Street; Midleton, County Cork; Ireland
- Coordinates: 51°54′55″N 08°10′12″W

Information
- School type: Fee-paying independent
- Motto: Spartam nactus es, hanc exorna (Thou hast found Sparta, adorn it)
- Denomination: Church of Ireland
- Established: 1717
- Founder: Elizabeth Hamilton, Countess of Orkney
- Authority: Board of Governors
- Chairman of Governors: Paul Colton, Bishop of Cork, Cloyne and Ross
- Principal: Edward Gash
- Chaplain: Rev. Andrew Orr
- Staff: 45
- Age range: 12–18
- Hours in school day: 7
- Sports: Rugby (boys); Soccer (girls); Hockey; Cricket; Tennis; Athletics; Orienteering; Golf; Equestrianism
- Publication: Midleton College Magazine
- Website: Midletoncollege.ie

Midleton College is an independent co-educational boarding and day school in Midleton, County Cork, Ireland. In past centuries it has also been called Midleton School.

Although founded in 1696, the school did not open until 1717. It went through a period of inactivity early in the 19th century, and by the 1860s had low numbers, but was reinvigorated by a new principal and by the end of the 1870s was one of Ireland's leading schools. Originally for boys only, it is now co-educational.

The school has a strong Church of Ireland tradition, and its chaplain is also priest-in-charge of the neighbouring Youghal Union of parishes.

== Origins ==
The college was founded in 1696 by Elizabeth Hamilton, Countess of Orkney, as a grammar school for boys, but was not opened until 1717.

Its origin came about when King William III was seeking to pension off his favourite, and former mistress, Elizabeth Villiers, granting her more than 95,000 acres of land in Ireland which had been the personal estates of King James II and later of William III's late wife, Queen Mary II. In November 1695, Elizabeth Villiers married Lord George Hamilton, who a few weeks later was created Earl of Orkney, but before marrying she put her Irish estates into a trust controlled by her brother Lord Villiers and Thomas Brodrick of Midleton, the son and heir of Sir St John Brodrick, who in 1653 had been granted the lands of Corabbey, renamed as Midleton by a charter of 1670. With part of her new riches, Lady Orkney decided to found a school, offering to give land in County Cork to trustees "to build a free school and pay the master a salary of £100". In October 1696, her trustees Villiers and Brodrick conveyed some 1,882 acres in the baronies of Kinnelea and East and West Carbery to two further trustees, Brodrick's brother Alan Brodrick of Midleton and his brother-in-law Laurence Clayton of Mallow. Unfortunately for Lady Orkney, in 1700 the Parliament of England used an Act of Resumption to take back most of her Irish estates, but not the land she had used to endow the school, a gift which was specifically confirmed by another Act of Parliament in 1702. However, Brodrick still did not get on with building a school, claiming that he did not have enough funds in the trust and that time was needed "to accumulate out of the rents and profits a sufficient sum to build a School House". In 1710, the trustees granted leases of the school's land which later proved controversial.

== History ==
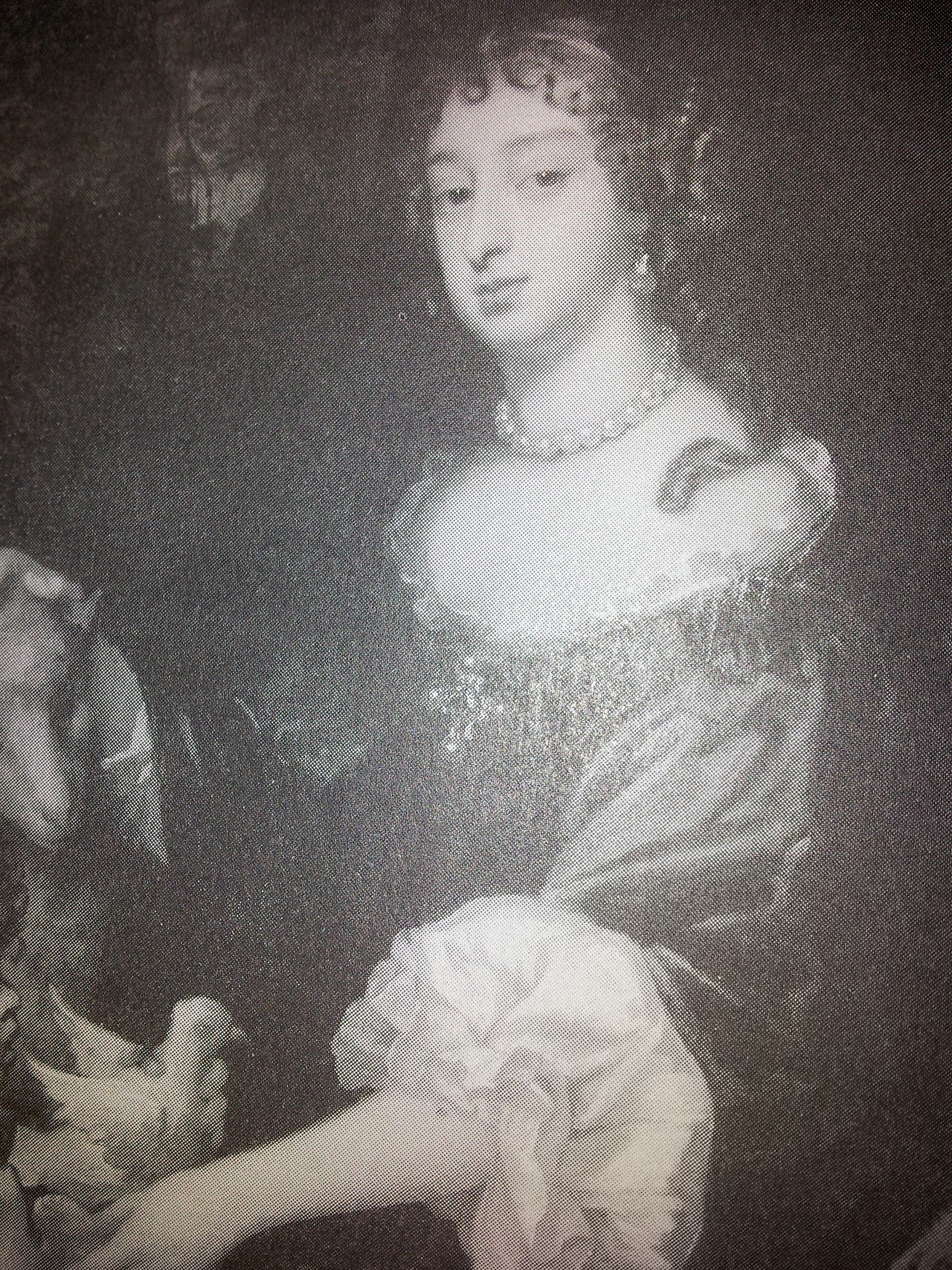
Lady Orkney, founder

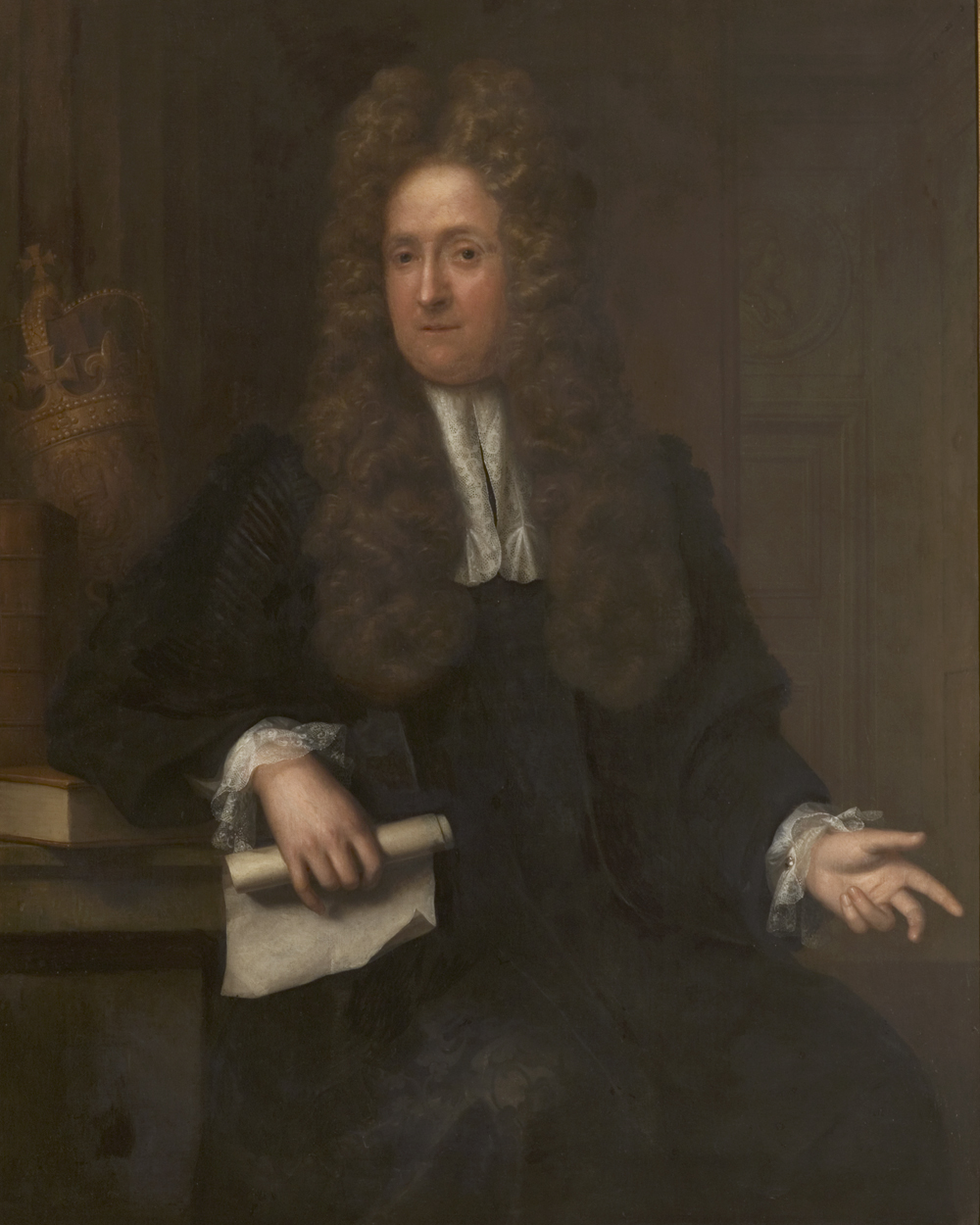
Alan Brodrick, who opened the school, later Viscount Midleton

The school finally opened in 1717, in a new purpose-built limestone schoolhouse which is still in use, with the Rev. George Chinnery, a graduate of Trinity College, Dublin, appointed as the first Master in August 1717. Chinnery was followed in 1750 by his son, and between them the two men ran the school successfully until 1775. The most notable old boy of the Chinnery years was John Philpot Curran (1750–1817), a famous orator and wit who became Master of the Rolls in Ireland. However, after 1775 the school's fortunes suffered. Between 1804 and 1830, all teaching came to an end, with a new Master still drawing his salary but living in Dublin.

According to a committee report published in 1872

Midleton School. — The Countess of Orkney granted, in 1696, over 2,000 acres of land for the foundation of a Free Grammar School at Midleton in the County of Cork, with exhibitions in the University of Dublin. The endowments of this school were shamefully abused, the land having been let on leases, renewable for ever, with small fines, at a rent of 200£, the property now being worth fully 2,000£ a year. An attempt was unsuccessfully made in 1828 by the Commissioners of Education to break the leases. The Endowed Schools Commissioners of 1858 report unfavourably of this school. There are two Exhibitions in Trinity College connected with it, one for 30£, the other for 20£. The subjects of examination, etc., are the same as for the Royal Schools.

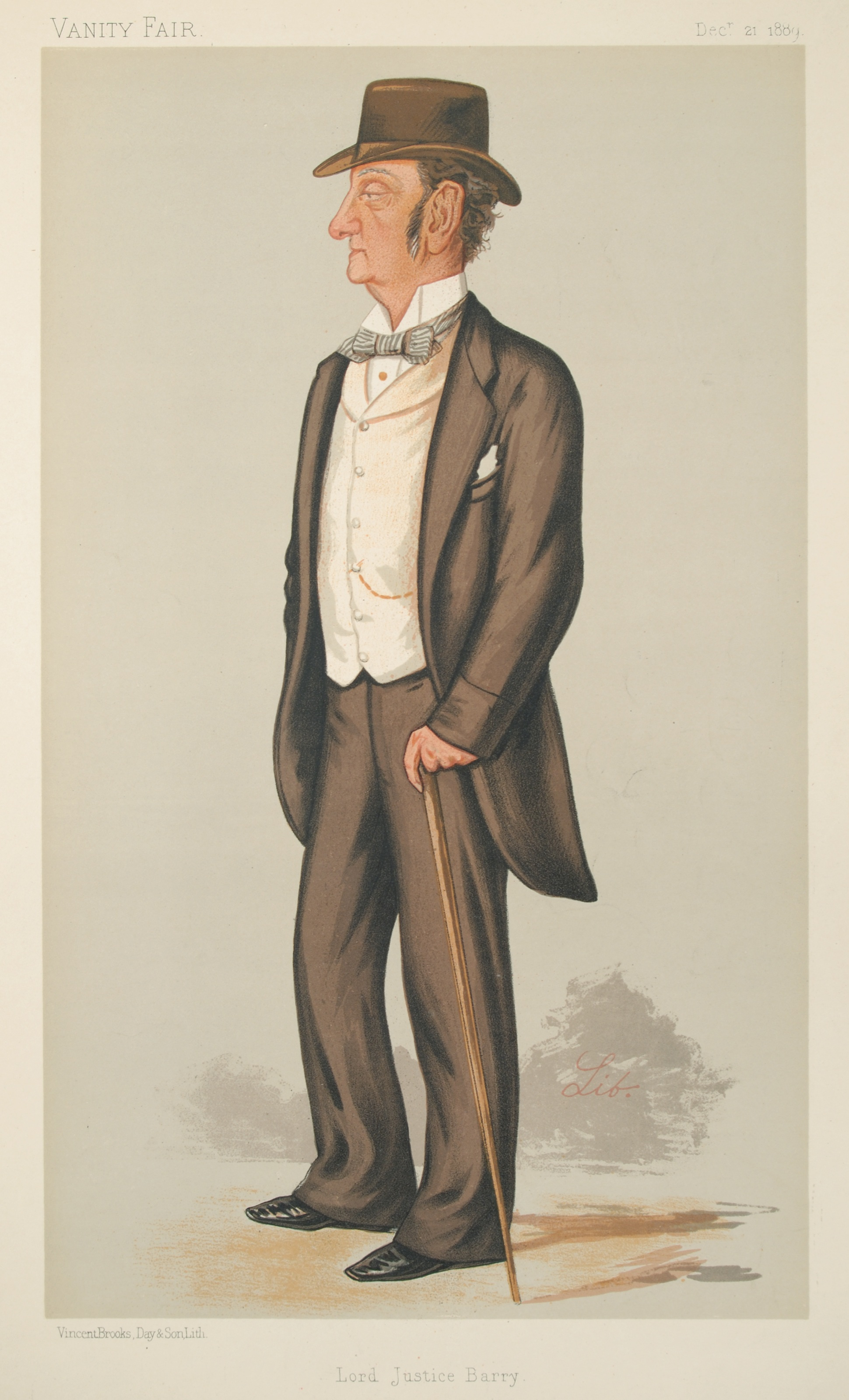
Charles Robert Barry, an old boy, in Vanity Fair, 1889

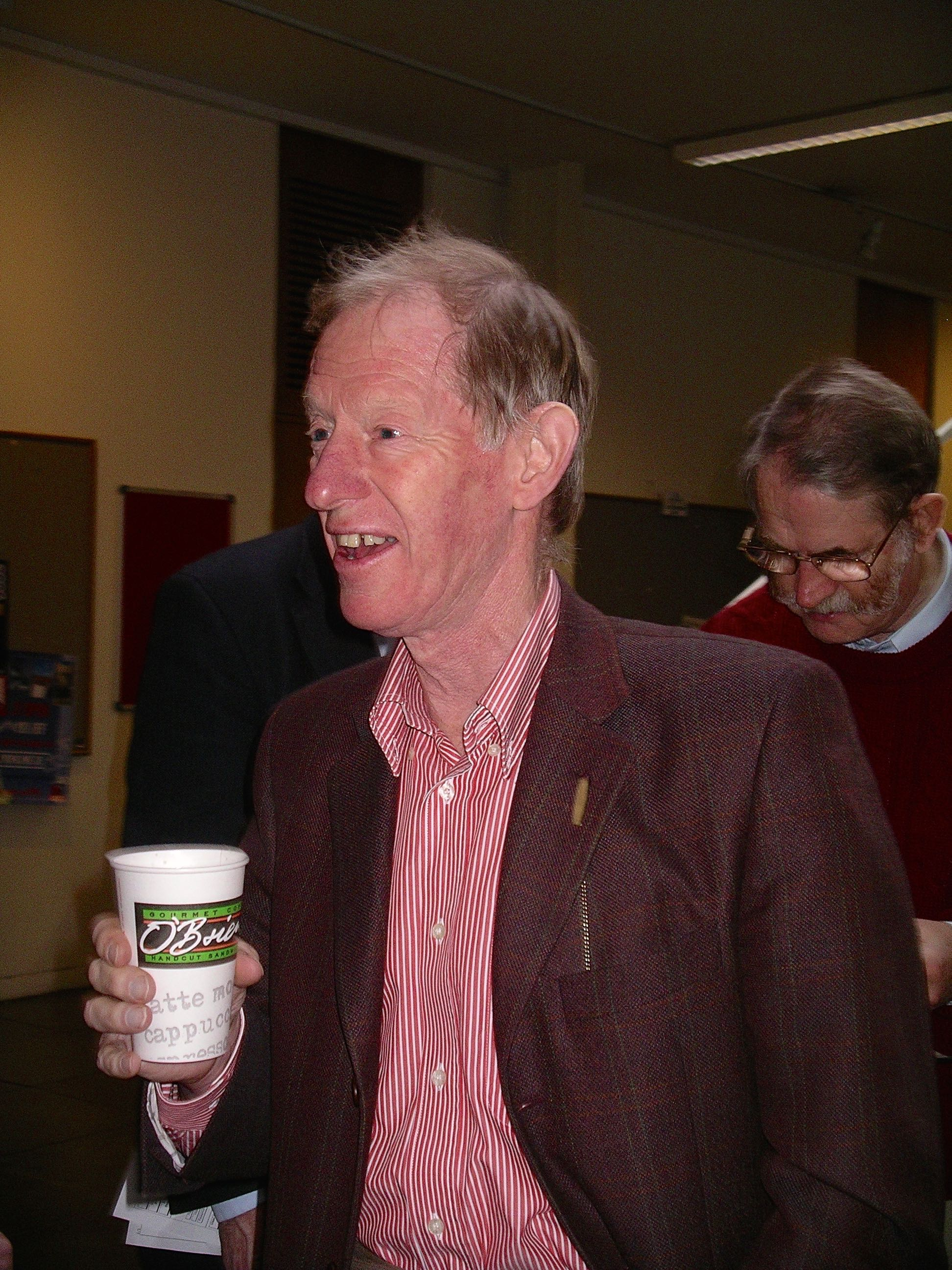
Trevor West, an old boy who wrote a school history

In 1829, the Commissioners of Education repaired the school's main building, and in 1830 a new Master was appointed and the College was re-opened. Among the new intake of boys were Michael Roberts (1817–1882), later a notable mathematician, and his twin brother, William. However, the renewal did not last long. In 1863, the school had only one boarder and three day boys, and a new Principal was appointed, the Rev. Thomas Moore. A man of great energy, within a year Moore had increased the numbers to forty boarders and twenty-two day boys, and in 1864 the Commissioners of Education granted the funding for a new three-storey red-brick School House, providing classrooms, a dormitory, rooms for schoolmasters, and a bathroom, which was completed in 1865.

As an Anglican institution, the school's fortunes might have suffered from the rise of Irish nationalism, and it also had new competition in the shape of the Midleton Christian Brothers Secondary School, opened in 1867, but nevertheless it continued to grow, and in 1878 there were sixty boarders and fifty-one day boys. Moore was by now employing three other schoolmasters, including the young Standish James O'Grady, as well as a housemaster to accommodate extra boarders, and the school joined the top flight of Irish schools, gaining scholarships at Dublin, Oxford, and Cambridge. It was a founding member of the Irish Rugby Football Union, being listed as a member in the first year of the IRFU, 1879.

In 1880, the Lord Lieutenant of Ireland appointed commissioners "to Inquire Into the Endowments, Funds, and Actual Condition" of all endowed schools in Ireland, and in a report in 1881 they commented

There is no doubt that Midleton school is an important foundation, and ought to fulfil the duty of giving the better middle classes in the county of Cork a good education. But it needs a considerable sum of money expended upon it, and also some increase of endowment.

The college became co-educational by first admitting girls in the 1970s. It remains affiliated to the Church of Ireland and has been called "a school of good tradition, proud of its charter of the reign of William III". Paul Colton, Bishop of Cork, Cloyne and Ross, is the Chairman of Governors, who include Alan Brodrick, the latest Viscount Midleton.

== Present-day curriculum ==
Children usually arrive in the school at the age of twelve, enter the First Form, and stay for six years. The first three years, called the junior cycle, are aimed at the Junior Certificate, a set of public examinations taken at the end of the third year. The subjects taught are Irish, English, Mathematics, Religious Education, French, Spanish, German, History, Geography, Science (combining Physics, Chemistry and Biology), Home Economics, Art, Business Studies, Music, Computing, SPHE (Social Personal Health Education), CSPE (Civic, Social and Political Education), and Physical Education.

There then follows a "Transition Year", called the Fourth Form, during which all the subjects available at Leaving Certificate level are taught, so that children experience them all before needing to choose the ones they will take for their Leaving Certificate. During this year, guidance is offered on subject choices for the Leaving Certificate programme of the next two academic years and the subject combinations which can be taught at the college.

The curriculum in the fifth and sixth years, called the senior cycle, is a selection of the subjects taught for the Leaving Certificate, which largely determines access to higher education. At this level, the college has a maximum class size of twenty. The subjects offered are Classical Studies, Maths and Applied Maths, Irish, English, French, Spanish, German, History, Geography, Business, Economics, Accounting, Home Economics, Physics, Chemistry, Biology, Agricultural Science, Art and Art Appreciation, Music, Politics & Society and Computer Science.

== Sports ==
The main school sports are rugby union, soccer, field hockey, cricket, orienteering, golf, athletics, and equestrianism. Rugby at the school is strong, with some ninety boys playing and eight staff members to coach them. The school's senior and junior teams have had many successes in the Mungret Shield, the Mungret Cup, and the Munster Development League. At this school, soccer is a girls' sport. In the summer term, all boys and some girls play cricket. Many boys and girls play hockey, for which there are twelve coaches. Orienteering is a winter activity for all comers. The school has taken part in the Munster Schools League since 2003, with local victories and with students going on to the European and World Orienteering Championships.

== People educated at the school ==
See also Category:People educated at Midleton College

- Charles Robert Barry (1823–1897), politician and judge, Solicitor-General for Ireland
- Isaac Butt (1813–1879), barrister and Member of Parliament at Westminster, founder of the Home Rule League
- Sir James Cotter, 1st Baronet (1714–1770), member of the Irish House of Commons
- John Philpot Curran (1750–1817), an orator, politician, wit, lawyer and judge, Master of the Rolls in Ireland
- Reginald Dyer (1864–1927), Indian Army officer responsible for the Jallianwala Bagh massacre that took place on 13 April 1919 in Amritsar (in the province of Punjab)
- William Fitzgerald (1814–1883), Church of Ireland bishop of Killaloe
- Edward Hincks (1792–1866), clergyman and Assyriologist
- George Green Loane (1865–1945), classical scholar and schoolmaster
- Michael McCarthy (1864–1928), lawyer and author
- Ben Mitchell (born 1994), rugby footballer
- William O'Brien (1832–1899), judge
- Dave O'Callaghan (born 1990), rugby footballer
- John O'Mahony (1815–1877), Gaelic scholar and founding member of the Fenian Brotherhood
- Louis Claude Purser (1854–1932), classical scholar
- Michael Roberts (1817–1882), mathematician and academic of Trinity College, Dublin
- Clive Ross (born 1989), rugby footballer
- William Armstrong Russell (1821–1879), Anglican Bishop of North China
- Sir Francis Spring (1849–1933), civil engineer and member of the Imperial Legislative Council of British India
- Sir Edward Sullivan, 1st Baronet (1822–1885), lawyer and Member of Parliament, Solicitor General for Ireland, Attorney General for Ireland, Master of the Rolls in Ireland, and Lord Chancellor of Ireland
- George Tyrrell (1861–1909), Jesuit priest
- Trevor West (1938–2012), academic and member of Seanad Éireann for Dublin University
- Alan R. White (1922–1992), philosopher
- Barry Yelverton, 1st Viscount Avonmore (1736–1805), politician and judge

== Motto ==
The motto of the college, Spartam nactus es, hanc exorna, is shared with Loretto School, in Scotland, and means literally "Thou hast found Sparta, adorn it". The Latin is a mistranslation by Erasmus of a line from a Greek play, Telephus by Euripides. The words have been interpreted as meaning "You were born with talents, develop them", but could just as well mean "You have come into a great nation, be worthy of it". In the late 18th century, the words were quoted by the Anglo-Irish statesman Edmund Burke in his pamphlet, Reflections on the Revolution in France. Burke uses the words in this context:

"There is something else than the mere alternative of absolute destruction, or unreformed existence. Spartam nactus es; hanc exorna. This is, in my opinion, a rule of profound sense, and ought never to depart from the mind of an honest reformer. I cannot conceive how any man can have brought himself to that pitch of presumption, to consider his country as nothing but carte blanche, upon which he may scribble whatever he pleases... a good patriot, and a true politician, always considers how he shall make the most of the existing materials of his country. A disposition to preserve, and an ability to improve, taken together, would be my standard of a statesman.
