= William Joseph O'Neill Daunt =

Irish politician

William O'Neill Daunt
- Born: William Joseph O'Neill Daunt; 28 April 1807; Tullamore, Ireland
- Died: 29 June 1894 (aged 87); Kilcascan Castle, Ballineen, County Cork, Ireland
- Resting place: St Patrick's Cemetery, Dunmanway
- Occupations: Politician, writer
- Known for: Secretary to Daniel O’Connell, Repeal movement, nationalist writing
- Notable work: A Life Spent for Ireland, Personal Recollections of the Late Daniel O’Connell

William Joseph O'Neil Daunt (28 April 1807 – 29 June 1894) was an Irish politician and writer. A supporter of Daniel O’Connell and the Repeal movement, he was known for his political activism, historical writing and memoirs.

== Early life ==
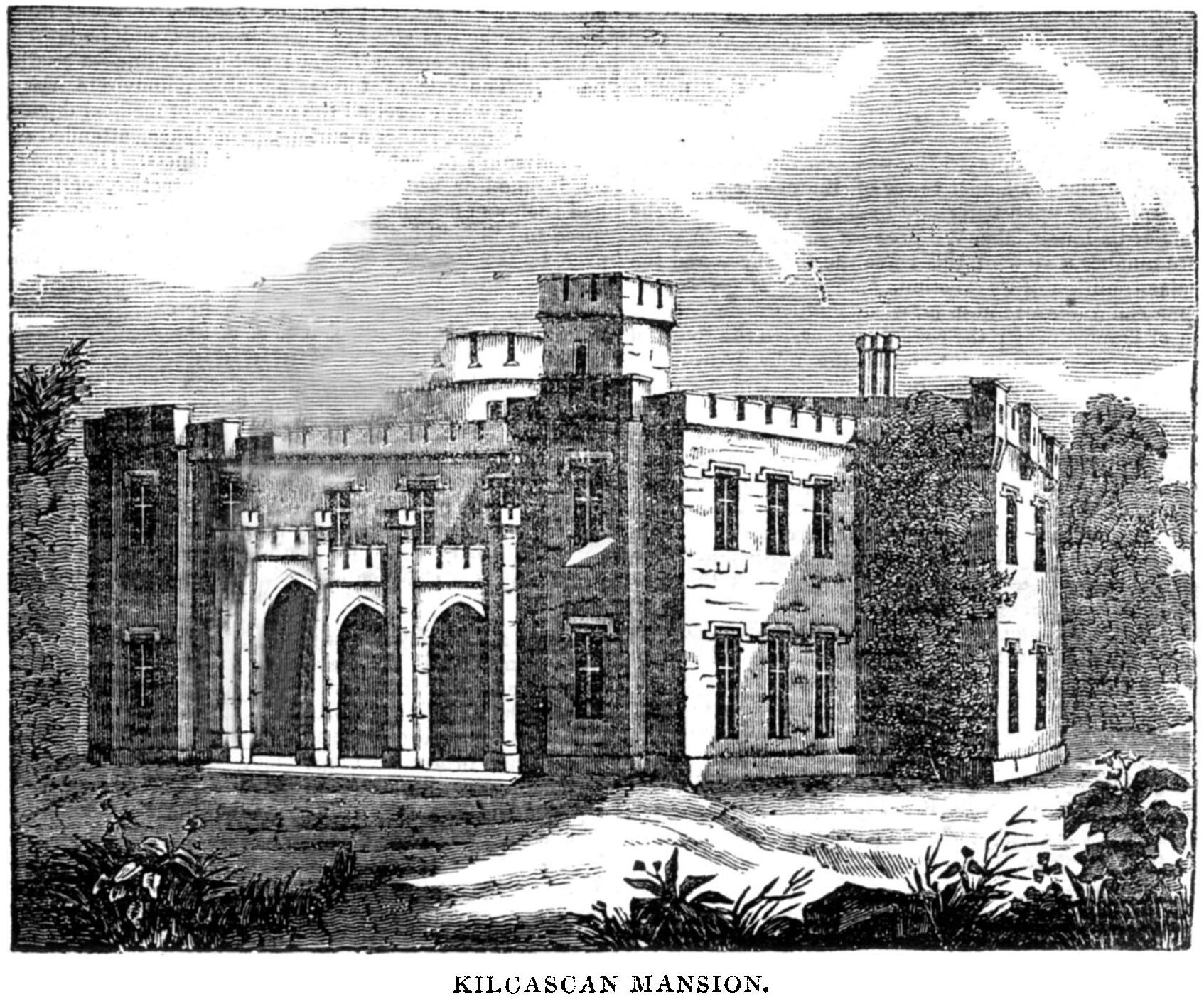
Kilcascan Castle, 1834, Dublin Penny Journal

Daunt was born in Tullamore and grew up on the family estate of Kilkascan, near Ballineen, County Cork. In his youth, he became acquainted with Feargus O'Connor, a future Chartist leader who lived nearby. At age 19, Daunt inherited Kilcascan following the death of his father, Joseph Daunt, who was reportedly the last person in Ireland to be shot and killed in a duel, in 1826, by a cousin from the neighbouring Manch House. Though born into a Protestant family, Daunt converted to Catholicism after his father's death.

== Political career ==
Daunt became active in local politics, notably opposing the tithes payable to the Church of Ireland and a supporter of Daniel O’Connell and the campaign for Catholic emancipation and the repeal of the Act of Union.

In the 1832 United Kingdom general election, Daunt stood as a parliamentary candidate for the Mallow constituency, contesting the seat against the incumbent, Denham Jephson, who was the dominant landowner in the town and widely expected to retain the seat. However, Jephson’s opposition to repeal turned public opinion and Daunt secured a surprise victory. The Times described the result as "perhaps the most extraordinary of all the extraordinary instances of Daniel O'Connell's influence" at the election. Nonetheless, an election petition overturned the result and Jephson was reinstated. Daunt incurred a significant personal financial loss as a result of the episode.

Daunt played a prominent part in the repeal agitation – as one of the fifteen founder members of the Loyal National Repeal Association in 1840, he was repeal director for Leinster and head repeal warden of Scotland in 1843.

Following Daniel O’Connell’s 1841 election as Lord Mayor of Dublin, Daunt was appointed his secretary. From 1864, he was active in the National Association of Ireland, where he sought to build links with the Liberal Party in England. Daunt also played a key role in founding the Home Government Association, acting as its secretary in 1873.

== Writings and Legacy ==
Outside of politics, Daunt was a prolific writer. Under the pseudonym Denis Ignatius Moriarty, he published several novels. He also wrote historical works and political commentaries. His diaries were published posthumously as A Life Spent for Ireland, offering valuable first-hand insights into Irish nationalist politics in the 19th century.

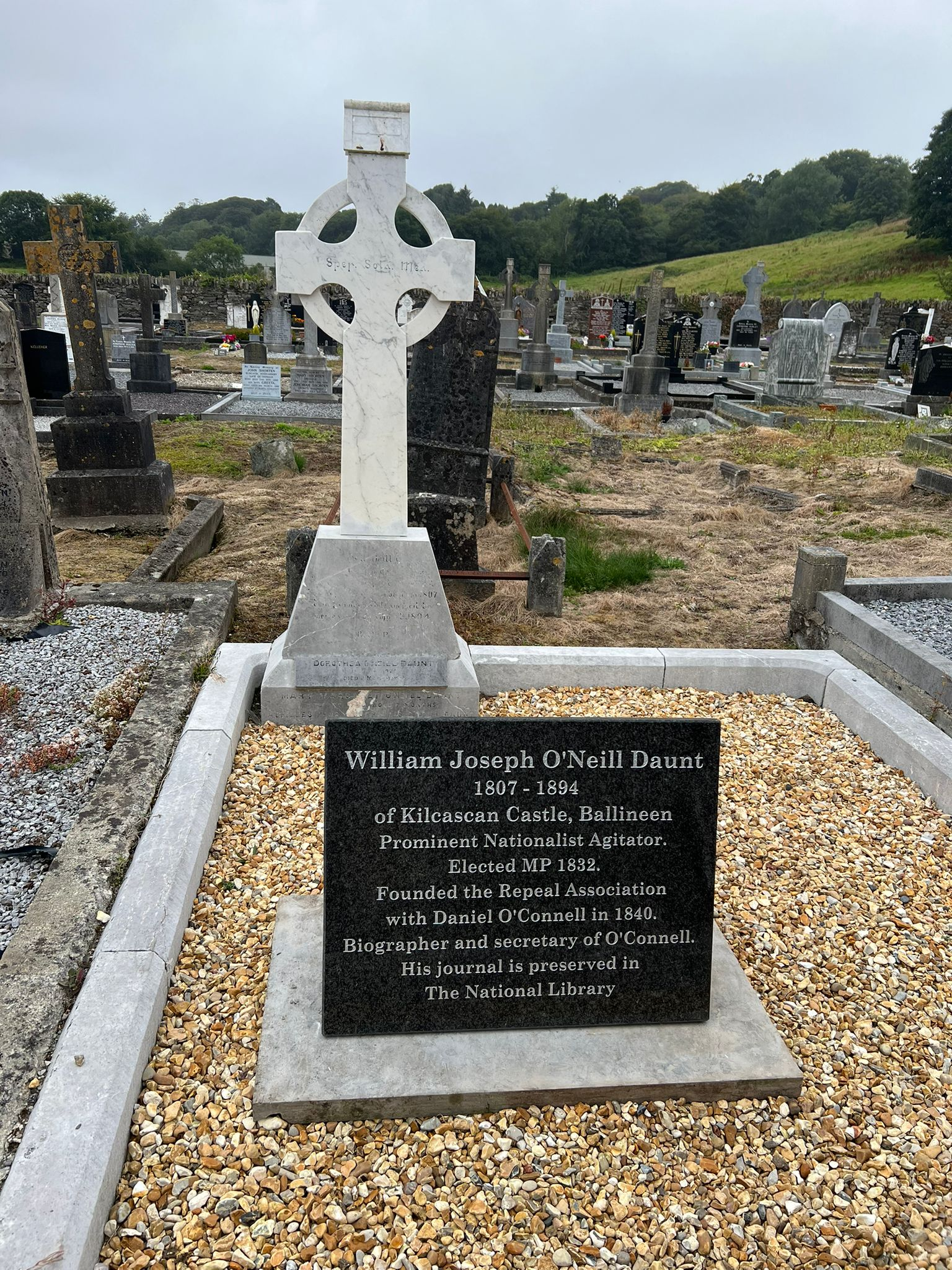
Headstone marking the grave of William O'Neill Daunt.

== Personal life ==
In July 1839, Daunt married Ellen Hickey (d. 1897), reputedly “the daughter of one of his labourers, whose charms captivated his fancy”. The couple had two children: a son, Achilles Thomas Daunt, who inherited the family estate at Kilcascan and a daughter, Alice Daunt (c.1847–1914), who would later edit her father's diaries and also publish novels.

During the Great Famine (1845–1847), Daunt reportedly expended much of his personal funds aiding tenants, including commissioning a new public roadway (called the “New Line”) to provide employment.

William O'Neill Daunt died on 29 June 1894 at Kilcascan. He was buried in St Patrick’s Cemetery, Dunmanway.

His contemporary, Charles Gavan Duffy, described him as “tall and good-looking with the bearing of a courteous gentleman,” though “too cold to be popular".

Parliament of the United Kingdom
Preceded by Denham Jephson	Member of Parliament for Mallow; 1832–1833	Succeeded by Denham Jephson
