= Denham Jephson-Norreys =

Anglo-Irish landowner and Whig politician

Sir (Charles) Denham Orlando Jephson-Norreys, 1st Baronet DL (1 December 1799 – 11 July 1888), known as Denham Jephson until 1838, was an Anglo-Irish landowner and Whig politician.

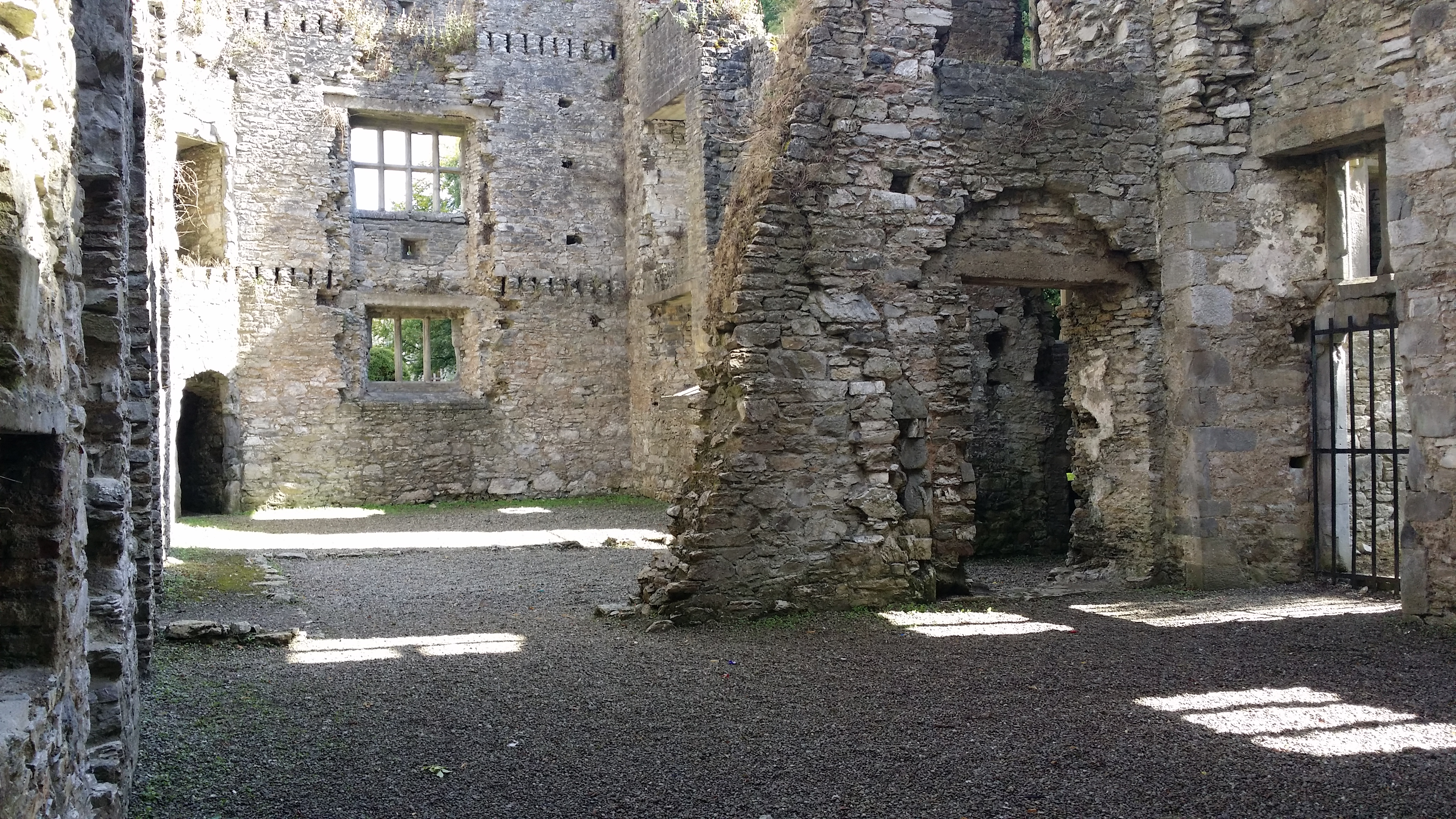
Mallow Castle

Born Denham Jephson, he was the grandson of William Jephson and the great-grandson of Anthony Jephson, who both represented Mallow in the Irish House of Commons. He was a descendant of Sir John Jephson, husband of Elizabeth Norreys, daughter of Sir Thomas Norreys, Lord President of Munster, who was granted Mallow Castle following the Desmond Rebellion. He was returned to the British House of Commons for Mallow in 1826, a seat he held until 1832. He was re-elected in 1833, when the incumbent, William Daunt, was unseated on petition. In July 1838 he was created a baronet, of Mallow in the County of Cork. Later that month he assumed by Royal licence the additional surname of Norreys. He continued to represent Mallow in Parliament until 1859.

Jephson-Norreys married Catherine Cecilia Jane Franks, daughter of William Franks and Catherine Hume of Carrig Castle, County Cork, and sister of Sir Thomas Harte Franks, in 1821. They had four children, two of whom died young. They lived at Mallow Castle, County Cork. Lady Jephson-Norreys died in December 1853. Jephson-Norreys died on 11 July 1888, aged 88. He had no surviving sons and the baronetcy died with him. The Mallow estate, by now heavily encumbered with debt, passed to his eldest daughter Catherine.

Parliament of the United Kingdom
| Preceded by William Wrixon Becher | Member of Parliament for Mallow; 1826–1832 | Succeeded by William Joseph O'Neill Daunt |
| Preceded by William Joseph O'Neill Daunt | Member of Parliament for Mallow; 1833–1859 | Succeeded by Robert Longfield |
Baronetage of the United Kingdom
| New creation | Baronet (of Mallow); 1838–1888 | Extinct |
| Preceded by Clifford baronets | Jephson-Norreys baronets of Mallow; 7 August 1838 | Succeeded by Forrest baronets |
