= John Arthur Wynne =

Irish politician

Member of Parliament for Sligo
- In office 1857–1860

Member of Parliament for Sligo
- In office 1856–1857

Member of Parliament for Sligo
- In office 1830-1832

Personal details
- Born: 20 April 1801
- Died: 19 June 1865 (aged 64)
- Party: Conservative
- Spouse: Anne Butler
- Children: 4
- Parent: Owen Wynne (father)
- Education: Christ Church, Oxford

John Arthur Wynne PC (20 April 1801 – 19 June 1865) was an Irish landowner and politician.

== Biography ==
He was the eldest surviving son of Owen Wynne (1755–1841) of Hazelwood House, Sligo, Ireland and educated at Winchester School (1816–1819) and Christ Church, Oxford (1820). He succeeded his father in 1841, inheriting the family seat of Hazelwood House, Sligo, and was appointed High Sheriff of Sligo for 1840–41.

He was elected as a Conservative Member of Parliament for Sligo in 1830 and again in 1856, resigning in 1860 by becoming Steward of the Manor of Northstead. He was made an Irish Privy Counsellor in 1852.

He died on a visit to Tuam in 1865. He had married Lady Anne Wandesford Butler, the daughter of James Butler, 1st Marquess of Ormonde. They had 2 sons (one of whom predeceased him) and 2 daughters. He was succeeded by his son Owen (1843–1910).

Parliament of the United Kingdom
Preceded by Owen Wynne	Member of Parliament for Sligo; 1830–1832	Succeeded by John Martin
Preceded by John Sadleir	Member of Parliament for Sligo; 1856–1857	Succeeded by John Patrick Somers
Preceded by John Patrick Somers	Member of Parliament for Sligo; 1857–1860	Succeeded by Francis Macdonogh
