= Arthur Edward Knox =

British sportsman, amateur naturalist and author (1808-1886)

Arthur Edward Knox (28 December 1808, Dublin – 23 December 1886) was a British sportsman, amateur naturalist, author of three books, and one of the founders of the British Ornithological Union.

A. E. Knox graduated M.A. from Brasenose College in the University of Oxford. He obtained a commission in the Second Regiment of Life Guards, from which he resigned about 1835 when he married Lady Jane Parsons, a daughter of Lawrence Parsons, 2nd Earl of Rosse. The marriage produced three daughters and two sons, one of whom was Lawrence E. Knox.

A. E. Knox was a country gentleman who lived in Sussex and Surrey and contributed notes to The Zoologist. His 1849 book Ornithological Rambles in Sussex received a favourable review from his friend and country-neighbour, Bishop Wilberforce, helping the sale of the book so that a second edition appeared in 1850 and a third edition in 1855. In November 1858 Knox became one of the founders of the British Ornithological Union. There were favourable reviews for his 1872 book Autumns on the Spey dealing with salmon-fishing and deer-stalking in the vicinity of the River Spey; the book is based upon letters written by Knox to friends in England when he was staying, during several autumns, at Gordon Castle as a guest of Charles Gordon-Lennox, 6th Duke of Richmond.

== Selected publications ==
- Ornithological Rambles in Sussex. 1849.
- Game birds and wild fowl, their friends and their foes. 1850.
- Autumns on the Spey. 1872.
