= Michael Roberts (mathematician) =

Irish mathematician (1817–1882)

Michael Roberts (18 April 1817 – 4 October 1882), was an Irish mathematician and academic of Trinity College, Dublin (TCD), who served as Erasmus Smith's Professor of Mathematics there 1862-1879.

== Life ==
Roberts was born into a well-established landed gentry family in County Cork, whose ancestors had settled there from Kent about 1630. His mother was of Scottish origins, descended from the Colonel Stewart who was governor of Edinburgh Castle and took part in the Jacobite rising of 1715.

Roberts had a twin brother, William, and they were educated together at Midleton School, Cork. A portrait is reported of Roberts and his twin brother at the age of sixteen. He entered TCD in 1833. He was awarded a classical scholarship in 1836, but studied mostly under the notable mathematician and natural philosopher James MacCullagh. On graduating BA in 1838, he was elected a fellow of Trinity, and in 1862 became Erasmus Smith's Professor of Mathematics, a position he held until 1879, when he was elected as Senior Fellow. In 1848 he had been appointed the first Professor of Mathematics at Queen's College, Galway, but he resigned from the position before the college opened to students in 1849.

== Research ==
Among Roberts's earlier lectures were a series on the Theory of Invariants and Covariants, on which he published papers. Next, he took an interest in hyperelliptic integrals, a subject developed by Jacobi, Riemann, and Weierstrass. In 1871 he published a "Tract on the Addition of Elliptic and Hyperelliptic Integrals", constructing a trigonometry of hyperelliptic functions on the analogy of that of elliptic functions.

Roberts discovered many properties of geodesic lines and lines of curvature on the ellipsoid, especially in relation to umbilics, and from 1845 published papers in the Journal de Mathématiques, the Proceedings of the Royal Irish Academy, Cambridge and Dublin Mathematical Journal, Nouvelles Annales de Mathématiques. In 1850 he wrote in the Journal de Mathématiques of the lines of curvature and asymptotic lines on a surface, at any point of which the sum of the principal curvatures is zero. The International Exhibition of 1851 at Hyde Park displayed a small model ellipsoid, on which the lines of curvature had been traced according to a method Roberts invented. Roberts published several papers on the properties and functions of the roots of algebraic equations, and on covariants and invariants. From 1868 to 1873 he published work in Annali di Matematica, including in 1869 and 1871 two papers on Abelian function.

== Personal life ==
In 1851, Roberts married Kate Atkin, a daughter of John Drew Atkin, of Merrion Square, Dublin, and they had seven children, three sons and four daughters.

In the 1870s, his health began to fail, and he died in Dublin in October 1882.
