= George Green Loane =

Anglo-Irish classical scholar, schoolmaster, editor and author (1865–1945)

George Green Loane (1865 – 17 May 1945) was an Anglo-Irish classical scholar, schoolmaster, editor, and author.

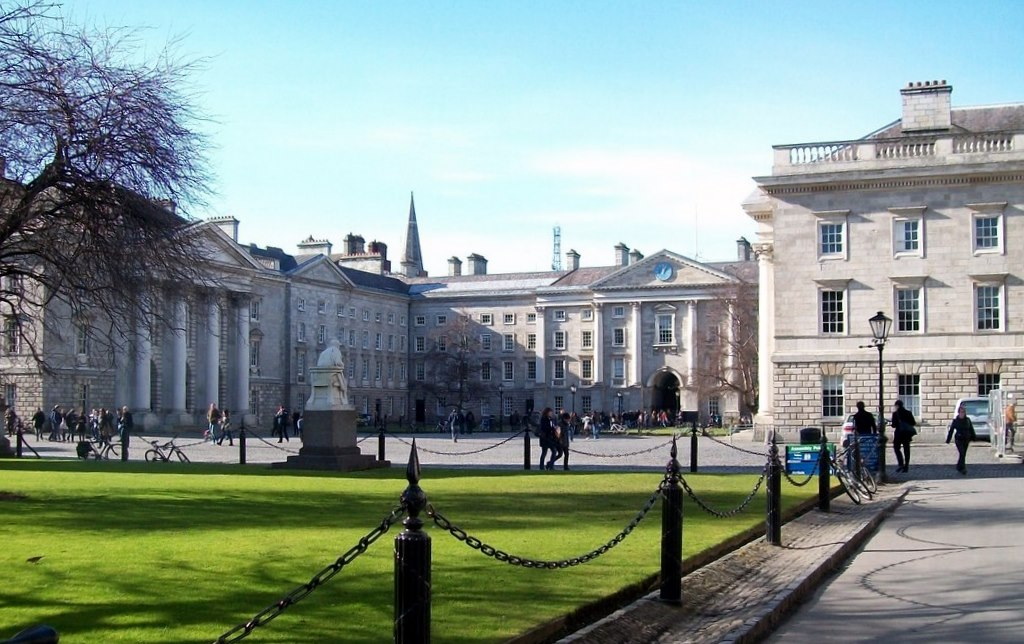
Trinity College, Dublin

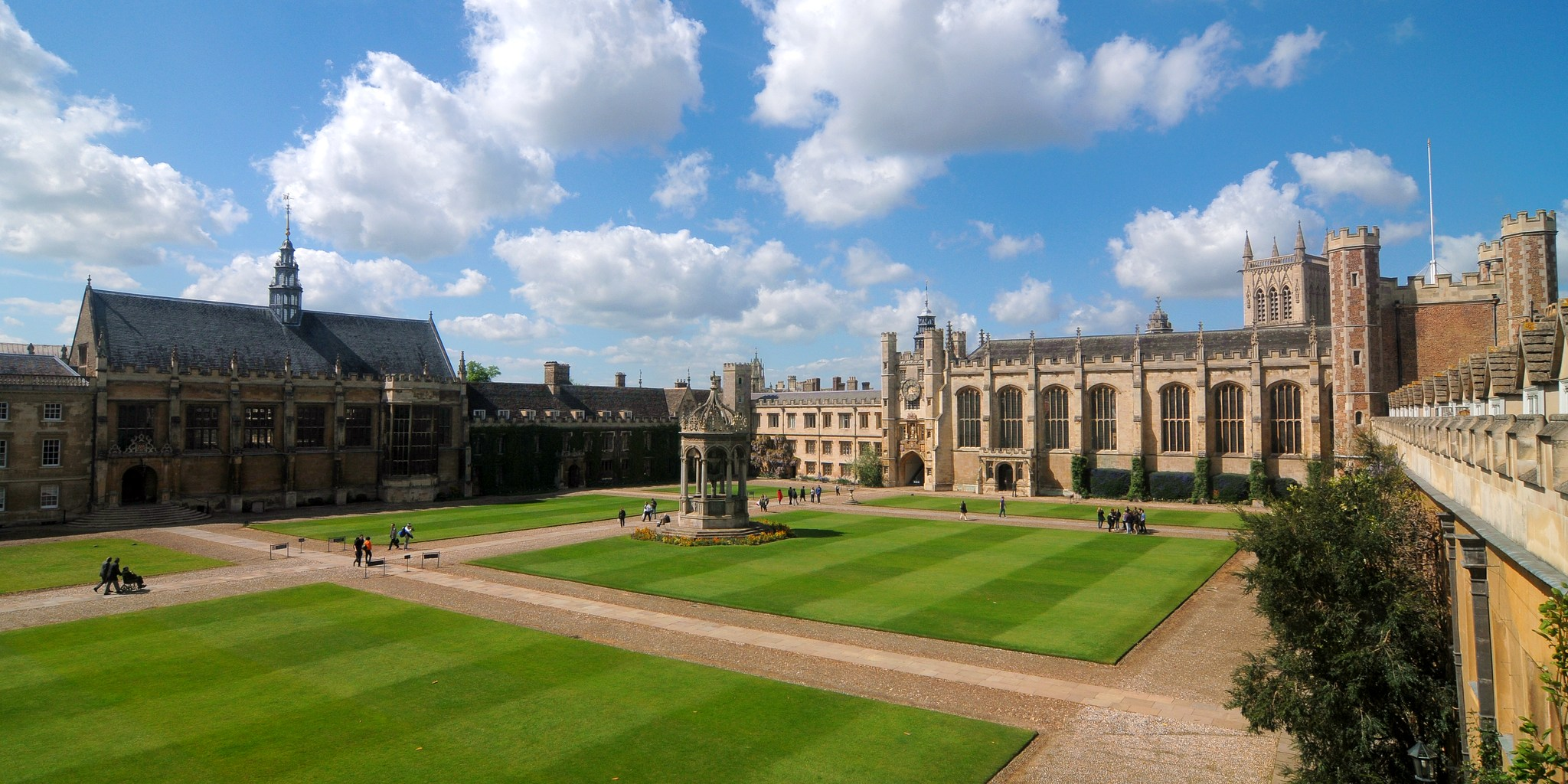
Trinity College, Cambridge

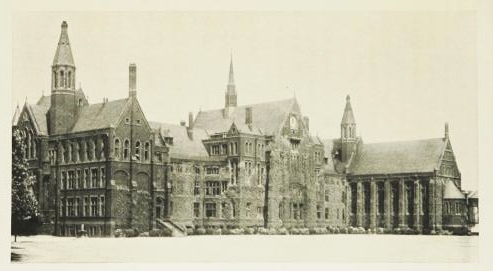
St Paul's School, Hammersmith

== Early life ==
A son of the Reverend Richard Hussey Loane, of Rushbrook, Queenstown, by his marriage in 1859 to Jane Green, Loane was born at Cork and educated at Midleton College, the Royal College, Armagh, Trinity College Dublin, where he was elected a Scholar and a gold medallist, and finally at Trinity College, Cambridge. He was admitted there as a sizar in October 1890, gained a scholarship in 1892, and graduated BA with first class honours in the Classical Tripos in 1893, proceeding to MA in 1898.

== Life and career ==
Loane was a schoolmaster at St Paul's School, which was then in Hammersmith, from 1893 to 1925, serving as a housemaster from 1901 to 1908.

Loane edited and wrote a number of books, mostly for use in schools. His Longer Narrative Poems of the Nineteenth Century (1897) and A Short Handbook of Literary Terms (1900) both had multiple editions.

On 27 December 1900, Loane married Edith Armitage, a daughter of the Rev. William Firth Armitage, vicar of Scotforth, Lancashire, at Scotforth. Their daughter Alice Margaret was born at Fulham in 1902, and another daughter, Joan Edith, in 1904. After retiring from St Paul's, Loane settled in Stroud, Gloucestershire, where he died in 1945. Joan Edith married Francis Wood Smith at St George's, Hanover Square in 1933.

== Selected publications ==
- George Green Loane, ed., Longer Narrative Poems of the Nineteenth Century (1897, several editions)
- George Green Loane, A Short Handbook of Literary Terms (1900, a further 14 editions until 1976)
- George Green Loane, ed., Livy: Book XXI, with Introduction, Notes &c (Blackie, reprinted 1986)
- George Green Loane, ed., Selected English Essays (London: Dent, The Kings Treasuries of Literature series, 1921)
- George G. Loane, M.A., Longer Narrative Poems (18th Century) edited for Schools (1921)
- George Green Loane, A Book of Story Poems (University of California Libraries, 1921)
- George Green Loane More English essays (1928, new edition 1941)
- George Green Loane, Echoes in Tennyson, and Other Essays (London: Stockwell, 1928)
- George G. Loane, "Chapman's Homer", The Cornhill Magazine, vol. 156 (1937), pp. 637–640
- George G. Loane, "Misprints in Chapman's Homer", Notes and Queries 173 (1937), pp. 398–402
