= Francis Macdonogh =

Irish politician and barrister

Francis Macdonogh QC

Member of Parliament for Sligo
- In office 9 August 1860 – 15 July 1865
- Preceded by: Arthur John Wynne
- Succeeded by: Richard Armstrong

Personal details
- Born: 1806
- Died: 18 April 1882 (aged 75–76) Dublin, Ireland
- Party: Conservative
- Other political affiliations: Whig

Francis Macdonogh QC (1806 – 18 April 1882) was an Irish politician and barrister.

Macdonogh was admitted to the bar in 1829, and made a member of the Queen's Counsel in 1842, later becoming counsel to Inland Revenue for Ireland for 1858 to 1859. He was also a Justice of the Peace for County Armagh, County Kilkenny and County Sligo.

Macdonogh first stood for election as a Whig in Carrickfergus in 1857, but was unsuccessful. He was later elected as th Member of Parliament (MP) for Sligo at a by-election in 1860 – caused by Arthur John Wayne's resignation – and held the seat until 1868 when he was defeated.

Parliament of the United Kingdom
| Preceded by John Arthur Wynne | Member of Parliament for Sligo; 1860 – 1865 | Succeeded by Richard Armstrong |
