= 1872 Mallow by-election =

UK Parliamentary by-election

The 1872 Mallow by-election was fought on 7 June 1872. The by-election was fought due to the resignation of the incumbent MP of the Liberal Party, George Waters, as he became Chairman of the Quarter Sessions of the County of Waterford. It was won by the Liberal candidate William Felix Munster.
