= Sligo and Cashel Disfranchisement Act 1870 =

Act of the Parliament of the United Kingdom

- Act of Parliament
- Parliament of the United Kingdom
- Long title: An Act to disfranchise the Boroughs of Sligo and Cashel.
- Citation: 33 & 34 Vict. c. 38
- Territorial extent: United Kingdom

Dates
- Royal assent: 1 August 1870
- Commencement: 1 August 1870 (Note: Section 1.)
- Repealed: 22 September 1893
Other legislation
Repealed by	Statute Law Revision (No. 2) Act 1893
Relates to	Parliamentary Elections Act 1868

Status: Repealed

Text of statute as originally enacted

The Sligo and Cashel Disfranchisement Act 1870 (33 & 34 Vict. c. 38) was an act of the Parliament of the United Kingdom which removed the separate franchise from the parliamentary boroughs of Sligo and Cashel. This followed allegations of corrupt practices at the 1868 general election and a report under the Parliamentary Elections Act 1868.

Those previously eligible were to have the right to vote in the county constituencies of County Sligo and County Tipperary respectively, except for certain individuals named within the reports which led to the legislation.

== Subsequent developments ==
The whole act was repealed by section 1 of, and the first schedule to, the Statute Law Revision (No. 2) Act 1893 (56 & 57 Vict. c. 54), which came into force on 22 September 1893.
