= Representation of the People (Ireland) Act 1868 =

Act of the Parliament of the United Kingdom reforming the electoral system in Ireland

Representation of the People (Ireland) Act 1868 (Note: Section 1.)
- Act of Parliament
- Parliament of the United Kingdom
- Long title: An Act to amend the Representation of the People in Ireland.
- Citation: 31 & 32 Vict. c. 49
- Territorial extent: Ireland (Note: Section 2.)

Dates
- Royal assent: 13 July 1868
- Commencement: 1 January 1868 (Note: Section 3.)
- Repealed: 23 February 1950
Other legislation
Amended by	Statute Law Revision Act 1875; Representation of the People Act 1918; Representation of the People Act 1948
Repealed by	Representation of the People Act 1949
Relates to	Representation of the People Act 1867

Status: Repealed

Text of statute as originally enacted

Results of the 1868 election, with the new boundaries. Constituencies are coloured yellow for Liberal, blue for Conservative.

The Representation of the People (Ireland) Act 1868 (31 & 32 Vict. c. 49) was an act of the Parliament of the United Kingdom.

The act did not alter the overall distribution of parliamentary seats in Ireland. It was originally proposed to merge twelve smaller boroughs into six pairs on the model of Scottish district of burghs and Welsh contributory boroughs, with the freed-up seats being transferred to the six most populous county constituencies. This was rejected by Parliament, although the act as passed did alter the boundaries of those parliamentary boroughs which were also municipal boroughs, extending the parliamentary boundary to include all the municipal boundary.

Of Ireland's 33 parliamentary boroughs, 11 were also municipal boroughs under the Municipal Corporations (Ireland) Act 1840 (3 & 4 Vict. c. 108):

- Belfast (constituency)
- Clonmel (constituency)
- Cork (constituency)
- Drogheda (constituency)
- Dublin (constituency)
- Kilkenny (constituency)
- Limerick (constituency)
- Londonderry (constituency)
- Sligo (constituency)
- Waterford (constituency)
- Wexford (constituency)

== Subsequent developments ==
The whole act, except section 13, was repealed by section 80(7) of, and the thirteenth schedule to, the Representation of the People Act 1948 (11 & 12 Geo. 6. c. 65), which came into force on 30 July 1948.

The whole act was repealed by section 175(1) of, and the ninth schedule to, the Representation of the People Act 1949 (12, 13 & 14 Geo. 6. c. 68), which came into force on 23 February 1950.

== Bibliography ==
- "C.49: An Act to amend the Representation of the People in Ireland". The Public general statutes. Vol. 31 & 32 Vict. printed by Eyre and Spottiswoode at the Queen's Printing Office. 1867–68.
