= Lawrence E. Knox =

Founder of The Irish Times

Major Lawrence Edward Knox

Member of Parliament for Sligo
- In office 1868–1870
- Preceded by: Richard Armstrong
- Succeeded by: Borough disenfranchised for corruption

Personal details
- Born: 1836 Kemp Town, East Sussex, England
- Died: 1873 (aged 36–37) Dublin, Ireland
- Cause of death: Scarlet fever
- Known for: Founder of The Irish Times

Lawrence Edward Knox (1836–1873) was a British Army officer and founder of The Irish Times. He was born in the Kemp Town area of Brighton in East Sussex, England. His parents were Arthur Edward Knox of Castlereagh, near Killala, County Mayo, (later Trotton House, Sussex) and Jane Parsons, daughter of Laurence Parsons, 2nd Earl of Rosse.

In 1859, at the age of 22, he founded The Irish Times. Knox purchased an Ensigncy in the 63rd Foot in 1854 and was promoted lieutenant without purchase later the same year. He purchased a Captaincy in 1857. He exchanged into the 11th Foot in 1858. In 1866 he was commissioned major in the Tower Hamlets Militia. In 1868 he was elected to Parliament for Sligo, although the election was later declared void and the borough disenfranchised for corruption. Eighteen months later, in May 1870, he contested a by-election in Mallow on the platform of Isaac Butt's fledgling Home Government Association, but was defeated.

Knox was active in Freemasonry, being a member of Duke of York Lodge No. 25 in Dublin. Knox died at his home in Dublin on 24 January 1873, of scarlet fever.

Parliament of the United Kingdom
Preceded by Richard Armstrong	Member of Parliament for Sligo; 1868 – 1870	Borough disenfranchised for corruption
