= Sullivan baronets of Garryduff (1881) =

Baronets of Garryduff
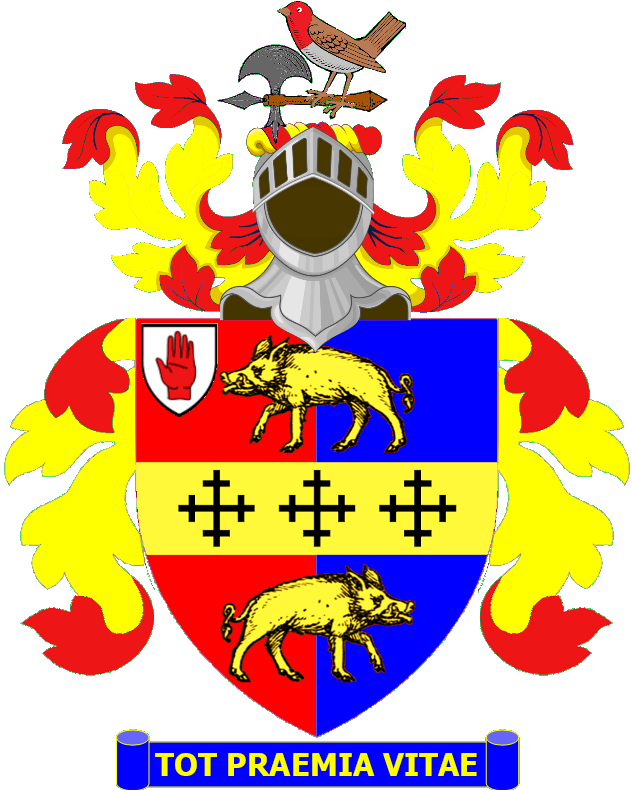
- Crest: A battleaxe fesswise thereon a robin proper.
- Shield: Per pale Gules and Azure a fess Or charged with three crosses-crosslet Sable between two boars passant Or that in chief facing the dexter and that in base the sinister.
- Motto: Tot Praemia Vitae (So Many Rewards of Life)

The Sullivan baronetcy, of Garryduff in the County of Cork, was created in the Baronetage of the United Kingdom on 29 December 1881 for the Irish lawyer and politician Edward Sullivan. He was Lord Chancellor of Ireland from 1883 to 1885. The title became extinct on the death of the third Baronet in 1937.

== Sullivan baronets, of Garryduff (1881) ==
- Sir Edward Sullivan, 1st Baronet (1822–1885)
- Sir Edward Sullivan, 2nd Baronet (1852–1928)
- Sir William Sullivan, 3rd Baronet (1860–1937)

== Notes ==
Baronetage of the United Kingdom
Preceded by Phillimore baronets	Sullivan baronets of Garryduff; 29 December 1881	Succeeded by Vivian baronets
