= Sligo (UK Parliament constituency) =

UK parliamentary constituency in Ireland, 1801 to 1870

- Former borough constituency for the House of Commons
- County: County Sligo
- Borough: Sligo

1801–1870
- Seats: 1
- Created from: Sligo (IHC)
- Replaced by: County Sligo

The parliamentary borough of Sligo, County Sligo, Ireland, was represented in the House of Commons of the United Kingdom as a borough constituency from 1801 to 1870 by one Member of Parliament (MP), elected by the first past the post system of election. It succeeded the two-seat constituency of Sligo represented in the Irish House of Commons until the abolition of the Irish Parliament on 1 January 1801 under the Acts of Union 1800. It was disfranchised under the Sligo and Cashel Disfranchisement Act 1870.

== Boundaries ==
Its boundaries were reviewed in January 1832 and found that there was no boundary to the borough defined by charter, but considered that it could be defined relative to the Sligo Town Government Act 1803. It was defined in the Parliamentary Boundaries (Ireland) Act 1832, which defined the area of the parliamentary borough as:

Such Part or Parts of the Town or Precincts of the Town of Sligo as lie or are situate within the Distance of One Mile, Irish Admeasurement, of a certain Spot in Market Street in said Town on which a Building or Erection formerly stood, called the Market Cross, being the Space defined in the Seventeenth Section of an Act passed in the Forty-third Year of the Reign of His Majesty King George the Third, intituled 'An Act for repealing so much of an Act made in the Third Year of the Reign of King George the Second, intituled 'An Act for cleansing the Ports, Harbours, and Rivers of the City of Cork, and of the Towns of Galway, Sligo, Drogheda, and Belfast, and for erecting a Ballast Office in the said City and each of the said Towns,' as relates to the Port and Harbour of the Town of Sligo; and for repealing an Act made in the Fortieth Year of the Reign of His present Majesty, intituled 'An Act for paving, cleansing, lighting, and improving the Streets, Quays, Lanes, and Passages in the Town of Sligo in the County of Sligo, for establishing a nightly Watch in the said Town for supplying the said Town with Pipe Water, and for improving and regulating the Port and Harbour thereof,' and for making better Provision for the paving, lighting, watching, cleansing, and improving of the said Town of Sligo, and for regulating the Porters and Carmen employed therein, and for the better Regulation and Improvement of the Port and Harbour thereof,' as the Part or Parts of the Precincts of the Town of Sligo which shall be or be deemed to be within the Intent and Purview of the said Act of the Forty-third Year of the Reign of King George the Third, for the several Purposes in the said Seventeenth Section specified.

Under the Representation of the People (Ireland) Act 1868, its boundaries were extended to include all of the municipal borough of Sligo. These had been defined in the Municipal Corporations (Ireland) Act 1840 as:

From the Northern Angle of the New Stone Quay called Ballast Bank, Eastward, in a straight Line to the Centre of the Bridge on the Road leading from Old Bridge across the Townland of Cartron to the Townland of Ballincan; thence, Eastward, in a straight Line to the Centre of the Bridge on the Road leading from Old Bridge to the Townland of Carcash; thence, South-eastward, in a straight Line to the North-eastern Angle of the Sligo Fever Hospital; thence, Southward, in a straight Line to the Point where the Boundary between the Townlands of Abbey Quarter and Cleveragh meets the Southern Bank of the River Garvoge; thence in a straight Line to the South-eastern Angle of the County Gaol Enclosure Wall; thence, South-westward, in a straight Line to the North-eastern Angle of the House called Peterville, on the Western Side of the Boyle Road; thence, North-westward, in a straight Line to the North-western Angle of the House called Rose Hill, now in the Occupation of Thomas Read, Esquire; thence, Northward, in a straight Line to the Point at which the North-western Face of Ballast Bank Quay terminates, being about Eighty Yards South-westward of the Point first described; thence along the North-western Face of such Quay to the Point first described.

== Abolition ==
Numerous elections were overturned on petition by the losing candidate; after the 1868 election was overturned, a Royal Commission established under the Parliamentary Elections Act 1868 examined the matter and reported that "at the last three elections of members to serve in Parliament for the Borough of Sligo, corrupt practices have extensively prevailed." Parliament passed the Sligo and Cashel Disfranchisement Act 1870 which was given royal assent on 1 August 1870. The act disfranchised Sligo as well as Cashel, another Irish borough. The area of Sligo became part of the County Sligo constituency. In 1881 Thomas Sexton, one of two MPs for County Sligo, introduced a private member's bill to re-enfranchise the borough, which was defeated on second reading.

== Members of Parliament ==
Election	MP	Party	Note
1 January 1801	Owen Wynne	Tory	Resigned (appointed Escheator of Munster)
16 July 1806	Col. George Canning	Tory	A cousin of his successor Rt Hon George Canning
5 November 1812	Rt Hon George Canning	Tory	1812: Also returned by and elected to sit for Liverpool. Subsequently, Prime Minister 1827.
5 April 1813	Joshua Spencer		Resigned (appointed Escheator of Munster)
27 March 1815	Sir Brent Spencer		
29 June 1818	John Bent	Tory	
21 March 1820	Owen Wynne	Tory	
4 August 1830	John Arthur Wynne	Tory	
21 December 1832	John Martin	Whig	
5 August 1837	John Patrick Somers	Whig	There were many disturbances in the election campaign.
9 July 1841	John Patrick Somers	Repeal	Unseated on petition - new writ issued
11 April 1848	Charles Towneley	Whig	Unseated on petition - new writ issued.
15 July 1848	John Patrick Somers	Repeal	
15 July 1852	Charles Towneley	Independent Irish	Unseated on petition - new writ issued. Henry Stonor, convicted of electoral bribery, was later appointed a judge in Victoria, Australia, The Stonor scandal inspired the character of Mr Romer in Anthony Trollope's Doctor Thorne.
8 July 1853	John Sadleir	Whig	Died.
8 March 1856	Rt Hon. John Arthur Wynne	Conservative	Election upheld after petitions were rejected.
2 April 1857	John Patrick Somers	Whig	Unseated on petition.
31 July 1857	Rt Hon. John Arthur Wynne	Conservative	Declared duly elected on petition. Resigned
9 August 1860	Francis Macdonogh	Conservative	
15 July 1865	Richard Armstrong	Liberal	
20 November 1868	Lawrence Edward Knox	Conservative	Election declared void on petition.
1 August 1870	Constituency disenfranchised		

Supplemental Note:-

- ^{1} Walker (like F. W. S. Craig in his compilations of election results for Great Britain) classifies Whig, Radical and similar candidates as Liberals from 1832. The name Liberal was gradually adopted as a description for the Whigs and politicians allied with them, before the formal creation of the Liberal Party shortly after the 1859 general election.

== Elections ==
=== Elections in the 1830s ===
General election 1830: Sligo
Party	Candidate	Votes	%
Tory	John Arthur Wynne	Unopposed	
Registered electors		13	
Tory hold			

General election 1831: Sligo
Party	Candidate	Votes	%
Tory	John Arthur Wynne	Unopposed	
Registered electors		13	
Tory hold			

General election 1832: Sligo
Party	Candidate	Votes	%
Whig	John Martin	213	53.7
Tory	John Arthur Wynne	159	40.1
Whig	Gregory Cuffe Martin	20	5.0
Whig	Robert Jones	5	1.3
Majority		54	13.6
Turnout		397	95.0
Registered electors		418	
Whig gain from Tory			

General election 1835: Sligo
Party	Candidate	Votes	%
Whig	John Martin	Unopposed	
Registered electors		694	
Whig hold			

General election 1837: Sligo
Party	Candidate	Votes	%
Whig	John Patrick Somers	262	55.7
Whig	John Martin	208	44.3
Majority		54	11.6
Turnout		470	56.2
Registered electors		837	
Whig hold			

=== Elections in the 1840s ===
General election 1841: Sligo
Party	Candidate	Votes	%	±%
Repeal	John Patrick Somers	Unopposed		
Registered electors		821		
Repeal gain from Whig				

General election 1847: Sligo
Party	Candidate	Votes	%	±%
Repeal	John Patrick Somers	Unopposed		
Registered electors		910		
Repeal hold				

On petition, Somers was unseated, causing a by-election.

By-election, 11 April 1848: Sligo
Party	Candidate	Votes	%	±%
Whig	Charles Towneley	130	52.6	New
Repeal	John Patrick Somers	117	47.4	N/A
Majority		13	5.2	N/A
Turnout		247	29.5 (est)	N/A
Registered electors		837 (1847 figure)		
Whig gain from Repeal		Swing	N/A	

On petition, Towneley was unseated, causing a further by-election.

By-election, 15 July 1848: Sligo
Party	Candidate	Votes	%	±%
Repeal	John Patrick Somers	102	36.6	−10.8
Conservative	James Hartley	90	32.3	New
Whig	John Ball	87	31.2	−21.4
Majority		12	4.3	N/A
Turnout		279	30.7	+1.2
Registered electors		910		
Repeal gain from Whig		Swing	+5.3	

=== Elections in the 1850s ===
General election 1852: Sligo
Party	Candidate	Votes	%	±%
Independent Irish	Charles Towneley	147	57.6	New
Whig	John Patrick Somers	108	42.4	N/A
Majority		39	15.2	N/A
Turnout		255	75.9	N/A
Registered electors		336		
Independent Irish gain from Repeal		Swing	N/A	

On petition, Towneley was unseated on 6 June 1853 due to bribery by his agents, causing a by-election.

By-election, 8 July 1853: Sligo
Party	Candidate	Votes	%	±%
Whig	John Sadleir	150	51.4	N/A
Whig	John Patrick Somers	142	48.6	+6.2
Majority		8	2.8	N/A
Turnout		292	83.2	+7.3
Registered electors		351		
Whig gain from Independent Irish		Swing	N/A	

Sadleir's death caused a by-election.

By-election, 8 March 1856: Sligo
Party	Candidate	Votes	%	±%
Conservative	John Arthur Wynne	148	55.8	New
Whig	John Patrick Somers	117	44.2	+1.8
Majority		31	11.6	N/A
Turnout		265	76.8	+0.9
Registered electors		345		
Conservative gain from Independent Irish		Swing		

General election 1857: Sligo
Party	Candidate	Votes	%	±%
Whig	John Patrick Somers	150	51.0	+8.6
Conservative	John Arthur Wynne	144	49.0	N/A
Majority		6	2.0	N/A
Turnout		294	85.2	+9.3
Registered electors		345		
Whig gain from Independent Irish		Swing		

On petition, the poll was amended due to improperly recorded votes, leaving Wynne with 148 votes and Somers with 147 votes. Wynne was then declared elected on 31 July 1857.

General election 1859: Sligo
Party	Candidate	Votes	%	±%
Conservative	John Arthur Wynne	177	70.0	+21.0
Liberal	John Patrick Somers	73	28.9	−22.1
Liberal	Lucas Alexander Treston	3	1.2	N/A
Majority		104	41.1	N/A
Turnout		253	70.1	−15.1
Registered electors		361		
Conservative gain from Liberal		Swing	+21.6	

=== Elections in the 1860s ===
Wynne's resignation caused a by-election.

By-election, 9 August 1860: Sligo
Party	Candidate	Votes	%	±%
Conservative	Francis Macdonogh	160	95.8	+25.8
Liberal	John Reilly	5	3.0	+1.8
Liberal	John Patrick Somers	2	1.2	−27.7
Majority		155	92.8	+41.7
Turnout		167	46.3	−23.8
Registered electors		361		
Conservative hold		Swing	+26.8	

General election 1865: Sligo
Party	Candidate	Votes	%	±%
Liberal	Richard Armstrong	166	51.7	+21.6
Conservative	Francis Macdonogh	155	48.3	−21.7
Majority		11	3.4	N/A
Turnout		321	84.7	+14.6
Registered electors		379		
Liberal gain from Conservative		Swing	+21.7	

General election 1868: Sligo
Party	Candidate	Votes	%	±%
Conservative	Lawrence E. Knox	241	51.3	+3.0
Liberal	John Woulfe Flanagan	229	48.7	−3.0
Majority		12	2.6	N/A
Turnout		470	90.4	+5.7
Registered electors		520		
Conservative gain from Liberal		Swing	+3.0	

Knox's election was declared void on 2 March 1869, and no writ was issued to find a replacement MP. The seat was then disenfranchised on 1 August 1870, and absorbed into County Sligo.
