= 1868 United Kingdom general election in Ireland =

- 17 November – 7 December 1868

105 of the 652 seats to the House of Commons
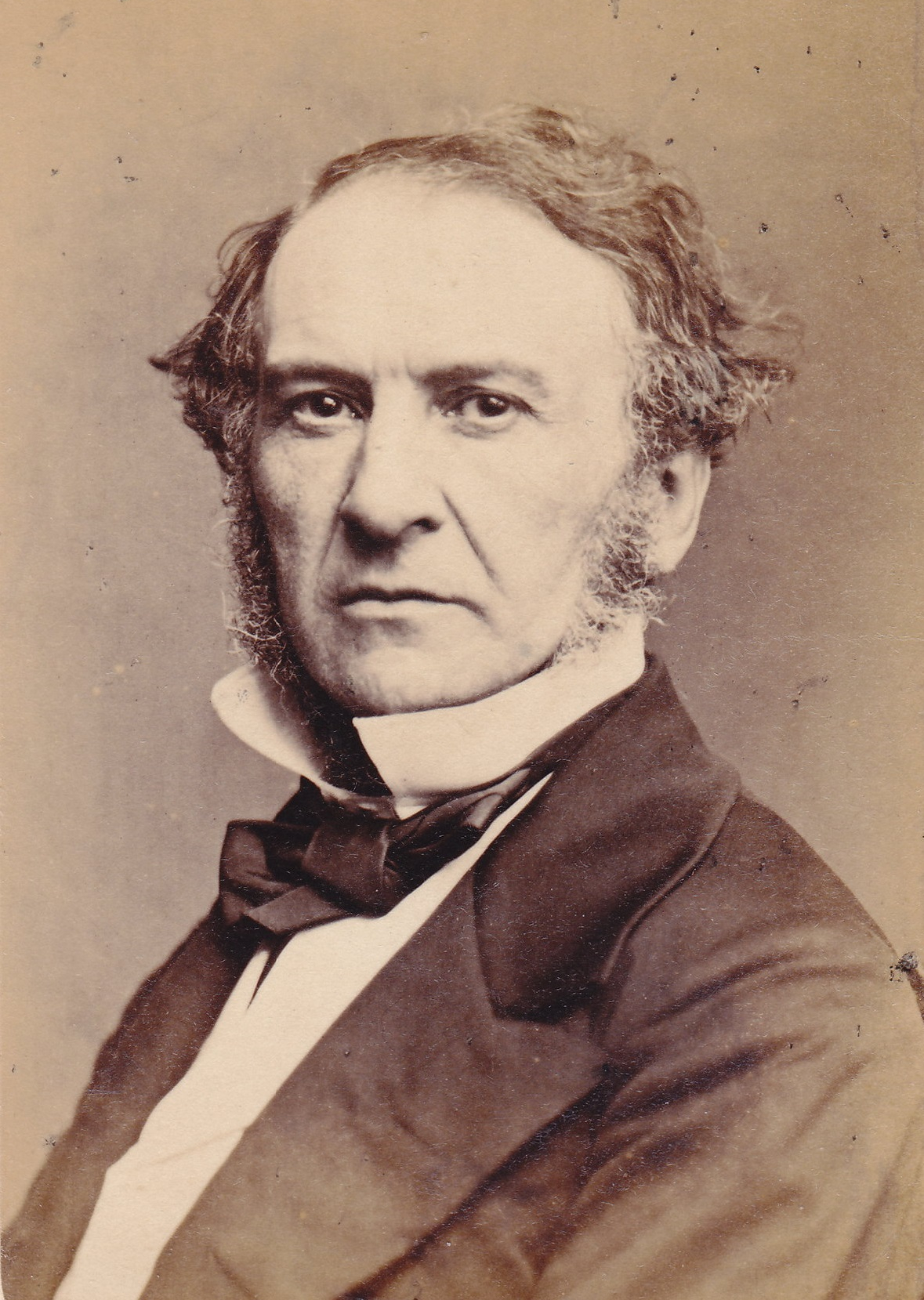

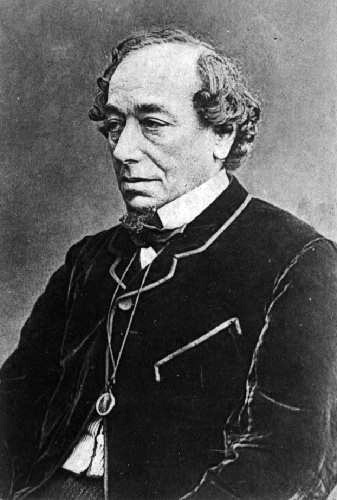
	First party	Second party
Leader	William Ewart Gladstone	Benjamin Disraeli
Party	Liberal	Conservative
Leader since	3 December 1868	27 February 1868
Leader's seat	Greenwich	Buckinghamshire
Seats before	58	47
Seats won	66	39
Seat change	▲8	▼8
Popular vote	54,461	38,765
Percentage	57.9%	41.9%
Swing	▲2.3%	▼2.5%
- Results of the 1868 election in Ireland

The 1868 United Kingdom general election in Ireland resulted in the Liberals under Gladstone strengthening their control over Ireland, particularly the south. It was the first election following the Representation of the People (Ireland) Act 1868.

A key focus of the Liberal campaign was on their proposal to disestablish the Church of Ireland. The Church of Ireland's official role, as the Protestant national church of a Catholic majority country, had long proved controversial. The Tithe War of the 1830s had largely resulted in the abolition of tithes, which had been levied on Ireland's population (both Protestants and Catholics) to fund the Church of Ireland. Disestablishment was popular both in Ireland, and also amongst non-conformists and the Irish diaspora in Britain, particularly in the Celtic Fringe. This policy would be enacted following the election by the Irish Church Act 1869.

The election marked the high-water point of the Liberals in Ireland, and within 17 years they would have no seats at all in Ireland.

== Results ==
Party	Candidates	Unopposed	Seats Won	Seats change	Votes	%	% Change
Liberal	85	41	66	▲8	54,461	57.9	▲2.3
Irish Conservative	53	26	39	▼8	38,765	41.9	▼2.5
Others	2	0	0	Steady	188	0.2	▲0.2
Total	140	67	105		149,341	100	

The results from Dublin University, which returned two Conservatives to parliament, is not included in the vote total.

Popular vote
Liberal	58.30%
Irish Conservative	41.50%
Others	0.20%

Parliamentary seats
Liberal	62.86%
Irish Conservative	37.14%

Following election petitions in Cashel, won by the Liberal Party, and Sligo, won by the Conservative Party, the MPs were unseated. Under the Sligo and Cashel Disfranchisement Act 1870, both boroughs lost their right to elect MPs.

== See also ==
- History of Ireland (1801–1923)
