= Mallow (UK Parliament constituency) =

UK parliamentary constituency in Ireland, 1801–1885

- Former borough constituency for the House of Commons
- County: County Cork
- Borough: Mallow

1801–1885
- Seats: 1
- Created from: Mallow (IHC)
- Replaced by: North East Cork

Mallow was a United Kingdom Parliament constituency in Ireland, returning one MP from 1801 to 1885.

== History ==
Prior to the Union, the Mallow constituency had been represented in the Irish House of Commons. It was an original constituency represented in Parliament when the Union of Great Britain and Ireland took effect on 1 January 1801.

It was disfranchised under the Redistribution of Seats Act 1885, which took effect at the 1885 general election. It was absorbed into the North East Cork constituency.

== Boundaries ==
This constituency was a parliamentary borough based on the town of Mallow in County Cork. From the 1801 union until 1832, the boundaries and franchise were the same as in the predecessor Irish Parliament constituency, namely all freeholders within the manor of Mallow. The manor comprised the portion of the civil parish of Mallow north of the River Blackwater, as well as three townlands south of the Blackwater – namely Lower (or North) Quartertown, Upper (or South) Quartertown, and Gortnagraiga – which constituted the portion of the civil parish of Mourne Abbey within the barony of Fermoy. For all Irish borough constituencies, the Representation of the People (Ireland) Act 1832 changed the franchise and the ancillary Parliamentary Boundaries (Ireland) Act 1832 defined new boundaries, in most cases accepting the recommendations of a committee appointed the previous year. Mallow was one such case, despite protests from the gentry who would be disenfranchised. The new boundary was:

From the Easternmost Gate Post (opposite the Park Wall of Mr. [Richard Harris-]Purcell) of a Field on the Kanturk Road, the Entrance to which is distant about One hundred and seventy-six Yards (measured along the Kanturk Road) from the Seneschal's House, in a straight Line to the Gate Post nearest the Turnpike in a Wall on the Southern Side of the old Road which runs a little to the North of the Limerick Road, and which Post is distant about Two hundred and forty-two Yards (measured along the said old Road) to the North-west of the Turnpike; thence in a straight Line to the Point at which a Bye Lane joins the Fair-lane Road, about One hundred and fifty Yards to the North of the Entrance to the Lime and Salt Works; thence in a straight Line to the Point at which the Carrigoon Road, which passes under Mr. [Denham] Jephson's Park Wall, is met by a Fence which divides a Field occupied by Mr. Lynch from a Field occupied by Mr. Carmichael, and which Point is also about Three hundred and seventy-five Yards to the North of a small Door in the Park Wall; thence in a straight Line across the Park to the Westernmost Point at which the Boundary of Mr. [Robert] Delacour's Pleasure Grounds meets the Fermoy Road; thence, Westward, along the Boundary of Mr. Delacour's Pleasure Grounds to the Southernmost Point at which the same meets the Boundary of the Garden attached to the Water Mill; thence in a straight Line to a Point in the old Cork Road which is distant Two hundred and twenty-five Yards (measured along the old Cork Road) to the South of the old Turnpike thereon; thence in a straight Line to a Point on the new Cork Road which is distant about Two hundred and ninety Yards (measured along the new Cork Road) to the South of the said old Turnpike, and which Point is at the Commencement of a Nursery Ground; thence in a straight Line in the Direction of the Eastern Corner of Captain Davis's House to the Point at which such straight Line cuts the Blackwater River; thence in a straight Line to the Gate Post first described.

This excluded a large rural hinterland but included the Ballydaheen suburb immediately south of the Blackwater. The new boundary appears on the Ordnance Survey of Ireland's 1878 town plan of Mallow.

== Members of Parliament ==
Election	Member	Party	Note
1801, 1 January	John Longfield		1801: Co-opted
1802, 13 July	Denham Jephson	Whig	
1812, 16 October	Sir James Cotter, Bt		
1818, 27 June	William Becher	Whig	
1826, 16 June	Denham Jephson	Whig	First term
1832, 16 June	William Daunt	Repeal Association	Unseated on petition
1833, 24 April	Denham Jephson	Whig	Declared elected. Second term (new surname 1838).
1859, 6 May	Robert Longfield	Conservative	
1865, 13 July	Rt Hon. Edward Sullivan	Liberal	Appointed Master of the Rolls in Ireland
1870, 3 February	Henry Munster	Liberal	Unseated on petition and new writ issued
1870, 10 May	George Waters	Liberal	Appointed chairman, County Waterford Quarter Sessions
1872, 7 June	William Felix Munster	Liberal	
1874, 4 February	John George MacCarthy	Home Rule League	
1880, 2 April	Rt Hon. William Moore Johnson	Liberal	Appointed a Judge of the High Court in Ireland
1883, 24 January	William O'Brien	Home Rule League	Last MP for the constituency
1885	Constituency abolished		

== Elections ==
=== Elections in the 1830s ===
General election 1830: Mallow
Party	Candidate	Votes	%
Whig	Denham Jephson	Unopposed	
Whig hold			

General election 1831: Mallow
Party	Candidate	Votes	%
Whig	Denham Jephson	Unopposed	
Registered electors		560	
Whig hold			

General election 1832: Mallow
Party	Candidate	Votes	%
Repeal	William Joseph O'Neill Daunt	225	51.1
Whig	Denham Jephson	215	48.9
Majority		10	2.2
Turnout		440	96.1
Registered electors		458	
Repeal gain from Whig			

- On petition, 11 votes were struck off of Daunt's total and Jephson was declared elected.

General election 1835: Mallow
Party	Candidate	Votes	%
Whig	Denham Jephson	Unopposed	
Registered electors		474	
Whig gain from Repeal			

General election 1837: Mallow
Party	Candidate	Votes	%
Whig	Denham Jephson-Norreys	Unopposed	
Registered electors		564	
Whig hold			

=== Elections in the 1840s ===
General election 1841: Mallow
Party	Candidate	Votes	%	±%
Whig	Denham Jephson-Norreys	111	68.1	N/A
Conservative	Richard Longfield	52	31.9	New
Majority		59	36.2	N/A
Turnout		163	48.5	N/A
Registered electors		336		
Whig hold		Swing	N/A	

General election 1847: Mallow
Party	Candidate	Votes	%	±%
Whig	Denham Jephson-Norreys	75	55.6	−12.5
Conservative	David Ross	60	44.4	+12.5
Majority		15	11.2	−25.0
Turnout		135	35.1	−13.4
Registered electors		385		
Whig hold		Swing	−12.5	

=== Elections in the 1850s ===
General election 1852: Mallow
Party	Candidate	Votes	%	±%
Whig	Denham Jephson-Norreys	59	57.3	+1.7
Conservative	Charles Stannard Eustace	44	42.7	−1.7
Majority		15	14.6	+3.4
Turnout		103	72.0	+36.9
Registered electors		143		
Whig hold		Swing	+1.7	

General election 1857: Mallow
Party	Candidate	Votes	%	±%
Whig	Denham Jephson-Norreys	Unopposed		
Registered electors		164		
Whig hold				

General election 1859: Mallow
Party	Candidate	Votes	%	±%
Conservative	Robert Longfield	68	55.3	New
Liberal	Denham Jephson-Norreys	55	44.7	N/A
Majority		13	10.6	N/A
Turnout		123	81.5	N/A
Registered electors		151		
Conservative gain from Liberal		Swing	N/A	

=== Elections in the 1860s ===
General election 1865: Mallow
Party	Candidate	Votes	%	±%
Liberal	Edward Sullivan	Unopposed		
Registered electors		171		
Liberal gain from Conservative				

General election 1868: Mallow
Party	Candidate	Votes	%	±%
Liberal	Edward Sullivan	Unopposed		
Registered electors		208		
Liberal hold				

Sullivan was appointed Attorney-General for Ireland, requiring a by-election.

By-election, 4 January 1869: Mallow
Party	Candidate	Votes	%	±%
Liberal	Edward Sullivan	Unopposed		
Registered electors		208		
Liberal hold				

=== Elections in the 1870s ===
Sullivan was appointed Master of the Rolls in Ireland, causing a by-election.

By-election, 3 Feb 1870: Mallow
Party	Candidate	Votes	%	±%
Liberal	Henry Munster	91	52.3	N/A
Conservative	Lawrence E. Knox	83	47.7	New
Majority		8	4.6	N/A
Turnout		174	83.7	N/A
Registered electors		208		
Liberal hold		Swing	N/A	

Knox stated his intention to petition the return on the basis of bribery and intimidation of the electorate. The petition was successful and a by-election was called.

By-election, 10 May 1870: Mallow
Party	Candidate	Votes	%	±%
Liberal	George Waters	93	52.2	−0.1
Home Rule	Lawrence E. Knox	85	47.8	N/A
Majority		8	4.4	−0.2
Turnout		178	85.6	+1.9
Registered electors		208		
Liberal hold		Swing		

Waters was appointment Chairman of Quarter Sessions of County Waterford.

By-election, 7 June 1872: Mallow
Party	Candidate	Votes	%	±%
Liberal	William Felix Munster	91	53.8	+1.6
Home Rule	John George MacCarthy	78	46.2	−1.6
Majority		13	7.6	+3.2
Turnout		169	74.1	N/A
Registered electors		228		
Liberal hold		Swing		

General election 1874: Mallow
Party	Candidate	Votes	%	±%
Home Rule	John George MacCarthy	86	39.8	N/A
Liberal	William Moore Johnson	64	29.6	N/A
Conservative	Kilner Arthur Augustus Brazier-Creagh	57	26.4	N/A
Home Rule	David Augustus Nagle	9	4.2	N/A
Majority		22	10.2	N/A
Turnout		216	86.4	N/A
Registered electors		250		
Home Rule gain from Liberal		Swing		

=== Elections in the 1880s ===
General election 1880: Mallow
Party	Candidate	Votes	%	±%
Liberal	William Moore Johnson	189	72.4	+42.8
Conservative	Robert Webb	72	27.6	+1.2
Majority		117	44.8	N/A
Turnout		261	89.1	+2.7
Registered electors		293		
Liberal gain from Home Rule		Swing		

Johnson was appointed Solicitor-General for Ireland, requiring a by-election.

By-election, 17 May 1880: Mallow
Party	Candidate	Votes	%	±%
Liberal	William Moore Johnson	201	79.4	+7.0
Home Rule	Richard Wood Kelly	52	20.6	New
Majority		149	58.8	+14.0
Turnout		253	86.3	−2.8
Registered electors		293		
Liberal hold		Swing		

Johnson was appointed a judge and resigned, causing a by-election.

By-election, 24 Jan 1883: Mallow
Party	Candidate	Votes	%	±%
Irish Parliamentary	William O'Brien	161	64.4	N/A
Liberal	John Naish	89	35.6	−36.8
Majority		72	28.8	N/A
Turnout		250	87.1	−2.0
Registered electors		287		
Irish Parliamentary gain from Liberal		Swing		
