= Sir Edward Sullivan, 1st Baronet =

British politician

Sir Edward Sullivan, 1st Baronet, PC (Ire) (10 July 1822 – 13 April 1885) was an Irish lawyer, and a Liberal Member of Parliament for Mallow, 1865–1870 in the House of Commons of the United Kingdom of Great Britain and Ireland. He was also Solicitor General for Ireland, 1865–1866, Attorney General for Ireland, 1868, Master of the Rolls in Ireland, 1870. Created a baronet, 29 December 1881, from 1883 to 1885 he was Lord Chancellor of Ireland.

== Early life and education ==
Edward Sullivan was born in Mallow, County Cork, on 10 July 1822. He was the eldest son of Edward Sullivan by his wife Anne Surflen, née Lynch, widow of John Surflen. His father was a prosperous local wine merchant, and a friend of the poet Thomas Moore. Sullivan was educated at Midleton and Portora Royal School, and in 1841 he entered Trinity College Dublin. He was elected a Scholar in 1843, and graduated B.A. in 1845. He was also elected auditor of the College Historical Society in 1845, in succession to William Connor Magee (afterwards Bishop of Peterborough and Archbishop of York), and gained the gold medal for oratory.

== Legal and political career ==
In 1848, Sullivan was called to the bar; within ten years (1858) he was appointed a Queen's Counsel, and two years later, became a Serjeant-at-law (Ireland). Due to his diminutive stature, he was known as "the Little Serjeant", in contrast to Richard Armstrong, "the Big Serjeant".

In 1861 he was appointed Law Adviser to the Lord Lieutenant of Ireland, and in 1865 became Solicitor-General for Ireland in Lord Palmerston's last administration.

In 1865 he was elected as the Liberal Party MP for Mallow. From 1866 to 1868, while his party was in opposition, he focused on his legal career, working with James Whiteside, as leading counsel for the plaintiff in the Yelverton case; his cross-examination of Major Yelverton, later William Yelverton, 4th Viscount Avonmore, in that case is considered one of the finest examples of forensic skill in the history of the Irish Bar. In December 1868, on the return of the Liberal Party to power, Sullivan became Attorney-General for Ireland in William Gladstone's first administration.

He retired from parliament in 1870 to become Master of the Rolls in Ireland. In December 1881 Sullivan was created a baronet, Sir Edward Sullivan of Garryduff, Cork. In 1883, he succeeded Hugh Law as Irish Lord Chancellor. Sir Edward Sullivan died suddenly at his house in Dublin on 13 April 1885. His widow died in 1898.

== Family and personal life ==
Sullivan married, on 24 September 1850, Elizabeth Josephine (Bessie) Bailey, daughter of the wealthy landowner Robert Bailey of Passage West, County Cork. Bessie's sister Margaret married another prominent politician from Cork, John Francis Maguire. It was a mixed marriage, Edward being a Protestant and Bessie a Roman Catholic. They had four sons and a daughter. Their children included:

- Sir Edward Sullivan, 2nd Baronet (1852–1928), publisher of the 1914 edition of the Book of Kells.
- Sir William Sullivan, 3rd Baronet (1860-1937), married Charlotte Dowse, daughter of Richard Dowse, Baron of the Court of Exchequer (Ireland).
- Blessed Fr John Sullivan SJ (1861–1933), who converted to Catholicism in 1896 and became a Jesuit priest in 1907.
- Anne (died 1918).

The family lived at 41 Eccles Street, Dublin. It seems that the boys were raised in their father's religion, and the only daughter Anne in her mother's. Sullivan was a book collector, classical scholar, and linguist.

== Reputation ==
Elrington Ball called him an immensely influential figure in Irish politics and the dominant figure among the Irish judiciary; his baronetcy was regarded as a belated reward for the enormous assistance he gave to the British Government during a particularly disturbed period in Irish politics. His influence over judicial appointments, while he was Lord Chancellor, was said to be almost unlimited.

== Arms ==
Coat of arms of Sir Edward Sullivan, 1st Baronet
Crest A battleaxe fesswise thereon a robin proper. Escutcheon Per pale Gules and Azure a fess Or charged with three crosses-crosslet Sable between two boars passant Or that in chief facing the dexter and that in base the sinister. Motto Tot Praemia Vitae (So Many Rewards Of Life)

Parliament of the United Kingdom
Preceded by Robert Longfield	Member of Parliament for Mallow; 1865–1870	Succeeded by Henry Munster
Legal offices
Preceded by Thomas O'Hagan	Third Serjeant of Ireland; 1860–1861	Succeeded by Richard Armstrong
Preceded by James Anthony Lawson	Second Serjeant of Ireland; 1861–1865	Succeeded by Richard Armstrong
Preceded by James Anthony Lawson	Solicitor General for Ireland; 1865–1866	Succeeded by Michael Morris
Preceded by John Thomas Ball	Attorney General for Ireland; 1868–1870	Succeeded by Charles Robert Barry
Preceded by John Edward Walsh	Master of the Rolls in Ireland; 1870–1883	Succeeded by Andrew Marshall Porter
Preceded by Hugh Law	Lord Chancellor of Ireland; 1883–1885	Succeeded by John Naish
Baronetage of the United Kingdom
New creation	Baronet (of Garryduff); 1881–1885	Succeeded by Edward Sullivan
