= Henry Munster =

British lawyer, sportsman, and Liberal politician

Henry Munster (13 October 1823 – 11 April 1894) was a British lawyer, sportsman and Liberal politician who was unseated at his only attempt at election to the House of Commons.

Munster was born in London, the only son of Frederick Munster formerly of Port Royal, Jamaica. He was educated at King's College School and admitted to Trinity College, Cambridge on 27 February 1841. In 1845 Munster was cox of the winning Cambridge boat in the Boat Race. The crew also won the Grand Challenge Cup at Henley Royal Regatta. Munster was admitted at Inner Temple on 28 April 1843 and called to the Bar on 1 May 1848. He was a special pleader on the Sussex Sessions. Munster played various cricket matches between 1851 and 1854 for Gentlemen of England and Gentlemen of Sussex. He played one first-class cricket match for Gentlemen of England at Hove in September 1853. He made little contribution in the game being out twice for a duck, once to John Wisden.

In 1870 at a by-election, Munster was elected as Liberal Member of Parliament for Mallow but shortly after he was unseated on petition, on account of bribery by his agent. Munster lived at Abbey View, Cashel, Tipperary. In 1884 Munster was involved in an unusual case concerning privilege against disclosure after he was libelled in The Brightonian. The publisher had sought information from his solicitor on how to commit a crime to avoid payment, and the solicitor was called in as a prosecution witness when the scam was discovered. Munster died at Plumpton, East Sussex at the age of 70.

== See also ==
- List of Cambridge University Boat Race crews
