= William Cary (MP) =

English Tory politician (c.1661–1710)

William Cary (c. 1661 – September/October 1710) was an English Tory politician who represented constituencies in the House of Commons of England and the House of Commons of Great Britain.

== Biography ==
Cary was the second son of Doctor George Cary, Dean of Exeter, and Mary Hancock, a daughter of William Hancock of Combe Martin, Devon. He was returned to the Loyal Parliament as the Member of Parliament for Okehampton. Between 1685 and 1688 he served as recorder of Okehampton in succession to his elder brother, Sir George Cary. At the Glorious Revolution in 1688, Cary was quick to join William of Orange after his landing in Devon. He was returned to the House of Commons as the MP for Okehampton at the 1690 English general election, where he was identified as a Tory and a supporter of Lord Carmarthen. Cary was elected to represent Launceston in 1695. Cary initially refused to sign the Association of 1696 and was consequently removed from the local commission of the peace, and he voted against the attainder of Sir John Fenwick, 3rd Baronet.

Cary continued to represent Launceston until his death in 1710. By December 1701, he was listed as a supporter of Robert Harley. In February 1702 he was among the members vindicating the Commons' proceedings in the previous session in the impeachments of the Whig Junto. During Queen Anne's reign Cary remained consistent in his Tory sympathies. In 1704 he obtained a private act of Parliament, Carey's Estate Act 1703 (2 & 3 Ann. c. 33 Pr.), to allow him to sell entailed lands in Somerset and to re-settle his Devon estates in order to pay debts and provide incomes for his younger children. He was among the Tory Tackers in 1704 and an analysis of the 1705 Parliament classed Cary as 'True Church'. In 1710 he voted against the impeachment of Henry Sacheverell. He had died by the time of the 1710 British general election.

Parliament of England
Preceded by Sir Arthur Harris, Bt; Sir George Cary	Member of Parliament for Okehampton with Simon Leach (1685–1687); Henry Northleigh (1689–1694); John Burrington (1694–1695); 1685–1695	Succeeded by John Burrington; Thomas Northmore
Preceded by Lord Hyde; Bernard Granville	Member of Parliament for Launceston with Lord Hyde; 1695–1710	Succeeded by Lord Hyde; Francis Scobell
