= William Harris (MP, died 1709) =

English landowner and politician

William Harris (c. 1652 – 17 October 1709), of Hayne, Devon, was an English landowner and Whig politician who sat in the English and British House of Commons between 1690 and 1709.

== Early life ==
Harris was the eldest son of Christopher Harris of Hayne, Devon and Kenegie in Gulval, Cornwall and his wife Elizabeth Trott, daughter of Martin Trott of Langridge, Devon. While nothing is known about his educational background, on 12 May 1682 he and three other men (including John Tredenham) were granted a patent for a new device to drain water out of mines, in particular the Cornish tin mines. On 4 October 1685, he married Jane St Aubyn daughter of John St Aubyn of Clowance, Cornwall. In 1687, Harris succeeded to the estate of Hayne on the death of his father who had inherited it the previous year from his cousin, Sir Arthur Harris, 1st Baronet, of Stowford.

== Career ==
At the 1690 English general election, Harris was returned as Member of Parliament for St Ives and was listed as a Whig by Lord Carmarthen, and seen as a probable supporter of the Carmarthen Ministry if it were to come under attack. In 1691 Harris took his first leave of absence on grounds of ill-health, a pattern that continued throughout his parliamentary career. He did not stand for re-election at the 1695 English general election. He remained active in local politics, becoming a councilman in the new Plymouth corporation in 1696. At the 1698 English general election he was returned unopposed as MP for Okehampton, where his family had an interest, and was classed as a Country Whig. He was returned unopposed for Okehampton at the two general elections of 1701 and by December 1701 was regarded as having become more or less a Tory. He did not stand at the 1702 English general election, but served as High Sheriff of Devon for the year 1703 to 1704 and became Deputy Lieutenant for Devon in March 1705. He was defeated in a contest at Okehampton at the 1705 English general election. At the 1708 British general election he was returned unopposed again. The Whigs were unable to work out his political inclinations, but judged him a better choice than the Tory incumbent Thomas Northmore.

== Death and legacy ==
Harris died on 17 October 1709 aged 57. He and his wife had three sons - Christopher, John and William, and one daughter, Jane. He was succeeded in Parliament by his son Christopher, who was also his executor.

Parliament of England
Preceded by Walter Vincent	Member of Parliament for St Ives; 1690 – 1695; With: James Praed	Succeeded by John Michell
Preceded by John Burrington	Member of Parliament for Okehampton; 1698 – 1702; With: Thomas Northmore	Succeeded by Sir Simon Leach
Parliament of Great Britain
Preceded by Thomas Northmore	Member of Parliament for Okehampton; 1708 – 1709; With: John Dibble	Succeeded by Christopher Harris
