= John Burrington =

English Whig politician (1634–c.1707)

John Burrington (1634 – c. 1707) was an English Whig politician.

== Biography ==
Burrington was born into an old Devon gentry family, the eldest son of John Burrington and Susan Taylor of Chudleigh and Holliscombe. During the early stages of the Glorious Revolution, in his capacity as a major in the militia, Burrington played a decisive role in persuading the gentlemen of Devon to join the Prince of Orange following the Prince's landing at Brixham on 5 November 1688. At a by-election in February 1694, Burrington was returned as a Member of Parliament for Okehampton and in May the following year he was appointed a Victualling Commissioner, worth £400 per year. He was returned unopposed at the 1695 English general election. He was generally aligned with the Court Whig faction and was quick to sign the Association of 1696. In November 1696 he supported the attainder of Sir John Fenwick, 3rd Baronet. In March 1698, Burrington handled the latter stages of a bill to provide Crediton, near his estate, with a workhouse. He did not stand for election at the 1698 English general election. Two months after the succession of Queen Anne in March 1702, he was removed from his office as a Victualling Commissioner. Burrington's date of death is unknown, but he was dead by the time of his wife Mary's burial in March 1708.

Parliament of England
Preceded by Henry Northleigh; William Cary	Member of Parliament for Okehampton with William Cary (1694–1695); Thomas Northmore (1695–1698); 1694–1698	Succeeded by William Harris; Thomas Northmore
