= Gwyllym Lloyd Wardle =

British politician

Gwyllym Lloyd Wardle (c. 1762–1833) was a Welsh Lt. Colonel in the dragoons under Sir Watkin Williams-Wynn, and a member of parliament. He brought charges against Prince Frederick, Duke of York and Albany, and owned an interest in a gin distillery, being a business partner of MP William Madocks.

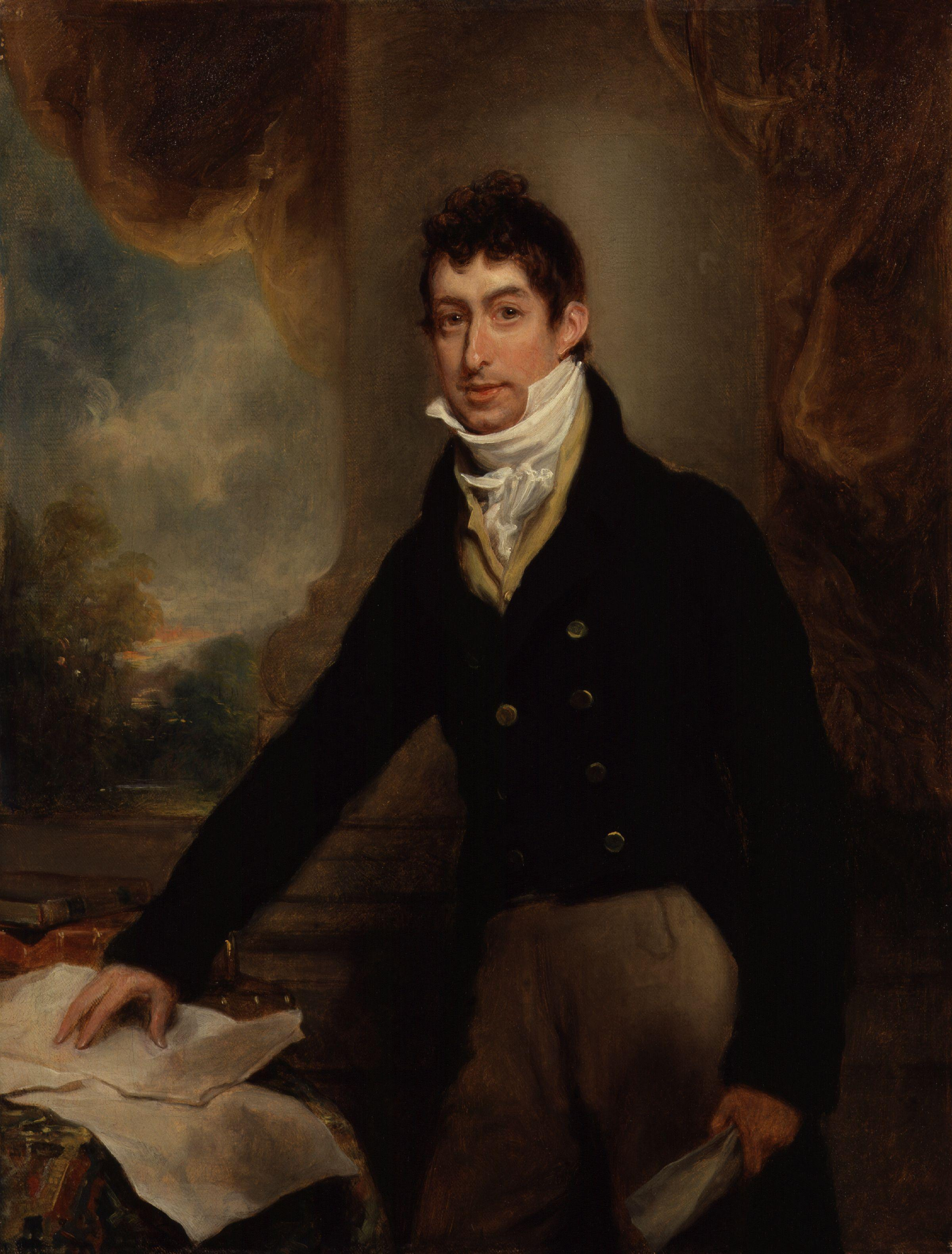
Gwyllym Lloyd Wardle, 1809 portrait by Arthur William Devis

== Early life ==
Born at Chester about 1762, he was the only son of Francis Wardle, J.P., of Hartsheath, near Mold, Flintshire, and Catherine, daughter of Richard Lloyd Gwyllym. He was during 1775 at Harrow School, but left in poor health; he was then at the school of George Henry Glasse at Greenford, near Ealing, Middlesex. He was admitted pensioner at St John's College, Cambridge, on 12 February 1780, but did not take a degree.

After travelling on the continent of Europe, Wardle settled at Hartsheath. He went into business with William Alexander Madocks, in particular at Tremadog.

== Military career ==
When Sir Watkin Williams-Wynn, 5th Baronet raised a troop of dragoons, officially called "the ancient British Light Dragoons",' and popularly known as "Wynn's Lambs", Wardle served in it, in Ireland. He is said to have fought at the battle of Vinegar Hill in 1798. At the peace of Amiens the troop was disbanded, and Wardle retired with the rank of lieutenant-colonel.

== National politics ==
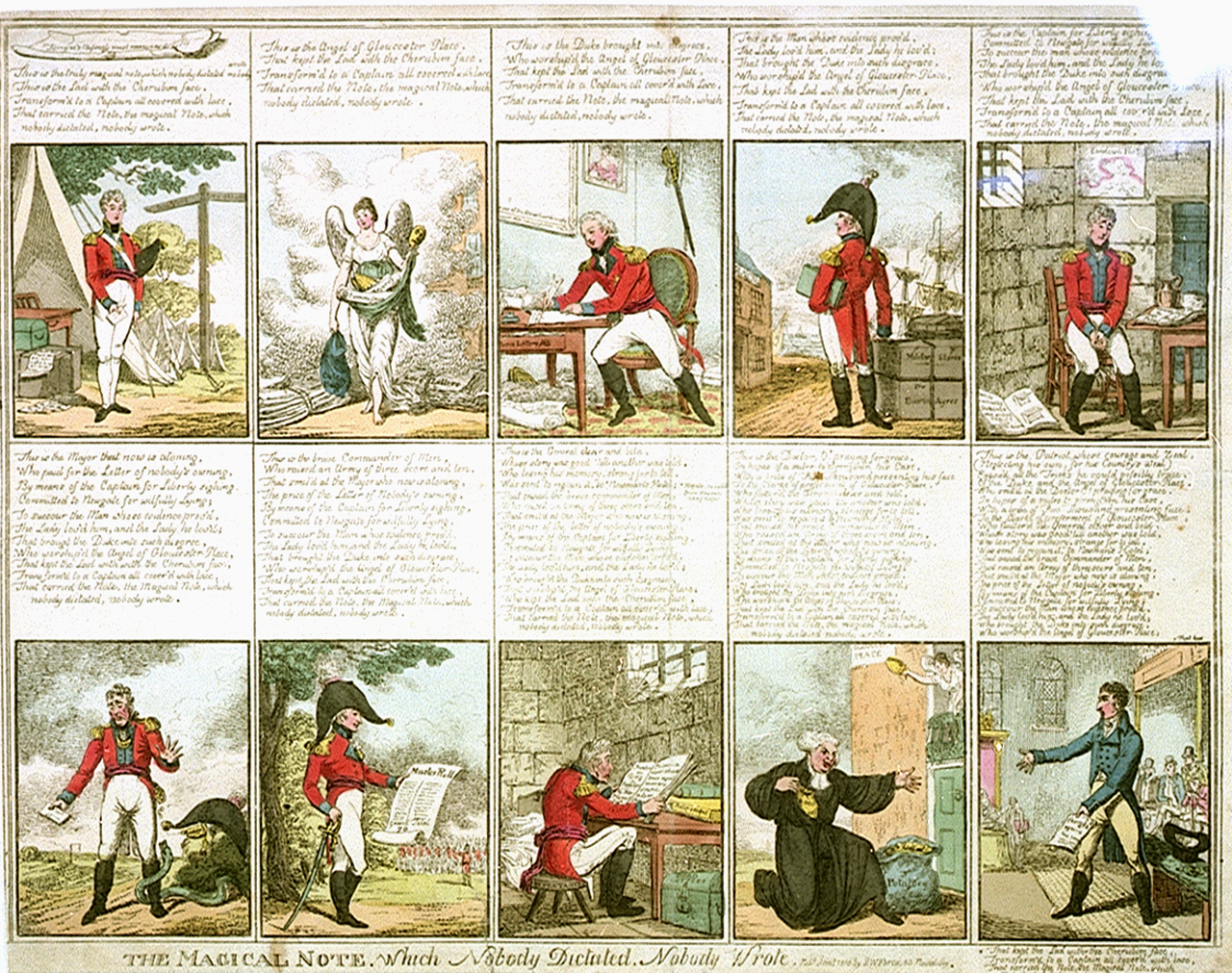
The Magical Note. Which Nobody Dictated, Nobody Wrote (caricature), January 1810

Wardle moved to Green Park Place, Bath, Somerset, in about 1800, where he was living when elected Member of Parliament for Okehampton in Devon in 1807. He won the election with 113 votes, and he is said to have been returned without the support of the borough's patron. According to a pamphlet by William Farquharson, he also had interests in a gin distillery in Jersey.

As a result of the scandals arising from the relationship of Prince Frederick, Duke of York and Albany, the commander-in-chief of the army, with Mary Anne Clarke, Wardle brought forward a motion against the Duke on 27 January 1809. Acting with Sir Francis Burdett, Wardle was able, through parliamentary privilege, to fight against the government's libel action against the press, which aimed to prevent corruption rumours against the Duke from becoming public. The House of Commons went into committee on the subject on 1 February, and the proceedings lasted until 20 March. Though he failed in convicting the Duke of personal corruption, sufficient indiscretions were proved to force his retirement. Due to public interest in the case, Wardle briefly became more prominent than Burdett, who was otherwise a more substantial radical campaigner.

Up to this point Wardle had been thought a bon viveur rather than a politician, but he remained committed to his cause. He made a long speech in parliament on 19 June 1809 on the public economy, and his resolutions on this were agreed. He was presented with the freedom of the city of London on 6 April 1809 and congratulatory addresses were presented to him by many corporations throughout the United Kingdom. His likeness was reproduced in a number of forms.

On 3 July 1809, Wardle's fortunes changed for the worse, when an upholsterer called Francis Wright brought a court action against him over matters concerning the furnishing of Mary Anne Clarke's house. With the attorney-general prosecuting, the jury found against Wardle, and evidence came out that Clarke and Wardle had colluded against the Duke. Wardle denied this in an open letter, and on 11 December he brought an action against the Wrights and Clarke for conspiracy. He lost the case, along with his reputation, James Glenie, a witness for the crown in the first trial, was also heavily criticised by the judge Lord Ellenborough.

Wardle's radical supporters included Timothy Brown, Major John Cartwright, William Cobbett, William Frend, and Robert Waithman. He was not re-elected for Okehampton after the dissolution of parliament in 1812, despite strong backing.

== Later life and death ==
Wardle moved to a farm in Kent between Tunbridge and Rochester; Mary Anne Clarke wrote that he sold milk. Later, with money troubles, he emigrated. He died in Florence, Italy, on 30 November 1833, aged 71.

== Works ==
An address from Colonel Wardle to his countrymen, arguing for Catholic Emancipation, was circulated in 1828. It was dated Florence, 3 November 1827, and praised conditions of life in Catholic Tuscany.

== Family ==
In 1792 Wardle married Ellen Elizabeth Parry, sister of Sir Love Jones-Parry, 1st Baronet, and daughter of Love Jones-Parry of Madryn, Carnarvonshire, who brought him estates in that county. They had seven children. He was an unfaithful husband.

== Notes ==
Parliament of the United Kingdom
Preceded by Richard Bateman-Robson; Joseph Foster-Barham	Member of Parliament for Okehampton; 1807–1812; With: Albany Savile	Succeeded by The Lord Graves; Albany Savile
