= List of Stewards of the Chiltern Hundreds 1751–1849 =

== Up to 1799 ==
Before 1770 (William de Grey), between 1775 and 1780 (Edward Meux Worsley to Sir William Lynch), and between 1782 and 1787 (John Buller to Sir George Duckett) the date given is that of the writ to replace the member who accepted the Stewardship.

Date	Member	Constituency	Party	Reason for resignation
25 January 1751	John Pitt	Wareham	[?]	To contest Dorchester
12 May 1753	Henry Vane	Downton	[?]	To contest County Durham
17 January 1755	Marquess of Winchester	Lymington	[?]	To contest Hampshire
18 March 1755	Thomas Pitt	Old Sarum	[?]	[?]
26 June 1756	Edward Bacon	Newport (Cornwall)	[?]	[?]
25 February 1757	Horace Walpole	Castle Rising	[?]	To sit for King's Lynn
13 July 1757	William Pitt	Okehampton	[?]	[?]
28 January 1758	Henry Bilson-Legge	Orford	[?]	[?]
2 December 1758	Soame Jenyns	Dunwich	[?]	[?]
15 February 1759	Walter Waring	Bishop's Castle	[?]	[?]
25 January 1760	Henry Townshend	Eye	[?]	[?]
24 May 1762	John Parker	Bodmin	[?]	[?]
3 March 1763	Sir James Lowther	Westmorland	[?]	[?]
16 March 1763	Earl of Ancram	Richmond	[?]	[?]
27 April 1763	Norborne Berkeley	Gloucestershire	[?]	[?]
28 April 1763	The Viscount Ligonier	Bath	[?]	Created Baron Ligonier
5 January 1764	Robert Lowther	Westmorland	[?]	[?]
13 June 1765	Gilbert Elliot	Selkirkshire	[?]	To sit for Roxburghshire
16 June 1766	William Woodley	Great Bedwyn	[?]	Appointed Governor of the Leeward Islands
26 January 1767	Lord George Lennox	Chichester	[?]	[?]
21 March 1767	Chase Price	Leominster	[?]	[?]
17 December 1767	Richard Pennant	Petersfield	[?]	[?]
13 November 1768	James Brudenell	Great Bedwyn	[?]	[?]
28 November 1768	John Wrottesley	Newcastle-under-Lyme	[?]	[?]
22 March 1769	Sir George Macartney	Cockermouth	[?]	[?]
24 April 1769	Henry Luttrell	Bossiney	[?]	[?]
17 January 1770	Edmund Nugent	St Mawes	[?]	[?]
14 April 1770	The Viscount Allen	Eye	[?]	[?]
29 January 1770	William de Grey	Newport (Cornwall)	[?]	[?]
26 February 1770	Sir Edward Dering	New Romney	[?]	[?]
18 May 1770	Lord Stavordale	Midhurst	[?]	[?]
26 January 1771	Richard Croftes	Downton	[?]	[?]
4 March 1771	William Gordon	Rochester	[?]	[?]
8 May 1771	Lauchlin Macleane	Arundel	[?]	[?]
28 January 1772	Lord Archibald Hamilton	Lancaster	[?]	[?]
29 April 1772	Richard Worge	Stockbridge	[?]	[?]
13 July 1772	John Roberts	Harwich	[?]	[?]
25 March 1773	Alexander Mackay	Tain Burghs	[?]	[?]
23 July 1772	Charles Jenkinson	Appleby	[?]	[?]
5 May 1773	David Graeme	Perthshire	[?]	[?]
9 March 1774	William Cornwallis	Eye	[?]	[?]
19 December 1774	The Earl of Courtown	Great Bedwyn	[?]	[?]
21 December 1774	Sir Charles Whitworth	East Looe	[?]	[?]
6 February 1775	Edward Meux Worsley	Yarmouth (Isle of Wight)	[?]	[?]
5 June 1775	Thomas Graves	East Looe	[?]	[?]
7 June 1775	Charles Ogilvie	West Looe	[?]	[?]
8 November 1775	Charles James Fox	Malmesbury	[?]	[?]
23 November 1775	Edward Eliot	St Germans	[?]	[?]
4 December 1775	Sir John Barrington	Newtown	[?]	[?]
16 December 1775	John Luttrell	Stockbridge	[?]	[?]
28 November 1776	Charles Brett	Lostwithiel	[?]	[?]
4 March 1777	Charles Wilkinson	Aldborough	[?]	[?]
24 May 1777	Charles Finch	Castle Rising	[?]	[?]
4 July 1777	Whitshed Keene	Montgomery	[?]	[?]
10 December 1777	Miles Barne	Dunwich	[?]	[?]
2 January 1778	Philip Anstruther	Anstruther Burghs	[?]	[?]
6 March 1778	Abel Smith	Aldborough	[?]	[?]
5 June 1778	The Viscount Barrington	Plymouth	[?]	[?]
10 June 1778	John Tucker	St Ives	[?]	[?]
4 December 1778	Sir Harry Burrard	Lymington	[?]	[?]
26 December 1778	Adam Drummond	St Ives	[?]	[?]
27 February 1779	Sir Hugh Palliser	Scarborough	[?]	[?]
8 April 1779	The Lord Milford	Plympton Erle	[?]	[?]
15 April 1779	James Pringle	Berwickshire	[?]	[?]
15 June 1779	Lord Hyde	Christchurch	[?]	[?]
31 March 1780	Sir William Lynch	Weobley	[?]	[?]
16 June 1780	Henry Strachey	Saltash	[?]	[?]
28 November 1780	Daniel Lascelles	Northallerton	[?]	[?]
13 February 1781	Paul Methuen	Great Bedwyn	[?]	[?]
4 April 1781	Edward Rushworth	Yarmouth (Isle of Wight)	[?]	[?]
20 March 1782	John Buller	West Looe	[?]	[?]
6 April 1782	Charles FitzRoy-Scudamore	Thetford	[?]	[?]
26 April 1782	Viscount Althorp	Northampton	[?]	[?]
21 December 1782	John Mayor	Abingdon	[?]	[?]
21 January 1783	Sir John Anstruther	Anstruther Burghs	[?]	[?]
31 January 1783	Thomas Bowlby	Launceston	[?]	[?]
13 February 1783	The Viscount Galway	Pontefract	[?]	[?]
11 March 1783	Francis Fownes-Luttrell	Minehead	[?]	[?]
3 May 1783	John Irwin	East Grinstead	[?]	[?]
21 August 1783	John Shaw-Stewart	Renfrewshire	[?]	[?]
1 December 1783	William Graves	East Looe	[?]	[?]
24 May 1784	William Graves	East Looe	[?]	[?]
14 June 1784	John Smith	New Romney	[?]	[?]
19 June 1784	The Earl Nugent	St Mawes	[?]	[?]
5 July 1784	Jonathan Phillips	Camelford	[?]	[?]
10 August 1784	Sir Thomas Gascoigne	Malton	[?]	[?]
16 August 1784	Paul Treby Ourry	Plympton Erle	[?]	[?]
21 August 1784	John Lemon	West Looe	[?]	[?]
11 April 1785	Robert Philipps	Hereford	[?]	[?]
9 August 1785	Sir John Honywood	Steyning	[?]	[?]
9 August 1785	John Simpson	Wenlock	[?]	[?]
6 February 1786	The Lord Milford	Haverfordwest	[?]	[?]
7 February 1786	Charles Dundas	Richmond	[?]	[?]
3 March 1786	Henry Arthur Herbert	East Grinstead	[?]	[?]
27 March 1786	Gabriel Steward	Weymouth and Melcombe Regis	[?]	[?]
10 April 1786	Hugh Seymour-Conway	Newport (Isle of Wight)	[?]	[?]
14 April 1786	John Pringle	Selkirkshire	[?]	[?]
13 June 1786	Thomas Postlethwaite	Haslemere	[?]	[?]
15 July 1786	Charles Lefebure	Wareham	[?]	[?]
19 October 1786	William McDowall	Renfrewshire	[?]	[?]
6 November 1786	John Lowther	Cockermouth	[?]	[?]
27 December 1786	George Jackson	Weymouth and Melcombe Regis	[?]	[?]
23 January 1787	John Townson	Milborne Port	[?]	[?]
24 January 1787	George FitzRoy	Bury St Edmunds	[?]	To provide a seat for Lord Charles FitzRoy
2 February 1787	Thomas Samuel Jolliffe	Petersfield	[?]	[?]
16 February 1787	John Lambton	City of Durham	[?]	Retired in favour of his son
19 February 1787	George Johnstone	Ilchester	[?]	[?]
21 February 1787	Maurice Lloyd	Gatton	[?]	[?]
5 March 1787	Sir Robert Palk	Ashburton	[?]	Retired in favour of his son
4 April 1787	Edward Morant	Yarmouth (Isle of Wight)	[?]	[?]
4 May 1787	Lancelot Brown	Huntingdon	[?]	To provide a seat for John Willett Payne
30 May 1787	Lord Frederick Campbell	Argyllshire	[?]	[?]
28 May 1787	William Wemyss	Sutherland	[?]	To contest Fife
8 June 1787	Sir Charles Gould	Brecon	[?]	To contest Breconshire
8 June 1787	John Nicholls	Bletchingley	[?]	[?]
31 January 1788	Philip Goldsworthy	Wilton	[?]	To provide a seat for Lord Herbert
17 March 1788	Sir John Stepney	Monmouth	[?]	To provide a seat for Lord Worcester
14 April 1788	Richard Grosvenor	East Looe	[?]	To provide a seat for Lord Belgrave
18 April 1788	Richard Myddelton	Denbigh Boroughs	[?]	Retired in favour of his son
16 May 1788	Lord Adam Gordon	Kincardineshire	[?]	[?]
22 May 1788	John Mortlock	Cambridge	[?]	[?]
25 June 1788	Harry Burrard	Lymington	[?]	[?]
4 July 1788	Gerard Noel Edwards	Maidstone	[?]	[?]
20 November 1788	Sir James Tylney-Long	Devizes	[?]	[?]
5 January 1789	Sir James Duff	Banffshire	[?]	[?]
11 February 1789	Robert Cuninghame	East Grinstead	[?]	[?]
22 July 1789	Sir James Campbell	Stirling Burghs	[?]	[?]
10 August 1789	Viscount Belgrave	East Looe	[?]	[?]
14 December 1790	James Grenville	Buckingham	[?]	[?]
16 December 1790	William Pierce Ashe à Court	Heytesbury	[?]	[?]
16 December 1790	Lord North	Petersfield	[?]	[?]
22 December 1790	Edward Rushworth	Yarmouth (Isle of Wight)	[?]	[?]
17 February 1791	Barne Barne	Dunwich	[?]	[?]
3 March 1791	Benjamin Lester	Poole	[?]	[?]
13 April 1791	Marquess of Titchfield	Petersfield	[?]	[?]
7 June 1791	William Coles Medlycott	Milborne Port	[?]	[?]
9 June 1791	Thomas Jones	Weymouth and Melcombe Regis	[?]	[?]
10 June 1791	Richard Penn	Haslemere	[?]	[?]
13 February 1792	Paul Benfield	Malmesbury	[?]	[?]
17 February 1792	Penn Assheton Curzon	Clitheroe	[?]	[?]
10 February 1793	Sir John Anstruther	Anstruther Burghs	[?]	[?]
17 June 1793	Sir Richard Worsley	Newtown	[?]	[?]
21 June 1793	The Earl of Courtown	Marlborough	[?]	[?]
23 January 1794	Sir John Jervis	Wycombe	[?]	[?]
24 January 1794	The Earl of Carhampton	Plympton Erle	[?]	[?]
3 February 1794	Richard Johnson	Milborne Port	[?]	[?]
6 March 1794	Nathaniel William Wraxall	Wallingford	[?]	[?]
27 March 1794	William Adam	Ross-shire	[?]	[?]
29 April 1794	Sir Richard Pepper Arden	Hastings	[?]	[?]
13 May 1794	Charles Stuart	Ayr Burghs	[?]	[?]
23 May 1794	Lancelot Brown	Huntingdonshire	[?]	[?]
29 May 1794	Robert Anstruther	Anstruther Burghs	[?]	[?]
24 June 1794	Edmund Burke	Malton	[?]	[?]
26 December 1794	William Beckford	Hindon	[?]	[?]
26 December 1794	Ewan Law	Westbury	[?]	[?]
1 January 1795	Francis Gregg	Morpeth	[?]	[?]
6 January 1795	Charles William Wyndham	Midhurst	[?]	[?]
6 February 1795	Henry Howard	Arundel	[?]	[?]
12 March 1795	William Wellesley-Pole	East Looe	[?]	[?]
30 October 1795	Peter Bathurst	Eye	[?]	[?]
2 March 1796	George Murray	Perth Burghs	[?]	[?]
23 November 1796	Lord John Thynne	Weobley	[?]	[?]
27 December 1796	Lord George Cavendish	Derby	[?]	[?]
29 December 1796	Hylton Jolliffe	Petersfield	[?]	[?]
13 March 1797	Edward Rushworth	Yarmouth	[?]	[?]
18 April 1797	William Cunninghame Bontine	Dunbartonshire	[?]	[?]
16 June 1797	James Grenville	Buckinghamshire	[?]	[?]
4 July 1797	Thomas Powys	Northamptonshire	[?]	[?]
19 July 1797	Viscount Castlereagh	Orford	[?]	[?]
20 July 1797	The Earl of Mornington	Old Sarum	[?]	[?]
9 November 1797	James Bruce	Marlborough	[?]	[?]
19 December 1797	Charles Brandling	Newcastle-upon-Tyne	[?]	[?]
8 February 1798	Sir Ralph Abercromby	Clackmannanshire	[?]	[?]
16 April 1798	William Graves	East Looe	[?]	[?]
23 June 1798	William Baldwin	Malton	[?]	[?]
21 November 1798	Charles George Beauclerk	Richmond	[?]	[?]
22 February 1799	Lord Granville Leveson-Gower	Lichfield	[?]	[?]
8 March 1799	Charles Williams-Wynn	Old Sarum	[?]	[?]
21 March 1799	Richard Richards	Helston	[?]	[?]
3 April 1799	Joseph Foster Barham	Stockbridge	[?]	[?]
10 April 1799	John Heathcote	Gatton	[?]	[?]
16 April 1799	Sir Christopher Hawkins	Mitchell	[?]	[?]
4 May 1799	John Buller	East Looe	[?]	[?]
7 June 1799	William Mitchell	Plympton Erle	[?]	[?]
11 July 1799	Lord Frederick Campbell	Argyllshire	[?]	[?]
12 July 1799	John Smith	East Looe	[?]	[?]
12 October 1799	John Lloyd	Flintshire	[?]	[?]

== 1800 to 1849 ==
Date	Member	Constituency	Party	Reason for resignation
25 February 1800	Sir Henry Vane-Tempest	City of Durham	[?]	[?]
7 March 1800	Michael Angelo Taylor	Aldeburgh	[?]	[?]
20 March 1800	Inigo Freeman Thomas	Weobley	[?]	[?]
14 April 1800	George William Richard Harcourt	Westbury	[?]	[?]
24 April 1800	William Hamilton Nisbet	Newport (Isle of Wight)	[?]	[?]
22 April 1800	Sir Hew Dalrymple-Hamilton	Haddingtonshire	[?]	[?]
23 April 1800	John Hope	Linlithgowshire	[?]	[?]
17 May 1800	William Stewart Rose	Christchurch	[?]	[?]
17 June 1800	The Earl of Lucan	St Albans	[?]	[?]
14 December 1800	The Earl of Inchiquin	Liskeard	[?]	[?]
14 February 1801	Sir George Yonge	Old Sarum	[?]	[?]
25 February 1801	John Bond	Corfe Castle	[?]	To provide a seat for his brother
25 February 1801	Henry Addington	Devizes	[?]	To resign the Speakership when invited by the King to form a government
25 February 1801	Sir Richard Worsley	Newtown	[?]	[?]
4 March 1801	Robert Saunders-Dundas	Rye	[?]	[?]
23 March 1801	Francis Page	Oxford University	[?]	[?]
25 March 1801	Sir William Scott	Downton	[?]	[?]
12 May 1801	George Garland	Poole	[?]	[?]
6 July 1801	Lord George Seymour	Totnes	[?]	[?]
7 November 1801	Sir Thomas Frankland	Thirsk	[?]	[?]
10 March 1802	Robert Baird	Haddington Burghs	[?]	[?]
16 December 1802	Harry Burrard	Lymington	[?]	[?]
18 December 1802	Henry St John	Wootton Bassett	[?]	[?]
24 January 1803	Charles Hope	Dumfries Burghs	[?]	[?]
10 May 1803	John Inglett-Fortescue	Callington	[?]	[?]
18 June 1803	Hon. Edward Bouverie	Downton	[?]	[?]
29 July 1803	John Spalding	Wigtown	[?]	[?]
13 August 1803	Hon. John Ward	Downton	[?]	[?]
16 August 1803	Charles Bragge	Bristol	Tory	[?]
21 December 1803	Thomas Smith	West Looe	[?]	[?]
27 December 1803	John George Philipps	Carmarthen	[?]	[?]
26 December 1803	Alexander Cumming-Gordon	Inverness Burghs	[?]	[?]
27 February 1804	Henry Swann	Yarmouth (Isle of Wight)	Tory	[?]
21 March 1804	John Delgarno	Yarmouth (Isle of Wight)	[?]	[?]
27 April 1804	James Charles Stuart Strange	Okehampton	[?]	[?]
7 May 1804	Earl of Dalkeith	Ludgershall	Tory	[?]
12 June 1804	Lord Paget	Milborne Port	[?]	[?]
19 July 1804	Thomas Grenville	Buckingham	[?]	[?]
4 August 1804	Sir Edward Pellew	Barnstaple	[?]	[?]
23 January 1805	James Buller	West Looe	[?]	[?]
31 January 1805	Charles Drake Garrard	Amersham	Tory	[?]
21 February 1805	James Martin Lloyd	Steyning	[?]	[?]
25 March 1805	William Cavendish	Knaresborough	Whig	[?]
15 April 1805	Andrew McDouall	Wigtownshire	[?]	[?]
23 April 1805	Charles Dundas	Malton	Whig	[?]
10 May 1805	John Penn	Helston	[?]	[?]
5 June 1805	Charles Chapman	Newtown	[?]	[?]
26 June 1805	John Charles Villiers	Tain Burghs	[?]	[?]
26 July 1805	Charles Tottenham	New Ross	[?]	[?]
9 August 1805	William Stewart	Wigtown	[?]	[?]
17 February 1806	Lord Robert Spencer	Tavistock	[?]	[?]
22 February 1806	James Colquhoun	Dunbartonshire	[?]	[?]
14 March 1806	Sir John Newport	Waterford City	[?]	[?]
15 March 1806	Thomas Tyrwhitt	Portarlington	[?]	[?]
18 March 1806	Thomas Fane	Lyme Regis	[?]	[?]
1 April 1806	Thomas Davis Lamb	Rye	Tory	[?]
17 April 1806	John Dalrymple	Haddington Burghs	[?]	[?]
21 April 1806	Davies Giddy	Helston	[?]	[?]
29 April 1806	Samuel Campbell Rowley	Kinsale	[?]	[?]
31 July 1806	John King	Enniskillen	[?]	[?]
1 August 1806	John Sargent	Bodmin	[?]	[?]
12 January 1807	William Cornwallis	Eye	[?]	[?]
15 January 1807	Frederick William Trench	Mitchell	Tory	[?]
21 January 1807	Josias Porcher	Bletchingley	[?]	[?]
27 January 1807	Sir William à Court	Heytesbury	[?]	[?]
17 February 1807	Henry Bromley	Worcester	[?]	[?]
26 February 1807	Edward Coke	Derby	[?]	[?]
31 March 1807	Lord Spencer Chichester	Carrickfergus	[?]	[?]
20 July 1807	Richard Richards	Helston	[?]	[?]
24 July 1807	Edward Leveson-Gower	Mitchell	[?]	[?]
27 July 1807	Sir Frederick Fletcher-Vane	Winchelsea	Whig	[?]
29 January 1808	Charles Bagot	Castle Rising	[?]	[?]
1 February 1808	George Galway Mills	Mitchell	[?]	[?]
23 February 1808	Dudley Long North	Newtown	Whig	[?]
24 February 1808	John Cheesment Severn	Wootton Bassett	Tory	[?]
29 February 1808	Henry Dawkins	Boroughbridge	Tory	[?]
20 April 1808	Sir Granby Calcraft	Wareham	[?]	[?]
26 April 1808	Benjamin Cooke Griffinhoofe	Yarmouth (Isle of Wight)	[?]	[?]
2 May 1808	William Dundas	Sutherland	Tory	[?]
7 May 1808	John Randoll Mackenzie	Tain Burghs	[?]	[?]
19 May 1808	Gerard Noel Noel	Rutland	[?]	[?]
13 June 1808	John Delgarno	Yarmouth (Isle of Wight)	[?]	[?]
25 June 1808	Stephen Lushington	Great Yarmouth	Whig	[?]
11 July 1808	John Osborn	Cockermouth	Tory	[?]
13 July 1808	Arthur Shakespeare	Richmond	Whig	[?]
15 July 1808	Sir William Elford	Rye	[?]	[?]
25 January 1809	Thomas Freeman-Heathcote	Bletchingley	[?]	[?]
20 February 1809	Albemarle Bertie	Stamford	[?]	[?]
21 February 1809	Charles Trelawny-Brereton	Mitchell	[?]	[?]
3 April 1809	William Meeke Farmer	Huntingdon	[?]	[?]
18 April 1809	Henry Wellesley	Eye	[?]	[?]
19 April 1809	John Pedley	Saltash	[?]	[?]
13 June 1809	Archibald Campbell	Clyde Burghs	[?]	[?]
26 June 1809	Walter Jones	Coleraine	Tory	[?]
30 January 1810	Thomas Grenville	Buckingham	[?]	[?]
31 January 1810	Lord Paget	Milborne Port	[?]	[?]
3 March 1810	Richard Nevill	Wexford	Tory	[?]
14 March 1810	Richard Ramsbottom	Windsor	Tory	[?]
24 March 1810	Francis Whittle	Westbury	[?]	[?]
16 April 1810	Thomas Carter	Callington	[?]	[?]
27 April 1810	Sir Joseph Sydney Yorke	St Germans	Tory	[?]
18 May 1810	George Cranfield Berkeley	Gloucestershire	Whig	[?]
13 July 1810	Archibald Colquhoun	Elgin Burghs	[?]	[?]
7 December 1810	Viscount Valentia	Yarmouth (Isle of Wight)	[?]	[?]
14 February 1811	Walter Palk	Ashburton	[?]	[?]
10 April 1811	The Viscount Palmerston	Newport (Isle of Wight)	Tory	[?]
19 April 1811	Joseph Hague Everett	Ludgershall	Tory	[?]
14 May 1811	Sir John Murray	Wootton Bassett	Tory	[?]
24 June 1811	Henry Bowyer	Abingdon	[?]	[?]
1 July 1811	Peter Parker	Wexford	Tory	[?]
26 February 1812	William Adam	Kincardineshire	[?]	[?]
9 March 1812	Richard Wellesley	East Grinstead	[?]	[?]
19 March 1812	Lord James Murray	Perthshire	[?]	[?]
13 March 1812	Sir Patrick Murray	Edinburgh	[?]	[?]
21 April 1812	Sir Abraham Hume	Hastings	[?]	[?]
8 May 1812	Richard Henry Alexander Bennet	Launceston	[?]	Lost the patronage of the Duke of Northumberland
8 June 1812	George Gunning	East Grinstead	[?]	[?]
1 July 1812	Sir William Oglander	Bodmin	[?]	[?]
7 July 1812	George Cochrane	Grampound	[?]	[?]
22 December 1812	Joseph Hague Everett	Ludgershall	Tory	[?]
26 December 1812	George Duckett	Plympton Erle	[?]	[?]
29 December 1812	John Courtenay	Appleby	[?]	[?]
12 February 1813	Sir John Duckworth	New Romney	Tory	[?]
13 February 1813	George Hobart	Mitchell	[?]	[?]
4 March 1813	Sir John Leman Rogers	Callington	[?]	[?]
11 March 1813	James Kibblewhite	Wootton Bassett	Whig	[?]
6 April 1813	John Attersoll	Wootton Bassett	Whig	[?]
27 April 1813	Charles Henry Bouverie	Downton	[?]	[?]
17 June 1813	Henry Arthur Herbert	Tralee	Whig	[?]
29 June 1813	Hugh Rose	Nairnshire	[?]	[?]
10 December 1813	Ralph John Lambton	City of Durham	Whig	[?]
20 December 1813	George Campbell	Carmarthen	[?]	[?]
11 April 1814	William à Court	Dorchester	[?]	[?]
11 April 1814	Lord William Bentinck	Nottinghamshire	Whig	[?]
16 April 1814	Peter Heron	Newton	[?]	[?]
9 May 1814	Charles Noel Noel	Rutland	[?]	[?]
10 June 1814	Lord George Beresford	Coleraine	Tory	[?]
2 August 1814	John Bruce	Mitchell	[?]	[?]
4 August 1814	John Kingston	Lymington	[?]	[?]
12 August 1814	Henry Dawkins	Aldborough	Tory	[?]
24 November 1814	Thomas Hussey	Aylesbury	[?]	[?]
5 December 1814	Benjamin Hall	Westbury	[?]	[?]
24 March 1815	Richard Boyle Bernard	Bandon	Tory	[?]
31 March 1815	William Frankland	Thirsk	Whig	[?]
14 April 1815	James Stephen	East Grinstead	[?]	[?]
4 May 1815	Henry Gally Knight	Aldborough	Tory	[?]
26 June 1815	Sandford Graham	Ludgershall	Whig	[?]
22 July 1815	Earl Gower	Newcastle-under-Lyme	[?]	[?]
31 July 1815	Lord Granville Leveson-Gower	Staffordshire	Whig	[?]
14 February 1816	John Leach	Seaford	[?]	[?]
23 February 1816	Joseph Jekyll	Calne	[?]	[?]
1 March 1816	Augustus John Foster	Cockermouth	Tory	[?]
4 March 1816	Sir Henry Conyngham Montgomery	Yarmouth (Isle of Wight)	[?]	[?]
6 March 1816	James Macdonald	Sutherland	[?]	[?]
13 March 1816	Thomas Read Kemp	Lewes	Whig	[?]
20 March 1816	Reginald Pole-Carew	Lostwithiel	[?]	[?]
21 March 1816	Charles Hope	Haddingtonshire	[?]	[?]
29 March 1816	Lord Burghersh	Lyme Regis	[?]	[?]
15 April 1816	David Vanderheyden	East Looe	Tory	[?]
15 April 1816	John Delgarno	Newport (Isle of Wight)	[?]	[?]
16 April 1816	George Ponsonby	Peterborough	Whig	[?]
9 May 1816	Edmund Pollexfen Bastard	Dartmouth	Tory	[?]
5 June 1816	Viscount Ebrington	Buckingham	Whig	[?]
15 June 1816	Sir William Congreve	Gatton	[?]	[?]
8 July 1816	Robert Rickards	Wootton Bassett	[?]	[?]
12 July 1816	William Douglas	Plympton Erle	[?]	[?]
2 August 1816	Sir William Stewart	Wigtownshire	[?]	[?]
6 February 1817	Edward Spencer Cowper	Hertford	Whig	[?]
8 February 1817	William Hicks-Beach	Malmesbury	Whig	[?]
14 February 1817	Viscount Cranborne	Weymouth and Melcombe Regis	Tory	[?]
18 February 1817	Richard Wellesley	Yarmouth (Isle of Wight)	[?]	[?]
21 February 1817	Augustus Cavendish-Bradshaw	Castle Rising	Tory	[?]
10 June 1817	Harvey Christian Combe	City of London	Whig	[?]
12 June 1817	The Earl of Desart	Bossiney	Tory	[?]
19 June 1817	Robert Peel	Chippenham	Whig	[?]
23 June 1817	Viscount Ebrington	Buckingham	Whig	[?]
28 June 1817	Charles Nicholas Pallmer	Ludgershall	Whig	[?]
12 July 1817	Lord John Russell	Tavistock	Whig	[?]
19 February 1818	Hart Davis	Colchester	Tory	[?]
18 March 1818	Alexander Maconochie	Yarmouth (Isle of Wight)	Tory	[?]
20 February 1819	The Lord Huntingfield	Dunwich	Tory	[?]
20 February 1819	Richard Sharp	Portarlington	Whig	[?]
27 February 1819	George Tennyson	Bletchingley	Whig	[?]
4 March 1819	Richard Pennefather	Cashel	Tory	[?]
6 March 1819	William Bagwell	Clonmel	Tory	[?]
16 March 1819	John Taylor	Yarmouth (Isle of Wight)	Tory	[?]
16 March 1819	William Mount	Yarmouth (Isle of Wight)	Tory	[?]
29 March 1819	Lord William Russell	Tavistock	Whig	[?]
30 March 1819	Marmaduke Lawson	Boroughbridge	Whig	[?]
5 April 1819	George Fludyer	Appleby	Tory	[?]
1 May 1819	Ralph Franco	Westbury	Tory	[?]
20 May 1819	John Bladen Taylor	Hythe	[?]	Ill health
29 May 1819	Edward Denny	Tralee	Tory	[?]
6 July 1819	William Fitzhugh	Tiverton	[?]	[?]
19 July 1819	Paul Methuen	Wiltshire	[?]	[?]
30 November 1819	William Lamb	Peterborough	Whig	[?]
3 December 1819	Edward Finch	Cambridge	Tory	[?]
22 May 1820	John Nicholas Fazakerley	Tavistock	Whig	[?]
30 May 1820	Viscount Normanby	Scarborough	Whig	[?]
4 June 1820	Arthur Howe Holdsworth	Dartmouth	[?]	[?]
16 June 1820	Albany Savile	Okehampton	Tory	[?]
27 June 1820	Kirkman Finlay	Malmesbury	[?]	[?]
17 July 1820	Arthur Johnston Crawford	Old Sarum	Tory	[?]
3 August 1820	Charles Ashe à Court	Heytesbury	[?]	[?]
7 November 1820	Sir Charles Mordaunt	Warwickshire	[?]	[?]
29 November 1820	Nathaniel Barton	Westbury	[?]	[?]
9 February 1821	Dudley Long North	Newtown	Whig	[?]
9 February 1821	John Carroll	New Ross	[?]	[?]
17 February 1821	Alexander Boswell	Plympton Erle	Tory	[?]
21 March 1821	James Henry Keith Stewart	Wigtown Burghs	Tory	[?]
28 April 1821	John Douglas	Orford	Tory	[?]
11 May 1821	Thomas Assheton Smith	Andover	Tory	[?]
26 May 1821	James Graham	St Ives	[?]	[?]
5 June 1821	George Finch	Lymington	[?]	[?]
21 July 1821	John Beckett	Cockermouth	[?]	[?]
11 February 1822	Sir John Nicholl	Great Bedwyn	Tory	[?]
18 February 1822	Augustus Clifford	Dungarvan	Whig	[?]
19 February 1822	Marquess of Titchfield	Bletchingley	Whig	[?]
14 March 1822	Lord John Campbell	Argyllshire	[?]	[?]
8 April 1822	Charles Milner Ricketts	Dartmouth	[?]	[?]
12 April 1822	Henry Fownes Luttrell	Minehead	Tory	[?]
30 April 1822	Abraham Moore	Shaftesbury	[?]	[?]
30 July 1822	Joseph Foster Barham	Stockbridge	Whig	[?]
14 August 1822	William Cust	Clitheroe	[?]	[?]
10 February 1823	Nicholas Vansittart	Harwich	[?]	[?]
10 February 1823	Charles Bathurst	Harwich	[?]	[?]
12 February 1823	James Scarlett	Peterborough	Whig	[?]
18 February 1823	George Bankes	Corfe Castle	Tory	[?]
18 February 1823	James Henry Leigh	Winchester	[?]	[?]
24 February 1823	Sir Compton Domvile	Bossiney	[?]	[?]
28 February 1823	James Somers Cocks	Reigate	[?]	[?]
4 March 1823	John Dodson	Rye	[?]	[?]
3 April 1823	Sir Harry Burrard-Neale	Lymington	[?]	[?]
16 February 1824	Lord Frederick Cavendish-Bentinck	Weobley	[?]	[?]
5 March 1824	Francis Leigh	New Ross	Tory	[?]
2 June 1824	The Lord Dunalley	Okehampton	Whig	[?]
13 July 1824	Robert Bruce	Clackmannanshire	[?]	[?]
11 February 1825	Thomas Claughton	Newton	[?]	[?]
8 March 1825	William Wilberforce	Bramber	Tory	[?]
2 April 1825	Philip Musgrave	Petersfield	[?]	[?]
6 April 1825	Lord Lindsay	Wigan	Tory	[?]
13 February 1826	Henry Bankes	Corfe Castle	Tory	[?]
22 February 1826	Richard Heber	Oxford University	Tory	[?]
1 March 1826	Thomas Grimston Estcourt	Devizes	[?]	[?]
3 March 1826	George Watson-Taylor	East Looe	Tory	[?]
15 December 1826	Sir William Curtis	Hastings	[?]	[?]
16 December 1826	George James Robarts	Wallingford	Whig	[?]
16 December 1826	George Edgcumbe	Plympton Erle	Tory	[?]
14 February 1827	Henry Fox	Horsham	Whig	[?]
16 February 1827	William Wilson Carus Wilson	Cockermouth	Tory	[?]
14 May 1827	William Russell	Bletchingley	Whig	[?]
16 May 1827	Sir Nicholas Conyngham Tindal	Harwich	Tory	[?]
22 May 1827	John Wilson Croker	Aldeburgh	Tory	[?]
23 May 1827	William Henry Fremantle	Buckingham	[?]	[?]
7 June 1827	Charles Arbuthnot	St Germans	Tory	[?]
9 July 1827	Guy Lenox Prendergast	Lymington	[?]	[?]
4 February 1828	Lord William Bentinck	King's Lynn	Whig	[?]
8 February 1828	John Bond	Corfe Castle	Tory	[?]
8 February 1828	Samuel Barrett Moulton Barrett	Richmond (Yorks)	Whig	[?]
11 February 1828	Richard Magenis	Enniskillen	Tory	[?]
29 February 1828	Sir Christopher Hawkins	St Ives	Tory	[?]
2 April 1828	Josias Alexander	Old Sarum	Tory	[?]
9 April 1828	John Wilks	Sudbury	[?]	[?]
23 April 1828	Thomas Frankland Lewis	Ennis	Tory	[?]
12 June 1828	Sir George Cockburn	Weobley	Tory	[?]
23 July 1828	William Lamb	Bletchingley	Whig	[?]
18 February 1829	Sir James Graham	Carlisle	Whig	[?]
27 February 1829	Wyndham Lewis	Aldeburgh	Tory	[?]
28 February 1829	Robert Peel	Oxford University	Tory	[?]
2 March 1829	Sir Manasseh Masseh Lopes	Westbury	Tory	[?]
6 March 1829	Lord FitzRoy Somerset	Truro	Tory	[?]
6 March 1829	Nathaniel William Peach	Corfe Castle	Tory	[?]
6 March 1829	Sir William Henry Clinton	Newark	[?]	[?]
13 March 1829	Earl Bruce	Marlborough	Whig	[?]
17 March 1829	Pownoll Pellew	Launceston	Tory	[?]
13 March 1829	Lord Brudenell	Marlborough	Tory	[?]
30 March 1829	Sir Edward Rich Owen	Sandwich	[?]	[?]
20 April 1829	Sir George Smyth	Colchester	Tory	In protest against the Roman Catholic Relief Act 1829.
4 May 1829	Robert Hurst	Horsham	Whig	[?]
9 May 1829	James Drummond Buller-Elphinstone	East Looe	Tory	[?]
25 May 1829	Joshua Walker	Aldeburgh	Tory	[?]
3 June 1829	Henry Evans	Wexford	Tory	[?]
9 June 1829	Sir Edward Denny	Tralee	Tory	[?]
2 July 1829	George Bankes	Corfe Castle	Tory	[?]
22 July 1829	Granville Proby	County Wicklow	Whig	[?]
12 February 1830	Charles Buller	West Looe	Whig	[?]
15 February 1830	Henry Brougham	Winchelsea	Whig	[?]
20 February 1830	Robert Henley Eden	Fowey	Tory	[?]
20 February 1830	James Hewitt Massy Dawson	Clonmel	Tory	To contest County Limerick
1 March 1830	Henry Bonham	Rye	[?]	[?]
2 March 1830	Henry Villiers-Stuart	County Waterford	Tory	[?]
8 March 1830	William Scott	Gatton	[?]	[?]
24 November 1830	Viscount Milton	Peterborough	Whig	[?]
17 December 1830	Sir Henry Hardinge	St Germans	Tory	[?]
20 December 1830	William Vesey-FitzGerald	Lostwithiel	Tory	[?]
23 December 1830	Viscount Valletort	Plympton Erle	Tory	[?]
28 December 1830	Thomas Knox	Dungannon	Tory	[?]
10 February 1831	Sir Hussey Vivian	Windsor	Whig	[?]
16 February 1831	Charles Stuart-Wortley-Mackenzie	Bossiney	Tory	[?]
18 February 1831	Robert William Mills	Bletchingley	Whig	[?]
21 February 1831	Henry Willoughby	Newark	[?]	[?]
26 February 1831	John Gregson	Saltash	[?]	[?]
1 March 1831	James Alexander Hodson	Wigan	Tory	[?]
4 March 1831	Sir James Montgomery	Peeblesshire	[?]	[?]
14 March 1831	William Sturges Bourne	Milborne Port	Tory	[?]
14 March 1831	Sir Philip Sidney	Eye	Tory	[?]
19 March 1831	Arthur Hill-Trevor	New Romney	Tory	[?]
6 April 1831	Sir James Scarlett	Malton	Whig	Left the Whigs for the Tories in opposition to electoral reform
9 April 1831	Sir Willoughby Gordon	Launceston	Tory	[?]
19 April 1831	William Stratford Dugdale	Shaftesbury	[?]	[?]
14 July 1831	William Henry Trant	Okehampton	Tory	[?]
15 July 1831	Henry Hanmer	Westbury	Whig	[?]
18 July 1831	John Ponsonby	Bletchingley	Whig	[?]
20 July 1831	James Brougham	Downton	Whig	[?]
22 July 1831	Viscount Bernard	Bandon	Tory	[?]
15 August 1831	Charles Tottenham	New Ross	Tory	[?]
25 August 1831	Viscount Ingestre	Armagh City	Tory	To contest Dublin City
30 September 1831	William Cavendish	Malton	Whig	[?]
6 October 1831	Charles Christopher Pepys	Higham Ferrers	Whig	[?]
11 October 1831	Lord Ashley	Dorchester	Tory	[?]
25 October 1831	Lord Russell	Tavistock	Whig	[?]
1 November 1831	Lord Francis Osborne	Cambridgeshire	[?]	[?]
15 December 1831	Charles Philip Yorke	Reigate	Tory	[?]
22 December 1831	Thomas Brayen	Leominster	[?]	[?]
2 February 1832	Earl of Brecknock	Dunwich	Tory	[?]
25 February 1832	Henry Glynne	Flint	Whig	[?]
26 June 1832	Sir Thomas Baring	Wycombe	[?]	[?]
8 March 1833	Viscount Milton	Malton	Whig	To contest Northamptonshire
20 March 1833	Edward Berkeley Portman	Marylebone	Whig	[?]
4 April 1833	George Barrington	Sunderland	[?]	[?]
11 May 1833	Sir John Hobhouse	Westminster	Whig	[?]
27 May 1833	David Ricardo	Stroud	Whig	[?]
12 August 1833	Sir John Key	City of London	Whig	[?]
4 September 1833	Charles Stuart	Buteshire	[?]	[?]
17 February 1834	James Cornish	Totnes	[?]	[?]
17 February 1834	Montague Gore	Devizes	Whig	Broke from the Whigs with the Derby Dilly over reform
21 March 1834	Sir Robert Frankland	Thirsk	Whig	[?]
24 March 1834	Sir John Maxwell	Paisley	[?]	[?]
27 June 1834	Mervyn Archdall	County Fermanagh	Tory	[?]
6 May 1835	Viscount Morpeth	West Riding of Yorkshire	Lib	Appointed Chief Secretary for Ireland
19 May 1835	Charles Richard Fox	Stroud	Lib	[?]
1 June 1835	James Kennedy	Tiverton	[?]	[?]
5 July 1835	Richard Alexander Oswald	Ayrshire	[?]	[?]
10 February 1836	Sir Philip Durham	Devizes	[?]	[?]
15 February 1836	Fretcheville Dykes	Cockermouth	Whig	[?]
17 February 1836	Colin Dunlop	Glasgow	[?]	[?]
18 February 1836	Thomas Frewen Turner	South Leicestershire	[?]	[?]
17 May 1836	Alexander Graham Speirs	Paisley	[?]	[?]
17 May 1836	Richard Sullivan	Kilkenny City	Lib	[?]
27 June 1836	Sir Robert Williames Vaughan	Merioneth	Con	[?]
23 August 1836	Sir Charles Greville	Warwick	Con	[?]
21 February 1837	Sir Francis Holyoake Goodricke	Stafford	Con	Resigned in May 1835 to contest Staffordshire; the House of Commons considered disenfranchising the borough for corruption and did not issue a new writ until 1837
23 February 1837	Sir Richard Williams-Bulkeley	Anglesey	Whig	[?]
21 April 1837	Thomas Read Kemp	Lewes	Lib	[?]
12 May 1837	Sir Francis Burdett	Westminster	Lib	To contest the seat against a Radical candidate
16 May 1837	John Temple Leader	Bridgwater	Lib	[?]
16 May 1837	Stewart Marjoribanks	Hythe	Whig	[?]
27 May 1836	James Oswald	Glasgow	[?]	[?]
25 July 1837	William Wilshere	Great Yarmouth	Whig	[?]
12 December 1837	Sir James John Hamilton	Sudbury	Con	[?]
12 December 1837	William Stephen Poyntz	Midhurst	Whig	[?]
20 February 1838	Henry Hanbury Tracy	Bridgnorth	[?]	[?]
20 February 1838	Hugh Owen Owen	Pembroke	Con	[?]
5 March 1838	Sir William Geary	West Kent	Con	[?]
1 May 1838	Thomas Chaplin	Stamford	Con	[?]
11 May 1838	Henry Peyton	Woodstock	Con	[?]
21 May 1838	Henry Thomas Hope	Gloucester	Con	[?]
9 June 1838	Viscount Northland	Dungannon	Con	[?]
12 June 1838	Alexander Chisholm	Inverness-shire	Con	[?]
14 June 1838	James Hope	Linlithgowshire	[?]	[?]
9 March 1839	Richard Potter	Wigan	Whig	[?]
24 June 1839	Lord William Bentinck	Glasgow	Whig	[?]
15 July 1839	Thomas Milner Gibson	Ipswich	Con	[?]
26 July 1839	Jasper Parrott	Totnes	[?]	[?]
19 August 1839	Arthur Kinnaird	Perth	[?]	[?]
6 September 1839	Thomas Spring Rice	Cambridge	Whig	[?]
24 January 1840	George Lane Fox	Beverley	Con	[?]
25 January 1840	Thomas Attwood	Birmingham	Lib	[?]
28 January 1840	Hon. William Noel	Rutland	Con	[?]
22 February 1840	Lord Leveson	Morpeth	Lib	[?]
4 March 1840	Roderick Macleod	Inverness Burghs	Whig	[?]
12 March 1840	Viscount Cantelupe	Helston	Con	[?]
8 April 1840	Hon. William Howard	Sutherland	Con	[?]
25 April 1840	Francis William Grant	Elginshire and Nairnshire	[?]	[?]
5 June 1840	Sir John Benn Walsh	Sudbury	Con	[?]
31 July 1840	Henry Chester	County Louth	[?]	[?]
12 August 1840	Somerset Maxwell	County Cavan	Con	[?]
24 August 1840	John Power	County Waterford	[?]	[?]
9 February 1841	Hon. Edward Grimston	Helston	Con	[?]
2 February 1841	Francis Finch	Walsall	Lib	[?]
9 February 1841	William Addams Williams	Monmouthshire	[?]	[?]
16 February 1841	Alexander Speirs	Richmond (Yorks)	Whig	[?]
24 February 1841	Nicholas Fitzsimon	King's County	[?]	[?]
4 September 1841	Edward Strutt	Derby	Whig	[?]
15 September 1841	Henry Warburton	Bridport	Radical	[?]
17 September 1841	William Thompson	Sunderland	[?]	[?]
5 October 1841	Henry William Hobhouse	Hereford	Whig	[?]
10 February 1842	Sir Stratford Canning	King's Lynn	Con	[?]
11 February 1842	Edward Thomas Bainbridge	Taunton	Whig	[?]
18 February 1842	George Abercromby	Clackmannanshire and Kinross-shire	[?]	[?]
16 April 1842	Patrick Chalmers	Montrose Burghs	[?]	[?]
5 May 1842	Isaac Newton Wigney	Brighton	Lib	[?]
26 May 1842	Sir Robert Bateson	Londonderry	Con	[?]
4 August 1842	Sir George Larpent	Nottingham	Whig	[?]
23 August 1842	John Willis Fleming	South Hampshire	Con	[?]
16 March 1843	John Rundle	Tavistock	Whig	[?]
18 March 1843	Thomas Pemberton	Ripon	Con	[?]
4 May 1843	William Bird Brodie	Salisbury	Whig	[?]
8 September 1843	Alexander Cameron Campbell	Argyllshire	[?]	[?]
10 February 1844	Thomas Sotheron	Devizes	Con	[?]
30 March 1844	Joseph Planta	Hastings	Con	[?]
11 May 1844	Thomas Duffield	Abingdon	Con	[?]
4 June 1844	Hon. Arthur Henry Cole	Enniskillen	Con	ill health
9 July 1844	Sir David Roche	Limerick City	Lib	[?]
2 August 1844	Thomas Chester-Master	Cirencester	Con	[?]
8 August 1844	Thomas Hawkes	Dudley	[?]	[?]
20 September 1844	Lord Stanley	North Lancashire	Con	In anticipation of a writ in acceleration to the House of Lords
3 March 1845	Sir Edward Knatchbull	East Kent	Con	[?]
26 April 1845	Charles Greenaway	Leominster	[?]	[?]
1 May 1845	Marquess of Blandford	Woodstock	Con	[?]
25 June 1845	William Ramsay Ramsay	Midlothian	[?]	[?]
20 August 1845	Sir James Tennent	Belfast	Con	[?]
30 January 1846	Sir Horace Beauchamp Seymour	Midhurst	Con	[?]
3 February 1846	George Darby	East Sussex	Con	[?]
5 February 1846	Joseph Stock	Cashel	Lib	[?]
11 February 1846	Sir Thomas Fremantle	Buckingham	Con	Disagreement with the Duke of Buckingham over the Corn Laws
14 February 1846	Hon. William Dawnay	Rutland	Con	[?]
19 February 1846	Lord Ashley	Dorset	Con	[?]
19 February 1846	Henry Sturt	Dorset	Con	[?]
19 February 1846	The Lord Henniker	East Suffolk	Con	[?]
24 February 1846	William Ralph Cartwright	South Northamptonshire	Con	[?]
27 February 1846	Hon. Francis Charteris	East Gloucestershire	Con	[?]
2 March 1846	Mark Blake	County Mayo	[?]	[?]
7 March 1846	Alexander Baillie-Cochrane	Bridport	Con	[?]
15 April 1846	John Walbanke-Childers	Malton	Whig	[?]
2 May 1846	William Baird	Falkirk Burghs	Con	[?]
10 July 1846	Henry Labouchere	Taunton	Whig	[?]
25 January 1847	Ambrose Hussey	Salisbury	Con	[?]
30 January 1847	Lord Robert Grosvenor	City of Chester	Whig	To contest Middlesex
2 February 1847	Charles Wyndham	West Sussex	Con	[?]
17 March 1847	Sir Howard Elphinstone	Lewes	Lib	[?]
15 December 1847	William Dougal Christie	Weymouth and Melcombe Regis	Whig	[?]
15 December 1847	Samuel Christy-Miller	Newcastle-under-Lyme	[?]	[?]
18 December 1847	William Yates Peel	Tamworth	Con	[?]
22 December 1847	David Barclay	Sunderland	[?]	[?]
19 February 1848	Frederick Shaw	Dublin University	Con	[?]
25 February 1848	William Heald Ludlow Bruges	Devizes	[?]	[?]
1 March 1848	Daniel O'Connell	Waterford City	[?]	[?]
27 April 1848	William Acton	County Wicklow	Con	[?]
13 February 1849	Lord Courtenay	South Devon	Con	[?]
6 April 1849	Sir William Heathcote	North Hampshire	Con	[?]
17 April 1849	Lancelot Rolleston	South Nottinghamshire	Con	[?]
3 May 1849	Henry George Ward	Sheffield	Lib	[?]
7 June 1849	Evelyn Shirley	South Warwickshire	Con	[?]
4 July 1849	Lionel de Rothschild	City of London	Lib	[?]
2 August 1849	Sir James Duke	Boston	Whig	To contest a by-election for the City of London
