= George Cary (priest) =

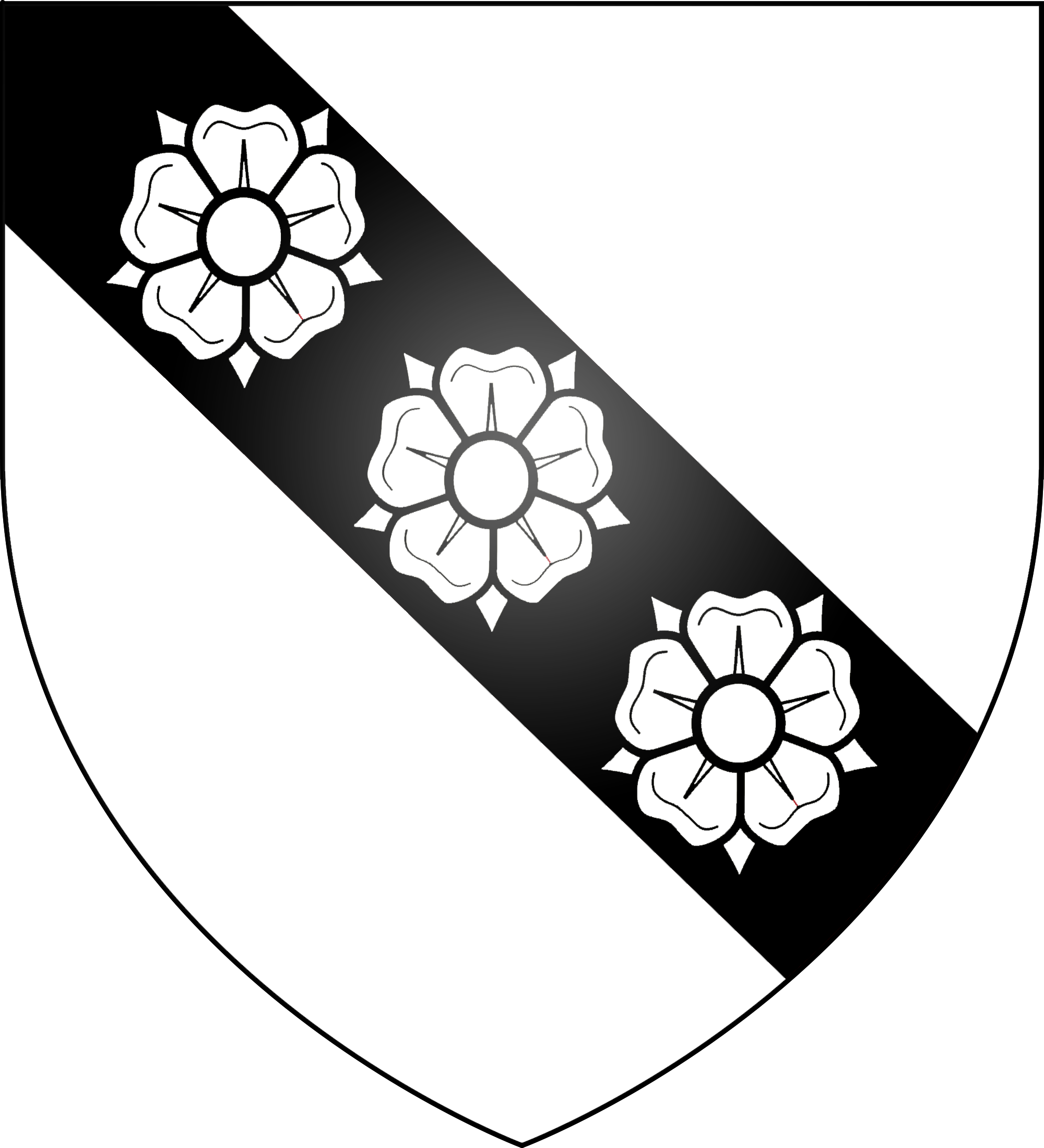
Arms of Cary: Argent, on a bend sable three roses of the field

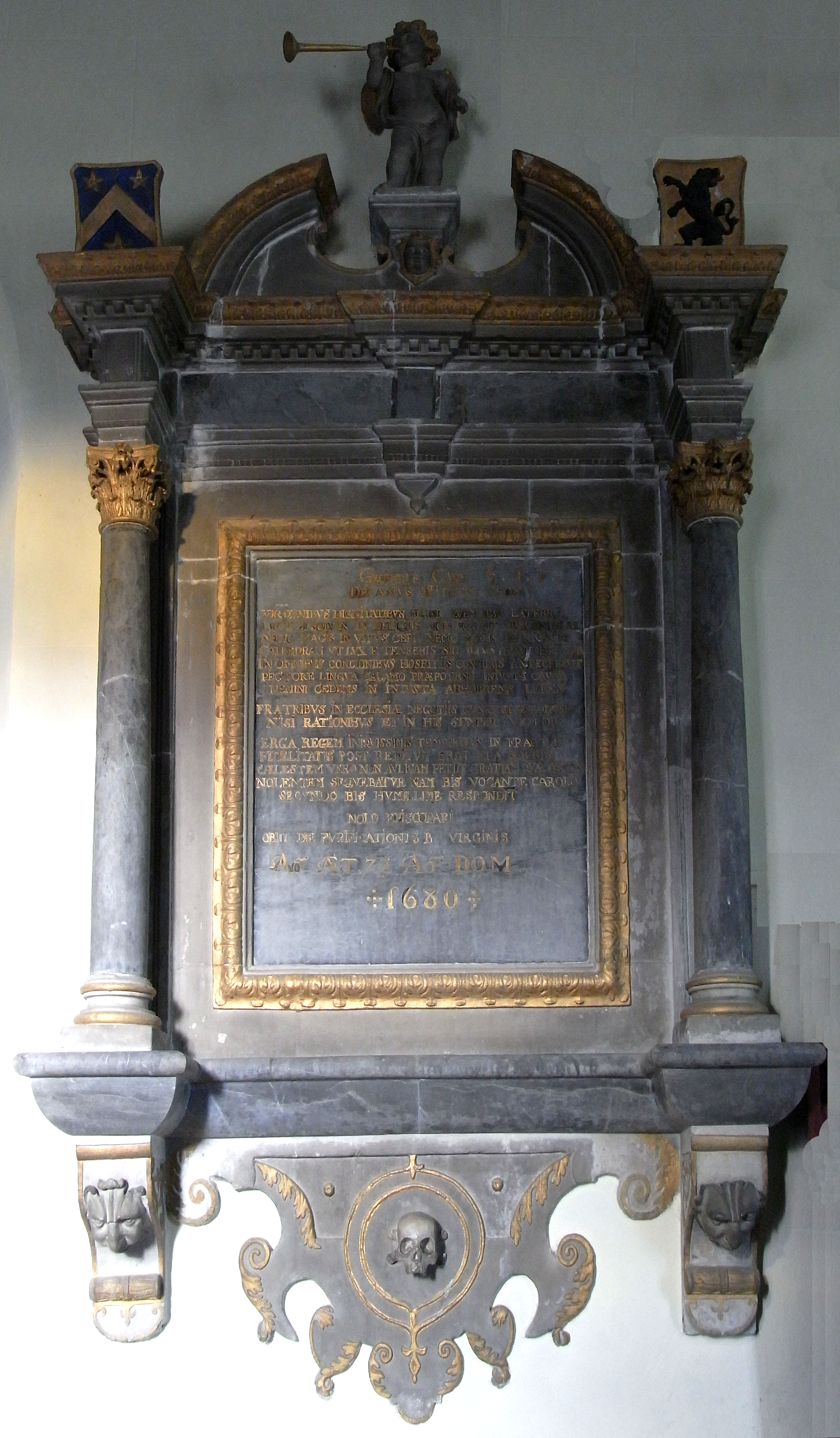
Mural monument to Dr. George Cary (1611–1680), Dean of Exeter, Clovelly Church

Doctor George Cary (1611–1680), Professor of Sacred Theology, lord of the manor of Clovelly, Devon, was Dean of Exeter between 1663 and 1680 (amongst other duties responsible for the maintenance and decoration of Exeter Cathedral). He was also Rector of Clovelly and of Shobrooke in Devon and Chaplain in Ordinary to King Charles II. He was one of the Worthies of Devon of John Prince (died 1723).

== Origins ==
He was the second son and eventual heir of William Cary (1576–1652), lord of the manor of Clovelly in Devon, Justice of the Peace for Devon and Member of Parliament for Mitchell, Cornwall, in 1604, by his second wife Dorothy Gorges (died 1622), eldest daughter of Sir Edward Gorges of Wraxall, Somerset by his wife Dorothy Speke. His mother's monument survives in the Speke Chantry in Exeter Cathedral.

== Career ==
He was educated at Exeter Grammar School and in 1628 entered The Queen's College, Oxford but later moved to Exeter College, Oxford, much frequented by Devonians. His first clerical appointment was by his father as Rector of Clovelly. Following the Restoration of the Monarchy in 1660, he was appointed Chaplain in Ordinary to King Charles II, after which he received the honour of a Doctorate in Divinity from Oxford University. At the bequest of the Lord Chamberlain he preached a Lent sermon before the king, for which was much thanked by the Archbishop of Canterbury. During most of his career he lived about 44 miles south-east of Clovelly, at Exeter, and at Shobrooke, near Crediton, 9 miles to the north-west of Exeter. Indeed it appears that until about 1702 Clovelly was occupied by his second cousins, the three brothers John Cary, George Cary (died 1702) and Anthony Cary (died 1694), sons of Robert Cary of Yeo Vale, Alwington, near Clovelly. He rebuilt the rectory house at Shobrooke, which he found in a dilapidated state and made it "a commodious and gentile dwelling". He also rebuilt the "ruinous,...filthy and loathsome" Dean's House in Exeter, which during the Civil War had been let to negligent tenants by the See of Exeter, and "in a short time so well repaired, so thoroughly cleansed and so richly furnished this house that it became a fit receptacle for princes". As the Emperor Augustus with the City of Rome, so did Dean Cary with the Dean's House in Exeter "found it ruines but he left it a palace", as Prince suggests. Indeed King Charles II stayed there on the night of 23 July 1670, having visited the newly built Citadel in Plymouth. It was also the chosen abode of Christopher Monck, 2nd Duke of Albemarle, Lord Lieutenant of Devon, for three weeks in 1675 and again during the Monmouth Rebellion. He was a liberal benefactor in assisting the Corporation of Exeter in the completion in 1699 of the cutting of a leat between Exeter Quay and Topsham, which fed into a pool which could shelter 100 ships.

He twice refused offers of the Bishopric of Exeter made by King Charles II, on vacancies arising in 1666 and 1676. The reason for his first refusal, or profession of Nolo Episcopari, is unknown, but he refused the second time due to age and infirmity which would prevent him attending Parliament as would be required.

In 1675 he succeeded to the paternal estates, including Clovelly, of his elder brother Sir Robert Cary (1610–1675), a Gentleman of the Privy Chamber to King Charles II who died unmarried and without children. He erected in his memory the surviving mural monument in Clovelly Church.

== Marriage and issue ==
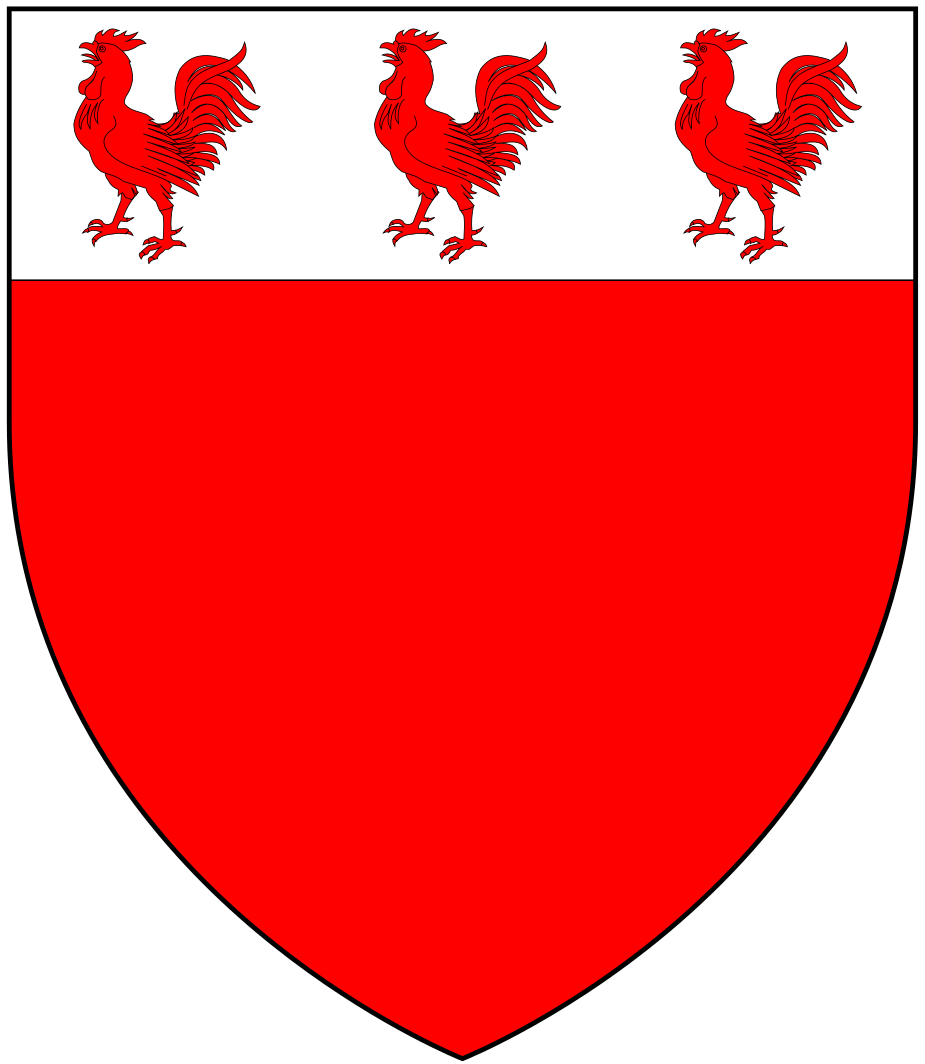
Canting arms of Hancock of Combe Martin: Gules, on a chief argent three cocks of the field

He married Anne Hancock, a daughter of William Hancock (died 1625), lord of the manor of Combe Martin, Devon, by whom he had numerous children including:

- Sir George Cary (1654–1685), eldest son and heir. He was knighted by King Charles II during his father's lifetime and served as a Member of Parliament for Okehampton in 1681 and occupied the honourable position of Recorder of Okehampton, Devon. His mural monument survives in Clovelly Church. He married twice, but left no children.
- William Cary (c. 1661 – 1710), 2nd son, twice a Member of Parliament for Okehampton in Devon 1685-1687 and 1689-1695 and also for Launceston in Cornwall 1695-1710. His mural monument survives in Clovelly Church.
- Judith Cary, wife of Rev. Richard Hele of Hele in the parish of Cornwood in Devon, Rector of Helland in Cornwall, and mother of Richard Hele (1679-1709) of Flete House, Holbeton, Devon, MP for West Looe in Cornwall.

== Death ==
He died at Shobrooke on 2 February 1680, but was buried in Clovelly Church, where his mural monument survives, erected by his eldest son Sir George Cary (1654–1685), the armorials of the latter's two wives appearing on the top of the monument as follows: dexter: Azure, a chevron between three mullets pierced or (Davie of Canonteign, Christow); sinister: Or, a lion reguardant sable langued gules (Jenkyn of Cornwall). The Latin inscription is as follows:

Georgius Cary S(acrae) T(heologiae) P(rofessor) Decanus B(eat)i Petri Exon(iensis), vir omnibus dignitatibus major quem ipsa latebra licet ei solum in deliciis non potuit abscondere. Nemo magis invitus cepit nemo magis adornavit cathedram ut lux e tenebris sic illustravit ecclesia^{m}. In omnibus concionibus, hospitiis, conciliis antecelluit. Pectore, lingua calamo, praepotens. In justa causa nemini cedens; in injusta abhorrens lites. Fratribus in ecclesiae negotiis nunquam sese opposuit nisi rationibus et in his semper victor. Erga regem iniquissimis temporibus infractae fidelitatis: post reditum erat ei a sacris. Caelestem vero non aulicam petiit gratiam, quae tamen nolentem sequebatur, nam bis vocante Carolo Secundo, bis humillime respondit: Nolo Episcopari. Obiit die Purificationis B(eatae) Virginis A(nn)o Aet(atis) (suae) 72, A(nn)o Dom(ini) 1680.

Which may be translated as:

"George Cary, Professor of Sacred Theology, Dean of the Blessed St Peter of Exeter, a man greater in all things worthy than concealment allowed to him, ((?)only in delights he was not able to conceal). No man more against his will took possession of, no man more beautified a cathedral; As light out of shadow, thus he lit up the Church. In all assemblies, guest-chambers and councils he distinguished himself. In his heart, tongue and pen, (he was) exceedingly mighty. In a just cause ceding to no man; in an unjust (cause) abhorring strife. In affairs of business he never opposed himself to his brothers in the Church, unless for (good) reasons, and in those always the victor. Thus in the most evil times he was of unbroken fidelity towards the king. Afterwards to him was given back ((?)by those things which are holy). Indeed he sought heavenly grace, not grace in the court of kings, which nevertheless against his wishes followed him, for at the two-fold call of Charles II twice he replied in the greatest humility: "I am unwilling to wear the Bishop's Mitre" (lit: "to be bishoped"). He died on the day of the Purification of the Blessed Virgin, in the year of his age 72,(sic) in the year of Our Lord 1680".

== Sources ==
- Vivian, Lt.Col. J.L., (Ed.) The Visitations of the County of Devon: Comprising the Heralds' Visitations of 1531, 1564 & 1620, Exeter, 1895, pp. 150–9, pedigree of Cary
- Prince, John, (1643–1723) The Worthies of Devon, 1810 edition, London, pp. 187–191, Cary, George, D.D.
- Lauder, Rosemary, Devon Families, Tiverton, 2002, pp. 131–6, Rous of Clovelly
- Griggs, William, A Guide to All Saints Church, Clovelly, first published 1980, Revised Version 2010

Church of England titles
Preceded by Edward Young	Dean of Exeter; 1662–1663	Succeeded by The Hon Richard Annesley
