= John Dibble =

English Whig politician (1634–c.1707)

John Dibble (died January 1728) was an English merchant and Whig politician.

== Biography ==
Dibble was the son of Daniel Dibble of Daniells, North Downs. He was a timber merchant and had significant business interests in Okehampton. For a time he had government contracts to supply timber to the Royal Navy, but he was beset frequently by cashflow problems. At the 1705 English general election, he was returned as a Member of Parliament for the Okehampton constituency, thanks in part to the large number of employees he had in the area. Soon after the 1705 election he became a justice of the peace for Devon. In the Commons, he was identified as a Whig and he voted in favour of the Foreign Protestants Naturalization Act 1708. By this stage, Dibble has incurred significant debts, including to Sir Nicholas Morice, 2nd Baronet, who stated: "Mr Dibble hath no habitation nor settlement in London, neither drives he any trade in the City. 'Tis difficult to find where he is and 'twill be extreme hard to squeeze any money from him. He owes much in this county and cannot appear but under the protection of privilege of Parliament". In 1710, Dibble voted for the impeachment of Henry Sacheverell. Dibble was returned for Okehampton at the 1710 British general election, when as many as 135 new voters were created on his behalf, mostly his "servants, waggoners and carters". He did not stand for election in 1713, likely as a result of the failure of his business and the need to hide from creditors.

Parliament of Great Britain
Preceded by Simon Leach; Thomas Northmore	Member of Parliament for Okehampton with Thomas Northmore (1705–1708); William Harris (1708–1709); Christopher Harris (1709–1713); 1705–1713	Succeeded by William Northmore; Christopher Harris
