= Robert Pitt =

British politician

Robert Pitt (1680 – 21 May 1727) was a British politician who sat in the House of Commons from 1705 to 1727. He was the father and grandfather of two prime ministers, William Pitt the elder and William Pitt the younger.

== Early life ==
Pitt was the eldest son of Governor Thomas 'Diamond' Pitt, a businessman who had made a fortune while in India. Governor Pitt built the family's wealth on his acquisition of the Pitt Diamond which he then sold on for a large profit. The diamond was brought into Britain in the heel of Robert Pitt's boot. In 1704, Pitt married Harriet Villiers, the daughter of Edward Villiers-FitzGerald and the Irish heiress Katherine FitzGerald.

== Political career ==
In 1705 Pitt was returned as Member of Parliament for Old Sarum, a pocket borough controlled by his family. He retained the seat at the 1708 general election, but in 1710 was not put forward by his father and was returned instead on his own account as MP for Salisbury. He came third in the poll at Salisbury at the 1713 general election but his father then put him up at Old Sarun again where he was returned. At the 1715 general election Pitt stood for Parliament at Old Sarum and Salisbury but was only returned for Old Sarum. At the 1722 general election he stood at Old Sarum and Okehampton, and chose to take the seat at Okehampton, where he remained until his death. Unlike the rest of his family, who were Whigs, Robert Pitt became a Tory possibly partly in resistance to his domineering Whig father.

== Death and family ==
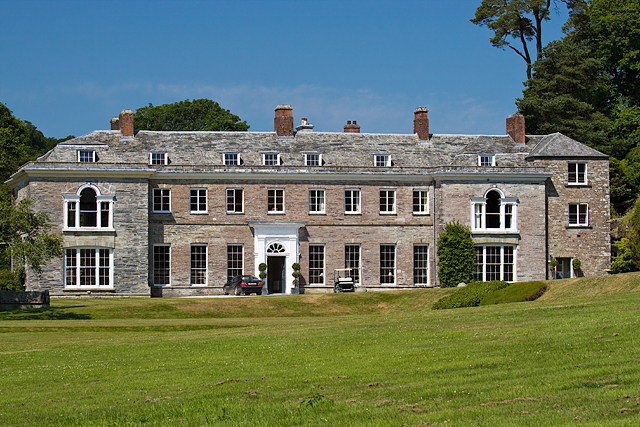
Boconnoc House, Cornwall

Pitt inherited the family estate of Boconnoc following his father's death in 1726. However, he died the next year. He left two sons and five daughters. His elder son Thomas Pitt was also an MP who sat for Okehampton and the Pitt estate passed entirely to him. His second son was William Pitt the Elder, a British statesmen who led the country three times in 1756–57, 1757–1762 and 1766–1768. His daughter Harriott married William Corbet. His other daughter Catherine married Robert Nedham. His grandson William Pitt the Younger became Prime Minister in 1783. Pitt was also brother-in-law to General James Stanhope, through his sister Lucy Pitt.

== Bibliography ==
- Black, Jeremy. Pitt the Elder. Cambridge University Press, 1992.
- Brown, Peter Douglas. William Pitt, Earl of Chatham: The Great Commoner. Allen & Unwin, 1978.

Parliament of England
Preceded by William Harvey; Charles Mompesson	Member of Parliament for Old Sarum; 1705–1707; With: Charles Mompesson	Succeeded by Parliament of Great Britain
Parliament of Great Britain
Preceded by Parliament of England	Member of Parliament for Old Sarum; 1707–1710; With: Charles Mompesson 1707–1708; William Harvey 1708–1710	Succeeded by Thomas Pitt; William Harvey
Preceded by Robert Eyre; Charles Fox	Member of Parliament for Salisbury; 1710–1713; With: Charles Fox	Succeeded by Charles Fox; Richard Jones
Preceded by Thomas Pitt; William Harvey	Member of Parliament for Old Sarum; 1713–1722; With: Thomas Pitt 1713–1716, 1722; Sir William Strickland 1716–1722	Succeeded by Thomas Pitt; George Morton Pitt
Preceded by Christopher Harris; William Northmore	Member of Parliament for Okehampton; 1722–1727; With: John Crowley	Succeeded by William Northmore; Thomas Pitt
