= Matthew St Quintin =

Matthew Chitty St Quintin (c. 1701–1783), of Harpham, Yorkshire. was a British politician who sat in the House of Commons from 1728 to 1734

St Quintin was the son of Hugh St Quintin, merchant of Amsterdam, and his wife Catherine Chitty, daughter of Matthew Chitty. He was educated at Greenwich and at Dr Newcome’s academy at Hackney and was admitted at Sidney Sussex College, Cambridge on 17 April 1718, aged 16. He was admitted at Middle Temple on 18 April 1718.

St Quintin stood unsuccessfully for the former seat of his uncle Sir William St Quintin, 3rd Baronet at Kingston upon Hull at the 1727 British general election. He was brought in as Member of Parliament for Old Sarum by Thomas Pitt at a by-election on 1 March 1728. In Parliament he voted for the Administration in all recorded divisions. He did not stand for Old Sarum again, and was defeated at St Mawes at the 1734 British general election.

St Quintin died unmarried on 8 May 1783.

Parliament of Great Britain
Preceded by Thomas Pitt of Boconnoc; The Earl of Londonderry	Member of Parliament for Old Sarum; 1728–1734; With: The Earl of Londonderry; Thomas Harrison 1728	Succeeded by Thomas Pitt of Boconnoc; Robert Nedham
