= George Cary (MP) =

English Tory politician (c.1653–1685)

Sir George Cary (c. 1653 – 6 January 1685) was an English Tory politician.

== Biography ==
Cary was the eldest son of Doctor George Cary, Dean of Exeter, and Mary Hancock, a daughter of William Hancock of Combe Martin, Devon. He was knighted by Charles II in 1679, shortly before inheriting his father's estates in 1680. In 1681, he was returned to the Oxford Parliament as a Member of Parliament for Okehampton. He was inactive in the parliament and died on 6 January 1685, aged 31. Between 1678 and his death, he was a justice of the peace for Devon. He was recorder of Okehampton between 1681 and his death, and was succeeded in the role by his younger brother, William Cary.

Parliament of England
Preceded by Sir Arthur Harris, Bt; Josias Calmady	Member of Parliament for Okehampton with Sir Arthur Harris, Bt; 1681	Succeeded by Simon Leach; William Cary
