= Hayne, Stowford =

Historic manor in Devon, England

Coordinates: 50°39′30″N 4°14′03″W

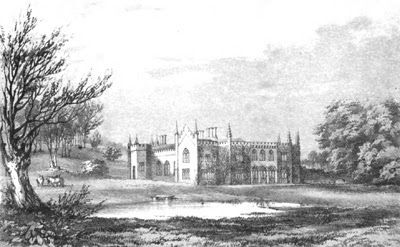
Hayne, 19th century engraving of the house rebuilt circa 1810 in the Gothic revival style by Isaac Donnithorne (died 1848) who later adopted the surname Harris

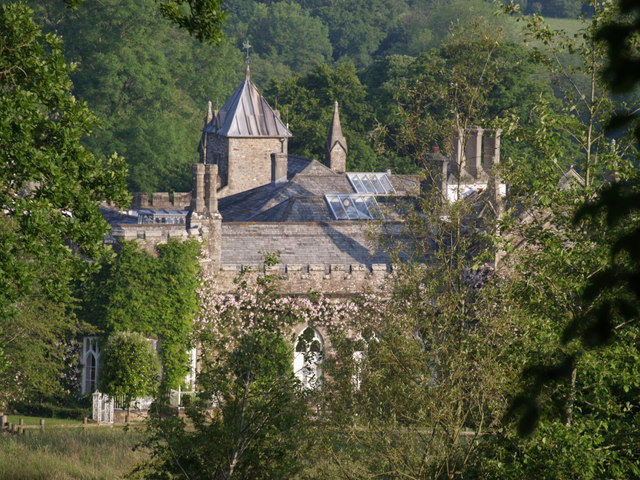
Hayne in 2007

Hayne in the parish of Stowford in Devon, is an historic manor, about 11 miles (18 km) south-west of Okehampton. The surviving manor house, a Grade II* listed building known as Hayne House, was rebuilt in about 1810 by Isaac Donnithorne (died 1848), who later adopted the surname Harris having married the heiress of Harris of Hayne.

== Descent ==
=== De Hayne ===
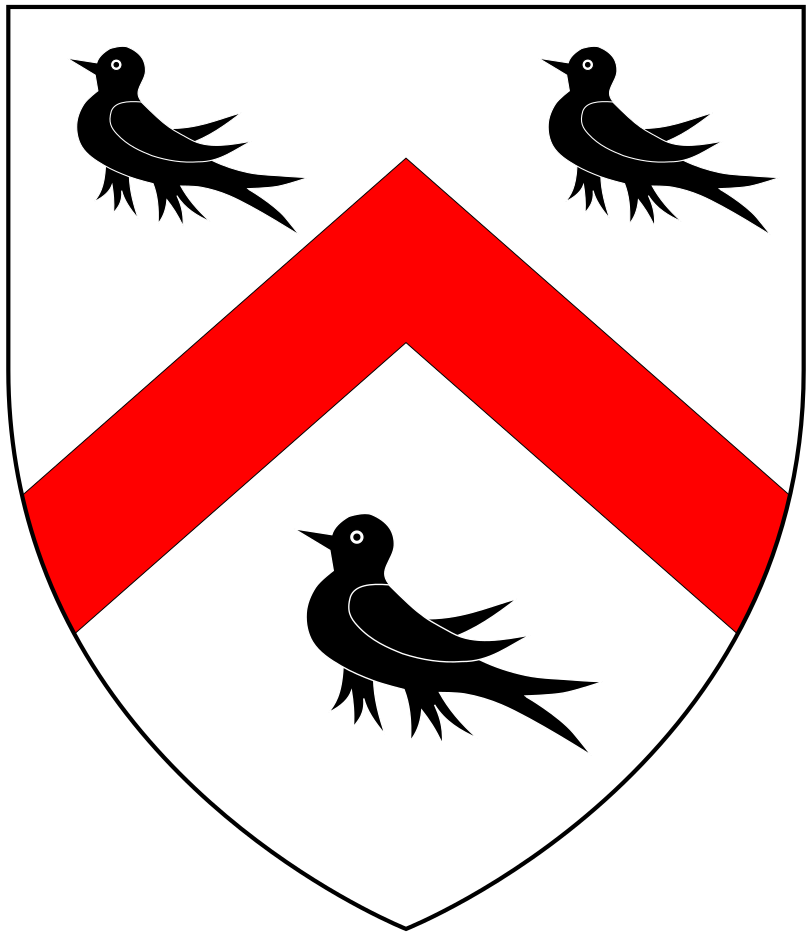
Arms of Hayne of Hayne: Argent, a chevron gules between three martlets sable

The manor was the seat of the Hayne (originally de Hayne) family, which had taken their surname from their seat. In the 16th century the family died out in the male line on the death of Walter Hayne, one of whose daughters and co-heiresses was Thomasine Hayne, whose share of her paternal inheritance was the manor of Hayne.

=== Harris ===
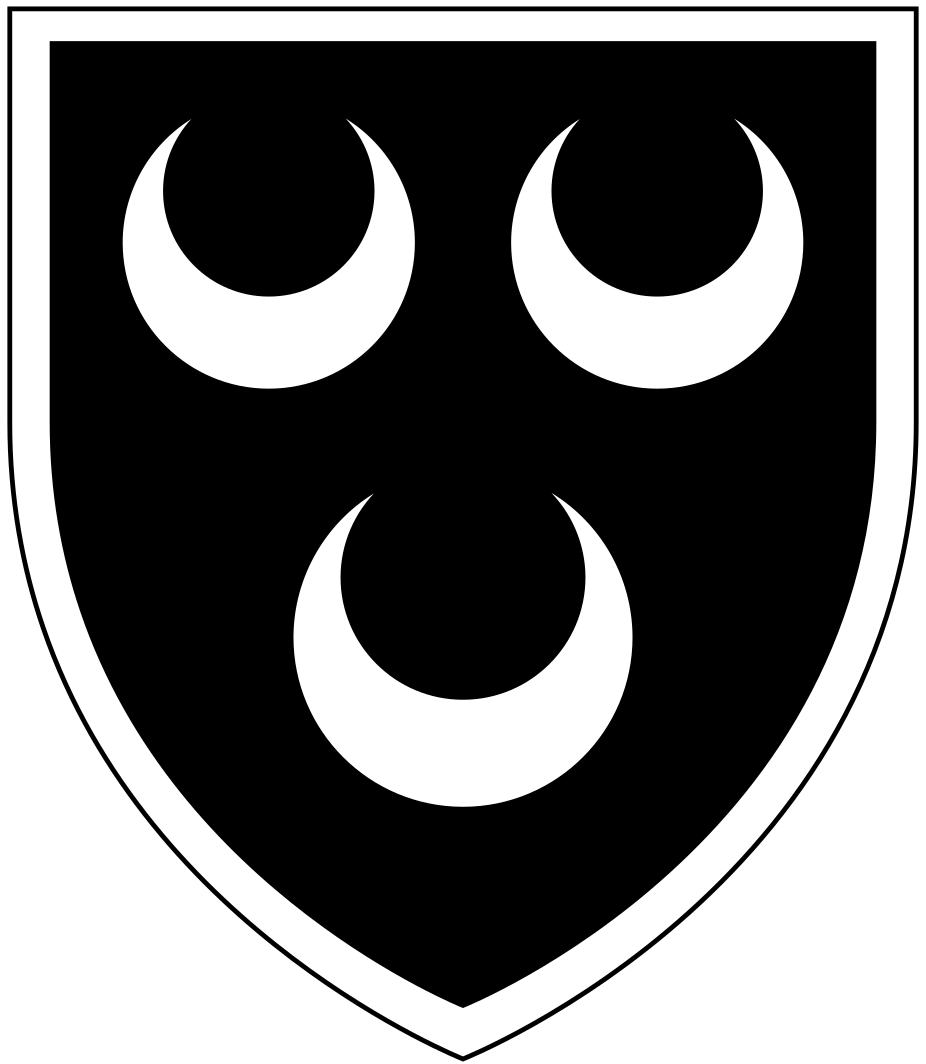
Arms of Harris of Hayne in the parish of Stowford, Devon: Sable, three crescents argent a bordure of the last These are the arms of Harris of Radford in the parish of Plymstock, Devon, the senior line of the family, differenced by a bordure

==== William Harris (died 1547) ====
Thomasine Hayne, heiress of Hayne, married William Harris (died 1547) of Stone in the parish of Lifton, Devon, son and heir of John Harris (second son of John Harris of Radford in the parish of Plymstock in Devon) by his wife, the heiress of the Stone family of Stone in the parish of Lifton, Devon. The manor remained the seat of this junior branch of the Harris family.

==== John Harris (1507–1551) ====
John Harris (1507–1551) of Hayne, son and heir, Serjeant-at-Law to King Edward VI and Recorder of Exeter, who married Elizabeth Kelle, daughter of Nicholas Kelle of Radcliffe and Southwick in Devon. He purchased the manor of Lifton.

==== William Harris (1524-1590/1) ====
William Harris (1524-1590/1) of Hayne, son and heir, whose monument is in Lifton Church, married Mary Greville, a daughter of Sir Fulke Greville (died 1559) of Beauchamps Court in Warwickshire, by his wife Elizabeth Willoughby, 3rd Baroness Willoughby de Broke (died 1562), grand daughter and heiress of Robert Willoughby, 2nd Baron Willoughby de Broke, the wealthiest heiress of her time. Mary Greville's brother was Fulke Greville, 4th Baron Willoughby de Broke (1536–1606) of Beauchamps Court.

==== Arthur Harris (1561–1628) ====
Arthur Harris (1561–1628) of Hayne and of Kenegie, Gulval, Cornwall, son and heir, Sheriff of Cornwall in 1603 and Captain of St Michael's Mount in Cornwall, married Margaret Davilles, daughter and sole heiress of John Davilles of Marland in the parish of Petrockstowe, Devon.

==== John Harris (c. 1586 – 1657) ====
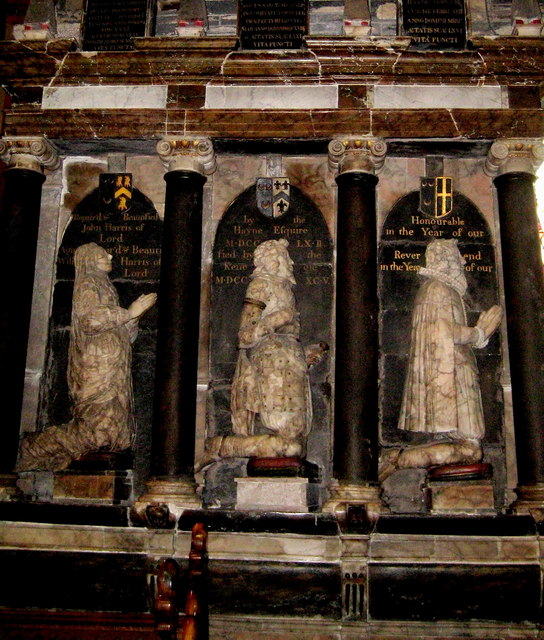
Monument in Lifton Church, Devon, to the Harris family of Hayne. The figure at far right is John Harris (1586-1656/7) of Hayne, MP. Above him are the arms of Harris impaling Mohun, for Cordelia Mohun, his second wife. At left is Florence Wyndham, his 1st wife, a daughter of Sir John Wyndham (1558–1645) of Orchard Wyndham in Somerset. Above her are the arms of Harris impaling Wyndham. In the centre is his father Arthur Harris (1561–1628) of Hayne, Sheriff of Cornwall in 1603 and Captain of St Michael's Mount in Cornwall. Above him are shown the arms of Harris impaling Davilles of Marland, Devon, for his wife Margaret Davilles

John Harris (c. 1586 – 1657), son and heir, of Hayne and of St. Michael's Mount in Cornwall, was a Member of Parliament. His elaborate monument with three kneeling effigies is in Lifton Church. He married twice:

- Firstly to Florence Wyndham (1595-1630/1), a daughter of Sir John Wyndham (1558–1645) of Orchard Wyndham in the parish of Watchet, Somerset. She died childless, aged 35.
- Secondly to Cordelia Mohun, a daughter of John Mohun, 1st Baron Mohun of Okehampton, by whom he had children:

==== Sir Arthur Harris, 1st Baronet (c. 1650 – 1686) ====
Sir Arthur Harris, 1st Baronet (c. 1650 – 1686) of Hayne, only son and heir, three times a Member of Parliament for Okehampton in Devon. he married Theophila Turner (died 1702), a daughter of John Turner, Serjeant-at-Law, of St Bride's in the City of London, and of York, by his wife Jane Pepys, a remote cousin of the diarist Samuel Pepys. The marriage was without children.

==== Christopher Harris (died 1687) ====
Christopher Harris (died 1687) of Hayne, first cousin, son of William Harris (younger brother of John Harris (c. 1586 – 1657) of Hayne) by his wife Philippa Noye, daughter and heiress of John Noye of Burian. His monument is in Stowford Church. He married Elizabeth Trott, a daughter of Martin Trott of Langridge in Essex.

==== William Harris (died 1709) ====
William Harris (died 1709) of Hayne, eldest son and heir, MP for St Ives in Cornwall and Okehampton in Devon and Sheriff of Devon in 1703. He married Jane St Aubyn, a daughter of John St Aubyn of Clowance, but died without children.

==== Christopher Harris (fl.1718) ====
Christopher Harris (fl.1718) of Hayne, younger brother, who succeeded to the estates under an entail. He married a certain Jane, of unrecorded family.

==== Christopher Harris (1687–1718) ====
Christopher Harris (1687–1718) of Hayne, eldest son and heir, MP for Okehampton. He married Mary Anne Buller (died 1726), a daughter of John Buller (1632–1716) of Morval in Cornwall, MP, but died childless.

==== John Harris (1689–1767) ====
John Harris (1689–1767) of Hayne, younger brother, Master of the Household to King George II and to his son King George III of the House of Hanover, thus known as Hanover Jack. He married Margaret Tuckfield (1686–1754), a daughter of Roger Tuckfield of Raddon, Devon, and widow of the wealthy Samuel Rolle (died 1717) of Heanton Satchville, Petrockstowe, Devon, MP, elected to Parliament 18 times. Rolle's daughter and sole heiress by Margaret Tuckfield was Margaret Rolle, 15th Baroness Clinton (1709–1781).

==== William Harris ====
William Harris of Hayne, younger brother. He married Jael Thomas (died 1770), a daughter of John Thomas of Tregolls in Cornwall. His daughter Jane Harris married William Arundell of Trengwainton in Cornwall and her son William Arundell (later "William Arundell-Haris") became the heir to the Harris estates of Lifton and Kenegie in Gulval, Cornwall.

==== Christopher Harris (1737–1775) ====
Christopher Harris (1737–1775) of Hayne, son and heir, who married Penelope Elizabeth Donnithorne (1742–1809), a daughter of Rev Isaac Donnithorne of St Agnes, Cornwall. He died leaving no sons, only two daughters who became co-heiresses to Hayne: Penelope Harris (1772–1860) who died unmarried and Elizabeth Harris (1773–1855), who married her relative Isaac Donnithorne (died 1848), son of Nicholas Donnithorne of St Agnes, Cornwall. His other estates of Lifton and Kenegie in Gulval, Cornwall, were inherited by his nephew William Arundell (1730–1792) (who adopted the surname "Arundell-Harris"). The latter's grandson William Arundell-Harris (1794–1865), Sheriff of Cornwall in 1817, built a grand new house at Lifton called Lifton Park, much in the same Gothic revival style as the new Hayne House. However, he got into debt and sold his new house to his son-in-law Henry Blagrove.

=== Donnithorne (Harris) ===
==== Isaac Donnithorne (Harris) (died 1848) ====
Isaac Donnithorne (died 1848) of Hayne, who married Elizabeth Harris (1773–1855), heiress of Hayne. He assumed the surname Harris in lieu of his patronymic, and rebuilt Hayne House in about 1810 in the Gothic revival style, which survives today.

==== Christopher Harris Mohun Harris (1801–1886) ====
Christopher Harris Mohun Harris (1801–1886) of Hayne, son, born as "Christopher Harris Donnithorne", like his father in 1878 he adopted the surname Harris, placing before it the additional surname of Mohun. He married Louisa Eleanora Watkins (died 1880), third daughter of Rev. Thomas Watkins of Penwyre in Breconshire, Wales. He sold Hayne in 1864 to the Blackburn family.

=== Blackburn ===
==== Edward Blackburn (1815–1887) ====
In 1867 the estate of Hayne was purchased by Edward Blackburn (1815–1887) He was the second son of Rev. Robert Blackburn (1812–1899), a Fellow of Brasenose College, Oxford, Rector of Selham in Sussex, who inherited from his mother's uncle, Rev Lancelot Bellas, the old Manor House, Brampton Hall, near Appleby in Westmorland. Edward's grandfather was Robert Blackburn (1779–1841) of the Island of Madeira, of Yorkshire ancestry, who married Mary Ballas, daughter of Rev. Thomas Bellas (formerly Balasyse) of Long Marton in Westmorland.

==== Arthur Blackburn (1849–1930) ====
Arthur Blackburn (1849–1930), second and eldest surviving son and heir, of Hayne. He sold Hayne and moved to Rock End, Torquay, Devon.

== Later owners ==
=== Macmillan ===
Hayne was owned by Alexander Macmillan, 2nd Earl of Stockton (b. 1943), grandson and heir of Harold Macmillan, 1st Earl of Stockton (1894–1986), Prime Minister of the United Kingdom, whose family wealth was derived from the publishing firm Macmillan Publishers. He had sold his grandfather's estate at Birch Grove in East Sussex. However, on becoming elected as a MEP he offered Hayne for sale in 2006 with its 300-acre (120 ha) estate for in excess of £5.5 million, through agents KVN Stockdale and Knight Frank, who called it "the most important West Country estate sale of 2006". In 2017 the estate is used as a commercial pheasant shoot, the spelling of the estate having been altered to "Haine Manor”.

== Sources ==
- Vivian, J.L., ed. (1895). The Visitations of the County of Devon, Comprising the Heralds' Visitations of 1531, 1564, & 1620. With additions by Lieutenant-Colonel J. L. Vivian. Exeter: Henry S. Eland.
