= Edward Young (priest) =

English dean

Edward Young was Dean of Exeter between 1662 and 1663. He was the father of Edward Young.

== Notes ==
Religious titles
Preceded by Seth Ward	Dean of Exeter; 1662–1663	Succeeded by George Cary
