= William Northmore =

British landowner and Tory politician

William Northmore (1690–1735), of Northmore House, Okehampton and Cleve, near Exeter, Devon, was a British landowner and Tory politician who sat in the House of Commons between 1713 and 1735.

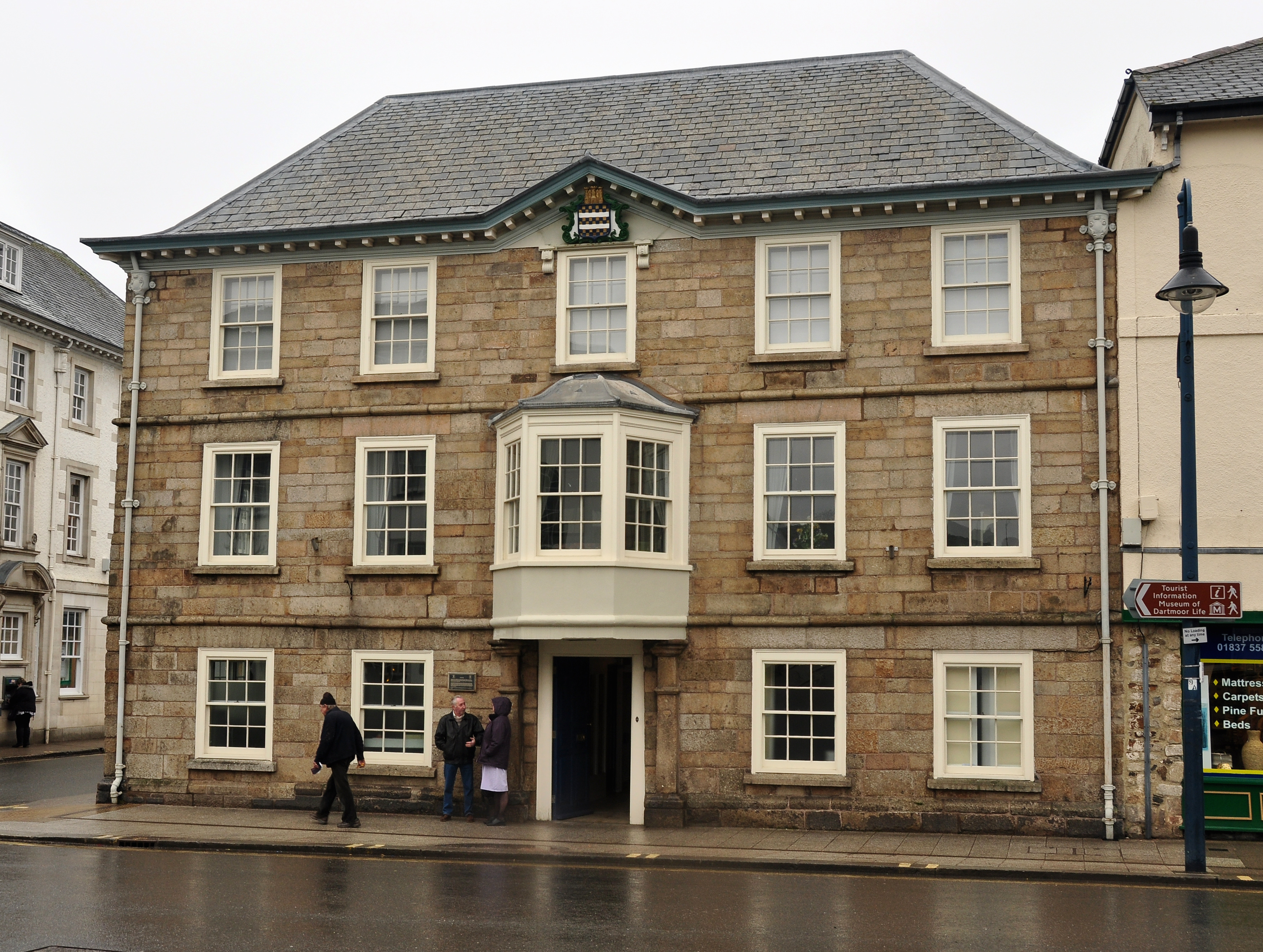
Northmore House, built in 1685, now the Town Hall in Okehampton

Northmore, who was baptized on 1 July 1690, was the only son of William Northmore of Throwleigh, near Okehampton, and his wife Anne Hutton, daughter of Rev. William Hutton, sometime rector of Northlew, near Okehampton, and of St. Kew, Cornwall. He married, by a settlement dated 25 August 1711, his cousin Anne Northmore, daughter of Thomas Northmore of Cleve. In 1713 he inherited Cleve from his uncle and father-in-law, who held many of the Monck estates in mortgage and directed in his will that they be sold for the benefit of his nephew and his wife.

Northmore was sometime Recorder of Okehampton and was returned as Tory Member of Parliament for Okehampton at the 1713 British general election. He was returned again at the 1715 British general election and voted against the Government in all recorded divisions.

Northmore succeeded his father in 1716. His first wife Anne died in 1717 and he married Florence Chichester as his second wife in May 1720. Florence was a daughter of Sir Arthur Chichester, 3rd Baronet. He did not stand at the 1722 British general election. Florence died in 1726.

Northmore resumed his seat at Okehampton at the 1727 British general election, voting with the Opposition against the Hessians in 1730 and the Excise Bill in 1733. He was returned again at the 1734 British general election.

Northmore married Elizabeth Oxenham as his third wife on 11 September 1734. Elizabeth's father was William Oxenham of Oxenham, Devon.

Northmore died on 17 March 1735 without children from any of his three marriages.

Parliament of Great Britain
Preceded by John Dibble; Christopher Harris	Member of Parliament for Okehampton; 1713–1722; With: Christopher Harris	Succeeded by Robert Pitt; John Crowley
Preceded by Robert Pitt; John Crowley	Member of Parliament for Okehampton; 1727–1735; With: Thomas Pitt	Succeeded by George Lyttelton; Thomas Pitt
