= Sir Arthur Harris, 1st Baronet, of Stowford =

English politician (d. 1686)

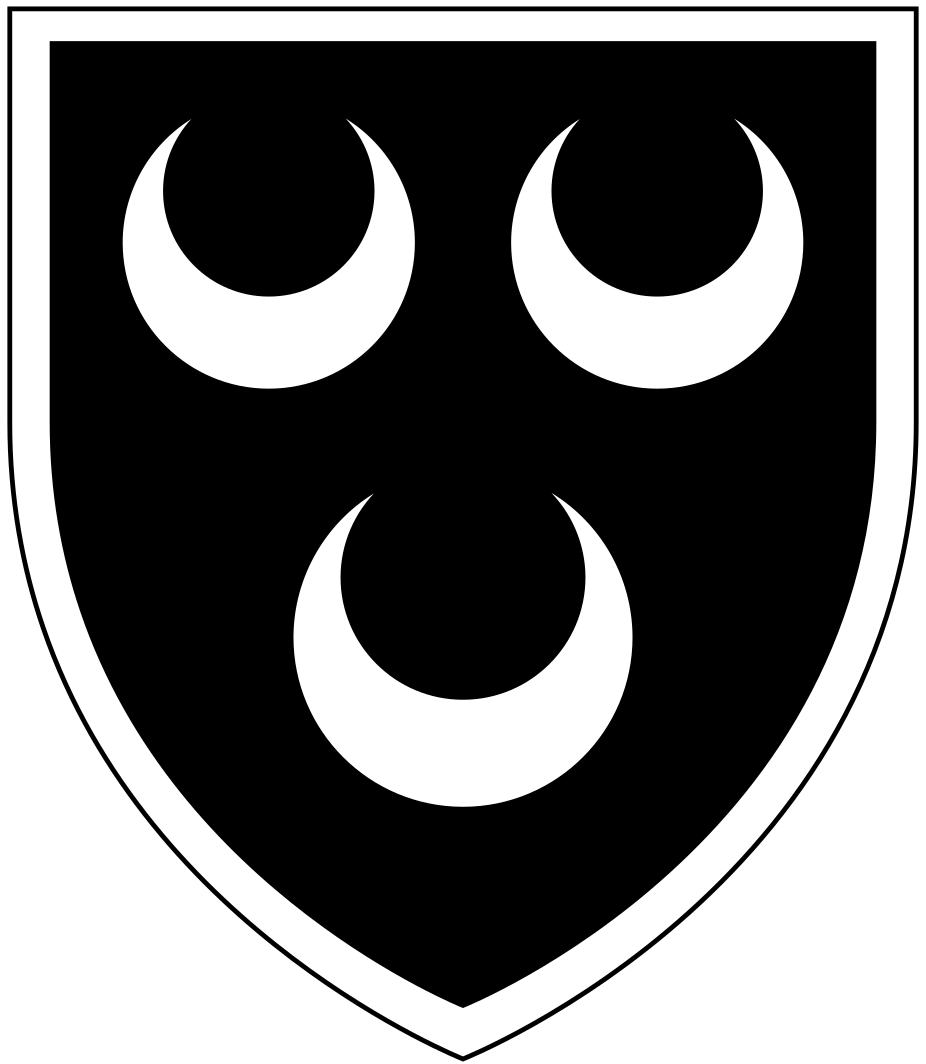
Arms of Harris of Hayne in the parish of Stowford, Devon: Sable, three crescents argent a bordure of the last. These are the arms of Harris of Radford in the parish of Plymstock, Devon, the senior line of the family, differenced by a bordure.

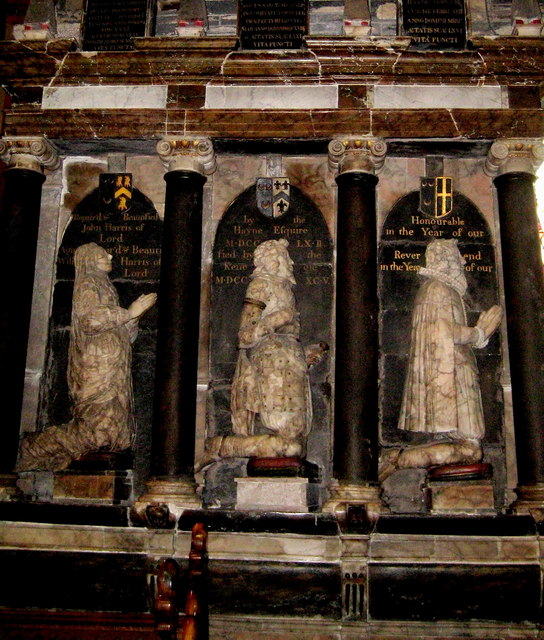
Monument in Lifton Church, Devon, to the Harris family of Hayne. The figure at far right is John Harris (1586–1656/7) of Hayne, MP, father of the 1st Baronet. Above him are the arms of Harris impaling Mohun, for Cordelia Mohun, mother of the 1st Baronet. At left is Florence Wyndham, 1st wife of the 1st Baronet's father, a daughter of Sir John Wyndham (1558–1645) of Orchard Wyndham in Somerset. In the centre is the 1st Baronet's grandfather Arthur Harris (1561–1628) of Hayne, Sheriff of Cornwall in 1603 and Captain of St Michael's Mount in Cornwall. Above him are shown the arms of Harris impaling Davilles of Marland, Devon, for his wife Margaret Davilles.

Sir Arthur Harris, 1st Baronet (c. 1650 – 1686) of Hayne in the parish of Stowford in Devon (about 11 miles south-west of Okehampton), was four-times elected as a Member of Parliament for Okehampton in Devon, between 1671 and 1685.

== Origins ==
He was the only son and heir of John Harris (c. 1586 – 1657) of Hayne in the parish of Stowford in Devon and of St. Michael's Mount in Cornwall, a Member of Parliament, by his second wife Cordelia Mohun daughter of John Mohun, 1st Baron Mohun of Okehampton.

== Career ==
He succeeded his father on 6 March 1657. In 1671 he was elected a Member of Parliament for Okehampton. He was created a baronet "of Stowford" on 1 December 1673. He was re-elected MP for Okehampton in the two elections of 1679 and in 1681.

== Marriage ==
He married (by licence dated 5 June 1673) Theophila Turner (d. 1702), a daughter of John Turner, Serjeant-at-Law, of St Bride's in the City of London, and of York, by his wife Jane Pepys, a remote cousin of the diarist Samuel Pepys. The marriage was childless. She survived her husband and died at Greenwich and was buried on 27 July 1702 at Lifton.

== Death and burial ==
He died at the age of about 36 and was buried on 20 February 1685/6 at Lifton, near Hayne, when the baronetcy became extinct.

Parliament of England
Preceded by Sir Thomas Hele, 1st Baronet; Edward Wise	Member of Parliament for Okehampton; 1671–1685; With: Edward Wise 1671–1677; Henry Northleigh 1677–1679; Josias Calmady 1679–1681; Sir George Cary 1681–1685	Succeeded by Sir Simon Leach; William Cary
Baronetage of England
New creation	Baronet (of Stowford); 1673–1686	Extinct
