= Humphrey Minchin =

British politician

Humphrey Minchin (1727–1796) was a British politician who sat in the House of Commons between 1778 and 1796.

Minchin was the eldest son of Paul Minchin of Ballinakill, King's County and his wife Henrietta Bunbury, daughter of Joseph Bunbury of Johnstown, county Carlow. He entered Trinity College, Dublin on 11 January 1742, aged 14. He married Clarinda Cuppidge, daughter of George Cuppidge of Dublin on 4 August 1750.

In 1774 Minchin canvassed Wootton Bassett but withdrew without becoming a candidate. He was elected Member of Parliament for Okehampton at a by-election on 11 June 1778 on the interest of John Spencer, 1st Earl Spencer.

He was commissioned as a Captain in the North Hampshire Militia on 24 April 1779, during the American War of Independence. He was later promoted to Major (14 April 1788) and Lieutenant-Colonel (24 May 1793) at the outbreak of the French Revolutionary War, retaining the position until his death.

He was re-elected to Wootton Bassett after a contest in 1780. In 1783 from April to December he was Clerk of the Ordnance. He was nominated again by the Spencer family at Okehampton in the 1784 general election. Although he was defeated, he petitioned and was seated on 27 April 1785. Spencer intended giving up his interest at Okehampton at the next election and made this clear to Minchin in the autumn of 1787 allowing him to keep the seat until the dissolution.

At the 1790 general election Minchin was returned for Bossiney, a seat that its patron Lord Mount Edgcumbe put at the disposal of government supporters. Minchin had given his support to Pitt and in return constantly bothered him throughout the Parliament for an Irish peerage, which never materialized.

Minchin died very suddenly on 26 March 1796 from a fit while hanging up his hat before dinner.

Parliament of Great Britain
Preceded by Richard Vernon; Alexander Wedderburn	Member of Parliament for Okehampton; 1778–1784; With: Richard Vernon	Succeeded by John Luxmoore; Thomas Wiggens
Preceded by John Luxmoore; Thomas Wiggens	Member of Parliament for Okehampton; 1785–1790; With: Viscount Malden	Succeeded by Colonel John St Leger; Robert Ladbroke
Preceded by Hon. Charles Stuart; Matthew Montagu	Member of Parliament for Bossiney; 1790–1796; With: Hon. James Archibald Stuart	Succeeded by Hon. Evelyn Pierrepont; Hon. James Archibald Stuart
