= Thomas Pitt of Boconnoc =

British politician

Thomas Pitt (c. 1705 – 17 July 1761), of Boconnoc, Cornwall, was a British landowner and politician who sat in the House of Commons between 1727 and 1761. He was Lord Warden of the Stannaries from 1742 to 1751.

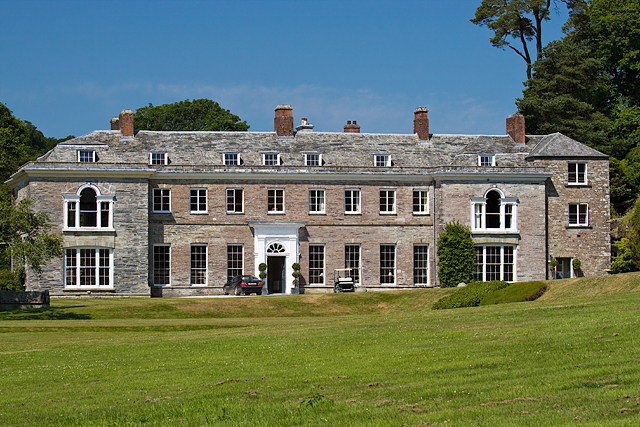
Boconnoc House, Cornwall

Pitt was the grandson and namesake of the better known Thomas Pitt and the son of Robert Pitt, MP, of Boconnoc, near Lostwithiel in Cornwall. His mother was Harriet Villiers, daughter of Edward FitzGerald-Villiers and the Irish heiress Katherine FitzGerald. Thomas Pitt was the elder brother of William Pitt the Elder. He succeeded his father in 1727 to his estates, including Boconnoc.

As head of the family, Pitt inherited both his grandfather's immense fortune and his parliamentary boroughs - he had the complete power to nominate both MPs at Old Sarum and one of the two at Okehampton, as well as considerable influence in at least two Cornish boroughs, Camelford and Grampound. He had himself elected Member of Parliament for Okehampton in 1727, the first election after he came of age, and represented the borough until 1754; but on a number of occasions he was also elected for Old Sarum, which meant that when he chose to sit for Okehampton the Old Sarum seat was free to offer at a by-election to somebody else who had failed to get into Parliament.

Pitt was Assay master of the Stannaries from March 1738 to February 1742 and Lord Warden of the Stannaries from February 1742 to March 1751, when the Cornish Stannary Parliament met for the last time.

Pitt was ambitious for political influence and, attaching himself to the retinue of Frederick, Prince of Wales, managed the general elections of 1741 and 1747 in Cornwall in the Prince's interests; but this involved massive expenditure - especially at the notoriously-corrupt Grampound, where he spent huge sums both on bribing the voters and on lawsuits attempting to deprive the most rapacious of their votes. By 1751 he had bankrupted himself, and the death that year of the Prince of Wales destroyed his hopes of securing influence or patronage for his efforts. He mortgaged his boroughs to the Treasury, allowing the government to name two MPs at Old Sarum and one at Okehampton in return for a pension of £1000 a year. After sitting briefly for Old Sarum in the 1754 Parliament, he resigned his seat and fled the country.

Returning to England in 1761, however, Pitt persuaded the government to allow him to be once more elected for Old Sarum - a temporary measure, he promised, to prevent his being arrested for debt until he was able satisfy his creditors. (MPs were immune from civil arrest.) He promised to relinquish the seat at the earliest possible moment and allow the government to name his replacement in accordance with the original arrangement; but he died a few months later, still MP for Old Sarum.

Pitt had married, c.1731, Christian, the daughter of Sir Thomas Lyttelton, 4th Baronet, M.P., of Hagley, Worcestershire and the sister of Lord Lyttelton. They had two sons and two daughters. He afterwards married, in 1761, Maria, the daughter of General Murray.

Pitt died on 17 July 1761. His only surviving son was the first Baron Camelford, who repudiated his father's arrangement for Old Sarum, and chose himself as MP when he inherited the borough.

Parliament of Great Britain
Preceded by Robert Pitt; John Crowley	Member of Parliament for Okehampton; 1727–1754; With: William Northmore 1727–1734; George Lyttelton 1734–1754	Succeeded by George Lyttelton; Robert Vyner
Preceded by John Pitt; George Pitt	Member of Parliament for Old Sarum; 1727–1728; With: The Earl of Londonderry	Succeeded by The Earl of Londonderry; Matthew St Quintin
Preceded by Matthew St Quintin; Thomas Harrison	Member of Parliament for Old Sarum; 1734–1735; With: Robert Nedham	Succeeded by Robert Nedham; William Pitt
Preceded by William Pitt; Edward Willes	Member of Parliament for Old Sarum; 1747; With: Sir William Irby, Bt	Succeeded by Earl of Middlesex; The Viscount Doneraile
Preceded by Earl of Middlesex; Simon Fanshawe	Member of Parliament for Old Sarum; 1754–1755; With: Viscount Pulteney	Succeeded by Viscount Pulteney; Sir William Calvert
Preceded by Viscount Pulteney; Sir William Calvert	Member of Parliament for Old Sarum; 1761; With: Howell Gwynne	Succeeded by Howell Gwynne; Thomas Pitt
Political offices
Vacant Title last held by Richard Edgcume	Lord Warden of the Stannaries; 1742–1751	Succeeded by The Earl Waldegrave
