= Richard Bateman-Robson =

English politician

Richard Bateman-Robson (1753 – 1827) was an English politician. He was born the younger son of Henry Holland, a builder of Church Row, Fulham, Middlesex. His elder brother was Henry Holland, the well-known architect and son in law of Lancelot "Capability" Brown, through his marriage to Brown's eldest daughter, Bridget. Richard married Elizabeth, the daughter and heiress of solicitor Bateman Robson of Hartford, Huntingdonshire and took the surnames of Bateman Robson by royal licence in 1791. They had no children.

By 1795 he had bought from the 5th Duke of Bedford an estate at Okehampton which gave him control over one of the borough's parliamentary seats and was returned unopposed the following year. He was a Member of Parliament (MP) for Okehampton from 1796 to 1802 and 1806 to 1807, for Honiton on 11 April 1806 – 1806 and for Shaftesbury in 1812 – 19 February 1813. He became Chairman of Grand Junction Waterworks Company in 1817.
