= Charles Mompesson =

English politician (1670–1714)

Charles Mompesson (26 January 1670 – 12 July 1714) was an English Whig politician. He sat as MP for Old Sarum from 1698 till 1705, 11 December 1705 till 1708 and Wilton from 1708 till 1713.

== Life ==
He was the oldest surviving son of Sir Thomas Mompesson and his second wife. He was educated at Salisbury School and matriculated at Peterhouse College, Cambridge in 1688, he earned an MA in 1690. He entered Lincoln's Inn in 1689. On 17 August 1703, he married Elizabeth Longueville (died 1751), the daughter of William Longueville and they had one son.

In 1701, he oversaw the construction of the Mompesson House, which would become his residence until his death in 1714. His marriage with Longueville in 1703 was celebrated with the creation of a cartouche over their front door containing their coat of arms.

== Political career ==
In 1698, he was returned as MP for Old Sarum, succeeding his father. He was re-elected to Old Sarum in both Parliaments of 1701. On 13 February 1703, he voted in favour of the Lords' amendments to the bill extending the time for taking the Oath of Abjuration. He did not support the Tack (an attempt to attach anti-Dissenting legislation to a money bill). In 1705, he was involved in a disputed election return and was declared duly elected on 11 December 1705. On 21 December 1705, he was granted leave to recover his health. He returned to Parliament on 7 January 1706 and drafted a private estate bill and successfully guided it through the Commons.

In early 1708, he did not contest Old Sarum due to financial difficulties. He was transferred to Wilton. In 1709, he voted for the Naturalization of the Palatines Bill and in 1710, voted for the impeachement of Dr Henry Sacheverell and was re-elected for Wilton. On 18 June 1713, he retired from politics.

== Death ==
He died on 12 July 1714 and was buried at Salisbury Cathedral.
