= Albany Savile =

Albany Savile (c. 1783 – 26 January 1831), known until about 1798 as Albany Atkinson, was an English landed gentleman, barrister, and master of foxhounds who sat as one of the members of Parliament for Okehampton from 1807 to 1820.

Savile was the only legitimate son of Christopher Atkinson Saville, of 3 Park Street, Mayfair, and Hill Hall, Hales, Norfolk, by his second wife, Jane, daughter and coheiress of John Savile, linen draper of Clay Hill, Enfield, Middlesex. While he was a boy, his father changed his surname from Atkinson to his wife's, Savile. He was educated at Christ Church, Oxford, where he matriculated on 11 May 1802, aged 18, and at Lincoln's Inn, which he joined in 1804. In 1807 he was elected as a member of Parliament for Okehampton, a pocket borough with two seats in parliament where his property gave him complete control, and was appointed as the borough's recorder, but he was not called to the bar until 1817.

Savile was an enthusiast for fox hunting, serving as a master of foxhounds and writing on the subject.

Savile was independent-minded in his politics. In 1818, he and his father were both elected for Okehampton. In 1819, his father died, and Savile inherited the whole of his father’s estate, valued at almost £60,000, equivalent to £5,749,704 in 2023. In 1820, he was commissioned as a Captain into the East Devon militia. At the general election of 1820 he had himself elected again for Okehampton, together with Lord Dunalley, a supporter of Lord Liverpool's ministry, but only seven weeks later by taking the Chiltern Hundreds he gave up his seat for Lord Glenorchy, a Whig and a fellow member of Brooks's. After that he sold the two seats in parliament provided by his borough and died in January 1831 from “an inflammatory affection”.

On 7 March 1815, Savile married Eleanora Elizabeth, a daughter of Sir Bourchier Wrey, of Tawstock Court, Barnstaple, Devon, and they had eight sons and five daughters. Most of his estate, valued at under £25,000, including his property in the borough of Okehampton, went to his eldest son, Albany Bourchier Savile, who was a minor.

One of Savile’s younger sons, Lieutenant-Colonel John Walter Savile, was the father of Leopold Halliday Savile (1870–1953), a civil engineer. Other sons were Bourchier Wrey Savile (1817–1888), a clergyman, and Brigadier-General Walter Clare Savile.

== Arms ==
Arms

Savile’s coat of arms is blazoned Argent, on a bend sable three owls of the field.
