= Robert Nedham =

British-Jamaican plantation owner and politician

Robert Nedham (1703 – August 1762) was a British-Jamaican plantation owner and politician who sat in the House of Commons for the rotten borough of Old Sarum from 1734 to 1741.

== Early life ==
Robert Nedham was the son of Robert Nedham, a slave owner in Jamaica. He settled permanently in England on his estates at Newry, County Down and at Oxford, Oxfordshire.

== Personal life ==
Nedham married Catherine Pitt, the daughter of Harriet Villiers and Robert Pitt, who also served as MP for Old Sarum.
