= Henry Northleigh =

17th-century English politician

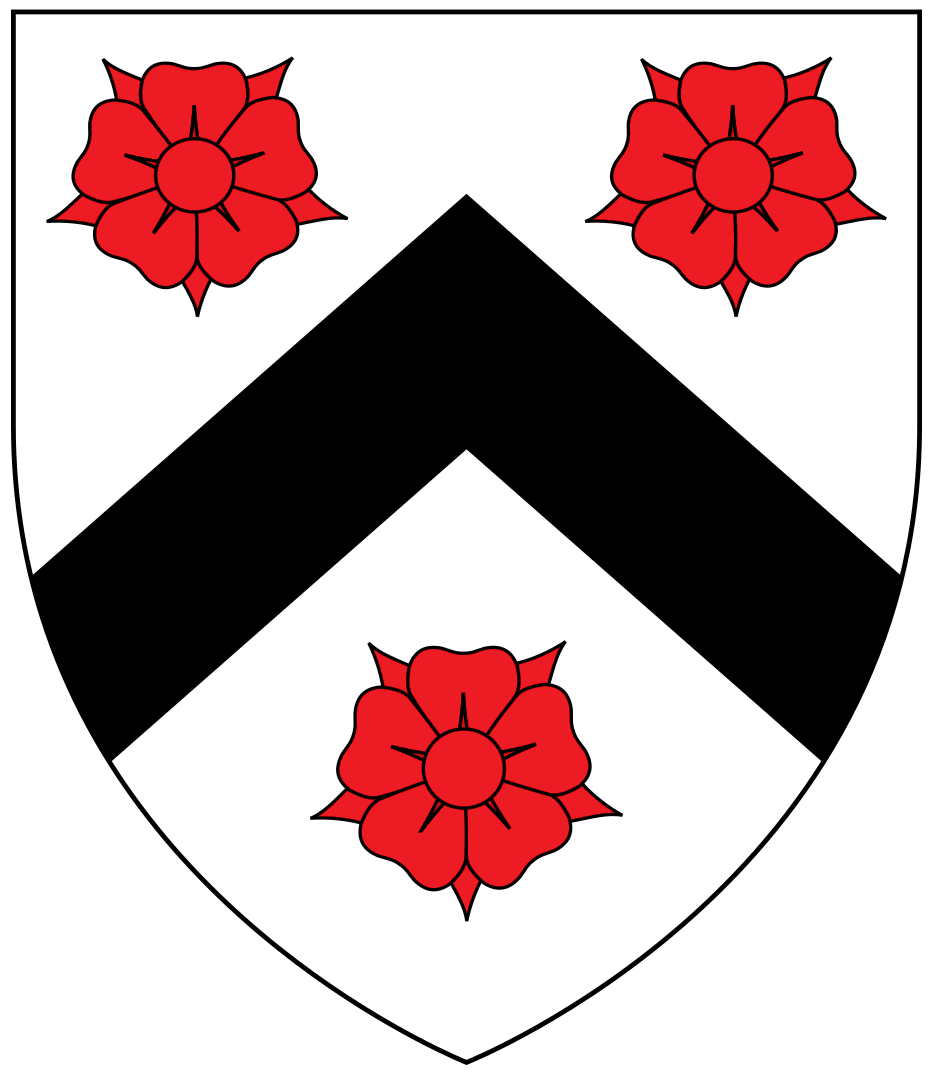
Arms of Northleigh of Northleigh in the parish of Inwardleigh, Devon: Argent, a chevron sable between three roses gules

Henry Northleigh (1643–1694) of Peamore in the parish of Exminster in Devon, was the MP (elected thrice) for Okehampton in Devon.

== Life ==
He was the 2nd but eldest surviving son and heir of Henry Northleigh (1612–1675) of Peamore, Exminster, in Devon by his wife Lettice Yard, a daughter of Edward Yard of Churston Ferrers in Devon. He was educated at King's College, Cambridge from 1660, and entered the Middle Temple in 1663.

He served as MP for Okehampton in 1677, as High Sheriff of Devon for 1680–81, and again as MP for Okehampton in 1689 and 1690–1694.

== Marriage and children ==
He married Susanna Sparke, daughter of John Sparke, dyer, of Exeter. She was the granddaughter of Stephen Toller, haberdasher of Exeter, who in 1673 purchased "Crediton Parks", the former park of the Bishops of Exeter, from Sir John Chichester of Hall, Bishop's Tawton. Susanna devised Crediton Parks to her daughter Susanna Northleigh, who devised it to her nephew John Tuckfield (c. 1719–1767) of Little Fulford, MP for Exeter, the eldest son of her sister Elizabeth Northleigh by her husband Roger Tuckfield of London, Merchant. By his wife he had children including:

- Stephen Northleigh (c. 1692–?1731) of Peamore (son), MP for Totnes (1713–1722), which seat he obtained on the interest of his cousins the Yarde family. He married Margaret Davie, daughter of Sir William Davie, 4th Baronet (1662–1707), of Creedy House in the parish of Sandford, Devon. He died without male children, leaving his daughter Mary Northleigh (d. 1773) as heiress, who in 1739 married John Hippisley Coxe (1715–1769) of Ston Easton, Somerset John Hippisley Coxe built the Palladian mansion Ston Easton Park in Somerset.

== Death ==
He died in 1694, as is recorded on his ledger stone in Alphington church, near Peamore.
