= Okehampton (constituency) =

Former parliamentary constituency in the United Kingdom

- Former borough constituency for the House of Commons

1640–1832
- Seats: Two

Okehampton was a parliamentary borough in Devon, which elected two Members of Parliament (MPs) to the House of Commons in 1301 and 1313, then continuously from 1640 to 1832, when the borough was abolished by the Great Reform Act.

== History ==
The borough consisted of part of the parish of Okehampton, an entirely rural area with the small market town of Okehampton itself at its centre. In 1831, the population of the borough was 1,508, and contained 318 houses; the whole parish had a population of 2,055.

From its revival in the 17th century, the right to vote in Okehampton rested with all the freeholders and freemen of the borough, but the Town Corporation had considerable influence over the rest of the voters, and when it was unable to have its way by persuasion did not always stop short of outright coercion. In 1705 at the corporation's instigation an Okehampton freeman was forced into the army, and then offered his discharge if he would vote for Sir Simon Leach. (This was illegal on every count, for voters had statutory exemption from impressment.)

Through control of the corporation (which like most at that period was self-electing), the main local landowners or "patrons" of the borough could therefore be sure of being able to choose Okehampton's MPs; this favour was maintained either by direct expenditure or by working for the interests of the Corporation members in other ways. As landowners they also had power to create voters directly, since they could convey the freehold of parcels of their land in the borough to reliable placemen. In the mid 18th century, the patrons were Thomas Pitt and the Duke of Bedford, and each was regarded as having unrestrained power to nominate one MP.

However, Pitt mortgaged his seat to the government after going bankrupt in 1754, so that at the next two elections the ministry could nominate a member. The government had to secure this influence by exercising patronage, and Namier quotes a number of letters that show how the process worked in Okehampton. In 1759, the corporation was eager for the promotion of a local naval officer, Lieutenant Joseph Hunt. The Prime Minister, the Duke of Newcastle, urged Lord Anson, the First Lord of the Admiralty, to promote Hunt because "the interest of the borough of Oakhampton ... absolutely depends upon it. The King expects that I should keep up his interest in boroughs; I can't do it without I have the assistance of the several branches of the Government." Anson grudgingly replied that whenever the borough became vacant by the death of the sitting member he would promote Hunt to a command, but he also protested that the frequent demands to use naval patronage for political reasons weakened the navy "which has done more mischeif to the publick ... than the loss of a vote in the House of Commons".

In the event the sitting member, Thomas Potter, died just two days later and the following day Hunt was promoted to Commander. The new MP was a Rear-Admiral, George Brydges Rodney, and he seems to have secured his election with the promise of further preferment for Hunt: 18 months later, on the eve of the next general election, the government's election-manager in Okehampton wrote to Rodney to remind him that he had promised that Hunt should be made his flag Captain as soon as he had a ship. Rodney, knowing that Anson was unlikely to agree to promote Hunt again, wrote asking Newcastle to help by insisting upon it; but, instead, Rodney was persuaded to stand at Penryn rather than Okehampton, and the captaincy of the flagship went to a Penryn man. (In fact Hunt got his promotion the same month, December 1760, but was killed in action the following year.)

Circumstances in Okehampton were somewhat changed at the end of the 18th century, however, by the judgments in two disputed elections. In 1791, there was a petition against the result of an election at which the patrons – who were, by this time, the Duke of Bedford and Earl Spencer – had created 72 new voters by conveying them freeholds a few weeks before the election. The Commons committee that heard the petition declared all 72 votes invalid.

Spencer and Bedford shortly afterwards sold their interest in the borough, and it was eventually bought by Albany Savile for £60,000. A second disputed election in 1810 led to a judgment that reaffirmed and strengthened the patron's power: on this occasion, it was determined that the franchise belonged to the freeholders and freemen of the borough, and further that the patron had the right to create freemen at will. This, of course, gave him total control of elections since he could create new voters without limit to swamp any opposition. Nevertheless, the relationship was not one-sided, and Savile did much for the town, lending considerable sums to the Corporation which were never repaid.

In 1816 there were 220 voters.

Okehampton was abolished as a constituency by the Reform Act. The borough was on the boundary between the new Northern Devon and Southern Devon county divisions, and its voters were divided between the two from 1832.

== Members of Parliament ==
Okehampton re-enfranchised by Parliament in Nov 1640

=== 1640–1832 ===
Year	First member	First party	Second member	Second party
November 1640	Edward Thomas	Parliamentarian	Lawrence Whitaker	Parliamentarian
December 1648	Thomas excluded in Pride's Purge – seat vacant		Lawrence Whitaker	Parliamentarian
1653	Okehampton was unrepresented in the Barebones Parliament and the First and Second Parliaments of the Protectorate			
January 1659	Robert Everland		Edward Wise	
May 1659	Not represented in the restored Rump			
1660	Josias Calmady I		Edward Wise	
1661	Sir Thomas Hele		Edward Wise	
1671	Sir Arthur Harris		Edward Wise	
1677	Sir Arthur Harris		Henry Northleigh	
1679	Sir Arthur Harris		Josias Calmady II	
1681	Sir Arthur Harris		Sir George Cary	
1685	Sir Simon Leach	Tory	William Cary	Tory
1689	Henry Northleigh		William Cary	Tory
1694	John Burrington	Whig	William Cary	Tory
1695	John Burrington	Whig	Thomas Northmore	Tory
1698	William Harris	Tory	Thomas Northmore	Tory
1702	Sir Simon Leach	Tory	Thomas Northmore	Tory
1705	John Dibble	Whig	Thomas Northmore	Tory
1708	John Dibble	Whig	William Harris	
1709	John Dibble	Whig	Christopher Harris	
1713	William Northmore	Tory	Christopher Harris	
1722	Robert Pitt		John Crowley	
1727	William Northmore	Tory	Thomas Pitt	
1735	George Lyttelton		Thomas Pitt	
1754	George Lyttelton		Robert Vyner	
1756	William Pitt (the Elder)	Whig	Robert Vyner	
1757	Thomas Potter		Robert Vyner	
1759	Rear Admiral George Brydges Rodney		Robert Vyner	
1761	Alexander Forrester		Wenman Coke	
1768	Thomas Pitt		Thomas Brand	
1770	Thomas Pitt		Hon. Richard Fitzpatrick	
1774	Richard Vernon		Alexander Wedderburn	Tory
1778	Richard Vernon		Humphrey Minchin	
1784	John Luxmoore		Thomas Wiggens	
1785	Viscount Malden		Humphrey Minchin	
1790	Colonel John St Leger		Robert Ladbroke	
1796	Thomas Tyrwhitt	Whig	Richard Bateman-Robson	Whig
1802	Henry Holland, junior	Whig	James Charles Stuart Strange	Whig
1804	Henry Holland, junior	Whig	Viscount Althorp	Whig
1806	Richard Bateman-Robson	Whig	Joseph Foster-Barham	Whig
1807	Gwyllym Lloyd Wardle	Whig	Albany Savile	Tory
1812	The Lord Graves	Tory	Albany Savile	Tory
1818	Christopher Savile	Tory	Albany Savile	Tory
1819	The Lord Dunalley	Whig	Albany Savile	Tory
1820	The Lord Dunalley	Whig	Lord Glenorchy	Whig
1824	William Henry Trant	Tory	Lord Glenorchy	Whig
1826	Sir Compton Domvile	Tory	Joseph Strutt	Tory
1830	Lord Seymour	Tory	George Agar-Ellis	Whig
April 1831	William Henry Trant	Tory	John Thomas Hope	Tory
July 1831	Sir Richard Vyvyan	Tory	John Thomas Hope	Tory
1832	Constituency abolished			
