= Simon Leach (Member of Parliament) =

English Tory politician

Sir Simon Leach (c. 1652 – June 1708) was an English Tory politician.

== Biography ==
Leach was the son of Simon Leach and Bridget Grenville, the daughter of Sir Bevil Grenville. His father died in 1660. Soon after the Stuart Restoration, he was appointed a Knight of the Bath by Charles II on 23 April 1661. On 18 June 1673, Leach married Mary, the daughter of Thomas Clifford, 1st Baron Clifford.

In 1685, he was returned to the Loyal Parliament as a Tory Member of Parliament for Okehampton. He was identified with High Tory politics. In May 1692 he was arrested as a Jacobite suspect together with his brother-in-law, Hugh Clifford, 2nd Baron Clifford of Chudleigh, but he was released without trial. In 1694 Leach was regarded by the English government as one of the leading Jacobites in Devon and the following year he was removed from his role as a justice of the peace.

Leach was re-elected to parliament in the 1702 English general election, again representing Okehampton. After a bitter contest for the seat in the 1705 English general election, Leach was unable to take his seat owing to a double return; on 20 December the House of Commons declared him not duly elected, in favour of the Whig John Dibble.
