= Thomas Northmore (politician) =

English politician

Arms of Northmore: Gules, a lion rampant or armed and langued azure crowned with an eastern crown argent

Thomas Northmore (c.1643-1713) of Cleve in the parish of St Thomas, Exeter, in Devon was a Barrister-at-Law, a Master in Chancery and a Member of Parliament for Okehampton in Devon 1695–1708.

== Origins ==
He was the 4th son of John Northmore (d.1671) of Well in the parish of South Tawton and of Okehampton and East Ash, all in Devon, an Attorney of the Court of King's Bench and Forester of Dartmoor, by his wife Joan Stronge (d.1686) a daughter of John Stronge of Torr Hill (alias Thornhill). Thomas's eldest brother was John Northmore (1635/6-1713) who in 1684 was appointed as the first town clerk of Okehampton. Thomas's younger brother was Jeffery Northmore (1643-1724) of Well, whose descendants by his second wife Grace Risdon continued at Cleve and Well. Jeffery's great grandson was Thomas Northmore (1766–1851), writer, inventor, geologist and antiquary.

== Career ==
In 1705 he purchased the manor of Cleve in the parish of St Thomas, Exeter. In 1695 Northmore was elected as one of the two Members of Parliament for Okehampton. As a lawyer of the Inner Temple he acted as a business agent to various members of the Devonshire gentry, including Richard Coffin (1623-1700) of Portledge in the parish of Alwington, Devon, Sheriff of Devon in 1685, to whom he acted as Sheriff-Deputy. Following the defeat of the Monmouth Rebellion, he supervised the Bloody Assizes of Judge Jeffreys, commencing on 25 August 1685. He was ordered by Jeffreys to arrange for the whipping of prisoners "only in the greater and more general markets", to economise on expenditure. He informed Coffin that about 400 rebels had been condemned at Taunton and 700 at Wells, of whom 100 were to be executed and the rest transported. He added: "another such year's trouble I will not undertake for £500".

== Marriages and children ==
He married three times:

- Firstly to Anne Pridham (d. 8 April 1686), whose monument survives in St Thomas's Church, Exeter, by whom he had two daughters:
  - Elizabeth Northmore (1680-1683), died in infancy;
  - Anne Northmore (died 1717), eldest surviving daughter and heiress, who married, in 1711, her cousin William Northmore (1690-1735), later Member of Parliament for Okehampton. She died 6 years later without children.
- Secondly in 1686/7 he married Elizabeth Andrew (died 1689), a daughter of Soloman Andrew of Lyme Regis in Dorset, Sheriff of Dorset in 1697. Without children.
- Thirdly in 1690 to Elizabeth St Aubyn (d.1735/6), a daughter of John St Aubyn of Clowance in Cornwall. Without children.

== Death, burial & succession ==
He died on 25 July 1713, leaving no sons, and was buried in St. Thomas's Church, Exeter, where survives his monument, displaying the arms of Northmore, of his first wife, of Andrew of Dorset (Sable, a saltire argent between four crosses crosslet or) and of St Aubyn of Clowance (Ermine, on a cross gules five bezants). He named as his heir his nephew and son-in-law William Northmore to whom he bequeathed the manor of Cleve and several other properties in Devon and elsewhere, mortgages on the estates of Christopher Monck, 2nd Duke of Albemarle, a fellow Devonian, and two-thirds of Topsham Quay in Exeter.
