= List of MPs elected in the 1820 United Kingdom general election =

1820–1826 Parliament of the United Kingdom
←	1818–1820 Parliament	1826–1830 Parliament	→
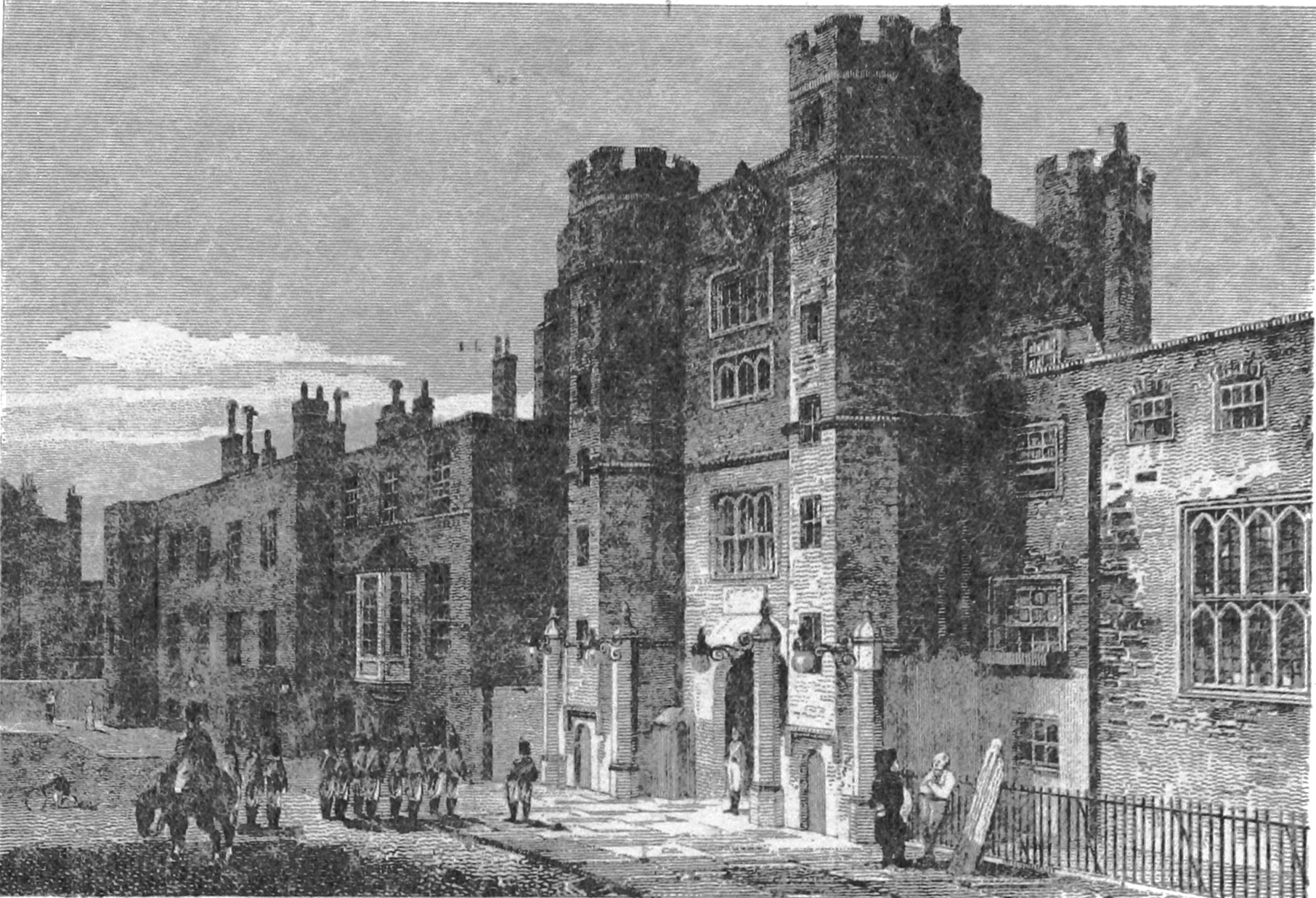
- The Palace of Westminster in 1820

Overview
- Legislative body: Parliament of the United Kingdom
- Jurisdiction: United Kingdom
- Meeting place: Palace of Westminster
- Term: 21 April 1820 – 2 June 1826
- Election: 1820 United Kingdom general election

House of Commons
- Speaker: Charles Manners-Sutton

House of Lords
- Lord Chancellor: John Scott, 1st Earl of Eldon

Crown-in-Parliament George IV

Sessions
- 1st: 21 April 1820 – 23 November 1820
- 2nd: 23 January 1821 – 11 July 1821
- 3rd: 5 February 1822 – 6 August 1822
- 4th: 4 February 1823 – 19 July 1823
- 5th: 3 February 1824 – 25 June 1824
- 6th: 3 February 1825 – 6 July 1825
- 7th: 2 February 1826 – 31 May 1826

This is a list of Members of Parliament (MPs) elected to the House of Commons of the United Kingdom at the 1820 United Kingdom general election, arranged by constituency. The parliament was summoned 21 April 1820 and dissolved 2 June 1826. The Prime Minister throughout was the leader of the Tory Party, the Earl of Liverpool.

Table of contents:

A B C D E F G H I K L M N O P Q R S T W Y Changes

== A ==
Constituency	MP	Party
Aberdeen Burghs	Joseph Hume	Whig
Aberdeenshire	James Ferguson	Tory
Abingdon	John Maberly	Whig
Aldborough (two members)	Henry Fynes Clinton	Tory
Aldborough (two members)	Gibbs Antrobus	Tory
Aldeburgh (two members)	Joshua Walker	Tory
Aldeburgh (two members)	James Blair	Tory
Amersham (two members)	William Tyrwhitt-Drake	Tory
Amersham (two members)	Thomas Tyrwhitt-Drake	Tory
Andover (two members)	Thomas Assheton Smith	Tory
Andover (two members)	John Pollen	Tory
Anglesey	Henry Paget	Whig
Anstruther Burghs	Sir William Rae, Bt	Tory
County Antrim (two members)	Hon. John Bruce O'Neill	Tory
County Antrim (two members)	Hugh Henry John Seymour	Tory
Appleby (two members)	Adolphus Dalrymple	Tory
Appleby (two members)	George Tierney	Whig
Argyllshire	Lord John Campbell	Whig
Armagh City	William Stuart	Tory
County Armagh (two members)	Hon. Henry Caulfeild	Whig
County Armagh (two members)	Charles Brownlow	Whig
Arundel (two members)	Robert Blake	
Arundel (two members)	Viscount Bury	
Ashburton (two members)	Lawrence Palk	
Ashburton (two members)	John Copley	Tory
Athlone	John McClintock	Tory
Aylesbury (two members)	George Nugent-Grenville	Whig
Aylesbury (two members)	William Rickford	Whig
Ayr Burghs	Thomas Francis Kennedy	Whig
Ayrshire	James Montgomerie	
== B ==
Constituency	MP	Party
Banbury	Heneage Legge	
Bandon Bridge	James Bernard	Tory
Banffshire	James Duff, 4th Earl Fife	
Barnstaple (two members)	Michael Nolan	
Barnstaple (two members)	Francis Molyneux Ommanney	
Bath (two members)	John Thynne	
Bath (two members)	Charles Palmer	
Beaumaris	Thomas Frankland Lewis	
Bedford (two members)	Lord George Russell	Whig
Bedford (two members)	William Henry Whitbread	Whig
Bedfordshire (two members)	Marquess of Tavistock	Whig
Bedfordshire (two members)	Francis Pym	Whig
Belfast	Earl of Belfast	Tory
Bere Alston (two members)	Henry Percy	
Bere Alston (two members)	George Percy	
Berkshire (two members)	Richard Neville	Whig
Berkshire (two members)	Charles Dundas	Whig
Berwick-upon-Tweed (two members)	Viscount Ossulton	
Berwick-upon-Tweed (two members)	Sir David Milne	
Berwickshire	Sir John Marjoribanks, Bt	Liberal Party (UK)
Beverley (two members)	George Lane-Fox	Tory
Beverley (two members)	John Wharton	Whig
Bewdley	Wilson Aylesbury Roberts	Tory
Bishop's Castle (two members)	William Holmes	Tory
Bishop's Castle (two members)	Edward Rogers	
Bletchingley (two members)	Hon. Edward Henry Edwardes	
Bletchingley (two members)	Marquess of Titchfield	Whig
Bodmin (two members)	John Wilson Croker	Tory
Bodmin (two members)	Davies Gilbert	
Boroughbridge (two members)	Richard Spooner	Radical
Boroughbridge (two members)	Marmaduke Lawson	Whig
Bossiney (two members)	John Ward	Tory
Bossiney (two members)	Compton Pocklington Domvile	
Boston (two members)	Gilbert Heathcote	Whig
Boston (two members)	Henry Ellis	
Brackley (two members)	Robert Haldane Bradshaw	Tory
Brackley (two members)	Henry Wrottesley	Tory
Bramber (two members)	William Wilberforce	Independent
Bramber (two members)	John Irving	
Brecon	George Gould Morgan	Tory
Breconshire	Thomas Wood	Tory
Bridgnorth (two members)	Thomas Whitmore	
Bridgnorth (two members)	William Whitmore	
Bridgwater (two members)	William Astell	Tory
Bridgwater (two members)	Charles Kemeys Kemeys Tynte	Whig
Bridport (two members)	James Scott	
Bridport (two members)	Christopher Spurrier	
Bristol (two members)	Richard Hart Davis	Tory
Bristol (two members)	Henry Bright	Whig
Buckingham (two members)	George Nugent	
Buckingham (two members)	William Henry Fremantle	
Buckinghamshire (two members)	Richard Temple-Grenville	Tory
Buckinghamshire (two members)	Hon. Robert Smith	Whig
Bury St Edmunds (two members)	Lord John FitzRoy	
Bury St Edmunds (two members)	Hon. Arthur Upton	
Buteshire	Lord Patrick Crichton-Stuart	
== C ==
Constituency	MP	Party
Caernarfon	Sir Charles Paget	
Caernarvonshire	Sir Robert Williams, Bt	
Caithness	no return - alternating constituency with Buteshire	
Callington (two members)	Sir Christopher Robinson	Tory
Callington (two members)	Hon. Edward Pyndar Lygon	Tory
Calne (two members)	James Macdonald	
Calne (two members)	James Abercromby	Whig
Cambridge (two members)	Frederick Tench	Tory
Cambridge (two members)	Charles Madryll Cheere	Tory
Cambridgeshire (two members)	Lord Charles Manners	
Cambridgeshire (two members)	Lord Francis Osborne	
Cambridge University	Henry John Temple, 3rd Viscount Palmerston	Tory
Cambridge University	John Henry Smyth	Whig
Camelford (two members)	Mark Milbank	Whig
Camelford (two members)	Francis Seymour-Conway	Tory
Canterbury (two members)	Stephen Rumbold Lushington	Tory
Canterbury (two members)	Edward Bligh, Lord Clifton	Whig
Cardiff	Wyndham Lewis	
Cardigan	Pryse Pryse	Liberal
Cardiganshire	William Edward Powell	Tory
Carlisle (two members)	Sir James Graham, Bt	Tory
Carlisle (two members)	John Christian Curwen	Whig
Carlow	Charles Harvey-Saville-Onley	Tory
County Carlow (two members)	Henry Bruen	Tory
County Carlow (two members)	Sir Ulysses Bagenal Burgh	Tory
Carmarthen	John Campbell, 1st Earl Cawdor	Tory
Carmarthenshire	George Rice-Trevor, 4th Baron Dynevor	Tory
Carrickfergus	Arthur Chichester	Tory
Cashel	Ebenezer John Collett	Tory
Castle Rising (two members)	Earl of Rocksavage	Tory
Castle Rising (two members)	Hon Fulk Greville Howard	Tory
County Cavan (two members)	Nathaniel Sneyd	Tory
County Cavan (two members)	John Maxwell-Barry	Tory
Cheshire (two members)	Davies Davenport	
Cheshire (two members)	Wilbraham Egerton	Tory
Chester (two members)	Viscount Belgrave	Tory
Chester (two members)	Thomas Grosvenor	
Chichester (two members)	William Huskisson	Tory
Chichester (two members)	Lord John Lennox	Whig
Chippenham (two members)	William Madocks	
Chippenham (two members)	John Rock Grossett	
Christchurch (two members)	William Sturges Bourne	Tory
Christchurch (two members)	George Henry Rose	Tory
Cirencester (two members)	Joseph Cripps	Tory
Cirencester (two members)	Henry Bathurst	Tory
Clackmannanshire	Robert Bruce	
County Clare (two members)	Sir Edward O'Brien, Bt	Whig
County Clare (two members)	William Vesey-FitzGerald	Tory
Clitheroe (two members)	Robert Curzon	Tory
Clitheroe (two members)	Hon. William Cust	Tory
Clonmel	James Hewitt Massy Dawson	Tory
Cockermouth (two members)	Sir John Beckett, Bt	Tory
Cockermouth (two members)	Sir John Lowther, Bt	Tory
Colchester (two members)	Daniel Whittle Harvey	Radical
Colchester (two members)	James Beckford Wildman	Tory
Coleraine	Sir John Beresford, Bt	Tory
Corfe Castle (two members)	George Bankes	Tory
Corfe Castle (two members)	Henry Bankes	Tory
Cork City (two members)	Hon. Christopher Hely-Hutchinson	Whig
Cork City (two members)	Sir Nicholas Colthurst, Bt	Tory
County Cork (two members)	Richard Hare, Viscount Ennismore	
County Cork (two members)	Edward King, Viscount Kingsborough	Whig
Cornwall (two members)	John Hearle Tremayne	Tory
Cornwall (two members)	William Lemon	Whig
Coventry (two members)	Edward Ellice	Whig
Coventry (two members)	Peter Moore	
Cricklade (two members)	Joseph Pitt	
Cricklade (two members)	Robert Gordon	Whig
Cromartyshire	No return - alternating constituency with Nairnshire	
Cumberland (two members)	Sir John Lowther, Bt	Tory
Cumberland (two members)	John Christian Curwen	Whig
== D ==
Constituency	MP	Party
Dartmouth (two members)	John Bastard	
Dartmouth (two members)	Charles Milner Ricketts	
Denbigh	John Wynne Griffith	Whig
Denbighshire	Sir Watkin Williams-Wynn, Bt	
Derby (two members)	Henry Frederick Compton Cavendish	Whig
Derby (two members)	Thomas William Coke	
Derbyshire (two members)	Edward Mundy	Tory
Derbyshire (two members)	Lord George Cavendish	Whig
Devizes (two members)	John Pearse	
Devizes (two members)	Thomas Grimston Estcourt	
Devon (two members)	Edmund Pollexfen Bastard	
Devon (two members)	Thomas Dyke Acland	Tory
Donegal	Earl of Mount Charles	Tory
Dorchester (two members)	Charles Warren	
Dorchester (two members)	Robert Williams	
Dorset (two members)	Edward Berkeley Portman	
Dorset (two members)	William Morton Pitt	
Dover (two members)	Edward Bootle-Wilbraham	
Dover (two members)	Joseph Butterworth	
Down (two members)	Lord Arthur Hill	Whig
Down (two members)	Robert Stewart, Viscount Castlereagh	Tory
Downpatrick	John Waring Maxwell	Tory
Downton (two members)	Bartholomew Bouverie	Whig
Downton (two members)	Thomas Brooke-Pechell	Tory
Drogheda	Henry Metcalfe	Tory
Droitwich (two members)	Earl of Sefton	Whig
Droitwich (two members)	Thomas Foley	Whig
Dublin (two members)	Rt Hon. Henry Grattan	Whig
Dublin (two members)	Sir Robert Shaw, Bt	Tory
County Dublin (two members)	Hans Hamilton	Tory
County Dublin (two members)	Richard Wogan Talbot	Whig
Dublin University	William Plunket	Whig
Dumfries Burghs	Lord William Robert Keith Douglas	
Dumfriesshire	John Hope-Johnstone	Tory
Dunbartonshire	Archibald Campbell-Colquhoun	
Dundalk	John Metge	Tory
Dungannon	Hon. Thomas Knox	
Dungarvan	Augustus William James Clifford	Whig
Dunwich (two members)	Michael Barne	
Dunwich (two members)	George Henry Cherry	
Durham City (two members)	Michael Angelo Taylor	Whig
Durham City (two members)	Sir Henry Hardinge	Tory
County Durham (two members)	John Lambton, 1st Earl of Durham	Radical
County Durham (two members)	Hon. William Powlett	Whig
Dysart Burghs	Sir Ronald Crauford Ferguson	Whig
== E ==
Constituency	MP	Party
East Grinstead (two members)	Charles Gordon	
East Grinstead (two members)	Hon Charles Jenkinson	
East Looe (two members)	George Watson-Taylor	Tory
East Looe (two members)	Thomas Potter Macqueen	Tory
East Retford (two members)	William Evans	
East Retford (two members)	Samuel Crompton	
Edinburgh	William Dundas	Tory
Edinburghshire	Sir George Clerk, Bt	
Elgin Burghs	Archibald Farquharson	
Elginshire	Francis William Grant	
Ennis	Sir Ross Mahon, Bt	Tory
Enniskillen	Richard Magenis	Tory
Essex (two members)	Charles Callis Western	
Essex (two members)	Sir Eliab Harvey	
Evesham (two members)	Sir Charles Cockerell, Bt	Whig
Evesham (two members)	William Rouse-Boughton	
Exeter (two members)	William Courtenay	
Exeter (two members)	Robert William Newman	
Eye (two members)	Sir Robert Gifford	Tory
Eye (two members)	Sir Miles Nightingall	Tory
== F ==
Constituency	MP	Party
Fermanagh (two members)	Sir Galbraith Lowry Cole	
Fermanagh (two members)	Mervyn Archdall	Tory
Fifeshire	James Erskine Wemyss	
Flint Boroughs	Sir Edward Pryce Lloyd, Bt	Whig
Flintshire	Sir Thomas Mostyn, Bt	
Forfar	Hon. William Maule	
Fowey (two members)	Ernest Edgcumbe	Tory
Fowey (two members)	George Lucy	Tory
== G ==
Constituency	MP	Party
Galway Borough	Michael George Prendergast	
County Galway (two members)	James Daly	Tory
County Galway (two members)	Richard Martin	Independent Conservative
Gatton (two members)	Jesse Watts-Russell	
Gatton (two members)	Thomas Divett	
Glamorgan	Sir Christopher Cole	
Glasgow Burghs	Archibald Campbell	Tory
Gloucester (two members)	Robert Bransby Cooper	Tory
Gloucester (two members)	Edward Webb	Whig
Gloucestershire (two members)	Edward Somerset	Tory
Gloucestershire (two members)	Berkeley Guise	Whig
Grampound (two members)	John Innes	
Grampound (two members)	Alexander Robertson	
Grantham (two members)	Edward Cust	
Grantham (two members)	James Hughes	
Great Bedwyn (two members)	John Nicholl	Tory
Great Bedwyn (two members)	John Buxton	Tory
Great Grimsby (two members)	Charles Tennyson	
Great Grimsby (two members)	William Duncombe	
Great Marlow (two members)	Thomas Peers Williams	Tory
Great Marlow (two members)	Owen Williams	Whig
Great Yarmouth (two members)	Thomas Anson	Whig
Great Yarmouth (two members)	Charles Edmund Rumbold	Whig
Guildford (two members)	Arthur Onslow	Tory
Guildford (two members)	Charles Baring Wall	Tory
== H ==
Constituency	MP	Party
Haddington Burghs	Sir Hew Dalrymple-Hamilton, Bt	
Haddingtonshire	Sir James Grant-Suttie, Bt	
Hampshire (two members)	John Willis Fleming	Tory
Hampshire (two members)	George Purefoy-Jervoise	
Harwich (two members)	Nicholas Vansittart	
Harwich (two members)	Charles Bathurst	
Haslemere (two members)	Charles Long	Tory
Haslemere (two members)	Robert Plumer Ward	Tory
Hastings (two members)	William Henry John Scott	
Hastings (two members)	James Dawkins	
Haverfordwest	William Henry Scourfield	
Hedon (two members)	John Baillie	Tory
Hedon (two members)	Robert Farrand	Whig
Helston (two members)	James Townshend	Tory
Helston (two members)	Harrington Hudson	
Hereford (two members)	Richard Philip Scudamore	
Hereford (two members)	Viscount Eastnor	
Herefordfordshire (two members)	Sir John Cotterell, Bt	Tory
Herefordfordshire (two members)	Sir Robert Price, Bt	Whig
Hertford (two members)	Nicolson Calvert	Whig
Hertford (two members)	Viscount Cranborne	Tory
Hertfordshire (two members)	Sir John Sebright, Bt	Whig
Hertfordshire (two members)	Hon.William Lamb	Whig
Heytesbury (two members)	Edward Henry A'Court	
Heytesbury (two members)	Charles Ashe A'Court	
Higham Ferrers	William Plumer	Whig
Hindon (two members)	John Plummer	Whig
Hindon (two members)	Frederick Gough-Calthorpe	Whig
Honiton (two members)	Peregrine Cust	
Honiton (two members)	Samuel Crawley	
Horsham (two members)	Robert Hurst	Whig
Horsham (two members)	Sir John Aubrey, Bt	
Huntingdon (two members)	Earl of Ancram	Tory
Huntingdon (two members)	John Calvert	
Huntingdonshire (two members)	William Henry Fellowes	
Huntingdonshire (two members)	Lord John Russell	Whig
Hythe (two members)	Samuel Jones-Loyd	Liberal
Hythe (two members)	Stewart Marjoribanks	
== I ==
Constituency	MP	Party
Ilchester (two members)	Isaac Coffin	Whig
Ilchester (two members)	Stephen Lushington	Whig
Inverness Burghs	George Cumming	Tory
Inverness-shire	Charles Grant	
Ipswich (two members)	William Haldimand	
Ipswich (two members)	Robert Alexander Crickitt	
== K ==
Constituency	MP	Party
Kent (two members)	Sir Edward Knatchbull, Bt	Tory
Kent (two members)	William Philip Honywood	Whig
Kerry (two members)	Maurice FitzGerald	Whig
Kerry (two members)	James Crosbie	
Kildare (two members)	Lord William FitzGerald	Whig
Kildare (two members)	Robert La Touche	Whig
Kilkenny City	Hon. Denis Browne	Tory
County Kilkenny (two members)	James Butler, 1st Marquess of Ormonde	
County Kilkenny (two members)	Hon. Frederick Ponsonby	
Kincardineshire	Sir Alexander Ramsay, Bt	
King's County (two members)	Thomas Bernard	
King's County (two members)	John Clere Parsons	
King's Lynn (two members)	Lord Walpole	
King's Lynn (two members)	Sir Martin Browne ffolkes	
Kingston upon Hull (two members)	John Mitchell	Tory
Kingston upon Hull (two members)	Daniel Sykes	Whig
Kinross-shire	no return - alternating constituency with Clackmannanshire	
Kinsale	George Coussmaker	
Kirkcudbright Stewartry	James Dunlop	
Knaresborough (two members)	George Tierney	Whig
Knaresborough (two members)	Sir James Mackintosh	Whig
== L ==
Constituency	MP	Party
Lanarkshire	Lord Archibald Hamilton	Whig
Lancashire (two members)	Lord Stanley	
Lancashire (two members)	John Wilson-Patten	Tory
Lancaster (two members)	John Fenton-Cawthorne	Tory
Lancaster (two members)	Gabriel Doveton	Whig
Launceston (two members)	Pownoll Pellew	Tory
Launceston (two members)	James Brogden	Tory
Leicester (two members)	John Mansfield	
Leicester (two members)	Thomas Pares	
Leicestershire (two members)	Lord Robert William Manners	
Leicestershire (two members)	George Anthony Legh-Keck	
Leitrim (two members)	Luke White	Liberal
Leitrim (two members)	John Marcus Clements	
Leominster (two members)	The Lord Hotham	
Leominster (two members)	Sir William Cuninghame-Fairlie, Bt	
Lewes (two members)	Sir George Shiffner	
Lewes (two members)	Sir John Shelley, Bt	
Lichfield (two members)	Sir George Anson	Whig
Lichfield (two members)	George Granville Venables Vernon	Whig
County Limerick (two members)	Richard FitzGibbon	Whig
County Limerick (two members)	Standish O'Grady	
Limerick City	Hon. John Prendergast Vereker	Tory
Lincoln (two members)	Robert Percy Smith	
Lincoln (two members)	Coningsby Waldo-Sibthorpe	
Lincolnshire (two members)	Charles Anderson-Pelham	
Lincolnshire (two members)	Charles Chaplin	
Linlithgow Burghs	Henry Monteith	Tory
Linlithgowshire	Alexander Hope	
Lisburn	Horace Seymour	Tory
Liskeard (two members)	William Eliot	Tory
Liskeard (two members)	William Pringle	Tory
Liverpool (two members)	George Canning	Tory
Liverpool (two members)	Isaac Gascoyne	Tory
London (four members)	Sir Matthew Wood, Bt	Whig
London (four members)	Thomas Wilson	Tory
London (four members)	Sir William Curtis, Bt	Tory
London (four members)	George Bridges	Tory
Londonderry (two members)	George Robert Dawson	
Londonderry (two members)	Alexander Robert Stewart	
Londonderry City	Sir Robert Ferguson, Bt	
Longford (two members)	George Forbes, Viscount Forbes	
Longford (two members)	Sir George Fetherston, Bt	
Lostwithiel (two members)	Robert Wigram	Tory
Lostwithiel (two members)	Alexander Cray Grant	Tory
County Louth (two members)	John Foster	
County Louth (two members)	Viscount Jocelyn	
Ludgershall (two members)	Henry Luttrell	Tory
Ludgershall (two members)	Sandford Graham	Whig
Ludlow (two members)	Hon Robert Clive	
Ludlow (two members)	Viscount Clive	Tory
Lyme Regis (two members)	Vere Fane	Tory
Lyme Regis (two members)	John Thomas Fane	Tory
Lymington (two members)	Harry Burrard-Neale, Bt	
Lymington (two members)	George Finch	
== M ==
Constituency	MP	Party
Maidstone (two members)	Abraham Wildey Robarts	Whig
Maidstone (two members)	John Wells	Tory
Maldon (two members)	Joseph Holden Strutt	Tory
Maldon (two members)	Benjamin Gaskell	Whig
Mallow	William Wrixon Becher	Whig
Malmesbury (two members)	Charles Forbes	Tory
Malmesbury (two members)	Kirkman Finlay	Tory
Malton (two members)	Viscount Duncannon	Whig
Malton (two members)	John Charles Ramsden	Whig
Marlborough (two members)	John Wodehouse	
Marlborough (two members)	James Brudenell	Tory
Mayo (two members)	Dominick Browne	
Mayo (two members)	James Browne	
Meath (two members)	Thomas Taylour	
Meath (two members)	Sir Marcus Somerville, Bt	
Merioneth	Sir Robert Williames Vaughan	Tory
Middlesex (two members)	George Byng	Whig
Middlesex (two members)	Samuel Charles Whitbread	Whig
Midhurst (two members)	Abel Smith	Tory
Midhurst (two members)	John Smith	Tory
Milborne Port (two members)	Berkeley Paget	Tory
Milborne Port (two members)	Thomas Graves	Tory
Minehead (two members)	John Fownes Luttrell	Tory
Minehead (two members)	Henry Fownes Luttrell	Tory
Mitchell (two members)	George Staunton	
Mitchell (two members)	William Taylor Money	
Monaghan (two members)	Charles Powell Leslie	
Monaghan (two members)	Henry Westenra	
Monmouth Boroughs	Marquess of Worcester	Tory
Monmouthshire	Sir Charles Gould Morgan	
Monmouthshire	Lord Granville Somerset	Tory
Montgomery	Henry Clive	
Montgomeryshire	Charles Williams-Wynn	Tory
Morpeth	William Ord	Whig
Morpeth	Hon. William Howard	
== N ==
Constituency	MP	Party
Nairnshire	George Pryse Campbell	Whig
New Romney (two members)	Richard Erle-Drax-Grosvenor	Whig
New Romney (two members)	George Hay Dawkins-Pennant	Tory
New Ross	John Carroll	
New Shoreham (two members)	James Martin Lloyd	
New Shoreham (two members)	Sir Charles Merrik Burrell, Bt	Tory
Newark (two members)	Sir William Henry Clinton	Tory
Newark (two members)	Henry Willoughby	Tory
Newcastle-under-Lyme	William Shepherd Kinnersley	
Newcastle-under-Lyme	Robert John Wilmot	Tory
Newcastle-upon-Tyne	Sir Matthew White Ridley, Bt	Whig
Newcastle-upon-Tyne	Cuthbert Ellison	Whig
Newport (Cornwall) (two members)	William Northey	Tory
Newport (Cornwall) (two members)	Jonathan Raine	Tory
Newport (Isle of Wight) (two members)	Charles Duncombe	
Newport (Isle of Wight) (two members)	Leonard Worsley-Holmes	
Newry	Hon Francis Needham	Tory
Newton (two members)	Thomas Legh	
Newton (two members)	Thomas Claughton	
Newtown (two members)	Hudson Gurney	Whig
Newtown (two members)	Dudley Long North	Whig
Norfolk (two members)	Thomas Coke	Whig
Norfolk (two members)	Edmond Wodehouse	Tory
Northallerton (two members)	Henry Peirse (younger)	Whig
Northallerton (two members)	William Saunders Lascelles	Whig
Northampton (two members)	Sir George Robinson, Bt	
Northampton (two members)	William Leader Maberly	Whig
Northamptonshire (two members)	William Ralph Cartwright	Tory
Northamptonshire (two members)	Viscount Althorp	Whig
Northumberland (two members)	Thomas Wentworth Beaumont	Tory
Northumberland (two members)	Charles John Brandling	Tory
Norwich (two members)	William Smith	Radicals
Norwich (two members)	Richard Hanbury Gurney	
Nottingham (two members)	Sir Joseph Birch, Bt	
Nottingham (two members)	Thomas Denman	
Nottinghamshire (two members)	Frank Sotheron	Tory
Nottinghamshire (two members)	Lord William Bentinck	Whig
== O ==
Constituency	MP	Party
Okehampton (two members)	Henry Prittie	Whig
Okehampton (two members)	Albany Savile	Tory
Old Sarum (two members)	James Alexander	Tory
Old Sarum (two members)	Arthur Johnston Crawford	Tory
Orford (two members)	Horace Seymour	Tory
Orford (two members)	John Douglas	Tory
Orkney and Shetland	John Balfour	
Oxford (two members)	Charles Wetherell	
Oxford (two members)	John Ingram Lockhart	
Oxford University (two members)	William Scott	Tory
Oxford University (two members)	Robert Peel	Tory
Oxfordshire (two members)	William Henry Ashhurst	Tory
Oxfordshire (two members)	John Fane	Tory
== P ==
Constituency	MP	Party
Peeblesshire	Sir James Montgomery, 2nd Bt	
Pembroke	John Hensleigh Allen	Whig
Pembrokeshire	Sir John Owen, Bt	Tory
Penryn (two members)	Henry Swann	Tory
Penryn (two members)	Pascoe Grenfell	Whig
Perth Burghs	Hon. Hugh Lindsay	
Perthshire	James Drummond	Tory
Peterborough (two members)	Sir James Scarlett	Whig
Peterborough (two members)	Sir Robert Heron, Bt	Whig
Petersfield (two members)	Hylton Jolliffe	
Petersfield (two members)	Beaumont Hotham	
Plymouth (two members)	William Congreve	
Plymouth (two members)	Thomas Byam Martin	
Plympton Erle (two members)	Ranald George Macdonald	
Plympton Erle (two members)	Alexander Boswell	Tory
Pontefract (two members)	Thomas Houldsworth	
Pontefract (two members)	Viscount Pollington	
Poole (two members)	John Dent	
Poole (two members)	Benjamin Lester Lester	Whig
Portarlington	David Ricardo	Whig
Portsmouth (two members)	John Markham	Whig
Portsmouth (two members)	John Bonham-Carter	Whig
Preston (two members)	Edmund Hornby	Whig
Preston (two members)	Samuel Horrocks	Tory
== Q ==
Constituency	MP	Party
Queen's County	Hon. William Wellesley-Pole	Tory
Queenborough (two members)	Hon. John Villiers	Tory
Queenborough (two members)	George Peter Holford	Tory
== R ==
Constituency	MP	Party
Radnor	Richard Price	Tory
Radnorshire	Walter Wilkins	Whig
Reading (two members)	John Berkeley Monck	
Reading (two members)	Charles Fyshe Palmer	
Reigate (two members)	Sir Joseph Sydney Yorke	Tory
Reigate (two members)	Hon. James Somers Cocks	
Renfrewshire	John Maxwell	
Richmond (two members)	Thomas Dundas	Whig
Richmond (two members)	Samuel Barrett Moulton Barrett	Whig
Ripon (two members)	Hon. Frederick John Robinson	Tory
Ripon (two members)	George Gipps	Tory
Rochester (two members)	Lord Binning	Tory
Rochester (two members)	Ralph Bernal	Whig
Roscommon (two members)	Arthur French	
Roscommon (two members)	Hon. Stephen Mahon	
Ross-shire	Thomas Mackenzie	
Roxburghshire	Sir Alexander Don, Bt	
Rutland (two members)	Sir Gerard Noel, Bt	Tory
Rutland (two members)	Sir Gilbert Heathcote, Bt	Whig
Rye (two members)	Peter Browne	
Rye (two members)	John Dodson	
== S ==
Constituency	MP	Party
Salisbury (two members)	William Pleydell-Bouverie	
Salisbury (two members)	Wadham Wyndham	Tory
Saltash (two members)	Matthew Russell	
Saltash (two members)	Michael George Prendergast	
Sandwich (two members)	Joseph Marryat	
Sandwich (two members)	Sir George Warrender, Bt	
Scarborough (two members)	Charles Manners-Sutton	Tory
Scarborough (two members)	Viscount Normanby	Whig
Seaford (two members)	Charles Rose Ellis	Tory
Seaford (two members)	George Welbore Agar-Ellis	Whig
Selkirkshire	William Eliott-Lockhart	
Shaftesbury (two members)	Edward Harbord	
Shaftesbury (two members)	Abraham Moore	
Shrewsbury (two members)	Henry Grey Bennet	Whig
Shrewsbury (two members)	Panton Corbett	Tory
Shropshire (two members)	Sir John Kynaston Powell, Bt	
Shropshire (two members)	John Cotes	
County Sligo (two members)	Charles O'Hara	Tory
County Sligo (two members)	Edward Synge Cooper	Tory
Sligo	Owen Wynne	Tory
Somerset (two members)	Sir Thomas Lethbridge, Bt	Tory
Somerset (two members)	William Dickinson	Tory
Southampton (two members)	William Chamberlayne	
Southampton (two members)	William Champion de Crespigny	
Southwark (two members)	Charles Calvert	Whig
Southwark (two members)	Sir Robert Wilson	Whig
St Albans (two members)	Christopher Smith	Tory
St Albans (two members)	William Tierney Robarts	Whig
St Germans (two members)	Seymour Thomas Bathurst	Tory
St Germans (two members)	Charles Arbuthnot	Tory
St Ives (two members)	Lyndon Evelyn	Tory
St Ives (two members)	James Graham	Whig
St Mawes (two members)	Scrope Bernard-Morland	Tory
St Mawes (two members)	Joseph Phillimore	Tory
Stafford (two members)	Sir George Chetwynd, Bt	Whig
Stafford (two members)	Benjamin Benyon	Whig
Staffordshire (two members)	Edward Littleton	Canningite Tory
Staffordshire (two members)	Sir John Boughey, Bt	Whig
Stamford (two members)	Lord Thomas Cecil	Tory
Stamford (two members)	Hon. William Henry Percy	Tory
Steyning (two members)	Lord Henry Howard-Molyneux-Howard	Whig
Steyning (two members)	Sir George Philips, Bt	Whig|
Stirling Burghs	Robert Downie	
Stirlingshire	Sir Charles Edmonstone, Bt	
Stockbridge (two members)	Joseph Foster Barham	Whig
Stockbridge (two members)	John Foster Barham	Whig
Sudbury (two members)	Sir William Heygate, Bt	
Sudbury (two members)	Charles Augustus Tulk	
Suffolk (two members)	Sir Thomas Gooch, Bt	
Suffolk (two members)	Sir William Rowley, Bt	
Surrey (two members)	George Holme Sumner	Tory
Surrey (two members)	William Joseph Denison	Whig
Sussex (two members)	Walter Burrell	Tory
Sussex (two members)	Edward Jeremiah Curteis	
Sutherland	George Macpherson Grant	
== T ==
Constituency	MP	Party
Tain Burghs	Sir Hugh Innes, Bt	Tory
Tamworth (two members)	Lord Charles Townshend	
Tamworth (two members)	William Yates Peel	
Taunton (two members)	Alexander Baring	
Taunton (two members)	John Ashley Warre	
Tavistock (two members)	John Peter Grant	Whig
Tavistock (two members)	John Nicholas Fazakerly	Whig
Tewkesbury (two members)	John Edmund Dowdeswell	Tory
Tewkesbury (two members)	John Martin	Whig
Thetford (two members)	Nicholas Ridley-Colborne	
Thetford (two members)	Lord Charles FitzRoy	
Thirsk (two members)	Sir Robert Frankland-Russell, Bt	Whig
Thirsk (two members)	Robert Greenhill-Russell	Whig
Tipperary (two members)	William Bagwell	Tory
Tipperary (two members)	Francis Aldborough Prittie	Whig
Tiverton (two members)	Dudley Ryder	Tory
Tiverton (two members)	Richard Ryder	Tory
Totnes (two members)	John Bent	
Totnes (two members)	Thomas Courtenay	
Tralee	James Cuffe	
Tregony (two members)	Henry Vane	Whig
Tregony (two members)	James O'Callaghan	Whig
Truro (two members)	Hussey Vivian	Whig
Truro (two members)	William Gossett	Whig
Tyrone (two members)	Sir John Stewart, Bt	Tory
Tyrone (two members)	William Stewart	Whig
== W ==
Constituency	MP	Party
Wallingford (two members)	William Hughes	Whig
Wallingford (two members)	George James Robarts	Whig
Wareham (two members)	John Calcraft	Whig
Wareham (two members)	John Hales Calcraft	Tory
Warwick (two members)	Hon. Sir Charles Greville	Tory
Warwick (two members)	Charles Mills	
Warwickshire (two members)	Dugdale Stratford Dugdale	
Warwickshire (two members)	Sir Charles Mordaunt, Bt	
Waterford City	Sir John Newport, Bt	Whig
County Waterford (two members)	Richard Shapland Power	Whig/Catholic Association
County Waterford (two members)	Lord George Beresford	Tory
Wells (two members)	Charles Taylor	Whig
Wells (two members)	John Paine Tudway	Tory
Wendover (two members)	Samuel Smith	Tory
Wendover (two members)	George Smith	Whig
Wenlock (two members)	Francis Forester	
Wenlock (two members)	William Lacon Childe	
Weobley (two members)	Lord Frederick Cavendish-Bentinck	
Weobley (two members)	Sir George Cockburn, Bt	Tory
West Looe (two members)	Charles Hulse	Tory
West Looe (two members)	Henry Goulburn	Tory
Westbury (two members)	Jonathan Elford	Tory
Westbury (two members)	Nathaniel Barton	Tory
Westmeath (two members)	Hon. Hercules Robert Pakenham	Tory
Westmeath (two members)	Gustavus Hume Rochfort	Tory
Westminster (two members)	Sir Francis Burdett, Bt	
Westminster (two members)	John Cam Hobhouse	
Westmorland (two members)	Viscount Lowther	Tory
Westmorland (two members)	Henry Cecil Lowther	Tory
Wexford	William Wigram	Tory
County Wexford (two members)	Robert Shapland Carew	Whig
County Wexford (two members)	James Thomas Stopford	
Weymouth and Melcombe Regis (four members)	William Williams	Whig
Weymouth and Melcombe Regis (four members)	Thomas Buxton	Whig
Weymouth and Melcombe Regis (four members)	Thomas Wallace	Tory
Weymouth and Melcombe Regis (four members)	Masterton Ure	Tory
Whitchurch (two members)	Samuel Scott	Tory
Whitchurch (two members)	Horatio George Powys Townshend	Tory
Wicklow (two members)	Hon. Granville Proby	Whig
Wicklow (two members)	William Parnell-Hayes	
Wigan (two members)	James Alexander Hodson	Tory
Wigan (two members)	James Lindsay, Lord Lindsay	Tory
Wigtown Burghs	Hon. James Henry Keith Stewart	Tory
Wigtownshire	James Hunter-Blair	
Wilton (two members)	Ralph Sheldon	
Wilton (two members)	James Harris	
Wiltshire (two members)	John Benett	
Wiltshire (two members)	John Dugdale Astley	
Winchelsea (two members)	Henry Brougham	Whig
Winchelsea (two members)	Lucius Concannon	Whig
Winchester (two members)	James Henry Leigh	
Winchester (two members)	Paulet St John-Mildmay	
Windsor (two members)	Herbert Taylor	Tory
Windsor (two members)	John Ramsbottom	Whig
Woodstock (two members)	John Gladstone	Tory
Woodstock (two members)	James Haughton Langston	
Wootton Bassett (two members)	Horace Twiss	Tory
Wootton Bassett (two members)	George Philips	Whig
Worcester (two members)	Viscount Deerhurst	Tory
Worcester (two members)	Thomas Henry Hastings Davies	Whig
Worcestershire (two members)	Hon. Henry Lygon	
Worcestershire (two members)	Sir Thomas Winnington, Bt	
Wycombe (two members)	Thomas Baring	
Wycombe (two members)	John Dashwood-King	Tory
== Y ==
Constituency	MP	Party
Yarmouth (Isle of Wight) (two members)	Peter Pole	Tory
Yarmouth (Isle of Wight) (two members)	Theodore Henry Broadhead	Tory
York (two members)	Lawrence Dundas	Whig
York (two members)	Marmaduke Wyvill	Whig
Yorkshire (two members)	Viscount Milton	Whig
Yorkshire (two members)	James Stuart-Wortley	Tory
Youghal	John Hyde	

== Changes ==
=== Results overturned on petition ===
Date	Constituency	Removed MP		Instated MP	
4 June 1820	Ipswich	Robert Alexander Crickitt		Thomas Barrett-Lennard	
7 June 1820	Boroughbridge	Richard Spooner	Radical	Captain George Mundy, RN	Tory
7 June 1820	Boroughbridge	Marmaduke Lawson	Whig	Henry Dawkins	Tory
12 June 1820	Callington	Sir Christopher Robinson	Tory	William Thompson	Whig
12 June 1820	Callington	Hon. Edward Pyndar Lygon	Tory	Matthias Attwood	Whig
20 June 1820	Bridport	Christopher Spurrier		Horace St Paul	
3 July 1820	Limerick City	Hon. John Prendergast Vereker	Tory	Thomas Spring Rice	Whig
16 Feb 1821	Boston	Henry Ellis		William Augustus Johnson	

=== By-elections ===
Date	Constituency	Outgoing MP		Incoming MP		Cause
22 May 1820	Tavistock	John Nicholas Fazakerly	Whig	Hugh Fortescue	Whig	Fazakerly resigned by taking the Chiltern Hundreds
23 May 1820	Appleby	George Tierney	Whig	Thomas Creevey	Whig	Tierney chose to sit for Knaresborough
30 May 1820	Scarborough	Viscount Normanby	Whig	Edmund Phipps	Tory	Viscount Normanby vacated seat
23 May 1820	Orford	Horace Seymour	Tory	Edmund Alexander Macnaghten	Tory	Seymour chose to sit for Lisburn
31 May 1820	Carlisle	John Christian Curwen	Whig	William James	Whig	Curwen sat for Cumberland
2 June 1820	Athlone	John McClintock	Tory	David Ker	Tory	McClintock vacated seat
14 June 1820	Saltash	Michael George Prendergast		John Fleming		Prendergast chose to sit for Galway Borough instead
16 June 1820	Okehampton	Albany Savile	Tory	John Campbell	Whig	Savile vacated his seat
27 June 1820	Malmesbury	Kirkman Finlay	Tory	William Leake		Finlay resigned amid campaigns against his rectorship of the University of Glasgow
27 June 1820	Petersfield	Beaumont Hotham		Philip Musgrave		Hotham chose to sit for Leominster instead
28 June 1820	York	Lawrence Dundas	Whig	Robert Chaloner	Whig	Dundas ennobled
29 June 1820	Dundalk	John Metge	Tory	George Hartopp	Tory	Metge resigned seat, (appointed Escheator of Munster)
29 June 1820	Ennis	Sir Ross Mahon, Bt	Tory	Richard Wellesley	Tory	Mahon resigned seat
30 June 1820	Dublin	Rt Hon. Henry Grattan	Whig	Thomas Ellis	Tory	Grattan died 4 June 1820
13 July 1820	Berwick-upon-Tweed	Sir David Milne		Henry Heneage St Paul		Milne's election declared void
14 July 1820	Colchester	Daniel Whittle Harvey	Radical	Henry Baring	Tory	Harvey's election declared void
17 July 1820	Old Sarum	Arthur Johnston Crawford	Tory	Josias Alexander	Tory	Crawford vacated seat
21 July 1820	Grantham	James Hughes		Sir Montague Cholmeley, Bt		Hughes election declared void
11 September 1820	County Kilkenny	James Butler, 1st Marquess of Ormonde		Charles Harwood Butler Clarke		Butler made Irish peer
3 August 1820	Heytesbury	Charles Ashe A'Court		Henry Handley		A'Court resigned
10 August 1820	County Louth	Viscount Jocelyn		John Jocelyn		Robert Jocelyn made Irish peer
17 October 1820	Aberdeenshire	James Ferguson	Tory	Hon. William Gordon	Tory	James Ferguson died
7 November 1820	Warwickshire	Sir Charles Mordaunt, Bt		Francis Lawley	Whig	Mordaunt vacated his seat
29 November 1820	Westbury	Jonathan Elford	Tory	Manasseh Masseh Lopes	Tory	Elford and Barton both resigned under pressure from Lopes, who controlled the pocket borough
29 November 1820	Westbury	Nathaniel Barton	Tory	Philip John Miles	Tory	Elford and Barton both resigned under pressure from Lopes, who controlled the pocket borough
7 December 1820	Berwick-upon-Tweed	Henry Heneage St Paul		Sir Francis Blake		St Paul died
9 January 1821	St Albans	William Tierney Robarts	Whig	Sir Henry Wright-Wilson	Tory	Robarts died 9 December 1920
16 Jan 1821	Roscommon	Arthur French I		Arthur French II		Arthur French I died 24 November 1820
17 January 1821	Yarmouth	Theodore Henry Broadhead	Tory	Theodore Broadhead	Tory	Theodore Henry Broadhead died
1 February 1821	Wilton	James Harris		John Hungerford Penruddocke	Tory	Harris succeeded to the peerage as Earl of Malmesbury
9 February 1821	Newtown	Dudley Long North	Whig	Charles Compton Cavendish	Whig	North resigned
9 February 1821	Wicklow	William Parnell-Hayes		James Grattan	Liberal Party	Parnell-Hayes died 2 January 1821
17 February 1821	Plympton Erle	Alexander Boswell	Tory	William Gill Paxton		Boswell resigned due to a personal financial crisis
19 February 1821	Dunbartonshire	Archibald Campbell-Colquhoun		John Buchanan		Campbell-Colquhoun died 8 December 1820
9 March 1821	New Ross	John Carroll		Francis Leigh	Tory	Carroll resigned seat
21 March 1821	Wigtown Burghs	Hon. James Henry Keith Stewart	Tory	Sir John Osborn, Bt	Tory	Stewart vacated seat
28 April 1821	Orford	John Douglas	Tory	Marquess of Londonderry	Tory	Douglas vacated seat
5 May 1821	Ludgershall	Henry Luttrell	Tory	George Pratt	Tory	Luttrell died on 25 April 1821
9 May 1821	Down	Robert Stewart, Viscount Castlereagh	Tory	Mathew Forde	Tory	Castlereagh made Irish peer
11 May 1821	Andover	Thomas Assheton Smith I	Tory	Thomas Assheton Smith II	Tory	Smith I resigned to become Lord Lieutenant of Caernarvonshire
26 May 1821	St Ives	James Graham	Whig	Christopher Hawkins	Tory	Graham resigned after accusations of bribing the electorate
24 May 1821	Stirlingshire	Sir Charles Edmonstone, Bt		Henry Home-Drummond		Edmonstone died 1 April 1821
5 June 1821	Lymington	George Finch		William Manning		Finch resigned after the early death of his wife, Jane
3 July 1821	Kinsale	George Coussmaker		Sir Josias Rowley, Bt	Tory	Coussmaker died 23 May 1821
30 July 1821	King's County	John Clere Parsons		William Parsons, 3rd Earl of Rosse		John Clere Parsons made judge
24 August 1821	Oxford University	William Scott	Tory	Richard Heber	Tory	Scott was elevated to the peerage as Baron Stowell
27 August 1821	Queen's County	Hon. William Wellesley-Pole	Tory	Sir Charles Coote, Bt	Tory	Wellesley-Pole called to Upper House
12 September 1821	Shaftesbury	Edward Harbord		Ralph Leycester		Harbord succeeded to the peerage as Baron Suffield
27 September 1821	County Louth	John Foster		Thomas Skeffington		Foster called to Upper House
18 October 1821	Shropshire	John Cotes		Rowland Hill, 2nd Viscount Hill		Cotes died 24 August 1821
9 January 1822	King's Lynn	Sir Martin Browne ffolkes		Marquess of Titchfield		ffolkes died 11 December 1821
12 January 1822	County Antrim	Hugh Henry John Seymour	Tory	Viscount Beauchamp		Seymour died 2 December 1821
1 February 1822	Castle Rising	Earl of Rocksavage	Tory	Lord William Cholmondeley	Tory	Rocksavage elevated to peerage
11 February 1822	Higham Ferrers	William Plumer	Whig	Viscount Normanby	Whig	Plumer died 17 January 1822
14 February 1822	Droitwich	Thomas Foley	Whig	John Hodgetts Hodgetts-Foley	Whig	Foley died 11 January 1822
18 February 1822	Bletchingley	Marquess of Titchfield	Whig	Lord Francis Leveson-Gower	Tory	Titchfield resigned seat
18 February 1822	Dungarvan	Augustus William James Clifford	Whig	Hon. George Lamb	Whig	Clifford resigned seat
9 March 1822	Drogheda	Henry Metcalfe	Tory	William Meade Smyth	Tory	Metcalfe died 11 February 1822
14 March 1822	Argyllshire	Lord John Campbell	Whig	Walter Frederick Campbell	Whig	Campbell resigned seat
23 March 1822	Lincoln	Coningsby Waldo-Sibthorpe		John Williams		Waldo-Sibthorpe died
8 April 1822	Dartmouth	Charles Milner Ricketts		James Hamilton Stanhope		Ricketts resigned seat
12 April 1822	Minehead	Henry Fownes Luttrell	Tory	John Douglas	Tory	Luttrell resigned to become a Commissioner of the Board of Audit
30 April 1822	Shaftesbury	Abraham Moore		Robert Grosvenor	Whig	Moore resigned
22 May 1822	Saltash	Matthew Russell		William Russell	Whig	Matthew Russell died
26 June 1822	Camelford	Francis Seymour-Conway	Tory	Sheldon Cradock	Whig	Seymour-Conway succeeded to the peerage as Marquess of Hertford
30 July 1822	Stockbridge	Joseph Foster Barham	Whig	Edward Stanley	Whig	Barham resigned after selling control of the seat
30 July 1822	Wigtownshire	James Hunter-Blair		Sir William Maxwell, Bt	Tory	Hunter-Blair died 24 June 1822
14 August 1822	Clitheroe	Hon. William Cust	Tory	Henry Porcher	Tory	Cust resigned seat
1 October 1822	Orford	Marquess of Londonderry	Tory	Charles Ross	Tory	Marquess of Londonderry died 12 August 1822
25 November 1822	Derbyshire	Edward Mundy	Tory	Francis Mundy	Tory	Edward Mundy died, 18 October 1822
27 November 1822	Cambridge University	John Henry Smyth	Whig	William John Bankes	Tory	Smyth died October 1822
2 December 1822	Shropshire	Sir John Kynaston Powell, Bt		John Cressett-Pelham		Kynaston Powell died 24 October 1822
4 December 1822	County Sligo	Charles O'Hara	Tory	Henry King	Tory	O'Hara died 19 September 1822
20 December 1822	Ross-shire	Thomas Mackenzie		Sir James Mackenzie, Bt	Tory	Mackenzie died 19 October 20
6 January 1823	Wilton	Ralph Sheldon		Edward Baker		Sheldon died
10 February 1823	Harwich	Nicholas Vansittart		George Canning	Tory	Vansittart resigned seat
10 February 1823	Harwich	Charles Bathurst		John Charles Herries		Bathurst resigned seat
11 February 1823	Windsor	Herbert Taylor	Tory	Edward Cromwell Disbrowe		Taylor resigned to become colonel for life of the 85th Foot Regiment
11 February 1823	County Dublin	Hans Hamilton	Tory	Henry White	Tory	Hamilton died 22 December 1822
12 February 1823	Peterborough	Sir James Scarlett	Whig	Sir James Scarlett	Whig	Scarlett re-elected after resigning
15 February 1823	Liverpool	George Canning	Tory	William Huskisson	Tory	Canning appointed to Crown office
17 February 1823	Berwick-upon-Tweed	Charles Bennet		Sir John Beresford, Bt		Charles Bennet ennobled
18 February 1823	Chichester	William Huskisson	Tory	William Stephen Poyntz		Huskisson appointed to Crown office
18 February 1823	Winchester	James Henry Leigh		Edward East		Leigh resigned
20 February 1823	Winchelsea	Lucius Concannon	Whig	William Leader	Whig	Concannon died 29 January 1823
21 February 1823	Arundel	Robert Blake		Thomas Read Kemp		Robert Blake died
22 February 1823	Coleraine	Sir John Beresford, Bt	Tory	Sir John William Head Brydges	Tory	Beresford resigned seat
26 February 1823	Dorset	Edward Berkeley Portman		Edward Portman	Whig	Edward Berkeley Portman died
28 February 1823	Reigate	James Somers Cocks		James Cocks		James Somers Cocks resigned seat
4 March 1823	Rye	John Dodson		Robert Knight		Dodson vacated seat
8 March 1823	Fermanagh	Sir Galbraith Lowry Cole		Viscount Corry	Tory	Cole appointed to Crown office
18 March 1823	Corfe Castle	George Bankes	Tory	John Bond	Tory	Bankes resigned
3 April 1823	Lymington	Harry Burrard-Neale		Walter Boyd		Burrard-Neale resigned to become Commander-in-Chief of the Mediterranean Fleet
15 April 1823	Haslemere	Robert Plumer Ward	Tory	George Lowther Thompson	Tory	Ward appointed to Crown office
2 June 1823	Bossiney	John Ward	Tory	John Stuart-Wortley-Mackenzie	Tory	Ward succeeded to the peerage as Viscount Dudley and Ward
27 June 1823	Hertford	Viscount Cranborne	Tory	Thomas Byron		Viscount Cranborne succeeded as 2nd Marquess of Salisbury
24 July 1823	Newcastle-under-Lyme	William Shepherd Kinnersley		Evelyn Denison	Kinnersley died 8 July 1923	
6 December 1823	Lincolnshire	Charles Anderson-Pelham		William Amcotts-Ingilby		Anderson-Pelham called to Upper House
10 February 1824	Sandwich	Joseph Marryat		Henry Bonham		Marryat died 12 January 1824
16 January 1824	Liskeard	William Eliot	Tory	Lord Eliot	Tory	William Eliot called to Upper House
16 February 1824	Weobley	Lord Frederick Cavendish-Bentinck		Lord Henry Frederick Thynne	Tory	Cavendish-Bentinck vacated seat
21 February 1824	County Louth	Thomas Skeffington		John Leslie Foster		Skeffington became Irish peer
24 February 1824	County Cavan	John Maxwell-Barry	Tory	Henry Maxwell, 7th Baron Farnham	Tory	Barry succeeded to Irish peerage
1 March 1824	Portarlington	David Ricardo	Whig	James Farquhar	Tory	Ricardo died 11 September 1823
4 March 1824	Wigtown Burghs	Sir John Osborn, Bt	Tory	Nicholas Conyngham Tindal	Tory	Osborn appointed to Crown office
5 March 1824	New Ross	Francis Leigh	Tory	John Doherty	Tory	Leigh resigned seat
5 March 1824	Westmeath	Gustavus Hume Rochfort	Tory	Robert Smyth	Whig	Rochfort died 30 January 1824
8 March 1824	Barnstaple	Michael Nolan		Frederick Hodgson		Nolan resigned to become Chief Justice of the Brecon Circuit
8 March 1824	Oxfordshire	John Fane (b. 1751)	Tory	John Fane (b. 1775)	Tory	Fane (b. 1751) died on 8 February 1824
11 March 1824	Plympton Erle	Ranald George Macdonald		John Henry North	Tory	Macdonald resigned to fight a succession action in the Court of Session
22 March 1824	Queenborough	Hon. John Villiers	Tory	Lord Frederick Bentinck	Whig	Villiers called to Upper House
5 April 1824	Leitrim	Luke White		Samuel White		Luke White died 25 February 1824
20 April 1824	Lancaster	Gabriel Doveton	Whig	Thomas Greene	Tory	Doveton died 9 April 1824
5 May 1824	Dundalk	George Hartopp	Tory	Sir Robert Inglis, Bt	Tory	Hartopp died 31 March 1824
10 May 1824	Penryn	Henry Swann	Tory	Robert Stanton	Tory	Swann died on 24 April 1824
14 May 1824	Huntingdon	Earl of Ancram	Tory	James Stuart		Ancram called to Upper House
28 May 1824	Northallerton	Henry Peirse (younger)	Whig	Marcus Beresford	Whig	Pierse died 14 May 1824
2 June 1824	Okehampton	Henry Prittie	Whig	William Henry Trant	Tory	Prittie resigned seat
30 June 1834	Steyning	Lord Henry Howard-Molyneux-Howard	Whig	Henry Howard	Whig	Howard-Molyneux-Howard died 18 June 1824
13 July 1824	Clackmannanshire	Robert Bruce		George Ralph Abercrombie		Bruce resigned seat
27 January 1825	Cornwall	William Lemon	Whig	Richard Vyvyan	Tory	Lemon died on 11 December 1824
4 February 1825	Cambridge	Charles Madryll Cheere	Tory	Marquess of Graham	Tory	Cheere died 10 January 1825.
18 February 1825	Newport (Isle of Wight)	Leonard Worsley-Holmes		John Stuart		Worsley-Holmes died 10 January 1825
21 February 1825	Donegal	Earl of Mount Charles	Tory	Francis Conyngham		Henry Conyngham died 26 December 1824
28 February 1825	Brackley	Henry Wrottesley	Tory	James Bradshaw	Tory	Wrottesley died 17 February 1825
8 March 1825	Bramber	William Wilberforce	Independent	Arthur Gough-Calthorpe		Wilberforce resigned seat
25 March 1825	Dartmouth	James Hamilton Stanhope		John Hutton Cooper		Stanhope committed suicide on 5 March 1825
30 March 1825	Berkshire	Richard Griffin	Whig	Robert Palmer	Tory	Neville succeeded to the peerage as Baron Braybrooke and in 1825 changed name to Griffin.
2 April 1825	Carlisle	Sir James Graham, Bt	Tory	Sir Philip Musgrave, Bt	Tory	Graham died 21 March 1825
2 April 1825	Petersfield	Philip Musgrave		James Law Lushington		Musgrave resigned to contest the Carlisle by-election
6 April 1825	Wigan	James Lindsay, Lord Lindsay	Tory	James Lindsay	Tory	Lord Linsay vacated seat
6 May 1825	Bere Alston	Henry Percy		Percy Ashburnham		Percy died
27 June 1825	Tyrone	Sir John Stewart, Bt	Tory	Hon. Henry Lowry-Corry	Tory	Sir John Stewart died 1 June 1825
8 February 1826	Newport (Cornwall)	William Northey	Tory	Lord Charles Greatheed Bertie Percy	Tory	Northey died 19 January 1926
9 February 1826	Exeter	William Courtenay		Samuel Trehawke Kekewich		Courtenay resigned to become Clerk Assistant of the Parliaments
10 February 1826	Banbury	Heneage Legge		Arthur Legge		Heneage Legge appointed to Crown office
11 February 1826	Warwick	Charles Mills		John Tomes		Milles died 29 Jan 1826
18 February 1826	Corfe Castle	Henry Bankes	Tory	George Bankes	Tory	Henry Bankes resigned seat
21 February 1826	Northumberland	Charles John Brandling		Matthew Bell		Brandling died 1 February 1926
22 February 1826	Oxford University	Richard Heber	Tory	Thomas Grimston Estcourt	Tory	Heber vacated seat
1 March 1826	Devizes	Thomas Grimston Estcourt		George Watson-Taylor		Estcourt resigned seat
3 March 1826	East Looe	George Watson-Taylor	Tory	Henry Perceval	Tory	Watson-Taylor resigned to stand in the Devizes by-election
6 April 1826	Mitchell	William Taylor Money		Henry Labouchere	Whig	Money resigned to become Consul General at Venice
6 April 1826	County Carlow	Sir Ulysses Bagenal Burgh	Tory	Thomas Kavanagh	Tory	Burgh succeeded to Irish peerage
8 May 1826	Roxburghshire	Sir Alexander Don, Bt		Henry Hepburne-Scott		Don died 11 April 1823
17 Mar 1826	Horsham	Sir John Aubrey, Bt		Henry Edward Fox	Whig	Aubrey died 14 March 1826

== See also ==
- 1820 United Kingdom general election
- List of United Kingdom by-elections (1818–1832)
- List of parliaments of the United Kingdom
