= List of United Kingdom by-elections (1818–1832) =

This is a list of parliamentary by-elections in the United Kingdom held between 1818 and 1832, with the names of the previous incumbent and the victor in the by-election.

In the absence of a comprehensive and reliable source, for party and factional alignments in this period, no attempt is made to define them in this article. The House of Commons: 1790–1820 and The House of Commons: 1820–1832 provide some guidance to the complex and shifting political relationships, but those works do not define each member's allegiances.

== Resignations ==
See Resignation from the British House of Commons for more details.

Where the cause of by-election is given as "resignation", this indicates that the incumbent was appointed on his own request to an "office of profit under the Crown". Offices used, in this period, were the Stewards of the Chiltern Hundreds or the Manor of East Hendred and the Escheators of Munster or Ulster. These appointments are made as a constitutional device for leaving the House of Commons, whose Members are not permitted to resign. If the vacancy was caused by appointment to another office then this office is noted in brackets.

== By-elections ==
The c/u column denotes whether the by-election was a contested poll or an unopposed return. If the winner was re-elected, at the next general election and any intermediate by-elections, this is indicated by an * following the c or u. In a few cases the winner was elected at the next general election but had not been re-elected in a by-election after the one noted. In those cases no * symbol is used.

=== 6th Parliament (1818–1820) ===
Date	Constituency	c/u	Former incumbent	Winner	Cause
10 February 1819	Guildford	u	William Draper Best	Charles Baring Wall	Resignation (Puisne Justice of the King's Bench)
10 February 1819	Peterborough	u*	William Elliot	James Scarlett	Death
11 February 1819	Great Yarmouth	u*	Thomas William Anson	George Anson	Elevation to the peerage
12 February 1819	Ashburton	u*	John Singleton Copley	John Singleton Copley	Chief Justice of Chester
13 February 1819	Bletchingley	u	Matthew Russell	Sir William Curtis	Chose to sit for Saltash
16 February 1819	Droitwich	u*	Andrew Foley	Thomas Foley	Death
16 February 1819	New Windsor	u	Edward Disbrowe	The Lord Graves	Death
20 February 1819	Downton	u*	Viscount Folkestone	Bartholomew Bouverie	Chose to sit for Salisbury
20 February 1819	Dunwich	u	The Lord Huntingfield	William Alexander Mackinnon	Resignation
20 February 1819	Portarlington	u*	Richard Sharp	David Ricardo	Resignation
22 February 1819	Downton	u*	Sir William Scott	Sir Thomas Brooke Pechell	Chose to sit for Oxford University
22 February 1819	Lisburn	u	John Leslie Foster	Horace Seymour	Chose to sit for Armagh City
22 February 1819	New Romney	u*	Richard Erle-Drax-Grosvenor (father)	Richard Erle-Drax-Grosvenor (son)	Death
26 February 1819	Rye	u	Charles Arbuthnot	Thomas Phillipps Lamb	Chose to sit for St. Germans
27 February 1819	Bletchingley	u*	George Tennyson	Marquess of Titchfield	Resignation
1 March 1819	Wexford	u	Richard Nevill	Henry Evans	Resignation
2 March 1819	County Tipperary	u*	Viscount Caher	William Bagwell	Became an Irish Peer
3 March 1819	Westminster	u	Sir Samuel Romilly	George Lamb	Death
4 March 1819	Cashel	u*	Richard Pennefather	Ebenezer John Collett	Resignation
6 March 1819	Clonmel	u	William Bagwell	John Kiely	Resignation to contest Tipperary
6 March 1819	Newry	u*	Francis Needham	Francis Jack Needham	Became an Irish peer
15 March 1819	Edinburghshire	u*	Sir George Clerk	Sir George Clerk	Lord of the Admiralty
16 March 1819	Inverness-shire	u*	Charles Grant	Charles Grant	Chief Secretary for Ireland
16 March 1819	Yarmouth	u*	John Taylor	Sir Peter Pole	Resignation
16 March 1819	Yarmouth	u	William Mount	John Wilson Croker	Resignation
17 March 1819	Carrickfergus	u	Earl of Belfast	Earl of Belfast	Accepted a Commission in the Army
24 March 1819	Fowey	c(*)	Viscount Valletort	Mathias Attwood	Death
24 March 1819	Fowey	c(*)	Mathias Attwood	Viscount Valletort	By-election result reversed on petition 11 May 1819
27 March 1819	Tavistock	u*	Lord William Russell	John Peter Grant	Resignation
29 March 1819	Orford	u*	Edmond Alexander MacNaghten	Edmond Alexander MacNaghten	Junior Lord of the Treasury
29 March 1819	Stirling Burghs	c	John Campbell	Francis Ward Primrose	Void election
30 March 1819	Boroughbridge	u*	Marmaduke Lawson	Marmaduke Lawson	Resigned seat and was re-elected
2 April 1819	Banffshire	u*	The Earl Fife	The Earl Fife	Lord of the Bedchamber
5 April 1819	Appleby	u*	George Fludyer	Adolphus Dalrymple	Resignation
5 April 1819	Monmouthshire	u*	Lord Granville Somerset	Lord Granville Somerset	Junior Lord of the Treasury
8 April 1819	Bossiney	c*	James Archibald Stuart Wortley	John William Ward	Chose to sit for Yorkshire
8 April 1819	County Tipperary	u*	Montague James Mathew	Francis Aldborough Prittie	Death
17 April 1819	Camelford	c	Mark Milbank	John Stewart	Void election. Results voided 16 June 1819. No by-election held.
17 April 1819	Camelford	c	John Bushby Maitland	Lewis Allsopp	Void election. Results voided 16 June 1819. No by-election held.
1 May 1819	Westbury	u	Ralph Franco	William Leader Maberly	Resignation
11 May 1819	Okehampton	u*	Christopher Savile	The Lord Dunalley	Death
20 May 1819	Hythe	c*	John Bladen Taylor	Samuel Jones Loyd	Resignation
25 May 1819	Shrewsbury	c	Richard Lyster	John Mytton	Death
29 May 1819	Tralee	u*	Edward Denny	James Cuffe	Resignation
31 May 1819	Linlithgow Burghs	c	Sir John Buchanan Riddell	John Pringle	Death
18 June 1819	Dorchester	u	Sir Samuel Shepherd	Charles Warren	Resignation (Chief Baron of the Scottish Court of Exchequer)
24 June 1819	Heytesbury	u	William Henry John Scott	William Henry John Scott	Clerk of Patents and Registrar of Affidavits at the Court of Chancery
6 July 1819	Tiverton	u	William Fitzhugh	Viscount Sandon	Resignation
10 July 1819	Bishop's Castle	u	John Robinson	Douglas James William Kinnaird	Death
12 July 1819	Rye	u*	Thomas Phillipps Lamb	John Dodson	Death
17 July 1819	Milborne Port	c	Robert Matthew Casberd	Robert Mathew Casberd	Puisne Justice of the Brecon Circuit
19 July 1819	Eye	u*	Sir Robert Gifford	Sir Robert Gifford	Attorney General for England and Wales
19 July 1819	Wiltshire	c*	Paul Methuen	John Benett	Resignation
20 July 1819	Ashburton	u*	John Singleton Copley	John Singleton Copley	Solicitor General for England and Wales
26 July 1819	Anstruther Easter Burghs	c*	Alexander Maconochie	Sir William Rae	Resignation (Lord of Session and Justiciary in Scotland)
29 July 1819	Edinburgh	c*	William Dundas	William Dundas	Keeper of Sasines
16 September 1819	Kinross-shire	c	Thomas Graham	George Edward Graham	Death
21 September 1819	Hereford	u	Thomas Powell Symonds	Richard Philip Scudamore	Death
8 October 1819	Arundel	c*	Sir Arthur Leary Piggott	Robert Blake	Death
15 October 1819	County Longford	c*	Sir Thomas Fetherston	Sir George Ralph Fetherston	Death
16 November 1819	Kent	u*	Sir Edward Knatchbull	Sir Edward Knatchbull	Death
22 November 1819	Banbury	u*	Frederick Sylvester North Douglas	Heneage Legge	Death
22 November 1819	Chichester	u*	Earl of March	Lord John George Lennox	Succeeded to a peerage
29 November 1819	Hertfordshire	u*	Thomas Brand	William Lamb	Succeeded to a peerage
30 November 1819	Peterborough	u*	William Lamb	Sir Robert Heron	Resignation to contest Hertfordshire
3 December 1819	Cambridge	u*	Edward Finch	Frederick William Trench	Resignation
4 January 1820	Dartmouth	u*	Arthur Howe Holdsworth	Charles Milne Ricketts	Resignation

=== 7th Parliament (1820–1826) ===
Date	Constituency	c/u	Former incumbent	Winner	Cause
22 May 1820	Tavistock	u	John Nicholas Fazakerley	Viscount Ebrington	Resignation
23 May 1820	Appleby	u	George Tierney	Thomas Creevey	Chose to sit for Knaresborough
23 May 1820	Orford	u	Horace Seymour	Edmund Alexander Macnaghten	Chose to sit for Lisburn
30 May 1820	Scarborough	u*	Viscount Normanby	Edmund Phipps	Resignation
31 May 1820	Carlisle	c	John Christian Curwen	William James	Chose to sit for Cumberland
2 June 1820	Athlone	u	John McClintock	David Guardi Ker	Resignation
5 June 1820	Truro	c	William Gossett	William Gossett	Election Voided due to Double Return
5 June 1820	Truro	c	Lord FitzRoy Somerset	William Gossett	Election Voided due to Double Return
14 June 1820	Saltash	u	Michael George Prendergast	John Fleming	Chose to sit for Galway Borough
16 June 1820	Okehampton	u	Albany Savile	Lord Glenorchy	Resignation
27 June 1820	Malmesbury	u	Kirkman Finlay	William Leake	Resignation
27 June 1820	Petersfield	u	The Lord Hotham	Sir Philip Christopher Musgrave	Chose to sit for Leominster
28 June 1820	York	u	Lawrence Dundas	Robert Chaloner	Succeeded to a peerage
29 June 1820	Dundalk	u	John Metge	George Hartopp	Resignation
29 June 1820	Ennis	u	Sir Ross Mahon	Richard Wellesley	Resignation
30 June 1820	Dublin City	c	Henry Grattan	Thomas Ellis	Death
13 July 1820	Berwick-upon-Tweed	u	Sir David Milne	Henry Heneage St Paul	Void election
14 July 1820	Colchester	u	Daniel Whittle Harvey	Henry Baring	Void election
17 July 1820	Old Sarum	u*	Arthur Johnston Crawford	Josias Alexander	Resignation
21 July 1820	Grantham	c	James Hughes	Sir Montague Cholmeley	Void election
3 August 1820	Heytesbury	u	Charles Ashe A'Court	Henry Handley	Resignation
10 August 1820	County Louth	u	Viscount Jocelyn	John Jocelyn	Became an Irish Peer
11 September 1820	County Kilkenny	u*	James Wandesford Butler	Charles Harwood Butler	Became an Irish Peer
17 October 1820	Aberdeenshire	u*	James Ferguson	William Gordon	Death
7 November 1820	Warwickshire	c*	Sir Charles Mordaunt	Francis Lawley	Resignation
29 November 1820	Westbury	u*	Nathaniel Barton	Sir Manasseh Masseh Lopes	Resignation
29 November 1820	Westbury	u	Jonathan Elford	Philip John Miles	Resignation
7 December 1820	Berwick-upon-Tweed	c	Henry Heneage St Paul	Sir Francis Blake	Death
9 January 1821	St Albans	c	William Tierney Robarts	Sir Henry Wright Wilson	Death
16 January 1821	Roscommon	u*	Arthur French	Arthur French	Death
17 January 1821	Yarmouth	u	Theodore Henry Broadhead	Theodore Henry Lavington Brinckman	Death
1 February 1821	Wilton	u*	Viscount FitzHarris	John Hungerford Penruddocke	Succeeded to a peerage
9 February 1821	Newtown	u*	Dudley Long North	Charles Compton Cavendish	Resignation
9 February 1821	New Ross	u	John Carroll	Francis Leigh	Resignation
9 February 1821	County Wicklow	u*	William Parnell Hayes	James Grattan	Death
17 February 1821	Plympton Erle	u	Alexander Boswell	William Gill Paxton	Resignation
19 February 1821	Dunbartonshire	c	Archibald Campbell Colquhoun	John Buchanan	Death
21 March 1821	Wigtown Burghs	u	James Henry Keith Stewart	Sir John Osborn	Resignation to provide a seat for Osborn
4 April 1821	Bere Alston	u*	Lord Lovaine	Lord Lovaine	Lord of the Bedchamber
28 April 1821	Orford	u	John Douglas	The Marquess of Londonderry	Resignation to provide a seat for Londonderry
5 May 1821	Ludgershall	u	The Earl of Carhampton	Earl of Brecknock	Death
9 May 1821	County Down	u	Viscount Castlereagh	Mathew Forde	Became an Irish Peer
11 May 1821	Andover	u*	Thomas Assheton Smith I	Thomas Assheton Smith II	Resignation
24 May 1821	Stirlingshire	c*	Sir Charles Edmonstone	Henry Home Drummond	Death
26 May 1821	St Ives	u*	James Robert George Graham	Sir Christopher Hawkins	Resignation
5 June 1821	Lymington	u	George Finch	William Manning	Resignation
5 July 1821	Carmarthen	c*	John Frederick Campbell	John Jones	Succeeded to a peerage
21 July 1821	Cockermouth	u*	John Beckett	William Wilson Carus Wilson	Resignation
30 July 1821	King's County	u*	John Clere Parsons	Lord Oxmantown	Resignation (Judge of the Insolvent Court in Ireland
21 August 1821	Oxford University	c	Sir William Scott	Richard Heber	Elevated to the peerage
27 August 1821	Queen's County	u*	William Wellesley Pole	Sir Charles Coote	Elevated to the peerage
12 September 1821	Shaftesbury	u*	Edward Harbord	John Ralph Leycester	Succeeded to a peerage
27 September 1821	County Louth	u	John Foster	Thomas Henry Skeffington	Elevated to the peerage
18 October 1821	Shropshire	u*	John Cotes	Rowland Hill	Death
9 January 1822	King's Lynn	u	Sir Martin Brown Ffolkes	Marquess of Titchfield	Death
12 January 1822	County Antrim	u	Hugh Henry John Seymour	Viscount Beauchamp	Death
1 February 1822	Castle Rising	u*	Earl of Rocksavage	Lord William Henry Hugh Cholmondeley	Called to the House of Lords through a Writ of acceleration
11 February 1822	Buckingham	u*	William Henry Fremantle	William Henry Fremantle	Commissioner of the Board of Control
11 February 1822	Great Bedwyn	u*	Sir John Nicholl	Sir John Nicholl	Resignation to contest Oxford University
11 February 1822	Higham Ferrers	u	William Plumer	Viscount Normanby	Death
12 February 1822	Caernarvon Boroughs	u	Sir Charles Paget	Sir Charles Paget	Groom of the Bedchamber
12 February 1822	Oxford University	u*	Robert Peel	Robert Peel	Home Secretary
13 February 1822	St Mawes	u	Joseph Phillimore	Joseph Phillimore	Commissioner of the Board of Control
13 February 1822	West Looe	u	Henry Goulburn	Henry Goulburn	Chief Secretary for Ireland
14 February 1822	Droitwich	u*	Thomas Foley	John Hodgetts Hodgetts Foley	Death
14 February 1822	Dublin University	u*	William Conyngham Plunket	William Conyngham Plunket	Attorney General for Ireland
18 February 1822	Dungarvan	u*	Augustus Clifford	George Lamb	Resignation
18 February 1822	Montgomeryshire	u*	Charles Williams Wynn	Charles Williams Wynn	President of the Board of Control
19 February 1822	Bletchingley	u	Marquess of Titchfield	Lord Francis Leveson Gower	Resignation to contest King's Lynn
8 March 1822	Dumfries Burghs	u*	William Robert Keith Douglas	William Robert Keith Douglas	Lord of the Admiralty
9 March 1822	Drogheda	c	Henry Metcalfe	William Meade Smyth	Death
14 March 1822	Argyllshire	u*	Lord John Campbell	Walter Frederick Campbell	Resignation
23 March 1822	Lincoln	u	Coningsby Waldo Waldo Sibthorpe	John Williams	Death
8 April 1822	Dartmouth	u	Charles Milner Ricketts	James Hamilton Stanhope	Resignation
12 April 1822	Minehead	u	Henry Fownes Luttrell	John Douglas	Resignation
30 April 1822	Shaftesbury	u	Abraham Moore	Robert Grosvenor	Resignation
22 May 1822	Saltash	u	Matthew Russell	William Russell	Death
26 June 1822	Camelford	c*	Earl of Yarmouth	Sheldon Cradock	Succeeded to a peerage
29 June 1822	King's Lynn	c*	Lord Walpole	John Walpole	Succeeded to a peerage
30 July 1822	Stockbridge	u	Joseph Foster Barham	Edward Stanley	Resignation
30 July 1822	Wigtownshire	c*	James Hunter Blair	Sir William Maxwell	Death
14 August 1822	Clitheroe	u	William Cust	Henry Porcher	Resignation
1 October 1822	Orford	u	The Marquess of Londonderry	Charles Ross	Death (suicide)
25 November 1822	Derbyshire	u*	Edward Miller Mundy	Francis Mundy	Death
27 November 1822	Cambridge University	c	John Henry Smyth	William John Bankes	Death
2 December 1822	Shropshire	u*	Sir John Kynaston Powell	John Cressett Pelham	Death
4 December 1822	County Sligo	c*	Charles O'Hara	Henry King	Death
20 December 1822	Ross-shire	u*	Thomas Mackenzie	Sir James Wemyss Mackenzie	Death
6 January 1823	Wilton	u*	Ralph Sheldon	Edward Baker	Death
10 February 1823	Harwich	u	Nicholas Vansittart	George Canning	Resignation
10 February 1823	Harwich	u*	Charles Bathurst	John Charles Herries	Resignation
11 February 1823	County Dublin	c*	Hans Hamilton	Henry White	Death
11 February 1823	New Windsor	u	Sir Herbert Taylor	Sir Edward Cromwell Disbrowe	Resignation
11 February 1823	Ripon	u*	Frederick John Robinson	Frederick John Robinson	Chancellor of the Exchequer
12 February 1823	Peterborough	c*	James Scarlett	James Scarlett	Resignation to contest Cambridge University
12 February 1823	St Germans	u*	Charles Arbuthnot	Charles Arbuthnot	First Commissioner of Woods and Forests
15 February 1823	Liverpool	c*	George Canning	William Huskisson	Foreign Secretary
17 February 1823	Berwick-upon-Tweed	u	Lord Ossulston	Sir John Poo Beresford	Succeeded to a peerage
18 February 1823	Chichester	c*	William Huskisson	William Stephen Poyntz	Treasurer of the Navy
18 February 1823	Winchester	u*	James Henry Leigh	Sir Edward Hyde East	Resignation
20 February 1823	Winchelsea	u	Lucius Concannon	William Leader	Death
21 February 1823	Arundel	c	Robert Blake	Thomas Read Kemp	Death
22 February 1823	Coleraine	u*	Sir John Poo Beresford	Sir John William Head Brydges	Resignation to contest Berwick
24 February 1823	Bossiney	u	Sir Compton Domville	Sir Compton Domville	Resignation to contest County Dublin
26 February 1823	Dorset	u*	Edward Berkeley Portman	Edward Berkeley Portman II	Death
28 February 1823	Reigate	u	James Somers Cocks	James Cocks	Resignation
4 March 1823	Rye	u	John Dodson	Robert Knight	Resignation
8 March 1823	County Fermanagh	c*	Sir Galbraith Lowry Cole	Viscount Corry	Resignation (Governor of Mauritius)
18 March 1823	Corfe Castle	u*	George Bankes	John Bond	Resignation
21 March 1823	Newport (Cornwall)	c	Jonathan Raine	Jonathan Raine	Chief Justice of the North Wales Circuit
3 April 1823	Lymington	u*	Sir Harry Neale	Walter Boyd	Resignation
4 April 1823	Durham City	c*	Sir Henry Hardinge	Sir Henry Hardinge	Clerk of the Ordnance
11 April 1823	Inverness-shire	u*	Charles Grant	Charles Grant	Vice-President of the Board of Trade
15 April 1823	Haslemere	u*	Robert Ward	George Lowther Thompson	Resignation (Auditor of the Civil List)
2 June 1823	Bossiney	c*	John William Ward	John Stuart Wortley	Succeeded to a peerage
27 June 1823	Hertford	c*	Viscount Cranborne	Thomas Byron	Succeeded to a peerage
23 July 1823	Staffordshire	u*	Sir John Boughey	Sir John Wrottesley	Death
24 July 1823	Newcastle-under-Lyme	c	William Shepherd Kinnersley	John Evelyn Denison	Death
6 December 1823	Lincolnshire	c*	Charles Anderson Pelham	Sir William Amcotts Ingilby	Succeeded to a peerage
16 January 1824	Liskeard	u*	William Eliot	Lord Eliot	Succeeded to a peerage
9 February 1824	Oxford	u	Charles Wetherell	Charles Wetherell	Solicitor General for England and Wales
10 February 1824	Sandwich	u	Joseph Marryatt	Henry Bonham	Death
11 February 1824	Ashburton	u	Sir John Singleton Copley	Sir John Singleton Copley	Attorney General for England and Wales
11 February 1824	Weymouth and Melcombe Regis	u*	Thomas Wallace	Thomas Wallace	Master of the Mint
13 February 1824	Eye	u*	Sir Robert Gifford	Sir Edward Kerrison	Elevated to the peerage and appointed Chief Justice of the Common Pleas
16 February 1824	Weobley	u	Lord Frederick Cavendish Bentinck	Lord Henry Thynne	Resignation to contest Queenborough
21 February 1824	County Louth	u*	Thomas Henry Skeffington	John Leslie Foster	Became an Irish Peer
24 February 1824	County Cavan	u*	John Maxwell Barry	Henry Maxwell	Became an Irish Peer
1 March 1824	Portarlington	u*	David Ricardo	William James Farquhar	Death
4 March 1824	Dumfries Burghs	u*	William Robert Keith Douglas	William Robert Keith Douglas	Lord of the Admiralty
4 March 1824	Wigtown Burghs	u	Sir John Osborn	Nicholas Conyngham Tindal	Resignation (Commissioner for Auditing Public Accounts)
5 March 1821	New Ross	u	Francis Leigh	John Doherty	Resignation
5 March 1824	County Westmeath	u	Gustavus Hume Rochfort	Robert Smyth	Death
8 March 1824	Barnstaple	c*	Michael Nolan	Frederick Hodgson	Chief Justice of the Brecon Circuit
8 March 1824	Oxfordshire	u*	John Fane	John Fane	Death
11 March 1824	Plympton Erle	u*	Ranald George Macdonald	John Henry North	Resignation
19 March 1824	King's Lynn	c*	Marquess of Titchfield	Marquess of Titchfield	Death
22 March 1824	Queenborough	u	John Charles Villiers	Lord Frederick Cavendish Bentinck	Succeeded to a peerage
5 April 1824	County Leitrim	u*	Luke White	Samuel White	Death
6 April 1824	Perthshire	u*	James Andrew John Lawrence Charles Drummond	Sir George Murray	Resignation
20 April 1824	Lancaster	u*	Gabriel Doveton	Thomas Greene	Death
5 May 1824	Dundalk	u	George Hartopp	Sir Robert Inglis	Death
10 May 1824	Penryn	c	Henry Swann	Robert Stanton	Death of Henry Swann
14 May 1824	Huntingdon	c*	Earl of Ancram	James Stuart	Succeeded to a peerage
28 May 1824	Northallerton	u	Henry Peirse	Marcus Beresford	Death
2 June 1824	Okehampton	u	The Lord Dunalley	William Henry Trant	Resignation
18 June 1824	Marlborough	u*	Lord Brudenell	Lord Brudenell	Accepted a Commission in the Army
24 June 1824	Plympton Erle	u	John Henry North	John Henry North	King's Counsel
30 June 1824	Steyning	u	Lord Henry Thomas Howard Molyneux Howard	Henry Howard	Death
13 July 1824	Clackmannanshire	u	Robert Bruce	George Ralph Abercromby	Resignation
27 January 1825	Cornwall	u*	Sir William Lemon	Sir Richard Vyvyan	Death
4 February 1825	Cambridge	u*	Charles Madryll Cheere	Marquess of Graham	Death
11 February 1825	Newton	u	Thomas Claughton	Sir Robert Townsend Farquhar	Resignation
18 February 1825	Newport	u	Sir Leonard Worsley Holmes	John Stuart	Death
21 February 1825	County Donegal	u*	Earl of Mount Charles	Earl of Mount Charles	Death
28 February 1825	Brackley	u*	Henry Wrottesley	James Bradshaw	Death
8 March 1825	Bramber	u	William Wilberforce	Arthur Gough Calthorpe	Resignation
25 March 1825	Dartmouth	u*	James Hamilton Stanhope	John Hutton Cooper	Death
30 March 1825	Berkshire	u*	Richard Neville	Robert Palmer	Succeeded to a peerage
2 April 1825	Carlisle	u*	Sir James Graham	Sir Philip Christopher Musgrave	Death
2 April 1825	Petersfield	u	Sir Philip Christopher Musgrave	James Law Lushington	Resignation to contest Carlisle
6 April 1825	Wigan	u*	Lord Lindsay	James Lindsay	Resignation upon becoming a Scottish peer
6 May 1825	Bere Alston	u*	Henry Percy	Percy Ashburnham	Death
27 June 1825	County Tyrone	u*	Sir John Stewart	Henry Thomas Lowry Corry	Death
8 February 1826	Newport (Cornwall)	u*	William Northey	Charles Percy	Death
9 February 1826	Exeter	u*	William Courtenay	Samuel Trehawke Kekewich	Resignation (Clerk Assistant of the Parliaments)
10 February 1826	Banbury	u*	Heneage Legge	Arthur Charles Legge	Resignation (Commissioner of Customs)
11 February 1826	Warwick	c*	Charles Mills	John Tomes	Death
13 February 1826	Corfe Castle	u*	Henry Bankes	George Bankes	Resignation to contest Dorset
16 February 1826	Dorset	u*	William Morton Pitt	Henry Bankes	Resignation
21 February 1826	Northumberland	c*	Charles John Brandling	Matthew Bell	Death
22 February 1826	Oxford University	u*	Richard Heber	Thomas Grimston Bucknall Estcourt	Resignation
1 March 1826	Devizes	u*	Thomas Grimston Bucknall Estcourt	George Watson-Taylor	Resignation to contest Oxford University
3 March 1826	East Looe	u	George Watson-Taylor	Viscount Perceval	Resignation to contest Devizes
17 March 1826	Horsham	u*	Sir John Aubrey	Henry Edward Fox	Death
6 April 1826	County Carlow	u*	Sir Ulysses Bagenal Burgh	Thomas Kavanagh	Became an Irish Peer
6 April 1826	Mitchell	u*	William Taylor Money	Henry Labouchere	Resignation (Consul General at Venice)
8 May 1826	Roxburghshire	u*	Sir Alexander Don	Henry Francis Hepburne Scott	Death

=== 8th Parliament (1826–1830) ===
Date	Constituency	c/u	Former incumbent	Winner	Cause
14 December 1826	Harwich	u	Nicholas Conyngham Tindal	Nicholas Conyngham Tindal	Solicitor General for England and Wales
15 December 1826	Hastings	u	Sir William Curtis	James Law Lushington	Resignation
15 December 1826	Hastings	u	Sir Charles Wetherell	John Evelyn Denison	Attorney General for England and Wales
15 December 1826	Stafford	c	Richard Ironmonger	Thomas Wentworth Beaumont	Death
16 December 1826	Cambridge University	u*	Sir John Singleton Copley	Sir John Singleton Copley	Master of the Rolls
16 December 1826	Downton	u	Thomas Grimston Bucknall Estcourt	Bartholomew Bouverie	Chose to sit for Oxford University
16 December 1826	Plympton Erle	u*	George Edgcumbe	Charles Wetherell	Resignation
16 December 1826	Wallingford	c*	George James Robarts	Robert Knight	Resignation (Ill-health)
18 December 1826	Downton	u	Robert Southey	Alexander Powell	Declined seat due to lack of property qualifications
18 December 1826	Lostwithiel	u	Sir Alexander Cray Grant	Edward Cust	Chose to sit for Aldborough
19 December 1826	Bandon Bridge	u	Viscount Duncannon	Lord John Russell	Chose to sit for County Kilkenny
19 December 1826	Saltash	u	Henry Monteith	Colin Campbell Macaulay	Resignation
26 December 1826	Orford	u	Horace Seymour	Quintin Dick	Chose to sit for Bodmin
29 December 1826	Cork City	c	Christopher Hely Hutchinson	John Hely Hutchinson	Death
14 February 1827	Horsham	u*	Henry Edward Fox	Nicholas William Ridley Colborne	Resignation
16 February 1827	Cockermouth	u	William Wilson Carus Wilson	Laurence Peel	Resignation
29 March 1827	Berwick-upon-Tweed	c*	John Gladstone	Sir Francis Blake	Void election
6 April 1827	West Looe	u*	John Buller	Sir Charles Hulse	Resignation
20 April 1827	Seaford	u*	Augustus Frederick Ellis	George Canning	Resignation to provide a seat for Canning
21 April 1827	Hastings	u*	James Law Lushington	Joseph Planta	Resignation to contest Carlisle
24 April 1827	Newport	u	George Canning	William Lamb	First Lord of the Treasury
7 May 1827	Bletchingley	u	William Russell	William Lamb	Resignation
8 May 1827	Ashburton	u	William Sturges Bourne	William Sturges Bourne	Home Secretary
9 May 1827	Liskeard	u*	Lord Eliot	Lord Eliot	Junior Lord of the Treasury
9 May 1827	Peterborough	u*	James Scarlett	James Scarlett	Attorney General for England and Wales
10 May 1827	Sandwich	u*	Sir Edward Owen	Sir Edward Owen	Surveyor-General of the Ordnance
11 May 1827	Cambridge University	c	Sir John Singleton Copley	Sir Nicholas Conyngham Tindal	Appointed Lord Chancellor
15 May 1827	Dublin University	c	William Conyngham Plunket	John Wilson Croker	Elevated to the peerage
15 May 1827	Edinburghshire	u*	Sir George Clerk	Sir George Clerk	Clerk of the Ordnance
15 May 1827	Ripon	u*	Frederick John Robinson	Louis Hayes Petit	Elevated to the peerage
16 May 1827	Harwich	u	Nicholas Conyngham Tindal	Sir William Rae	Resignation to contest Cambridge University
22 May 1827	Aldeburgh	u	John Wilson Croker	Wyndham Lewis	Resignation to contest Dublin University
23 May 1827	Buckingham	u*	William Henry Fremantle	Sir Thomas Francis Fremantle	Resignation
23 May 1827	Sutherland	u*	Lord Francis Leveson Gower	Lord Francis Leveson Gower	Junior Lord of the Treasury
24 May 1827	Knaresborough	u	George Tierney	George Tierney	Master of the Mint
25 May 1827	Calne	u	James Abercromby	James Abercromby	Judge Advocate General
25 May 1827	Calne	u*	Sir James Macdonald	Sir James Macdonald	Commissioner of the Board of Control
25 May 1827	Newport	u	William Lamb	Spencer Perceval	Chief Secretary for Ireland
7 June 1827	St Germans	u	Charles Arbuthnot	James Loch	Resignation
9 July 1827	Lymington	u	Guy Lenox Prendergast	Thomas Divett	Resignation
9 July 1827	Milborne Port	u	The Lord Graves	John Henry North	Resignation (Commissioner of Excise)
20 July 1827	County Kerry	u*	Maurice FitzGerald	Maurice FitzGerald	Junior Lord of the Treasury
16 August 1827	Carlisle	c*	Sir Philip Christopher Musgrave	James Law Lushington	Death
21 August 1827	Yarmouth	u	Lord Binning	Thomas Wallace	Elevated to the peerage
5 September 1827	Seaford	c*	George Canning	Augustus Frederick Ellis	Death
16 October 1827	Lanarkshire	c	Lord Archibald Hamilton	Sir Michael Shaw Stewart	Death
3 December 1827	Maldon	c	George Mark Arthur Way Allanson Winn	Hugh Dick	Death
4 December 1827	County Cork	u	Viscount Ennismore	John Boyle	Death
4 February 1828	Harwich	u*	John Charles Herries	John Charles Herries	Chancellor of the Exchequer
4 February 1828	Haslemere	u*	Sir John Beckett	Sir John Beckett	Judge Advocate General
4 February 1828	King's Lynn	u*	Lord William Bentinck	Lord George Bentinck	Resignation
4 February 1828	Oxford University	u	Robert Peel	Robert Peel	Home Secretary
5 February 1828	Ashburton	u	William Sturges Bourne	William Sturges Bourne	First Commissioner of Woods and Forests
5 February 1828	Liverpool	u*	William Huskisson	William Huskisson	Secretary of State for War and the Colonies
6 February 1828	Armagh City	u*	Henry Goulburn	Henry Goulburn	Chancellor of the Exchequer
6 February 1828	Durham City	c*	Sir Henry Hardinge	Sir Henry Hardinge	Clerk of the Ordnance
8 February 1828	Cambridge	u*	Marquess of Graham	Marquess of Graham	Commissioner of the Board of Control
8 February 1828	Corfe Castle	u	John Bond	Nathaniel William Peach	Resignation
8 February 1828	Richmond	u*	Samuel Barrett Moulton Barrett	Robert Lawrence Dundas	Resignation
8 February 1828	Ripon	u	Lancelot Shadwell	Sir Robert Inglis	Resignation (Vice Chancellor)
8 February 1828	New Woodstock	u	Lord Ashley	Lord Ashley	Commissioner of the Board of Control
9 February 1828	Plympton Erle	u	Charles Wetherell	Charles Wetherell	Attorney General for England and Wales
11 February 1828	Bath	u	Earl of Brecknock	Earl of Brecknock	Appointed to the Council of the Lord High Admiral
11 February 1828	Dover	c	Edward Bootle Wilbraham	William Henry Trant	Elevated to the peerage
11 February 1828	Ennis	u	Thomas Frankland Lewis	Thomas Frankland Lewis	Vice President of the Board of Trade
11 February 1828	Enniskillen	u*	Richard Magenis	Arthur Henry Cole	Resignation
12 February 1828	Monmouthshire	u*	Lord Granville Somerset	Lord Granville Somerset	Junior Lord of the Treasury
13 February 1828	County Durham	u*	John George Lambton	William Russell	Elevated to the peerage
18 February 1828	Edinburghshire	u*	Sir George Clerk	Sir George Clerk	Appointed to the Council of the Lord High Admiral
18 February 1828	Kilkenny City	c	John Doherty	John Doherty	Solicitor-General for Ireland
20 February 1828	Salisbury	u*	Viscount Folkestone	Duncombe Pleydell Bouverie	Succeeded to a peerage
20 February 1828	Weymouth and Melcombe Regis	c*	Thomas Wallace	Edward Burtenshaw Sugden	Elevated to the peerage
28 February 1828	Inverness-shire	u*	Charles Grant	Charles Grant	President of the Board of Trade and Treasurer of the Navy
29 February 1828	St Ives	u*	Sir Christopher Hawkins	Charles Arbuthnot	Resignation
14 March 1828	Sandwich	u	Sir Edward Owen	Sir Edward Owen	Appointed to the Council of the Lord High Admiral
20 March 1828	County Longford	u*	Viscount Forbes	Viscount Forbes	Comptroller of the Household to the Lord Lieutenant of Ireland
2 April 1828	Old Sarum	u	Josias Alexander	Stratford Canning	Resignation
3 April 1828	Anglesey	u*	Earl of Uxbridge	Earl of Uxbridge	State Steward to the Lord Lieutenant of Ireland
7 April 1828	Dumfriesshire	u	Sir William Johnstone Hope	Sir William Johnstone Hope	Treasurer of Greenwich Hospital
9 April 1828	Radnorshire	u*	Walter Wilkins	Thomas Frankland Lewis	Death
9 April 1828	Sudbury	c	John Wilks	John Norman MacLeod	Resignation
23 April 1828	Ennis	u	Thomas Frankland Lewis	William Smith O'Brien	Resignation to contest Radnorshire
7 June 1828	Plymouth	u*	Sir William Congreve	Sir George Cockburn	Death
9 June 1828	Durham City	u	Sir Henry Hardinge	Sir Henry Hardinge	Secretary at War
9 June 1828	Totnes	u*	Thomas Peregrine Courtenay	Thomas Peregrine Courtenay	Vice-President of the Board of Trade
10 June 1828	St Ives	u	Charles Arbuthnot	Charles Arbuthnot	Chancellor of the Duchy of Lancaster
12 June 1828	Weobley	u*	Sir George Cockburn	Lord Henry Frederick Thynne	Resignation to contest Plymouth
16 June 1828	Westmorland	u*	Viscount Lowther	Viscount Lowther	First Commissioner of Woods and Forests
17 June 1828	Perthshire	u*	Sir George Murray	Sir George Murray	Secretary of State for War and the Colonies
17 June 1828	Wenlock	u*	John George Weld Weld Forester	George Cecil Weld Forester	Succeeded to a peerage
23 June 1828	Wareham	u*	John Calcraft	John Calcraft	Paymaster of the Forces
5 July 1828	County Clare	c*	William Vesey FitzGerald	Daniel O'Connell	President of the Board of Trade
7 July 1828	Sutherland	u*	Lord Francis Leveson Gower	Lord Francis Leveson Gower	Chief Secretary for Ireland
23 July 1828	Bletchingley	u	William Lamb	William Ewart	Resignation
31 July 1828	Lymington	u*	Thomas Divett	George Burrard	Death
7 August 1828	Newport	u*	Spencer Perceval	Spencer Perceval	Clerk of the Ordnance
12 September 1828	Tralee	u	James Cuffe	Sir Edward Denny	Death
16 January 1829	Cumberland	u*	John Christian Curwen	Sir James Robert George Graham	Death
26 January 1829	Dartmouth	u*	Sir John Hutton Cooper	Arthur Howe Holdsworth	Death
11 February 1829	East Grinstead	u*	Charles Jenkinson	Viscount Holmesdale	Succeeded to a peerage
12 February 1829	Plymouth	u*	Sir George Cockburn	Sir George Cockburn	First Naval Lord
12 February 1829	Whitchurch	u*	John Robert Townshend	John Robert Townshend	Groom of the Bedchamber
13 February 1829	Bath	c	Earl of Brecknock	Earl of Brecknock	Lord of the Admiralty (Two MPs elected due to Double Return)
13 February 1829	Bath	c	Earl of Brecknock	Charles Palmer	Lord of the Admiralty (Two MPs elected due to Double Return)
18 February 1829	Carlisle	c	Sir James Robert George Graham	Sir William Scott	Resignation to contest Cumberland
23 February 1829	Edinburghshire	u*	Sir George Clerk	Sir George Clerk	Lord of the Admiralty
27 February 1829	Aldeburgh	u*	Wyndham Lewis	Marquess of Douro	Resignation
28 February 1829	Oxford University	c*	Robert Peel	Sir Robert Inglis	Seeks re-election over the Catholic Relief Act
2 March 1829	Ripon	u	Sir Robert Inglis	George Spence	Resignation to contest Oxford University
6 March 1829	Westbury	u	Sir Manasseh Masseh Lopes	Robert Peel	Resignation to provide a seat for Peel
6 March 1829	Corfe Castle	u*	Nathaniel William Peach	Philip John Miles	Resignation to contest Truro
6 March 1829	Newark-on-Trent	c*	William Henry Clinton	Michael Thomas Sadler	Resignation
6 March 1829	Truro	u*	Lord FitzRoy James Henry Somerset	Viscount Encombe	Resignation
6 March 1829	Truro	u*	William Edward Tomline	Nathaniel William Peach	Resignation
11 March 1829	Bath	c	Earl of Brecknock	Earl of Brecknock	Election voided due to Double Return
11 March 1829	Bath	c	Charles Palmer	Earl of Brecknock	Election voided due to Double Return
13 March 1829	Marlborough	u*	Earl Bruce	Thomas Bucknall Estcourt	Resignation
17 March 1829	Launceston	u*	Pownoll Bastard Pellew	Sir James Willoughby Gordon	Resignation
20 March 1829	Newport (Cornwall)	u	Charles Bertie Percy	William Vesey FitzGerald	Resignation (Comptroller of the Household to the Lord Lieutenant of Ireland)
23 March 1829	Marlborough	u*	Lord Brudenell	William John Bankes	Resignation
30 March 1829	Sandwich	c	Sir Edward Owen	Henry Fane	Resignation
20 April 1829	Colchester	u	Sir George Henry Smyth	Richard Sanderson	Resignation
4 May 1829	Horsham	u*	Robert Hurst	Earl of Surrey	Resignation
9 May 1829	East Looe	u*	James Drummond Buller Elphinstone	Henry Thomas Hope	Resignation
13 May 1829	Ayrshire	u*	James Montgomerie	William Blair	Death
25 May 1829	Aldeburgh	u	Joshua Walker	Spencer Horsey Kilderbee	Resignation
3 June 1829	Wexford	c	Henry Evans	Sir Robert Wigram	Resignation
3 June 1829	Wexford	c	Sir Robert Wigram	Sir Edward Dering	By-election result reversed on petition 15 March 1830.
9 June 1829	Cambridge	u*	Frederick William Trench	Frederick William Trench	Storekeeper of the Ordnance
9 June 1829	Tralee	u*	Sir Edward Denny	Robert Vernon Smith	Resignation
15 June 1829	Weymouth and Melcombe Regis	c*	Edward Burtenshaw Sugden	Edward Burtenshaw Sugden	Solicitor General for England and Wales
18 June 1829	Cambridge University	c*	Sir Nicholas Conyngham Tindal	William Cavendish	Resignation (Chief Justice of the Common Pleas)
22 June 1829	Peterborough	u	James Scarlett	James Scarlett	Attorney General for England and Wales
2 July 1829	Corfe Castle	u*	George Bankes	George Bankes	Resignation to Contest Cambridge University
9 July 1829	Cork City	c	Sir Nicholas Colthurst	Gerrard Callaghan	Death
15 July 1829	County Down	u*	Viscount Castlereagh	Viscount Castlereagh	Lord of the Admiralty
22 July 1829	County Wicklow	u*	Granville Proby	Ralph Howard	Resignation
30 July 1829	County Clare	u	Daniel O'Connell	Daniel O'Connell	Refused to take the Oath of Supremacy
19 October 1829	Eye	u*	Sir Miles Nightingall	Philip Charles Sidney	Death
13 January 1830	Southampton	c*	William Chamberlayne	James Barlow Hoy	Death
2 February 1830	County Limerick	c(*)	Thomas Lloyd	Standish O'Grady	Death
2 February 1830	County Limerick	c	Standish O'Grady	James Hewitt Massy Dawson	By-election result reversed on petition 3 May 1830
10 February 1830	Harwich	u*	John Charles Herries	John Charles Herries	President of the Board of Trade
11 February 1830	Leominster	u	Rowland Stephenson	John Ward	Unseated for Bankruptcy
12 February 1830	West Looe	u*	Charles Buller	Charles Buller	Resignation
15 February 1830	Calne	u*	James Abercromby	Thomas Babington Macaulay	Resignation (Lord Chief Baron of the Court of Exchequer in Scotland)
15 February 1830	Winchelsea	u*	Henry Brougham	John Williams	Resignation to contest Knaresborough
16 February 1830	Knaresborough	u*	George Tierney	Henry Brougham	Death
20 February 1830	Fowey	u*	Lord Brudenell	Robert Henley Eden	Resignation
20 February 1830	Wenlock	u*	George Cecil Weld Forester	George Cecil Weld Forester	Groom of the Bedchamber
22 February 1830	Clonmel	u*	James Hewitt Massy Dawson	Eyre Coote	Resignation to contest County Limerick
22 February 1830	County Meath	u*	Earl of Bective	Lord Killeen	Became an Irish Peer
1 March 1830	Radnorshire	u*	Thomas Frankland Lewis	Thomas Frankland Lewis	Treasurer of the Navy
1 March 1830	Rye	c	Henry Bonham	Philip Pusey	Resignation
1 March 1830	Rye	c	Philip Pusey	De Lacy Evans	By-election result reversed on petition 17 May 1830
2 March 1830	County Waterford	c*	Henry Villiers Stuart	Lord George Thomas Beresford	Resignation
8 March 1830	Gatton	u	William Scott	Joseph Neeld	Resignation
11 March 1830	Essex	c	Sir Eliab Harvey	Thomas Gardiner Bramston	Death
26 March 1830	Hythe	u*	Sir Robert Townsend Farquhar	John Loch	Death
29 March 1830	Cork City	c*	Gerrard Callaghan	Daniel Callaghan	Void election
10 April 1830	Dorchester	u	Anthony William Ashley Cooper	Henry Sturt	Resignation
13 April 1830	East Looe	u*	Henry Thomas Hope	Henry Thomas Hope	Groom of the Bedchamber
14 April 1830	Corfe Castle	u*	George Bankes	George Bankes	Junior Lord of the Treasury
20 April 1830	County Kerry	u*	Maurice FitzGerald	Maurice FitzGerald	Vice Treasurer of Ireland
3 May 1830	St Mawes	u*	Sir Scrope Bernard Morland	George Grenville Wandisford Pigott	Death

=== 9th Parliament (1830–1831) ===
Date	Constituency	c/u	Former incumbent	Winner	Cause
24 November 1830	Peterborough	u*	Viscount Milton	John Nicholas Fazakerley	Resignation
25 November 1830	Southwark	u*	John Rawlinson Harris	Charles Calvert	Death
27 November 1830	Tavistock	u*	Viscount Ebrington	Lord John Russell	Chose to sit for Devon
29 November 1830	Dover	u*	Charles Poulett Thomson	Charles Poulett Thomson	Vice-President of the Board of Trade and Treasurer of the Navy
29 November 1830	Nottingham	u*	Thomas Denman	Thomas Denman	Attorney General for England and Wales
29 November 1830	Okehampton	u	George Agar Ellis	George Agar Ellis	First Commissioner of Woods and Forests
29 November 1830	Portsmouth	u*	Francis Thornhill Baring	Francis Thornhill Baring	Junior Lord of the Treasury
30 November 1830	Cambridge University	u	The Viscount Palmerston	The Viscount Palmerston	Foreign Secretary
30 November 1830	Liverpool	c*	William Huskisson	William Ewart	Death (Rail accident). Results voided 23 March 1831. No By-election held.
30 November 1830	Norwich	u*	Robert Grant	Robert Grant	Judge Advocate General
1 December 1830	Helston	u	Sir Samuel John Brooke Pechell	Sir Samuel John Brooke Pechell	Third Naval Lord
2 December 1830	Knaresborough	c*	Henry Brougham	The Lord Waterpark	Appointed Lord Chancellor
2 December 1830	Knaresborough	u*	Sir James Mackintosh	Sir James Mackintosh	Commissioner of the Board of Control
3 December 1830	Aylesbury	u*	The Lord Nugent	The Lord Nugent	Junior Lord of the Treasury
4 December 1830	Youghal	u*	George Ponsonby	George Ponsonby	Junior Lord of the Treasury
4 December 1830	Tralee	u	Robert Vernon Smith	Robert Vernon Smith	Junior Lord of the Treasury
6 December 1830	Northamptonshire	u*	Viscount Althorp	Viscount Althorp	Chancellor of the Exchequer
7 December 1830	Yorkshire	c*	Henry Brougham	Sir John Vanden Bempde Johnstone	Appointed Lord Chancellor
8 December 1830	Cumberland	u*	Sir James Graham	Sir James Graham	First Lord of the Admiralty
10 December 1830	Calne	u*	Sir James Macdonald	Sir James Macdonald	Commissioner of the Board of Control
11 December 1830	Chester	c*	Robert Grosvenor	Robert Grosvenor	Comptroller of the Household
15 December 1830	Montgomeryshire	u*	Charles Williams Wynn	Charles Williams Wynn	Secretary at War
17 December 1830	Newport (Cornwall)	u*	John Doherty	Sir Henry Hardinge	Resignation
17 December 1830	Preston	c*	Edward Stanley	Henry Hunt	Chief Secretary for Ireland
17 December 1830	St Germans	u*	Sir Henry Hardinge	Winthrop Mackworth Praed	Resignation to contest Newport
20 December 1830	Lostwithiel	u*	William Vesey FitzGerald	Viscount Valletort	Resignation
23 December 1830	Plympton Erle	u*	Viscount Valletort	Sir Compton Domvile	Resignation to contest Lostwithiel
28 December 1830	Dungannon	u*	Thomas Knox	John James Knox	Resignation
30 December 1830	Inverness-shire	u*	Charles Grant	Charles Grant	President of the Board of Control
6 January 1831	Bandon Bridge	u*	Viscount Bernard	Viscount Bernard	Became an Irish Peer
10 January 1831	Bletchingley	u*	Charles Tennyson	Charles Tennyson	Clerk of the Ordnance
11 January 1831	Bere Alston	c*	Lord Lovaine	David Lyon	Succeeded to a peerage
13 January 1831	Perth Burghs	c(*)	John Stuart Wortley	Francis Jeffrey	Void election
13 January 1831	Perth Burghs	c	Francis Jeffrey	William Ogilvy	By-election result reversed on petition 28 March 1831
8 February 1831	Beaumaris	u*	Sir Robert Williams	Sir Richard Bulkeley Williams Bulkeley	Death
10 February 1831	New Windsor	u*	Sir Richard Hussey Vivian	Edward Stanley	Resignation
16 February 1831	Bossiney	u*	Charles James Stuart Wortley	John Stuart Wortley	Resignation
18 February 1831	Bletchingley	u	Robert William Mills	Sir William Horne	Resignation to provide a seat for Horne
21 February 1831	Newark	c*	Henry Willoughby	William Farnworth Handley	Resignation
25 February 1831	Ashburton	u*	Charles Arbuthnot	William Stephen Poyntz	Resignation
25 February 1831	Whitchurch	u*	John Robert Townshend	Horatio George Powys Townshend	Succeeded to a peerage
26 February 1831	Saltash	u	John Gregson	Philip Cecil Crampton	Resignation
28 February 1831	County Kilkenny	c*	Viscount Duncannon	Viscount Duncannon	First Commissioner of Woods and Forests
1 March 1831	Wigan	c*	James Alexander Hodson	John Hodson Kearsley	Resignation
4 March 1831	Milborne Port	u*	George Stevens Byng	Richard Lalor Sheil	Resignation (Comptroller of the Household to the Lord Lieutenant of Ireland)
4 March 1831	Peeblesshire	u*	Sir James Montgomery	Sir George Montgomery	Resignation
14 March 1831	Eye	u*	Philip Charles Sidney	William Burge	Resignation
14 March 1831	Lancaster	u*	John Fenton Cawthorne	Patrick Maxwell Stewart	Death
14 March 1831	Milborne Port	u*	William Sturges Bourne	George Stephens Byng	Resignation
15 March 1831	Chester	u*	Robert Grosvenor	Robert Grosvenor	Voted before taking the oath
19 March 1831	New Romney	u	Arthur Hill Trevor	Sir Roger Gresley	Resignation
21 March 1831	Nairnshire	u	George Pryse Campbell	George Pryse Campbell	Groom of the Bedchamber
23 March 1831	County Clare	c*	James Patrick Mahon	Maurice O'Connell	Void election
23 March 1831	Durham City	c*	Sir Roger Gresley	William Richard Carter Chaytor	Void election
2 April 1831	Londonderry City	c*	Sir Robert Ferguson	Sir Robert Ferguson	Void election
4 April 1831	Winchelsea	u*	Henry Dundas	Stephen Lushington	Resignation
6 April 1831	Malton	u*	Sir James Scarlett	Francis Jeffrey	Resignation
9 April 1831	Colchester	c*	Andrew Spottiswoode	William Mayhew	Void election
9 April 1831	Launceston	u*	Sir James Gordon	Sir John Malcolm	Resignation
16 April 1831	Queen's County	u*	Sir Henry Parnell	Sir Henry Parnell	Secretary at War
19 April 1831	Shaftesbury	u*	William Stratford Dugdale	William Leader Maberly	Resignation

=== 10th Parliament (1831–1832) ===
Date	Constituency	c/u	Former incumbent	Winner	Cause
12 July 1831	Newport (Cornwall)	u	Jonathan Raine	Viscount Grimston	Death
13 July 1831	Malton	u	Francis Jeffrey	William Cavendish	Chose to sit for Perth Burghs
13 July 1831	Reigate	u*	Sir Joseph Sydney Yorke	Charles Philip Yorke	Death
13 July 1831	Tavistock	u	Lord John Russell	John Heywood Hawkins	Chose to sit for Devon
14 July 1831	Higham Ferrers	u	Viscount Milton	Charles Christopher Pepys	Chose to sit for Northamptonshire
14 July 1831	Okehampton	u	William Henry Trant	Sir Richard Rawlinson Vyvyan	Resignation
15 July 1831	Milborne Port	u	Richard Lalor Sheil	Philip Cecil Crampton	Chose to sit for County Louth
15 July 1831	Westbury	u	Henry Hanmer	Henry Frederick Stephenson	Resignation
15 July 1831	Winchelsea	u*	Stephen Lushington	James Brougham	Chose to sit for Ilchester
16 July 1831	Cashel	u	Matthew Pennefather	Philip Pusey	Resignation
18 July 1831	Bletchingley	u	John George Brabazon Ponsonby	Thomas Hyde Villiers	Resignation
18 July 1831	Bletchingley	u	Charles Tennyson	The Viscount Palmerston	Chose to sit for Stamford
20 July 1831	Downton	u	James Brougham	Philip Pleydell Bouverie	Resignation to contest Winchelsea
22 July 1831	Bandon Bridge	u	Viscount Bernard	Sir Augustus William Clifford	Resignation
25 July 1831	Roscommon	u*	The O'Conor Don	The O'Conor Don	Death
1 August 1831	Weymouth and Melcombe Regis	c	Richard Weyland	Charles Baring Wall	Chose to sit for Oxfordshire
9 August 1831	Peeblesshire	u*	Sir George Montgomery	Sir John Hay	Death
10 August 1831	Great Grimsby	c	George Harris	Lord Loughborough	Void election
10 August 1831	Great Grimsby	c	John Villiers Shelley	Henry Fitzroy	Void election
11 August 1831	County Meath	c*	Sir Marcus Somerville	Henry Grattan	Death
15 August 1831	New Ross	u	Charles Tottenham	William Wigram	Resignation
18 August 1831	Dublin City	c	Louis Perrin	Viscount Ingestre	Void election
18 August 1831	Dublin City	c	Robert Harty	Frederick Shaw	Void election
25 August 1831	Armagh City	u	Viscount Ingestre	Sir John William Head Brydges	Resignation to contest Dublin City
25 August 1831	Carmarthen	c	Vacant	John Jones	No Election held due to riots
14 September 1831	Sutherland	u*	Sir Hugh Innes	Roderick Macleod	Death
21 September 1831	Wallingford	c	William Lewis Hughes	Thomas Charles Leigh	Elevated to the peerage
22 September 1831	Derbyshire	u	Lord George Cavendish	Lord Cavendish	Elevated to the peerage
22 September 1831	Flint Boroughs	u	Edward Pryce Lloyd	Henry Glynne	Elevated to the peerage
27 September 1831	County Wexford	u*	Arthur Chichester	Robert Shapland Carew	Elevated to the peerage
28 September 1831	County Louth	u	Alexander Dawson	Sir Patrick Bellew	Death
30 September 1831	Dorset	c*	John Calcraft	Lord Ashley	Death (suicide)
30 September 1831	Malton	u*	Lord Cavendish	Charles Christopher Pepys	Resignation to contest Derbyshire
3 October 1831	Forfarshire	c	William Maule	Donald Ogilvy May	Elevated to the peerage
3 October 1831	Forfarshire	c*	Donald Ogilvy May	Douglas Gordon Hallyburton	By-election result reversed on petition
6 October 1831	Higham Ferrers	u	Charles Christopher Pepys	John George Brabazon Ponsonby	Resignation to contest Malton
6 October 1831	Poole	c*	William Francis Spencer Ponsonby	Sir John Byng	Resignation
11 October 1831	Dorchester	u*	Lord Ashley	Anthony Henry Ashley Cooper	Resignation to contest Dorset
20 October 1831	Drogheda	u	John Henry North	Thomas Wallace	Death
21 October 1831	Liverpool	c*	John Evelyn Denison	Viscount Sandon	Chose to sit for Nottinghamshire
24 October 1831	Pembrokeshire	c*	Sir John Owen	Sir John Owen	Void election
25 October 1831	Tavistock	u	Lord Russell	Francis Russell	Resignation
1 November 1831	Cambridgeshire	c*	Lord Francis Godolphin Osborne	Richard Greaves Townley	Resignation
15 December 1831	Reigate	u	Charles Philip Yorke	Charles Philip Yorke	Resignation to contest Cambridgeshire
22 December 1831	Leominster	u*	Thomas Brayen	The Lord Hotham	Resignation
23 January 1832	Tewkesbury	u*	John Martin	Charles Hanbury Tracy	Death
2 February 1832	Dunwich	u	Earl of Brecknock	Viscount Lowther	Resignation
8 February 1832	Westminster	u*	Sir John Cam Hobhouse	Sir John Cam Hobhouse	Secretary at War
25 February 1832	Flint Boroughs	u*	Henry Glynne	Sir Stephen Richard Glynne	Resignation
25 February 1832	Tregony	c	Charles George James Arbuthnot	James Adam Gordon	Resignation
28 February 1832	Ennis	u	William Vesey FitzGerald	Sir Augustine Fitzgerald	Became an Irish Peer
3 March 1832	Great Marlow	u*	Owen Williams	William Robert Clayton	Death
5 March 1832	Ayr Burghs	u*	Thomas Francis Kennedy	Thomas Francis Kennedy	Clerk of the Ordnance
18 May 1832	Chester	c	Foster Cunliffe Offley	John Finchett Maddock	Death
24 May 1832	Appleby	u	Henry Tufton	Charles Henry Foster Barham	Succeed to a peerage
7 June 1832	Berkshire	c*	Charles Dundas	Robert Palmer	Elevated to the peerage
12 June 1832	Taunton	u*	Henry Labouchere	Henry Labouchere	Civil Lord of the Admiralty
13 June 1832	Calne	u*	Thomas Babington Macaulay	Thomas Babington Macaulay	Commissioner of the Board of Control
16 June 1832	Cricklade	u*	Robert Gordon	Robert Gordon	Commissioner of the Board of Control
22 June 1832	Hampshire	u	Sir James Macdonald	Sir Thomas Baring	Resignation (Lord High Commissioner of the Ionian Islands)
26 June 1832	Chipping Wycombe	c*	Sir Thomas Baring	Charles Grey	Resignation to contest Hampshire
28 June 1832	Knaresborough	u	James Mackintosh	William Francis Spencer Ponsonby	Death
31 July 1832	Winchelsea	u	James Brougham	James Brougham	Clerk of Patents and Registrar of Affidavits at the Court of Chancery
8 August 1832	County Tipperary	u	John Hely Hutchinson	Robert Otway Cave	Succeeded to a peerage
