= Ralph Sheldon (disambiguation) =

Ralph Sheldon was an English Royalist and antiquary.

Ralph Sheldon may also refer to:

- Ralph Sheldon (1537–1613), an MP for the Worcestershire (UK Parliament constituency)
- Ralph Sheldon, Prohibition Era gangster and bootlegging kingpin, Sheldon Gang
