= Abraham Moore =

English Member of Parliament

Member of the Parliament of England for Shaftesbury
- In office 6 March 1820 – 20 April 1822 Serving with Edward Harbord

Personal details
- Born: 2 July 1766
- Died: 1 November 1822 (aged 56) New York
- Education: Eton College
- Alma mater: King's College, Cambridge

Abraham Moore (2 July 1766 – 1 November 1822) was an English politician who served as a Member of Parliament (MP) for Shaftesbury.

== Biography ==
Moore was descended from a family of clergymen from Devon. Moore was educated at Eton College and at King's College, Cambridge. In the 1820 United Kingdom general election, he was elected for the constituency of Shaftesbury in Dorset. In 1822, he resigned his seat was replaced by Lord Robert Grosvenor. Later that year he and his wife both died of yellow fever in New York leaving six sons as orphans in poverty.

== See also ==
- List of MPs elected in the 1820 United Kingdom general election
- List of Stewards of the Chiltern Hundreds 1751–1849
