= Nathaniel William Peach =

English politician (1785–1835)

Member of Parliament for Corfe Castle
- In office 8 February 1828 – 3 December 1832 Serving with George Bankes

Personal details
- Born: 14 September 1785
- Died: 29 August 1835 (aged 49)
- Party: Tory

Nathaniel William Peach (14 September 1785 – 29 August 1835) was an English politician who was Member of Parliament for Corfe Castle.

He unsuccessfully contested East Norfolk at the 1832 general election.
