= Josias Alexander =

British politician (1771–1839)

Josias Du Pré Alexander (1771 – 20 August 1839) was an Irish-born officer of the British East India Company who sat in the House of Commons of the United Kingdom in two periods between 1820 and 1832.

Born in County Londonderry, Alexander joined the East India Company in 1796, and later became a private merchant in Calcutta. His time in India gained him huge wealth.

He returned to the United Kingdom in 1818, and bought an estate in Hampshire. In 1820, he and his brother James jointly purchased the rotten borough of Old Sarum from their cousin Du Pré Alexander, 2nd Earl of Caledon, and returned themselves to Parliament that year. With support of the Chancellor Nicholas Vansittart, 1st Baron Bexley, he was elected as a director of the East India Company, a post he held until 1838.

Parliament of the United Kingdom
Preceded by James Alexander; Arthur Johnston Crawford	Member of Parliament for Old Sarum; 1820–1828; With: James Alexander	Succeeded by James Alexander; Stratford Canning
Preceded by James Alexander; Stratford Canning	Member of Parliament for Old Sarum; 1830–1832; With: James Alexander	Constituency abolished
