= William Parnell-Hayes =

Irish politician

Member of Parliament for County Wicklow
- In office 12 August 1817 – 2 January 1821

Personal details
- Born: 1780
- Died: 2 January 1821 (aged 40 or 41)
- Children: John Parnell
- Parent: Sir John Parnell, 2nd Baronet (father)
- Education: Eton College; Trinity College, Cambridge

William Parnell-Hayes (c. 1780 – 2 January 1821) was an Irish politician. He was Member of Parliament for County Wicklow from 1817 until his death.

== Early life and education ==
Third son of Sir John Parnell, 2nd Baronet, and Letitia Charlotte, daughter of Sir Arthur Brooke, 1st baronet, William Parnell was educated at Eton College and Trinity College, Cambridge.

== Personal life ==
In 1810, Parnell-Hayes married Frances, daughter of the politician Hon. Hugh Howard. He adopted the additional surname of 'Hayes' in 1801 on succeeding his father to the estate at Avondale House, which had previously been the property of politician Samuel Hayes.
