= Thomas Divett =

English politician (1769 – 1828)

Member of Parliament for Lymington
- In office 9 July 1827 – 31 July 1828

Member of Parliament for Gatton
- In office 9 March 1820 – 9 June 1826

Personal details
- Born: 3 March 1769
- Died: 16 July 1828 (aged 59)

Thomas Divett (3 March 1769 – 16 July 1828) was an English politician who was Member of Parliament (MP) for Gatton and Lymington.
