= Ralph Sheldon (1537–1613) =

C16 gentry Catholic sympathizer

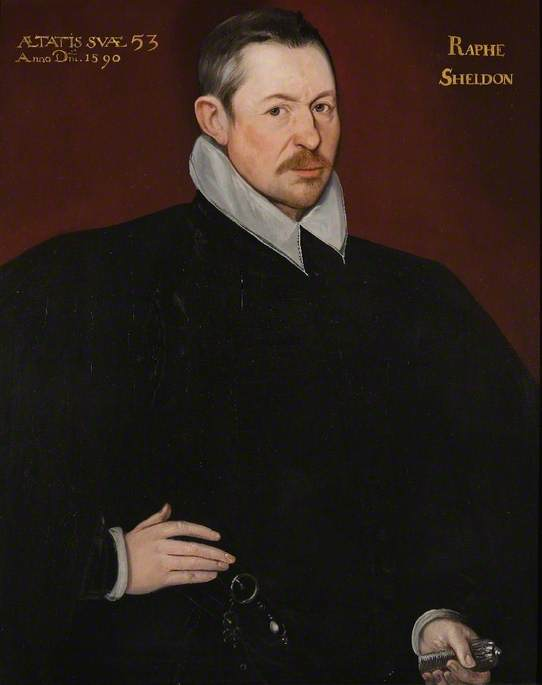
- Portrait of Ralph Sheldon dated 1590
- Born: 1537
- Died: March 31, 1613

Ralph Sheldon (born 1537-1613) was a member of parliament, justice of the peace and one-term sheriff of Worcestershire. Once considered a staunch Catholic, in modern times he has been described as a 'Church Papist'.

He owned extensive lands in the county and in Gloucester-, Oxford- and Warwickshire together with salt bullaries (salt works) at Droitwich and coal diggings in Leicestershire.

== Early life and education ==
Ralph Sheldon was born in 1537 to the upwardly mobile William Sheldon of Beoley, Worcestershire, and his wife Mary, daughter of William Willington of Barcheston, Warwickshire, Merchant of the Staple. Ralph served as MP, JP and one-term sheriff of Worcestershire.

In November 1556 he was enrolled at the Middle Temple, one of the four inns of Court in London, to embark on at least some part of a legal training.

== Public service ==
After Queen Elizabeth's accession in November 1558 both William and Ralph helped Robert Dudley, created earl of Leicester in 1564, to regain the forfeit Dudley lands in Warwickshire, no doubt in the hope of future links to and favours from a rising man already close to the monarch. Ralph's increasing leaning towards the Old Faith eventually cost him Leicester's support.

Ralph served as an MP at least in the first session of the first parliament of the reign (January-Easter 1563), but possibly not in the second (September-Christmas 1566). When his father died at Skilts in December 1570 Ralph organized a funeral procession to Beoley headed by the herald Clarenceux King of Arms, Sir Robert Cooke, who had granted the family the right to a coat of arms. His presence was a mark of respect and an indication of the family's local status in Worcestershire and Warwickshire. Ralph inherited estates at Beoley, Skilts and in the hinterland of Evesham, Worcestershire; in Barcheston, Brailes and Long Compton in Warwickshire and extensive holdings up the valley of the Kneebrook stream south of Chipping Campden, Gloucestershire. He also inherited houses at Beoley, Skilts, a building of some sort at Weston in Long Compton together with apartments within the liberty of the former Whitefriars site in London. He was appointed JP in Worcestershire in 1572; he served until 1587 when, like many others in the anxious months spent in fear of Spanish attack, he was removed from the bench on account of his wife's recusancy – her refusal to attend services in a parish church.

== Relations with State and Church ==
Panicked by the landing in June 1580 of two English Jesuits, Robert Persons and Edmund Campion, sent with papal approval to reassure English Catholics, the Privy Council summoned some fifty men to present themselves in London in mid-August. All were prominent in their counties, most were known or suspected sympathizers of the Old Faith. Amongst them was Ralph Sheldon. The Council's intention was that they 'should be reformed'. After questioning Ralph was immediately detained in the Marshalsea prison on London's south bank, released after two months on a plea of serious illness made by his wife and moved into house arrest with the Dean of Westminster, Gabriel Goodman. Two months later, on January 8, 1581, he stood before the Council and undertook to attend services in his parish church. He also swore allegiance to the Queen. Except for Thomas, Lord Paget, the others remained in custody until May 1581, released only on punitive restrictions.

His loyalty remained true. Ralph avoided entanglement in all the major plots of the 1580s against Queen Elizabeth, those of John Somerville and of Francis Throckmorton in 1583, both relatives, and of Anthony Babington in 1586. He was not questioned in connection with the arrest of the priest Hugh Hall who confessed to having resided in a Sheldon property in the later 1570s. High-handed behaviour in the parish of Tredington, where he held the right to appoint the incumbent (the advowson), led to the only formal charge of recusancy Ralph experienced. The case was heard at Worcester Assizes in September 1587. One of the Judges 'persuaded' an unwilling jury to convict him. Sheldon became liable to pay the fines for recusancy. Payment was recorded for only three years, the sole occasion on which the penalty was imposed. They totalled £780.

Later it was said that the Lord Chancellor, Christopher Hatton, had quashed the charge against him.

In 1594 information about a plot to kill the Queen and put the Earl of Derby on the throne reached the Privy Council, the fourth in the same year. The instigators, soldiers in the English armies in the Low Countries, hoped that Sheldon would act as their financier. Once again he was summoned before the Privy Council for interrogation, questioned at least three times and by several inquisitors as the surviving papers reveal. That he should be the financial backer was dismissed almost immediately; the Council was more interested in his links to Catholics living abroad and with those at home. His house was searched for incriminating books and papers and his servants questioned. When the case was dismissed Sheldon went free. No penalties were imposed; no further entries on the Recusant Rolls support the statement that recusancy fines were imposed.

Another near brush with the law occurred in 1603 when the priest William Watson, architect of the Bye Plot against the new king, James VI, mentioned Sheldon's name in a provisional list of those who would replace the existing ministers. A letter to his nephew Francis Plowden, intercepted by an alarmed local official, again brought Sheldon to the notice of the authorities, without consequences. Ralph had no involvement in the Gunpowder Plot of 1605.

Even against this background Ralph was active in two Worcestershire parliamentary elections at this time. In 1601 the Privy Council warned him against interference. In 1604 he clearly made an attempt to wrong-foot the government's preferred choice.

== Declining years ==
In his will Sheldon expressed burning resentment of ill treatment by the man from whom he had borrowed heavily over a period of eight years. The circumstances have been untangled by the testimony from documents not previously read recited in the case brought against him and his creditor, Thomas Horde of Cote, Oxfordshire, by Sir Edward Coke, Attorney General, in 1606. Described recently as 'an upmarket money lender', Horde foreclosed suddenly around 1599, leaving Sheldon with a debt Horde reckoned as £24,000, the sum due if the borrower defaulted on a recognizance (bond) but not the sum borrowed. At most Sheldon had received no more than £12,000. On the grounds that Horde was a convicted Catholic and should have paid fines since 1592 Coke claimed the money for the Crown, leaving Sheldon to pay. His lands were temporarily taken into administration by royal officials but were returned when the debt had been cleared, shortly before his death in March 1613.

Ralph was buried at night in the chapel he had added to the north side of Beoley parish church alongside his first wife in the still surviving tomb he had built for her. They had ten children, only one, Edward (1561–1643) male. With one exception, his daughters made good marriages. His own second marriage, in 1604, to the much married Jane de la Warr, most recently Lady Tasburgh, was unsuccessful. He bequeathed a silver basin, the lid engraved with their arms, to each of his surviving sons in law, resolved a number of family disputes and asked those involved in the matter of his debt who had not yet cancelled their bonds to comply with the court order to do so. Bequests were made to loyal members of his household, his secretary Robert Jones and his lawyer, John Bould, and to close friends, Mr Thomas Allen, fellow of Gloucester College, Oxford and Mr Dr Anthony Blencowe, Fellow and sometime Provost of Oriel College. His second wife was to be paid only £100.

== Private life ==
He married Anne daughter of Sir Robert Throckmorton of Coughton Court, Warwickshire on May 23, 1557 in the church of St Andrew, Holborn, London.

Ralph built the fourth largest house in Elizabethan Warwickshire on the hill overlooking the deserted hamlet of Weston in Long Compton; work began in 1586. Henry Beighton's drawing of 1716 shows a three-storey courtyard house; it survived until 1827. One of the panelled reception rooms was decorated with a frieze of portrait heads, seven surviving. His portrait by the Flemish artist Hieronimo Custodis hangs in Warwick Museum, opposite the most complete of the four tapestry maps he commissioned, Warwickshire. In each of the focal counties he had lands, friends and influence. The remaining sections of the other three which showed Worcestershire, Oxfordshire (which stretched as far as London!) and Gloucestershire are now owned by the Bodleian Library, University of Oxford to which he made a donation of £50 towards construction of Sir Thomas Bodley's buildings forming the Old Library Quadrangle.

== Contemporary opinion ==
One of the Queen's courtiers, Sir John Harington of Kelston, Somerset, remarked that he had heard it said that Ralph was one of the sufficientest wisest men, fittest to have been made one of the Council but for one matter. It was also recorded, however, that some regarded him as 'an unthrift' who would have lost all his lands in gaming within these two years 'if he had not had faire play played him'. The Worcestershire historian Thomas Habington writing several years after Ralph's death remarked that 'Ralph deserved for his singular parts of mind which flowed from his tongue and pen a pre-eminent dignity'. By those pitted against him in the law courts he was more often described as being 'well friended. He was, however, generous to those in financial need.

== Modern opinion ==
Ralph Sheldon divided opinion in his own lifetime as he still does today. His image as a staunch Catholic was formed by the earliest biographical notes of 1915, reinforced by research in the 1960s. Since then the simple division of England's population into two opposing groups of Protestant and Catholic has been reconsidered and dramatically altered by the work of Professor Walsham. Her rediscovery of the Elizabethan term 'Church Papist' describing the lukewarm attender at the parish church introduced the view that co-existence, not necessarily happy, between those whose preference lay with the Old Faith and those willing to hear the new Protestant services of the 'Church of England as by law established' was more widespread than previously understood. Even if Ralph preferred the old rites occasional attendance at his parish church would give him protection against the full force of the law.

Active in the London law courts, visible in his neighbourhood and amongst his family and their friends Ralph was 'no hidden man', as he himself said. Seen outside the context of government records, focussed inevitably on his potential infringements against the State, his private life should not be seen as differing greatly from that of his Protestant neighbour.

== Bibliography ==
- Adams, Simon, 'Because I am of this Countrye and Mynde to plant myself there': the Earl of Leicester and the West Midlands', Midland History, vol. 20 1995, pp. 1–74, reprinted in Adams, Leicester and the Court, Manchester University Press, 2002
- Bannerman, John Wainewright, (ed), 'Two Lists of supposed adherents of Mary Queen of Scots, 1574 and 1582', Miscellany viii, Catholic Record Society, 13 (1913), pp. 86–142 at 98-99.
- Barnard, E.A.B., Miscellaneous Papers deposited in Birmingham Archives
- Barnard, E.A.B., The Sheldons, Cambridge, 1936
- Bindoff, S. T, (ed.), The History of Parliament: the House of Commons 1509-1558, 3 vols, London 1981
- John Bossy, The English Catholic Community, 1570–1850, London, 1975
- Bowler, H., and McCann, T.J., (eds), Recusants in the Exchequer Pipe Rolls 1582-1592, Catholic Record Society, vol. 71, 1986
- Brown, Nancy Pollard, 'Paperchase : the dissemination of Catholic pamphlets in England', English Manuscript Studies, I (1989), 120-143
- Bryson, W. H., (ed), Cases concerning Equity and the Courts of Equity 1550-1660, Selden Society vols 117,118, 2000–02
- Burke, Vincent, 'Submissions of Conformity by Elizabethan Recusants in Worcestershire', Worcestershire Recusant, vol. 22 (1973), pp. 1–7
- Calendar of the Cecil Papers in Hatfield House, 13 vols, HMSO: London, 1883-1976
- Calendar of State Papers, Domestic Series, 12 vols 1547-1625, ed R. Lemon and M. A. E. Green, London 1856-72
- Dasent, John R., ed., Acts of the Privy Council, 45 vols, London: HMSO, 1890-1964
- Daunt, Catherine (2015) Portrait sets in Tudor and Jacobean England. Doctoral thesis (PhD), University of Sussex, 2 vols
- Davidson, Alan, 'The Recusancy of Ralph Sheldon', Worcester Recusant 12 December 1968: 1–7
- Davidson, Alan, 'The Second Mrs Sheldon', Worcester Recusant, vol. 14 December 1969, pp. 15–21
- Donno, E.S., Harington's Metamorphosis of Ajax, London 1962
- Dugdale, William, The Antiquities of Warwickshire, 2 volumes, 1730 edition
- Edwards, Francis., Plots and Plotters, Dublin, 2002
- Edwards, Francis, The succession, bye and main plots of 1601-1603, Four Courts Press Dublin, 2006
- Habington, Thomas, A Survey of Worcestershire, ed. John Amphlett, Worcester Historical Society, 2 vols., 1895 & 1899
- Harley, J., The World of William Byrd: Musicians, Merchants and Magnates, Ashgate Publishing, Farnham, 2010
- Hasler, P. W., Members of the House of Commons 1558-1603, London, HMSO,1981; available on-line, History of Parliament
- Hotson, Leslie, I, William Shakespeare, Jonathan Cape, London 1937
- Hume, Martin A.S., Treason and Plot; struggles for Catholic supremacy in the last years of Elizabeth, 1901
- Jones. Norman, God and the Moneylenders, Oxford, 1989
- Macray, W. D., Annals of the Bodleian Library, 2nd edition only, 1890
- Martin, Patrick H., Elizabethan Espionage: plotters and spies in the struggle between Catholicism and the Crown, Jefferson, North Carolina, 2016
- Neale, J. E., The Elizabethan House of Commons, London 1949
- Parry, Glynn, 'Catholicism and Tyranny in Shakespeare's Warwickshire' in (ed) R Malcolm Smuts, The Oxford Handbook of the Age of Shakespeare, Oxford, 2016
- Questier, Michael, Conversion, Politics and Religion 1580-1625, Cambridge University Press, 1996
- Sturgess, H.A.C., (ed) Register of Admissions to the Honourable Society of the Middle Temple, 3 vols, London 1949
- Scott-Warren, Jason, Sir John Harington and the Book as Gift, OUP 2001
- Stopes, C.C., Shakespeare's Warwickshire Contemporaries, Shakespeare Head Press, Stratford upon Avon, first edition 1897, second edition now on-line
- Strong, Roy, 'Elizabethan Painting: An approach through Inscriptions - II: Hieronimo Custodis', Burlington Magazine, vol 105, March 1963, pp. 103–108
- Strype, J., Annals of the Reformation, London, 1725-28 edition, 4 vols
- Thrush, Andrew, House of Commons, 1604-1629, Benjamin Coate in vol.2, pp. 455–58.
- Trimble, W. R., The Catholic laity in Elizabethan England, 1558–1603, Cambridge, Harvard University Press, 1964
- Turner, Hilary L., 'Cloaked in conformity?', British Catholic History, volume 34(4) 2019, pp 562–584, available on-line, institutional access.
- Turner, Hilary L., The Sheldon Tapestry Maps Belonging to the Bodleian Library, The Bodleian Library Record, Vol. 17, No. 5, pp 293–313, April 2002 https://doi.org/10.3828/blr.2002.17.5.293
- Turner, Hilary L., 'In Stately View': Ralph Sheldon's Tapestry Map of Gloucestershire' The Bodleian Library Record, Vol. 31, No. 1-2, pp 31–46, April 2018
- Turner, Hilary L., 'Weston Pallace, the Sheldon family's house at Weston in Long Compton, Warwickshire: an attempted reconstruction', Warwickshire History, volume xix, number 2, Winter 2023-24, pp. 69–91
- Turner, Hilary L., No Mean Prospect: Ralph Sheldon's Tapestry Maps, Plotwood Press, 2010
- Turner, Hilary L., But for One Matter: Ralph Sheldon 1537-1613, available at https://ralphsheldon1537-1613.info
- Victoria County History Worcestershire, Beoley parish, volume 4, ed. William Page, 1924 , available on-line
- Wainewright, John Bannerman, (ed) 'Two Lists of supposed adherents of Mary Queen of Scots, 1574 and 1582', Miscellany viii, Catholic Record Society, vol. 13 1913, pp. 86–142
- Walsham, Church papists: Catholicism, conformity and confessional polemic in early modern England, Woodbridge, 1999
- Warriner, Michael, A Prospect of Weston in Warwickshire, Roundwood Press, Kineton, 1978
- Wood, Anthony, ed. A Clarke, The Life and Times of Anthony Wood, 7 volumes, Oxford Historical Society, 1892.
