= Sir Peter Pole, 2nd Baronet =

Sir Peter Pole 2nd Baronet

Member of Parliament for Yarmouth, Isle of Wight
- In office 1819–1826
- Preceded by: John Taylor

Personal details
- Born: 1770 London, England
- Died: 1850 (aged 79–80)
- Spouse: Anna Guilhelmina Buller (m. 1798)
- Occupation: Banker and politician
- Known for: Prominent figure of the panic of 1825

Sir Peter Pole, 2nd Baronet (1770–1850) was an English banker and politician, Member of Parliament for Yarmouth, Isle of Wight from 1819 to 1826.

== Life ==
He was the eldest son of Sir Charles Pole, 1st Baronet of Wolverton (originally Charles Van Notten), a London banker, and his wife Millicent Pole, daughter of Charles Pole (1695–1779). His paternal grandfather Charles Van Notten (1702–1750) of Amsterdam moved to London in 1720 and married Susanna Bosanquet.

Sir Peter Pole succeeded his father in 1813. He and his brother Charles had worked in the family Van Notten Bank of Devonshire Square, Bishopsgate since 1795, and the bank came to trade as Peter and Charles Van Notten and Co. In 1815, Pole became a partner in another bank, Down, Thornton & Free of Birchin Lane off Lombard Street.

Keen to enter Parliament, Pole through his partner Peter Free consulted James Brogden about obtaining a pocket borough. He stood unsuccessfully for Tregony in 1818. When John Taylor resigned his Yarmouth seat in 1819, Pole took it on, the patron Sir Leonard Thomas Worsley-Holmes, 9th Baronet already having a seat.

Pole was a prominent figure of the panic of 1825, the family bank Peter and Charles Van Notten and Co. failing in December 1825. His personal fortune was largely unaffected, but he withdrew from politics in 1826.

Sir Peter Pole & Co acted as the London agents for a number of provincial or country banks. The Bath bank Cavenagh, Browne, Bayly & Browne went bankrupt in the banking crisis that followed Pole suspending payments in 1825.

== Family ==
Pole married in 1798 Anna Guilhelmina Buller, whose Portuguese middle name is variously spelled.
