= James Bradshaw (MP for Brackley) =

British politician (1786–1833)

James Bradshaw (15 April 1786 - 18 September 1833) was a Member of Parliament for the constituency of Brackley from 1825 to 1832.

Bradshaw, born on 15 April 1786, was the second son of Robert Haldane Bradshaw MP. He joined the Royal Navy in 1805, becoming a commander in the following year and a captain in 1808. In 1809, he commanded the Eurydice during the capture of Martinique. In 1825, he became the MP for Brackley alongside his father, who had been the MP for this constituency since 1802. The pair remained joint MPs there until it was disenfranchised in 1832.

In 1833, he was living in Runcorn. On 18 September of that year he was found dead at his father's residence, Worsley Hall. He had killed himself with a razor. An inquest into his death was told that he had been suffering from ill-health since his time in the navy, especially violent fits of indigestion for which he would take large doses of medication without any medical advice. The inquest jury returned a verdict of insanity. He left a wife, two sons and two daughters.
