= Henry St Paul =

English officer in the British Army and politician

Henry Heneage St Paul (16 March 1777 – 1 November 1820) was an English officer in the British Army and a politician.

St Paul was the second son of Horace St Paul of Ewart Park, in Northumberland. His father held the title of Count St Paul of the Austrian Empire. His mother Anne was the daughter of Henry Weston of Surrey. His older brother was Sir Horace St Paul, Bt.

Educated at Eton, he was commissioned as an ensign in the 60th Foot in 1802, but preferred managing his father's estates and was on half-pay from the army by 1803.

He was elected at the 1812 general election as a Member of Parliament (MP) for the borough of Berwick-upon-Tweed in Northumberland, and re-elected in 1818. At the 1820 general election he was defeated by Sir David Milne, but that result was reversed on petition in July 1820, and St Paul was re-elected later the same month without a contest.

However, he died on 1 November, age 43, before he could resume his seat. His death triggered a by-election which was contested by the Scottish Tory nabob James Balfour and the Whig baronet Sir Francis Blake. It was narrowly won by Blake.

Parliament of the United Kingdom
Preceded by Alexander Allan; Sir Alexander Lockhart, Bt	Member of Parliament for Berwick-upon-Tweed; 1812 – March 1820; With: Alexander Allan	Succeeded by Lord Ossulston; Sir David Milne
Preceded by Lord Ossulston; David Milne	Member of Parliament for Berwick-upon-Tweed; July 1820 – December 1820; With: Lord Ossulston	Succeeded by Lord Ossulston; Sir Francis Blake, Bt
