= John Bond (1802–1844) =

British politician

John Bond (1 January 1802 – 18 March 1844) was a British politician. He was the Tory Member of Parliament for Corfe Castle, 1823–1828. He resigned from Parliament on 8 February 1828, accepting the Stewardship of the Chiltern Hundreds. He was then the High Sheriff of Dorset 1830 to 1831.
