= Ross Mahon =

Sir Ross Mahon, 1st Baronet (1763–1835), of Castlegar, Co. Galway, was a Member of the Parliament of Ireland 1798-1800, and an Irish Member of Parliament for Ennis in 1820.

Baronetage of the United Kingdom
New creation	Baronet (of Castlegar); 1819–1935	Succeeded by Ross Mahon
