= James Somers Cocks =

James Somers Cocks (9 January 1790 – 5 July 1856) was the member of parliament for Reigate from 1818 to 1823.
