= Arthur Johnston Crawford =

English politician

Member of Parliament
- In office 1818–1820
- Constituency: Old Sarum

Personal details
- Born: 1786
- Died: 13 October 1826 (aged 39–40)
- Education: Trinity College, Dublin; Lincoln's Inn

Arthur Johnston Crawford (1786 – 13 October 1826) was an English politician who sat as MP for Old Sarum from 1818 till 4 July 1820.

He was the son of John Crawford and Maria (née Kennedy). He was educated at Trinity College, Dublin in 1802 and Lincoln's Inn in 1806.
