= List of MPs elected in the 1826 United Kingdom general election =

1826–1830 Parliament of the United Kingdom
←	1820–1826 Parliament	1830–1831 Parliament	→
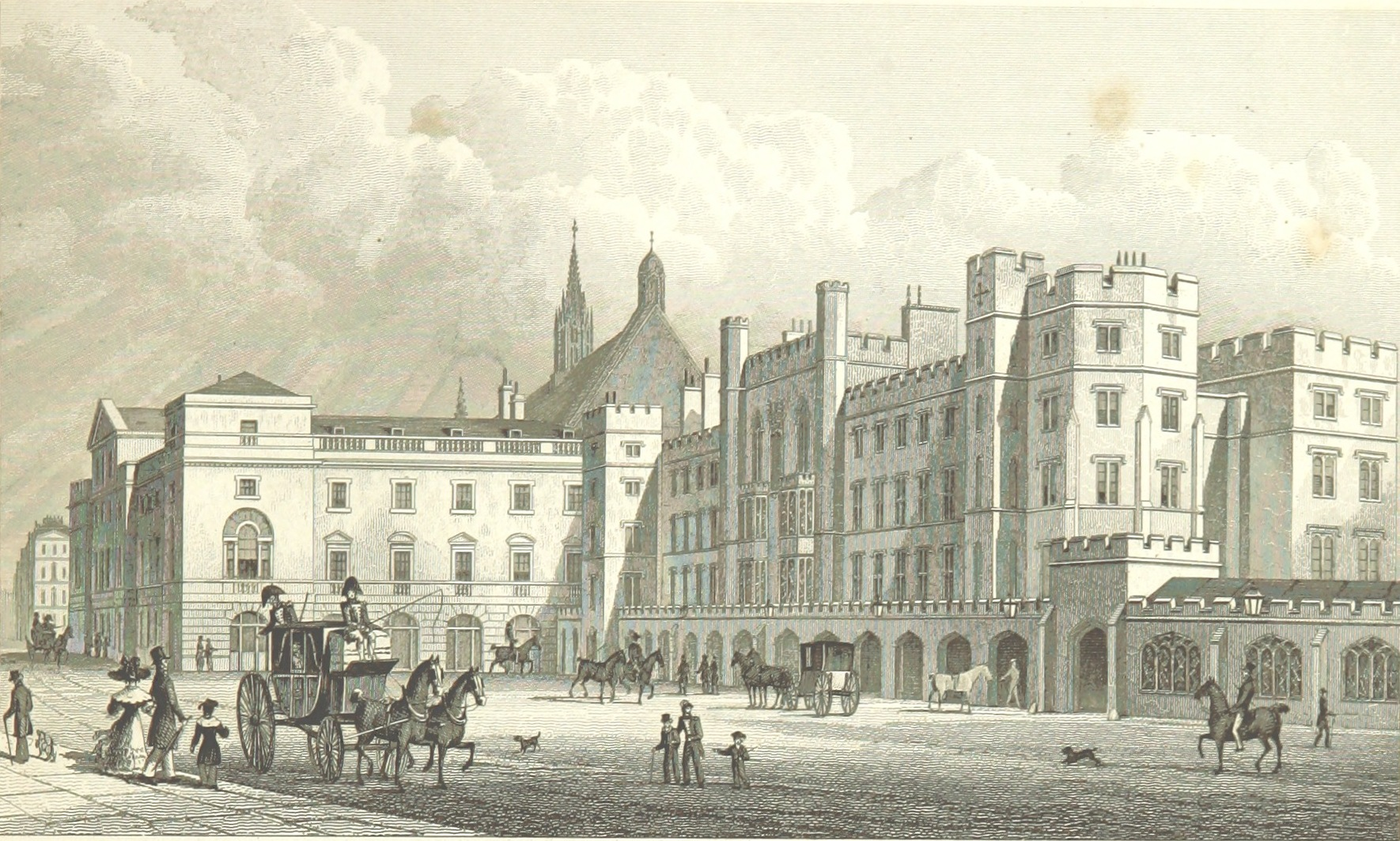
- The Palace of Westminster in 1828

Overview
- Legislative body: Parliament of the United Kingdom
- Jurisdiction: United Kingdom
- Meeting place: Palace of Westminster
- Term: 14 November 1826 – 4 June 1830
- Election: 1826 United Kingdom general election

Crown-in-Parliament George IV

Sessions
- 1st: 14 November 1826 – 2 July 1827
- 2nd: 29 January 1828 – 28 July 1828
- 3rd: 5 February 1829 – 24 June 1829
- 4th: 4 February 1830 – 4 June 1830

This is a list of MPs elected to the House of Commons at the 1826 United Kingdom general election, arranged by constituency. The Parliament was summoned 3 June 1826, assembled 25 July 1826 (prorogued until 14 November) and dissolved 24 July 1830. Initially, the Prime Minister was the leader of the Tories, the Earl of Liverpool.

Table of contents:

A B C D E F G H I K L M N O P Q R S T W Y Changes

== A ==
Constituency	MP	Party	
Aberdeen Burghs	Joseph Hume	Whig	
Aberdeenshire	William Gordon	Tory	
Abingdon	John Maberly	Whig	
Aldborough (two members)	Clinton James Fynes Clinton	Tory	
Aldborough (two members)	Sir Alexander Grant, Bt	Tory	
Aldeburgh (two members)	John Wilson Croker (Note: Vacated seat and replaced 22 May 1827.)	Tory	
Aldeburgh (two members)	Joshua Walker	Tory	
Amersham (two members)	William Tyrwhitt-Drake	Tory	
Amersham (two members)	Thomas Tyrwhitt-Drake	Tory	
Andover (two members)	Sir John Pollen	Tory	
Andover (two members)	Thomas Assheton Smith II	Tory	
Anglesey	The Earl of Uxbridge	Whig	
Anstruther Burghs	James Balfour	Tory	
Antrim (two members)	Hon. John O'Neill	Tory	
Antrim (two members)	Edmond Alexander MacNaghten	Tory	
Appleby (two members)	Hon. Henry Tufton	Whig	
Appleby (two members)	Viscount Maitland	Tory	
Argyllshire	Walter Frederick Campbell	Whig	
Armagh	Rt Hon. Henry Goulburn	Tory	
County Armagh (two members)	Hon. Henry Caulfeild	Whig	
County Armagh (two members)	Charles Brownlow	Whig	
Arundel (two members)	Edward Lombe	Whig	
Arundel (two members)	John Atkins	Tory	
Ashburton (two members)	Sir Lawrence Vaughan Palk	Tory	
Ashburton (two members)	William Sturges Bourne	Tory	
Athlone	Richard Handcock	Tory	
Aylesbury (two members)	The Lord Nugent	Whig	
Aylesbury (two members)	William Rickford	Whig	
Ayr	Thomas Francis Kennedy	Whig	
Ayrshire	James Montgomerie		
== B ==
Constituency	MP	Party	
Banbury	Arthur Legge		
Bandon	John Ponsonby, Viscount Duncannon (Note: Sat for Kilkenny and replaced 19 December 1826 by Lord John Russell.)	Whig	
Banffshire	James Duff (Note: Replaced on Petition 2 April 1827 by John Morison.)		
Barnstaple (two members)	Frederick Hodgson		
Barnstaple (two members)	Henry Alexander		
Bath (two members)	Lord John Thynne		
Bath (two members)	Earl of Brecknock		
Beaumaris	Sir Robert Williams, Bt		
Bedford (two members)	Lord George Russell	Whig	
Bedford (two members)	William Henry Whitbread	Whig	
Bedfordshire (two members)	Marquess of Tavistock	Whig	
Bedfordshire (two members)	Thomas Potter Macqueen	Tory	
Belfast	Earl of Belfast	Tory	
Bere Alston (two members)	Percy Ashburnham		
Bere Alston (two members)	Lord Lovaine		
Berkshire (two members)	Robert Palmer	Tory	
Berkshire (two members)	Charles Dundas, 1st Baron Amesbury	Whig	
Berwickshire	Anthony Maitland, 10th Earl of Lauderdale	Tory	
Berwick-upon-Tweed (two members)	Marcus Beresford		
Berwick-upon-Tweed (two members)	Sir John Gladstone (Note: Election declared void. Replaced in by-election 29 March 1827.)	Tory	
Beverley (two members)	John Stewart	Tory	
Beverley (two members)	Charles Harrison Batley	Tory	
Bewdley	Wilson Aylesbury Roberts	Tory	
Bishop's Castle (two members)	William Holmes	Tory	
Bishop's Castle (two members)	Edward Rogers		
Bletchingley (two members)	William Russell (Note: Vacated seat and replaced 7 May 1827 by Hon William Lamb.)	Whig	
Bletchingley (two members)	Charles Tennyson	Whig	
Bodmin (two members)	Horace Seymour		
Bodmin (two members)	Davies Giddy later Gilbert		
Boroughbridge (two members)	Captain George Mundy	Tory	
Boroughbridge (two members)	Lt-Col Henry Dawkins	Tory	
Bossiney (two members)	John Stuart-Wortley-Mackenzie	Tory	
Bossiney (two members)	Edward Rose Tunno	Tory	
Boston (two members)	Gilbert John Heathcote	Whig	
Boston (two members)	Neil Malcolm		
Brackley (two members)	James Bradshaw	Tory	
Brackley (two members)	Robert Haldane Bradshaw	Tory	
Bramber (two members)	John Irving		
Bramber (two members)	Frederick Gough-Calthorpe		
Brecon	George Gould Morgan	Tory	
Breconshire	Thomas Wood	Tory	
Bridgnorth (two members)	William Wolryche-Whitmore		
Bridgnorth (two members)	Thomas Whitmore		
Bridgwater (two members)	William Thornton Astell		
Bridgwater (two members)	Charles Kemeys Kemeys Tynte	Whig	
Bridport (two members)	Henry Warburton	Radical	
Bridport (two members)	Sir Horace St Paul, Bt		
Bristol (two members)	Richard Hart Davis	Tory	
Bristol (two members)	Henry Bright	Whig	
Buckingham (two members)	Sir George Nugent, Bt		
Buckingham (two members)	William Henry Fremantle (Note: Vacated seat and replaced 23 May 1827 by Sir Thomas Francis Fremantle.)		
Buckinghamshire (two members)	Marquess of Chandos	Tory	
Buckinghamshire (two members)	Robert Smith	Whig	
Bury St Edmunds (two members)	Earl Jermyn	Tory	
Bury St Edmunds (two members)	Earl of Euston		
Buteshire	no return - alternating constituency with Caithness		
== C ==
Constituency	MP	Party	
Caernarvon	Lord William Paget	Whig	
Caernarvonshire	Sir Thomas Wynn		
Caithness	James Sinclair		
Callington (two members)	Matthias Attwood	Whig	
Callington (two members)	Alexander Baring	Whig	
Calne (two members)	Sir James Macdonald, Bt		
Calne (two members)	Hon. James Abercrombie	Whig	
Cambridge (two members)	Frederick Trench	Tory	
Cambridge (two members)	Marquess of Graham	Tory	
Cambridge University (two members)	Sir John Singleton Copley	Tory	
Cambridge University (two members)	The 3rd Viscount Palmerston	Whig	
Cambridgeshire (two members)	Henry John Adeane		
Cambridgeshire (two members)	Lord Francis Godolphin		
Camelford (two members)	Mark Milbank	Whig	
Camelford (two members)	Sheldon Cradock	Whig	
Canterbury (two members)	Lord Clifton	Whig	
Canterbury (two members)	Stephen Rumbold Lushington	Tory	
Cardiff	Lord Patrick Crichton-Stuart		
Cardigan	Pryse Pryse	Whig	
Cardiganshire	William Edward Powell	Tory	
Carlisle (two members)	Sir Philip Musgrave (Note: Died and replaced 16 August 1827 by James Law Lushington.)	Tory	
Carlisle (two members)	Sir James Graham (Note: Vacated seat and replaced 18 February 1829 by Sir William Scott.)	Whig	
Carlow	Lord Tullamore	Tory	
County Carlow (two members)	Thomas Kavanagh	Tory	
County Carlow (two members)	Henry Bruen	Tory	
Carmarthen	John Jones		
Carmarthenshire	Hon. George Rice-Trevor	Tory	
Carrickfergus	Sir Arthur Chichester	Tory	
Cashel	Ebenezer John Collett	Tory	
Castle Rising (two members)	Lord William Cholmondeley	Tory	
Castle Rising (two members)	Fulk Greville Howard	Tory	
Cavan (two members)	Henry Maxwell	Tory	
Cavan (two members)	Alexander Saunderson	Tory	
Cheshire (two members)	Davies Davenport		
Cheshire (two members)	Wilbraham Egerton	Tory	
Chester (two members)	Viscount Belgrave	Tory	
Chester (two members)	Lord Robert Grosvenor	Whig	
Chichester (two members)	Lord John Lennox	Whig	
Chichester (two members)	William Stephen Poyntz		
Chippenham (two members)	Ebenezer Fuller Maitland		
Chippenham (two members)	Frederick Gye		
Christchurch (two members)	George Pitt Rose		
Christchurch (two members)	Sir George Henry Rose	Tory	
Cirencester (two members)	Joseph Cripps	Tory	
Cirencester (two members)	Lord Apsley	Tory	
Clackmannanshire	no return - alternating constituency with Kinross-shire		
Clare (two members)	William Vesey-Fitzgerald (Note: Appointed to Crown office and replaced 5 July 1828 by Daniel O'Connell.)	Tory	
Clare (two members)	Lucius O'Brien	Tory	
Clitheroe (two members)	Hon. Peregrine Cust	Tory	
Clitheroe (two members)	Hon. Robert Curzon	Tory	
Clonmel	James Hewitt Massy Dawson (Note: Vacated seat and replaced 22 February 1830 by Eyre Coote.)	Tory	
Clyde Burghs	See Glasgow Burghs		
Cockermouth (two members)	Viscount Garlies	Tory	
Cockermouth (two members)	William Wilson Carus Wilson (Note: Vacated seat and replaced 16 February 1827 by Laurence Peel.)	Tory	
Colchester (two members)	Daniel Whittle Harvey	Radical	
Colchester (two members)	Sir George Smyth	Tory	
Coleraine	Sir John William Head Brydges	Tory	
Corfe Castle (two members)	John Bond (Note: Vacated seat and replaced 8 February 1828 by Nathaniel William Peach.)	Tory	
Corfe Castle (two members)	George Bankes	Tory	
Cork City (two members)	Sir Nicholas Conway Colthurst, Bt	Tory	
Cork City (two members)	Christopher Hely Hutchinson (Note: Died and replaced 29 December 1826 by his son John Hely Hutchinson.)	Whig	
County Cork (two members)	Hon. Robert King	Whig	
County Cork (two members)	Viscount Ennismore (Note: Died and replaced 4 December 1827 by the Hon. John Boyle.)		
Cornwall (two members)	Edward William Wynne Pendarves	Whig	
Cornwall (two members)	Sir Richard Rawlinson Vyvyan, Bt	Tory	
Coventry (two members)	Richard Edensor Heathcote		
Coventry (two members)	Thomas Bilcliffe Fyler		
Cricklade (two members)	Joseph Pitt		
Cricklade (two members)	Robert Gordon	Whig	
Cromartyshire	Duncan Davidson		
Cumberland (two members)	John Christian Curwen	Whig	
Cumberland (two members)	John Lowther	Tory	
== D ==
Constituency	MP	Party	
Dartmouth	Sir John Hutton Cooper		
Denbigh Boroughs	Frederick Richard West	Tory	
Denbighshire	Sir Watkin Williams-Wynn		
Derby (two members)	Henry Frederick Compton Cavendish	Whig	
Derby (two members)	Edward Strutt	Whig	
Derbyshire (two members)	Lord George Cavendish	Whig	
Derbyshire (two members)	Samuel Crompton		
Devizes (two members)	John Pearse		
Devizes (two members)	George Watson-Taylor		
Devon (two members)	Edmund Pollexfen Bastard		
Devon (two members)	Sir Thomas Dyke-Acland, Bt	Tory	
Donegal (two members)	Earl of Mount Charles		
Donegal (two members)	George Vaughan Hart		
Dorchester (two members)	Lord Ashley	Tory	
Dorchester (two members)	Robert Williams		
Dorset (two members)	Edward Portman		
Dorset (two members)	Henry Bankes		
Dover (two members)	Charles Poulett Thomson	Whig	
Dover (two members)	Edward Bootle-Wilbraham		
Down (two members)	Lord Arthur Hill	Whig	
Down (two members)	Frederick Stewart, Viscount Castlereagh	Tory	
Downpatrick	John Waring Maxwell	Tory	
Downton (two members)	Thomas Grimston Bucknall Estcourt (Note: Sat for Oxford University and replaced 16 December 1826 by Hon. Bartholomew Bouverie.)	Tory	
Downton (two members)	Robert Southey (Note: The poet laureate Robert Southey was proposed and elected without his knowledge, and declined to sit on the grounds that he did not meet the property qualification to be a borough MP. Replaced 18 December 1826 by Alexander Powell.)	Tory	
Drogheda	Peter Van Homrigh		
Droitwich (two members)	The Earl of Sefton	Whig	
Droitwich (two members)	John Hodgetts Hodgetts-Foley	Whig	
Dublin (two members)	Henry Grattan	Whig	
Dublin (two members)	George Ogle Moore	Tory	
County Dublin (two members)	Henry White		
County Dublin (two members)	Richard Talbot		
Dublin University	William Conyngham Plunket (Note: Ennobled and replaced 15 May 1827 by John Wilson Croker.)	Whig	
Dumfries Burghs	Lord William Robert Keith Douglas		
Dumfriesshire	Sir William Johnstone Hope		
Dunbartonshire	John Campbell	Tory	
Dundalk	Charles Barclay	Tory	
Dungannon	Hon. Thomas Knox		
Dungarvan	Hon. George Lamb	Whig	
Dunwich (two members)	Michael Barne		
Dunwich (two members)	Andrew Arcedeckne		
Durham City (two members)	Sir Henry Hardinge	Tory	
Durham City (two members)	Michael Angelo Taylor	Whig	
County Durham (two members)	John Lambton, 1st Earl of Durham	Radical	
County Durham (two members)	Hon. William Powlett	Whig	
Dysart Burghs	Sir Ronald Crauford Ferguson	Whig	
== E ==
Constituency	MP	Party	
East Grinstead (two members)	Hon. Charles Jenkinson		
East Grinstead (two members)	Lord Strathavon		
East Looe (two members)	Thomas Arthur Kemmis	Tory	
East Looe (two members)	Henry Thomas Hope	Tory	
East Retford (two members)	William Battie-Wrightson	Whig	
East Retford (two members)	Sir Robert Dundas	Whig	
Edinburgh	William Dundas	Tory	
Edinburghshire	See Midlothian		
Elgin	Alexander Duff		
Elginshire	Francis William Grant		
Ennis	Thomas Frankland Lewis	Tory	
Enniskillen	Richard Magenis	Tory	
Essex (two members)	Sir Eliab Harvey		
Essex (two members)	Charles Callis Western		
Evesham (two members)	Sir Charles Cockerell	Whig	
Evesham (two members)	Edward Davis Protheroe		
Exeter (two members)	Samuel Trehawke Kekewich		
Exeter (two members)	Lewis William Buck		
Eye (two members)	Sir Edward Kerrison, Bt	Tory	
Eye (two members)	Sir Miles Nightingall	Tory	
== F ==
Constituency	MP	Party	
Fermanagh (two members)	Mervyn Archdall	Tory	
Fermanagh (two members)	Viscount Corry	Tory	
Fife	James Erskine Wemyss		
Flint	Sir Edward Pryce Lloyd, Bt	Whig	
Flintshire	Sir Thomas Mostyn		
Forfarshire	William Maule		
Fowey (two members)	Hon. Robert Henley Eden	Tory	
Fowey (two members)	George Lucy	Tory	
== G ==
Constituency	MP	Party	
Gatton (two members)	William Scott		
Gatton (two members)	Michael Prendergast		
Galway Borough	James O'Hara		
County Galway (two members)	James Daly		
County Galway (two members)	Richard Martin		
Glamorganshire	Sir Christopher Cole		
Glasgow Burghs	Archibald Campbell		
Gloucester (two members)	John Philpotts	Whig	
Gloucester (two members)	Edward Webb	Whig	
Gloucestershire (two members)	Lord Edward Somerset	Tory	
Gloucestershire (two members)	Sir Berkeley Guise, Bt	Whig	
Grantham (two members)	Frederick James Tollemache	Tory	
Grantham (two members)	Sir Montague Cholmeley, 2nd Baronet		
Great Bedwyn	Sir John Nicholl	Tory	
Great Bedwyn	John Jacob Buxton	Tory	
Great Marlow	Thomas Peers Williams	Tory	
Great Marlow	Owen Williams	Whig	
Grimsby (two members)	Charles Wood		
Grimsby (two members)	George Fieschi Heneage		
Great Yarmouth (two members)	Hon. George Anson	Whig	
Great Yarmouth (two members)	Charles Edmund Rumbold	Whig	
Guildford (two members)	George Chapple Norton	Tory	
Guildford (two members)	Arthur Onslow	Tory	
== H ==
Constituency	MP	Party	
Haddington	Sir Adolphus Dalrymple, 2nd Baronet	Tory	
Haddingtonshire	Lord John Hay	Whig	
Hampshire (two members)	John Willis Fleming	Tory	
Hampshire (two members)	Sir William Heathcote, Bt	Tory	
Harwich (two members)	Nicholas Conyngham Tindal (Note: Vacated seat and replaced 16 May 1827 by Sir William Rae.)	Tory	
Harwich (two members)	John Charles Herries	Tory	
Haslemere (two members)	George Lowther Thompson	Tory	
Haslemere (two members)	Sir John Beckett, Bt	Tory	
Hastings (two members)	Sir William Curtis, Bt. (Note: Vacated seat and replaced 15 December 1826 by James Law Lushington.)		
Hastings (two members)	Sir Charles Wetherell (Note: Appointed to Crown office and replaced 15 December 1826 by Evelyn Denison.)		
Haverfordwest	Richard Philipps		
Hedon (two members)	John Baillie	Tory	
Hedon (two members)	Thomas Hyde Villiers	Whig	
Helston (two members)	Lord James Townshend	Tory	
Helston (two members)	Francis D'Arcy-Osborne, 7th Duke of Leeds		
Hereford (two members)	Edward Bolton Clive	Whig	
Hereford (two members)	Viscount Eastnor		
Herefordshire (two members)	Sir Robert Price, Bt	Whig	
Herefordshire (two members)	Sir John Cotterell, Bt	Tory	
Hertford (two members)	Thomas Byron		
Hertford (two members)	Thomas Slingsby Duncombe	Radical	
Hertfordshire (two members)	Nicolson Calvert	Whig	
Hertfordshire (two members)	Sir John Sebright, Bt	Whig	
Heytesbury	Edward Henry A'Court		
Heytesbury	Henry Stafford Northcote		
Higham Ferrers	Major-General Frederick Ponsonby	Whig	
Hindon (two members)	George Matthew Fortescue	Whig	
Hindon (two members)	Arthur Gough-Calthorpe	Whig	
Honiton (two members)	Josiah John Guest		
Honiton (two members)	Henry Baines Lott		
Horsham (two members)	Henry Fox (Note: Vacated seat and replaced 14 February 1827 by Nicholas Colborne.)	Whig	
Horsham (two members)	Robert Hurst	Whig	
Huntingdon (two members)	James Stuart		
Huntingdon (two members)	John Calvert		
Huntingdonshire (two members)	Viscount Mandeville		
Huntingdonshire (two members)	William Henry Fellowes		
Hythe (two members)	Sir Robert Townsend-Farquhar		
Hythe (two members)	Stewart Marjoribanks		
== I ==
Constituency	MP	Party	
Ilchester (two members)	Richard Sharp (Note: Unseated on petition. Replaced 23 February 1827 by Hon. Lionel Tollemache.)	Whig	
Ilchester (two members)	John Williams (Note: Unseated on petition. Replaced 23 February 1827 by Hon. Felix Tollemache.)	Whig	
Inverness Burghs	Robert Grant	Whig	
Inverness-shire	Rt Hon. Charles Grant	Whig	
Ipswich (two members)	William Haldimand (Note: Unseated on petition. Replaced 23 February 1827 by Robert Adam Dundas.)	Whig	
Ipswich (two members)	Robert Torrens (Note: Unseated on petition. Replaced 23 February 1827 by Charles Mackinnon.)	Whig	
== K ==
Constituency	MP	Party	
Kent (two members)	Sir Edward Knatchbull, Bt	Tory	
Kent (two members)	William Philip Honywood	Whig	
Kerry (two members)	William Hare	Whig	
Kerry (two members)	Maurice Fitzgerald	Whig	
Kildare (two members)	Lord William Charles O'Brien FitzGerald	Whig	
Kildare (two members)	Robert La Touche	Whig	
Kilkenny City	John Doherty		
County Kilkenny (two members)	John Ponsonby, Viscount Duncannon		
County Kilkenny (two members)	Charles Harwood Butler Clarke		
Kincardineshire	Sir Hugh Arbuthnot		
King's County (two members)	Lord Oxmantown		
King's County (two members)	Thomas Bernard		
King's Lynn (two members)	John Walpole		
King's Lynn (two members)	Lord William Bentinck	Whig	
Kingston upon Hull (two members)	John Augustus O'Neill	Tory	
Kingston upon Hull (two members)	Daniel Sykes	Whig	
Kinross-shire	George Edward Graham		
Kinsale	John Russell	Whig	
Kirkcudbright	Robert Cutlar Fergusson		
Knaresborough (two members)	Sir James Mackintosh	Whig	
Knaresborough (two members)	George Tierney	Whig	
== L ==
Constituency	MP	Party	
Lanark Burghs	Adam Hay		
Lanarkshire (Note: Died and replaced 16 October 1827 by Sir Michael Shaw-Stewart of Greenock and Blackhall.)	Lord Archibald Hamilton		
Lancashire (two members)	Lord Stanley		
Lancashire (two members)	John Blackburne		
Lancaster (two members)	John Fenton-Cawthorne	Tory	
Lancaster (two members)	Thomas Greene	Tory	
Launceston (two members)	Pownoll Bastard Pellew	Tory	
Launceston (two members)	James Brogden	Tory	
Leicester (two members)	Sir Charles Abney-Hastings		
Leicester (two members)	Robert Otway-Cave		
Leicestershire (two members)	Lord Robert William Manners		
Leicestershire (two members)	George Anthony Legh-Keck		
Leitrim (two members)	Samuel White		
Leitrim (two members)	Robert Clements, Viscount Clements		
Leominster (two members)	The Lord Hotham		
Leominster (two members)	Thomas Bish		
Lewes (two members)	Thomas Read Kemp	Whig	
Lewes (two members)	John Shelley		
Lichfield (two members)	GeorgeGranville Venables Vernon	Whig	
Lichfield (two members)	Sir George Anson	Whig	
Limerick City	Thomas Spring Rice	Whig	
County Limerick (two members)	Thomas Lloyd		
County Limerick (two members)	Richard FitzGibbon		
Lincoln (two members)	John Nicholas Fazakerley		
Lincoln (two members)	Charles Delaet Waldo Sibthorp		
Lincolnshire (two members)	Sir William Amcotts-Ingilby, Bt.		
Lincolnshire (two members)	Charles Chaplin		
Linlithgowshire	Sir Alexander Hope	Tory	
Lisburn	Henry Meynell	Tory	
Liskeard (two members)	Lord Eliot	Tory	
Liskeard (two members)	Sir William Pringle	Tory	
Liverpool (two members)	Colonel Isaac Gascoyne	Tory	
Liverpool (two members)	William Huskisson (Note: Killed by train 15 September 1830. replaced by William Ewart, November 1830.)	Tory	
The City London (four members)	William Thompson	Tory	
The City London (four members)	Robert Waithman	Whig	
The City London (four members)	William Ward	Tory	
The City London (four members)	Sir Matthew Wood, Bt	Whig	
Londonderry City	Sir Robert Alexander Ferguson, Bt	Whig	
County Londonderry (two members)	Alexander Robert Stewart		
County Londonderry (two members)	George Robert Dawson		
County Longford (two members)	Sir George Fetherston, Bt		
County Longford (two members)	Viscount Forbes		
Lostwithiel (two members)	Viscount Valletort	Tory	
Lostwithiel (two members)	Sir Alexander Cray Grant (Note: Chose to sit for Aldborough and replaced 18 December 1826 by the Hon. Edward Cust.)	Tory	
County Louth (two members)	John Leslie Foster		
County Louth (two members)	Alexander Dawson		
Ludgershall (two members)	Edward Thomas Foley	Tory	
Ludgershall (two members)	George James Welbore Agar-Ellis	Whig	
Ludlow (two members)	Viscount Clive	Tory	
Ludlow (two members)	Robert Clive		
Lyme Regis (two members)	Hon. Henry Sutton Fane	Tory	
Lyme Regis (two members)	John Thomas Fane	Tory	
Lymington (two members)	Walter Boyd		
Lymington (two members)	Guy Lenox Prendergast (Note: Vacated seat and replaced 9 July 1827 by Thomas Divett.)		
== M ==
Constituency	MP	Party	
Maidstone (two members)	Abraham Wildey Robarts	Whig	
Maidstone (two members)	John Wells		
Maldon (two members)	Hon. George Allanson Winn (Note: Winn died and was replaced 3 December 1827 by Hugh Dick.)	Tory	
Maldon (two members)	Thomas Barrett Lennard	Whig	
Mallow	Sir Denham Jephson-Norreys, Bt	Whig	
Malmesbury (two members)	Sir Charles Forbes, Bt	Tory	
Malmesbury (two members)	John Forbes	Tory	
Malton (two members)	John Charles Ramsden	Whig	
Malton (two members)	Viscount Normanby	Canningite	
Marlborough (two members)	Earl Bruce	Whig	
Marlborough (two members)	Lord Brudenell	Tory	
Mayo (two members)	James Browne		
Mayo (two members)	Lord Bingham		
Meath (two members)	Thomas Taylour, Earl of Bective		
Meath (two members)	Sir Marcus Somerville, Bt		
Merioneth	Sir Robert Williames Vaughan	Tory	
Middlesex (two members)	George Byng	Whig	
Middlesex (two members)	Samuel Charles Whitbread	Whig	
Midhurst (two members)	Abel Smith	Tory	
Midhurst (two members)	John Smith	Tory	
Midlothian	Sir George Clerk, Bt	Tory	
Milborne Port (two members)	Arthur Chichester	Whig	
Milborne Port (two members)	Thomas North Graves (Note: Appointed to Crown office and replaced 9 July 1827 by John Henry North.)	Tory	
Minehead (two members)	John Fownes Luttrell, junior	Tory	
Minehead (two members)	James Blair	Tory	
Mitchell (two members)	William Leake	Whig	
Mitchell (two members)	Henry Labouchere	Whig	
Monaghan (two members)	Henry Westenra		
Monaghan (two members)	Evelyn Shirley		
Monmouth Boroughs	Marquess of Worcester	Tory	
Monmouthshire (two members)	Charles Gould Morgan		
Monmouthshire (two members)	Lord Granville Somerset	Tory	
Montgomery	Henry Clive		
Montgomeryshire	Charles Williams-Wynn	Tory	
Morpeth (two members)	William Ord	Whig	
Morpeth (two members)	Viscount Morpeth		
== N ==
Constituency	MP	Party	
Nairnshire	no return - alternating constituency with Cromartyshire		
Newark (two members)	Henry Willoughby	Tory	
Newark (two members)	Sir William Henry Clinton	Tory	
Newcastle-under-Lyme (two members)	Richardson Borradaile	Tory	
Newcastle-under-Lyme (two members)	Robert John Wilmot	Tory	
Newcastle-upon-Tyne (two members)	Sir Matthew White Ridley, Bt	Whig	
Newcastle-upon-Tyne (two members)	Cuthbert Ellison	Whig	
Newport (Cornwall) (two members)	Charles Bertie Percy	Tory	
Newport (Cornwall) (two members)	Jonathan Raine	Tory	
Newport (IoW) (two members)	George Canning (Note: Appointed to Crown office and replaced 24 April 1827 by Hon. William Lamb.)	Tory	
Newport (IoW) (two members)	Hon. William Scott	Tory	
New Radnor	See Radnor		
New Ross	William Wigram	Tory	
Newry	Hon. John Henry Knox	Tory	
New Shoreham (two members)	Sir Charles Burrell, Bt	Tory	
New Shoreham (two members)	Henry Howard		
Newton (two members)	Thomas Legh		
Newton (two members)	Thomas Alcock		
Newtown (IoW) (two members)	Hudson Gurney	Whig	
Newtown (IoW) (two members)	Charles Compton Cavendish	Whig	
Norfolk (two members)	Thomas Coke	Whig	
Norfolk (two members)	Edmond Wodehouse	Tory	
Northallerton (two members)	Sir John Poo Beresford	Tory	
Northallerton (two members)	Henry Lascelles	Tory	
Northampton (two members)	Sir George Robinson, Bt.		
Northampton (two members)	William Maberly		
Northamptonshire (two members)	Viscount Althorp	Whig	
Northamptonshire (two members)	William Ralph Cartwright	Tory	
Northumberland (two members)	Matthew Bell	Tory	
Northumberland (two members)	Hon. Henry Liddell	Tory	
Norwich (two members)	William Smith	Radical	
Norwich (two members)	Jonathan Peel	Tory	
Nottingham (two members)	The Lord Rancliffe		
Nottingham (two members)	Joseph Birch		
Nottinghamshire (two members)	Frank Frank (or Sotheron)	Tory	
Nottinghamshire (two members)	John Lumley	Whig	
== O ==
Constituency	MP	Party	
Okehampton (two members)	Sir Compton Domvile	Tory	
Okehampton (two members)	Joseph Holden Strutt	Tory	
Old Sarum (two members)	James Alexander	Tory	
Old Sarum (two members)	Josias Alexander	Tory	
Orford (two members)	Sir Henry Frederick Cooke	Tory	
Orford (two members)	Horace Seymour (Note: Chose to sit for Bodmin. Replaced 26 December 1826 by Quintin Dick.)	Tory	
Orkney and Shetland	George Heneage Lawrence Dundas		
Oxford (two members)	James Haughton Langston	Whig	
Oxford (two members)	John Ingram Lockhart		
Oxfordshire (two members)	William Henry Ashhurst	Tory	
Oxfordshire (two members)	John Fane	Tory	
Oxford University (two members)	Thomas Grimston Bucknall Estcourt	Tory	
Oxford University (two members)	Robert Peel	Tory	
== P ==
Constituency	MP	Party	
Peeblesshire	Sir James Montgomery, Bt	Tory	
Pembroke	Hugh Owen Owen	Tory	
Pembrokeshire	Sir John Owen, Bt		
Penryn (two members)	David Barclay	Whig	
Penryn (two members)	William Manning	Tory	
Perth Burghs	Hon. Hugh Primrose Lindsay		
Perthshire	Sir George Murray		
Peterborough (two members)	Sir Robert Heron, Bt	Whig	
Peterborough (two members)	James Scarlett	Whig	
Petersfield (two members)	Hylton Jolliffe		
Petersfield (two members)	William Marshall		
Plymouth (two members)	Sir William Congreve		
Plymouth (two members)	Sir Thomas Byam Martin		
Plympton Erle (two members)	George Edgcumbe (Note: Vacated seat and replaced 16 December 1826 by Sir Charles Wetherall.)	Tory	
Plympton Erle (two members)	Gibbs Crawfurd Antrobus	Tory	
Pontefract (two members)	Thomas Houldsworth		
Pontefract (two members)	Le Gendre Nicholas Starkie		
Poole (two members)	Hon. William Ponsonby		
Poole (two members)	Benjamin Lester Lester	Whig	
Portarlington	James Farquhar	Tory	
Portsmouth (two members)	Sir Francis Baring, Bt	Whig	
Portsmouth (two members)	John Bonham Carter	Whig	
Preston (two members)	Edward Stanley	Whig	
Preston (two members)	John Wood	Whig	
== Q ==
Constituency	MP	Party	
Queenborough (two members)	The Lord Downes	Tory	
Queenborough (two members)	John Capel	Tory	
Queen's County (two members)	Sir Charles Coote, Bt		
Queen's County (two members)	Sir Henry Parnell		
== R ==
Constituency	MP	Party	
Radnor	Richard Price	Tory	
Radnorshire	Walter Wilkins	Whig	
Reading (two members)	John Berkeley Monck		
Reading (two members)	George Spence (Note: Unseated on Petition and replaced 26 March 1827 by Charles Fyshe Palmer.)		
Reigate (two members)	Sir Joseph Sydney Yorke	Tory	
Reigate (two members)	James Cocks		
Renfrewshire	John Maxwell		
Richmond (two members)	Hon. John Dundas	Whig	
Richmond (two members)	Samuel Barrett Moulton Barrett	Whig	
Ripon (two members)	Frederick John Robinson (Note: Ennobled and replaced 15 May 1827 by Louis Hayes Petei.)	Tory	
Ripon (two members)	Lancelot Shadwell	Tory	
Rochester (two members)	Captain Henry Dundas		
Rochester (two members)	Ralph Bernal		
Romney (two members)	George Hay Dawkins-Pennant	Tory	
Romney (two members)	George Tapps	Tory	
Roscommon (two members)	Arthur French		
Roscommon (two members)	Robert King		
Ross-shire	Sir James Wemyss Mackenzie, 5th Baronet		
Roxburghshire	Henry Francis Hepburne-Scott	Tory	
Rutland (two members)	Sir Gerard Noel, Bt	Tory	
Rutland (two members)	Sir Gilbert Heathcote, Bt	Whig	
Rye (two members)	Hugh Duncan Baillie		
Rye (two members)	Henry Bonham (Note: Vacated seat and replaced 1 March 1830 by George de Lacy Evans.)		
== S ==
Constituency	MP	Party	
St Albans (two members)	John Easthope	Whig	
St Albans (two members)	Christopher Smith	Tory	
St Germans (two members)	Charles Ross	Tory	
St Germans (two members)	Charles Arbuthnot (Note: Vacated seat and replaced 7 Jun 1827 by James Loch.)	Tory	
St Ives (two members)	James Halse		
St Ives (two members)	Sir Christopher Hawkins	Tory	
St Mawes (two members)	Scrope Bernard-Morland	Tory	
St Mawes (two members)	Sir Codrington Carrington	Tory	
Salisbury (two members)	Viscount Folkestone		
Salisbury (two members)	Wadham Wyndham	Tory	
Saltash (two members)	Andrew Spottiswoode		
Saltash (two members)	Henry Monteith (Note: Vacated seat and replaced 19 December 1826 by Colin Campbell Macauley.)		
Sandwich (two members)	Joseph Marryatt	Whig	
Sandwich (two members)	Sir Edward Campbell Rich Owen		
Scarborough (two members)	Charles Manners-Sutton		
Scarborough (two members)	Edmund Phipps	Tory	
Seaford (two members)	John Fitzgerald	Tory	
Seaford (two members)	Augustus Frederick Ellis	Tory	
Selkirkshire	William Eliott-Lockhart		
Shaftesbury (two members)	Ralph Leycester		
Shaftesbury (two members)	Edward Davies Davenport		
Shrewsbury (two members)	Panton Corbett	Tory	
Shrewsbury (two members)	Robert Aglionby Slaney	Whig	
Shropshire (two members)	John Cressett-Pelham		
Shropshire (two members)	Sir Rowland Hill, Bt		
Sligo	John Arthur Wynne	Tory	
County Sligo (two members)	Edward Synge Cooper		
County Sligo (two members)	Henry King		
Somerset (two members)	Sir Thomas Lethbridge	Whig	
Somerset (two members)	William Dickinson		
Southampton (two members)	Abel Rous Dottin		
Southampton (two members)	William Chamberlayne		
Southwark (two members)	Sir Robert Wilson	Whig	
Southwark (two members)	Charles Calvert	Whig	
Stafford (two members)	Richard Ironmonger (Note: Died and replaced 15 December 1826 by Thomas Wentworth Beaumont.)		
Stafford (two members)	Ralph Benson		
Staffordshire (two members)	Edward Littleton	Whig	
Staffordshire (two members)	Major-General Sir John Wrottesley	Whig	
Stamford (two members)	Lord Thomas Cecil	Tory	
Stamford (two members)	Thomas Chaplin	Tory	
Steyning (two members)	George Richard Philips	Whig	
Steyning (two members)	Peter du Cane	Whig	
Stirling Burghs	Robert Downie		
Stirlingshire	Henry Home-Drummond		
Stockbridge (two members)	Thomas Grosvenor	Whig	
Stockbridge (two members)	George Wilbraham	Whig	
Sudbury (two members)	John Wilks	Tory	
Sudbury (two members)	Bethel Walrond		
Suffolk (two members)	Sir William Rowley		
Suffolk (two members)	Thomas Gooch		
Surrey (two members)	William Joseph Denison	Whig	
Surrey (two members)	Charles Nicholas Pallmer	Whig	
Sussex (two members)	Edward Jeremiah Curteis		
Sussex (two members)	Walter Burrell	Tory	
Sutherland	Lord Francis Leveson-Gower		
== T ==
Constituency	MP	Party	
Tain Burghs	Sir Hugh Innes, Bt	Tory	
Tamworth (two members)	William Yates Peel		
Tamworth (two members)	Lord Charles Townshend		
Taunton (two members)	Henry Seymour		
Taunton (two members)	William Peachey		
Tavistock (two members)	Lord William Russell	Whig	
Tavistock (two members)	Viscount Ebrington	Whig	
Tewkesbury (two members)	John Edmund Dowdeswell	Tory	
Tewkesbury (two members)	John Martin	Whig	
Thetford (two members)	Lord Charles FitzRoy		
Thetford (two members)	Bingham Baring		
Thirsk (two members)	Robert Frankland	Whig	
Thirsk (two members)	Robert Greenhill-Russell	Whig	
Tipperary (two members)	Francis Aldborough Prittie		
Tipperary (two members)	John Hely Hutchinson		
Tiverton (two members)	Viscount Sandon	Tory	
Tiverton (two members)	Hon. Granville Ryder	Tory	
Totnes (two members)	The Earl of Darlington		
Totnes (two members)	Thomas Courtenay		
Tralee	James Cuffe (Note: Died and replaced 11 September 1828 by Sir Edward Denny.)	Tory	
Tregony (two members)	Stephen Lushington (judge)	Whig	
Tregony (two members)	James Brougham	Whig	
Truro (two members)	Lord FitzRoy Somerset	Tory	
Truro (two members)	William Edward Tomline	Tory	
Tyrone (two members)	Hon. Henry Lowry-Corry	Tory	
Tyrone (two members)	William Stewart	Whig	
== W ==
Constituency	MP	Party	
Wallingford (two members)	William Hughes	Whig	
Wallingford (two members)	Robert Knight	Whig	
Wareham (two members)	John Hales Calcraft	Whig	
Wareham (two members)	Charles Baring Wall		
Warwick (two members)	John Tomes		
Warwick (two members)	Hon. Sir Charles Greville	Tory	
Warwickshire (two members)	Dugdale Stratford Dugdale		
Warwickshire (two members)	Francis Lawley	Whig	
Waterford City	Sir John Newport, Bt.	Whig	
County Waterford (two members)	Richard Power		
County Waterford (two members)	Henry Villiers-Stuart		
Wells (two members)	Sir Charles Taylor	Whig	
Wells (two members)	John Paine Tudway	Tory	
Wendover (two members)	George Smith	Whig	
Wendover (two members)	Abel Smith	Tory	
Wenlock (two members)	John George Weld-Forester		
Wenlock (two members)	Paul Beilby Thompson	Whig	
Weobley (two members)|	Westbury (two members)	Sir Manasseh Masseh Lopes, Bt	Tory
Weobley (two members)|	Westbury (two members)	Sir George Warrender	Canningite
Westmeath (two members)	Gustavus Rochfort	Tory	
Westmeath (two members)	Hugh Morgan Tuite	Tory	
West Looe (two members)	Charles Buller	Whig	
West Looe (two members)	John Buler	Whig	
Westminster (two members)	Sir Francis Burdett, Bt	Whig	
Westminster (two members)	Sir John Cam Hobhouse, Bt	Whig	
Westmorland (two members)	Henry Cecil Lowther	Tory	
Westmorland (two members)	Viscount Lowther	Tory	
Wexford	Rear Admiral Henry Evans	Tory	
County Wexford (two members)	Robert Carew	Whig	
County Wexford (two members)	Viscount Stopford		
Weymouth and Melcombe Regis (four members)	Colonel John Gordon	Tory	
Weymouth and Melcombe Regis (four members)	Thomas Fowell Buxton	Whig	
Weymouth and Melcombe Regis (four members)	Thomas Wallace	Tory	
Weymouth and Melcombe Regis (four members)	Masterton Ure	Tory	
Whitchurch (two members)	Hon. John Townshend	Tory	
Whitchurch (two members)	Sir Samuel Scott, Bt	Tory	
Wicklow (two members)	Hon. Granville Proby	Whig	
Wicklow (two members)	James Grattan	Whig	
Wigan (two members)	James Alexander Hodson	Tory	
Wigan (two members)	James Lindsay	Tory	
Wigtown Burghs	John Henry Lowther	Tory	
Wigtownshire	Sir William Maxwell	Tory	
Wilton (two members)	Edward Baker		
Wilton (two members)	John Hungerford Penruddocke	Tory	
Wiltshire (two members)	John Benett		
Wiltshire (two members)	Sir John Dugdale Astley, Bt		
Winchelsea (two members)	Henry Brougham, 1st Baron Brougham and Vaux	Whig	
Winchelsea (two members)	Viscount Howick	Whig	
Winchester (two members)	Sir Edward Hyde East, Bt		
Winchester (two members)	Paulet St John-Mildmay		
Windsor (two members)	Sir Richard Hussey Vivian		
Windsor (two members)	John Ramsbottom, junior	Whig	
Woodstock (two members)	The Marquess of Blandford	Tory	
Woodstock (two members)	Lord Ashley	Tory	
Wootton Bassett (two members)	Horace Twiss	Tory	
Wootton Bassett (two members)	Sir George Philips	Whig	
Worcester (two members)	Thomas Henry Hastings Davies	Whig	
Worcester (two members)	George Richard Robinson	Whig	
Worcestershire (two members)	Sir Thomas Winnington		
Worcestershire (two members)	Henry Lygon		
Wycombe (two members)	Sir Thomas Baring, Bt		
Wycombe (two members)	Sir John Dashwood-King, Bt	Tory	
== Y ==
Constituency	MP	Party	
Yarmouth (Isle of Wight) (two members)	Lord Binning (Note: Ennobled and replaced 21 August 1827 by Thomas Wallace.)	Tory	
Yarmouth (Isle of Wight) (two members)	Joseph Phillimore	Tory	
Yarmouth (Norfolk)	See Great Yarmouth		
York (two members)	James Wilson	Tory	
York (two members)	Marmaduke Wyvill	Whig	
Yorkshire (four members)	Viscount Milton	Whig	
Yorkshire (four members)	William Duncombe	Tory	
Yorkshire (four members)	Richard Fountayne Wilson	Tory	
Yorkshire (four members)	John Marshall	Whig	
Youghal	Hon. George Ponsonby	Whig	

== See also ==
- 1826 United Kingdom general election
- List of United Kingdom by-elections (1818–1832)
- List of parliaments of the United Kingdom
