= List of MPs elected in the 1830 United Kingdom general election =

1830–1831 Parliament of the United Kingdom
←	1826–1830 Parliament	1831–1832 Parliament	→
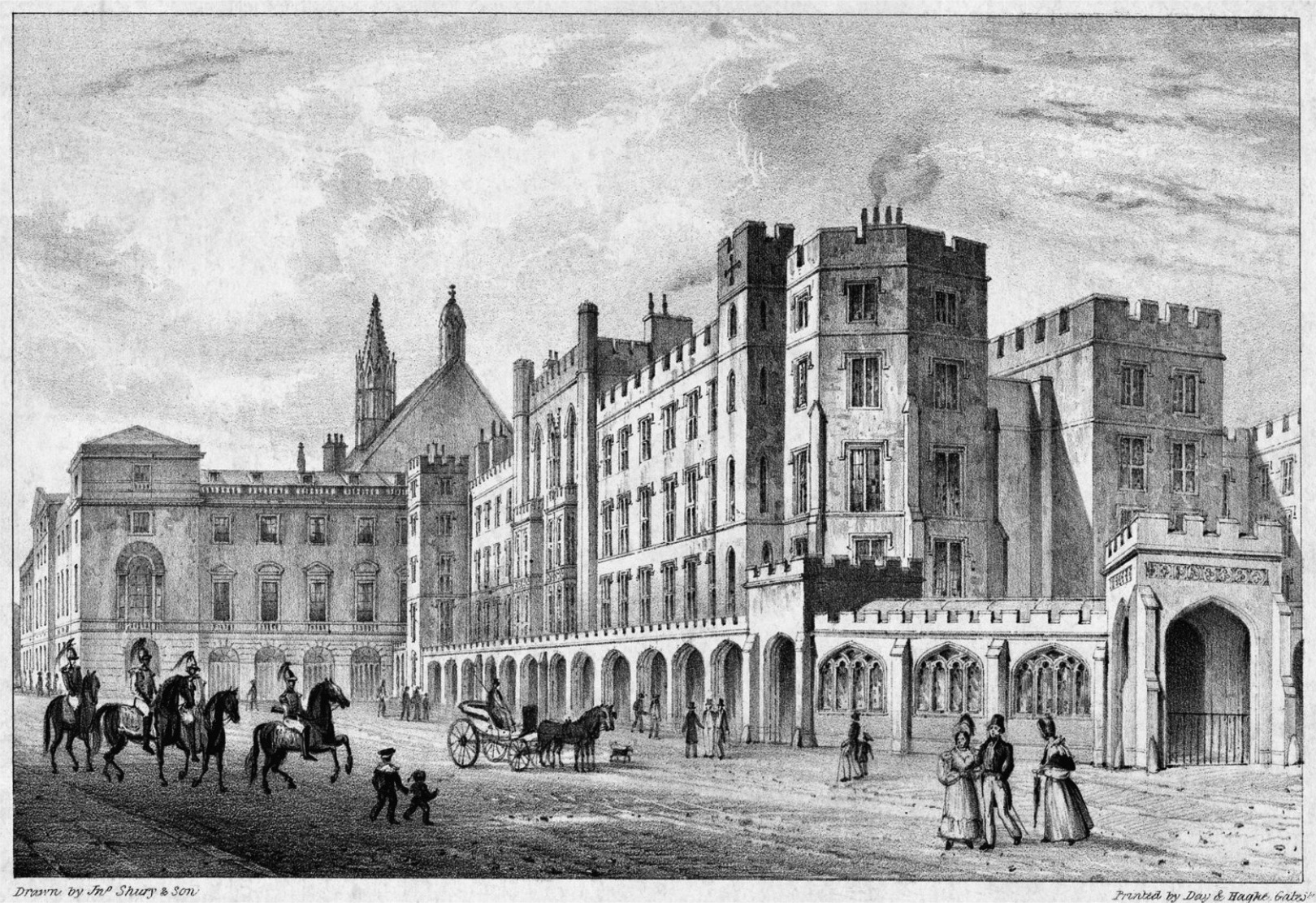
- The Palace of Westminster in 1834

Overview
- Legislative body: Parliament of the United Kingdom
- Jurisdiction: United Kingdom
- Meeting place: Palace of Westminster
- Term: 26 October 1830 – 22 April 1831
- Election: 1830 United Kingdom general election

House of Commons
- Members: 658
- Speaker: Charles Manners-Sutton
- Leader: John Spencer
- Leader of the Opposition: Sir Robert Peel

Crown-in-Parliament William IV

Sessions
- 1st: 26 October 1830 – 22 April 1831

This is a list of MPs elected to the House of Commons at the 1830 United Kingdom general election, arranged by constituency. The Parliament was summoned 24 July 1830, assembled 14 September 1830 (but prorogued to 26 October) and dissolved 23 April 1831. The Prime Minister was the leader of the Whig Party, Charles Grey, 2nd Earl Grey.

Table of contents:

A B C D E F G H I K L M N O P Q R S T W Y Changes

== A ==
Constituency	MP	Party
Aberdeen Burghs	Sir James Carnegie, Bt	Tory
Aberdeenshire	William Gordon	Tory
Abingdon	John Maberly	Whig
Aldborough (two members)	Clinton James Fynes Clinton	Tory
Aldborough (two members)	Viscount Stormont	Tory
Aldeburgh (two members)	Marquess of Douro	Tory
Aldeburgh (two members)	John Wilson Croker	Tory
Amersham (two members)	William Tyrwhitt-Drake	Tory
Amersham (two members)	Thomas Tyrwhitt-Drake	Tory
Andover (two members)	Sir John Pollen, 2nd Baronet	Tory
Andover (two members)	Thomas Assheton Smith II	Tory
Anglesey	The Earl of Uxbridge	Whig
Anstruther Burghs	James Balfour	Tory
Antrim (two members)	The Earl of Belfast	Whig
Antrim (two members)	Hon. John Bruce Richard O'Neill	Tory
Appleby (two members)	Hon. Henry Tufton	Whig
Appleby (two members)	Viscount Maitland	Tory
Argyllshire	Walter Frederick Campbell	Whig
Armagh	Rt Hon. Henry Goulburn	Tory
County Armagh (two members)	Viscount Acheson	Whig
County Armagh (two members)	Charles Brownlow	Whig
Arundel (two members)	Lord Dudley Stuart	Whig
Arundel (two members)	John Atkins	Independent - Tory leaning
Ashburton (two members)	Sir Lawrence Vaughan Palk	
Ashburton (two members)	Charles Arbuthnot (Note: Vacated seat and replaced 25 February 1831 by William Stephen Poyntz.)	Tory
Athlone	Richard Handcock	Tory
Aylesbury (two members)	The Lord Nugent	Whig
Aylesbury (two members)	William Rickford	Whig
Ayr	Thomas Francis Kennedy	Whig
Ayrshire	William Blair	
== B ==
Constituency	MP	Party
Banbury	Henry Villiers-Stuart	Tory
Bandon	James Bernard, Viscount Bernard (Note: Made a Peer of Ireland and replaced 6 January 1831 by Francis Bernard.)	Tory
Banffshire	John Morison	Whig
Barnstaple (two members)	Stephens Lyne-Stephens	Tory
Barnstaple (two members)	George Tudor	Independent - Tory leaning
Bath (two members)	Lord John Thynne	Tory
Bath (two members)	Charles Palmer	Whig
Beaumaris	Sir Robert Williams, Bt	
Bedford (two members)	Frederick Polhill	Tory
Bedford (two members)	William Henry Whitbread	Whig
Bedfordshire (two members)	Francis Russell	Whig
Bedfordshire (two members)	William Stuart	Tory
Belfast	Sir Arthur Chichester	Whig
Bere Alston (two members)	Christopher Blackett	
Bere Alston (two members)	Lord Lovaine (Note: Ennobled and replaced 11 January 1831 by David Lyon)	
Berkshire (two members)	Robert Palmer	Tory
Berkshire (two members)	Charles Dundas, 1st Baron Amesbury	Whig
Berwickshire	Anthony Maitland, 10th Earl of Lauderdale	
Berwick-upon-Tweed (two members)	Marcus Beresford	
Berwick-upon-Tweed (two members)	Sir Francis Blake, Bt	Whig
Beverley (two members)	Daniel Sykes	Whig
Beverley (two members)	Henry Burton	Whig
Bewdley	Wilson Aylesbury Roberts	Tory
Bishop's Castle (two members)	Frederick Hamilton Cornewall	
Bishop's Castle (two members)	Edward Rogers	
Bletchingley (two members)	Robert William Mills (Note: Resigned and replaced 18 February 1831 by Sir William Home)	Whig
Bletchingley (two members)	Charles Tennyson	Whig
Bodmin (two members)	Horace Seymour	
Bodmin (two members)	Davies Giddy later Gilbert	
Boroughbridge (two members)	Sir Charles Wetherell	Tory
Boroughbridge (two members)	Matthias Attwood	Tory
Bossiney (two members)	Charles Stuart-Wortley-Mackenzie (Note: Resigned and replaced 16 February 1831 by John Stuart-Worsley)	Tory
Bossiney (two members)	Edward Rose Tunno	Tory
Boston (two members)	John Wilks	Whig
Boston (two members)	Neil Malcolm	
Brackley (two members)	James Bradshaw	Tory
Brackley (two members)	Robert Haldane Bradshaw	Tory
Bramber (two members)	John Irving	
Bramber (two members)	Frederick Gough-Calthorpe	
Brecon	Charles Morgan Robinson Morgan	Whig
Breconshire	Thomas Wood	Tory
Bridgnorth (two members)	William Wolryche-Whitmore	
Bridgnorth (two members)	Thomas Whitmore	
Bridgwater (two members)	William Thornton Astell	
Bridgwater (two members)	Charles Kemeys Kemeys Tynte	Whig
Bridport (two members)	Henry Warburton	Radical
Bridport (two members)	Sir Horace St Paul, Bt	
Bristol (two members)	Richard Hart Davis	Tory
Bristol (two members)	James Evan Baillie	Whig
Buckingham (two members)	Sir George Nugent, Bt	
Buckingham (two members)	Sir Thomas Fremantle, Bt	
Buckinghamshire (two members)	Marquess of Chandos	Tory
Buckinghamshire (two members)	Robert Smith	Whig
Bury St Edmunds (two members)	Earl Jermyn	Tory
Bury St Edmunds (two members)	Earl of Euston	
Buteshire	Sir William Rae, Bt	
== C ==
Constituency	MP	Party
Caernarvon	William Ormsby-Gore	Tory
Caernarvonshire	Charles Griffith-Wynne	
Caithness	no return - alternating constituency with Buteshire	
Callington (two members)	William Bingham Baring	Whig
Callington (two members)	Alexander Baring	Whig
Calne (two members)	Sir James Macdonald, Bt	Whig
Calne (two members)	Thomas Babington Macaulay	Whig
Cambridge (two members)	Frederick Trench	
Cambridge (two members)	Marquess of Graham	
Cambridge University (two members)	William Cavendish	Whig
Cambridge University (two members)	The 3rd Viscount Palmerston	Whig
Cambridgeshire (two members)	Henry John Adeane	Tory
Cambridgeshire (two members)	Lord Francis Godolphin	Tory
Camelford (two members)	Mark Milbank	Whig
Camelford (two members)	Sheldon Cradock	Whig
Canterbury (two members)	Richard Watson	Whig
Canterbury (two members)	Viscount Fordwich	Whig
Cardiff	Lord Patrick Crichton-Stuart	
Cardigan	Pryse Pryse	Whig
Cardiganshire	William Edward Powell	Tory
Carlisle (two members)	James Lushington	Tory
Carlisle (two members)	Philip Howard	Whig
Carlow	Lord Tullamore	Tory
County Carlow (two members)	Thomas Kavanagh	Tory
County Carlow (two members)	Henry Bruen	Tory
Carmarthen	John Jones	
Carmarthenshire	Hon. George Rice Rice-Trevor	Tory
Carrickfergus	Lord George Hill	Whig
Cashel	Mathew Pennefather	Tory
Castle Rising (two members)	Lord William Cholmondeley	Tory
Castle Rising (two members)	Fulk Greville Howard	Tory
Cavan (two members)	Henry Maxwell	Tory
Cavan (two members)	Alexander Saunderson	Tory
Cheshire (two members)	Viscount Belgrave	Tory
Cheshire (two members)	Wilbraham Egerton	Tory
Chester (two members)	Sir Philip de Malpas Grey Egerton, Bt	Tory
Chester (two members)	Lord Robert Grosvenor	Whig
Chichester (two members)	Lord John Lennox	Whig
Chichester (two members)	John Smith	
Chippenham (two members)	Joseph Neeld	Tory
Chippenham (two members)	Philip Pusey	
Christchurch (two members)	George Pitt Rose	
Christchurch (two members)	Sir George Henry Rose	Tory
Cirencester (two members)	Joseph Cripps	Tory
Cirencester (two members)	Lord Apsley	Tory
Clackmannanshire	George Ralph Abercromby	
Clare (two members)	William Nugent Macnamara	Whig
Clare (two members)	James Patrick Mahon (Note: Election declared void, 4 March 1831. By-election March, 1931)	Whig
Clitheroe (two members)	Hon. Peregrine Cust	Tory
Clitheroe (two members)	Hon.Robert Curzon	Tory
Clonmel	Eyre Coote	Tory
Clyde Burghs	See Glasgow Burghs	
Cockermouth (two members)	Viscount Garlies	Tory
Cockermouth (two members)	Philip Pleydell-Bouverie	Tory
Colchester (two members)	Daniel Whittle Harvey	Radical Party (UK)
Colchester (two members)	Andrew Spottiswoode (Note: On petition, Spottiswoode's election was declared void and a by-election was held)	
Coleraine	Sir John William Head Brydges	Tory
Corfe Castle (two members)	Philip John Miles	Tory
Corfe Castle (two members)	George Bankes	Tory
Cork City (two members)	Daniel Callaghan	Whig
Cork City (two members)	John Boyle	Whig
County Cork (two members)	Hon. Robert King	Whig
County Cork (two members)	Viscount Boyle	Whig
Cornwall (two members)	Edward William Wynne Pendarves	Whig
Cornwall (two members)	Sir Richard Rawlinson Vyvyan, Bt	Ultra-Tory
Coventry (two members)	Edward Ellice	Whig
Coventry (two members)	Thomas Bilcliffe Fyler	
Cricklade (two members)	Joseph Pitt	
Cricklade (two members)	Robert Gordon	Whig
Cromartyshire	No return - alternating constituency with Nairnshire	
Cumberland (two members)	Sir James Graham, Bt	Whig
Cumberland (two members)	John Lowther	Tory
== D ==
Constituency	MP	Party
Dartmouth	Arthur Howe Holdsworth	
Denbigh Boroughs	Robert Myddelton Biddulph	Whig
Denbighshire	Sir Watkin Williams-Wynn, Bt	
Derby (two members)	Henry Frederick Compton Cavendish	Whig
Derby (two members)	Edward Strutt	Whig
Derbyshire (two members)	Lord George Cavendish	Whig
Derbyshire (two members)	Francis Mundy	Tory
Devizes (two members)	John Pearse	
Devizes (two members)	George Watson-Taylor	
Devon (two members)	Viscount Ebrington	Whig
Devon (two members)	Sir Thomas Dyke-Acland, Bt	Tory
Donegal (two members)	Earl of Mount Charles	
Donegal (two members)	George Vaughan Hart	
Dorchester (two members)	Lord Ashley	Tory
Dorchester (two members)	Robert Williams	
Dorset (two members)	Edward Portman	
Dorset (two members)	Henry Bankes	
Dover (two members)	Charles Poulett Thomson (Note: Thomson was re-elected in 1832 but had also been elected for Manchester, which he chose to represent, and did not sit again for Dover)	Whig
Dover (two members)	Sir John Rae Reid, Bt	Tory
Down (two members)	Lord Arthur Hill	Whig
Down (two members)	Frederick Stewart, Viscount Castlereagh	Tory
Downpatrick	Edward Southwell Ruthven	Whig
Downton (two members)	James Brougham	Whig
Downton (two members)	Charles Shaw-Lefevre	Whig
Drogheda	John Henry North	Tory
Droitwich (two members)	The Earl of Sefton	Whig
Droitwich (two members)	John Hodgetts Hodgetts-Foley	Whig
Dublin (two members)	Sir Frederick Shaw, Bt	Tory
Dublin (two members)	George Ogle Moore	Tory
County Dublin (two members)	Henry White	
County Dublin (two members)	Lord Brabazon	
Dublin University	Thomas Langlois Lefroy	Tory
Dumfries Burghs	Lord William Robert Keith Douglas	
Dumfriesshire	John James Hope Johnstone	Tory
Dunbartonshire	Lord Montagu William Graham	Tory
Dundalk	Hon. John Hobart Cradock	Tory
Dungannon	Hon. Thomas Knox (Note: Thomas Knox resigned in December 1830 in favour of his son)	Tory
Dungarvan	Hon. George Lamb	Whig
Dunwich (two members)	Frederick Barne	
Dunwich (two members)	Andrew Arcedeckne	
Durham City (two members)	Sir Roger Gresley (Note: Election declared void, 8 March 1831. By-election, 23 March 1831)	Tory
Durham City (two members)	Michael Angelo Taylor	Whig
County Durham (two members)	William Russell	Whig
County Durham (two members)	Hon. William Powlett	Whig
Dysart Burghs	Lord Loughborough	Tory
== E ==
Constituency	MP	Party
East Grinstead (two members)	Viscount Holmesdale	Ultra-Tory
East Grinstead (two members)	Frederick Richard West	
East Looe (two members)	Thomas Arthur Kemmis	Tory
East Looe (two members)	Henry Thomas Hope	Tory
East Retford (two members)	Viscount Newark	Whig
East Retford (two members)	Arthur Duncombe	Tory
Edinburgh	William Dundas	
Edinburghshire	See Midlothian	
Elgin	Alexander Duff	
Elginshire	Francis William Grant	
Ennis	William Smith O'Brien	Tory
Enniskillen	Hon. Arthur Henry Cole	Tory
Essex (two members)	Sir John Tyssen Tyrell	
Essex (two members)	Charles Callis Western	
Evesham (two members)	Sir Charles Cockerell	Whig
Evesham (two members)	Lord Kennedy	
Exeter (two members)	James Wentworth Buller	
Exeter (two members)	Lewis William Buck	
Eye (two members)	Sir Edward Kerrison, Bt	Tory
Eye (two members)	Sir Philip Sidney, Bt	Tory
== F ==
Constituency	MP	Party
Fermanagh (two members)	Mervyn Archdall	Tory
Fermanagh (two members)	Viscount Corry	Tory
Fife	James Erskine Wemyss	
Flint	Sir Edward Pryce Lloyd, Bt	Whig
Flintshire	Sir Thomas Mostyn	
Forfarshire	William Maule	
Fowey (two members)	Lord Brudenell	Tory
Fowey (two members)	John Cheesment Severn	Tory
== G ==
Constituency	MP	Party
Gatton (two members)	Sir John Shelley	
Gatton (two members)	John Thomas Hope	Tory
Galway Borough	James O'Hara	
County Galway (two members)	Sir John Burke	
County Galway (two members)	James Staunton Lambert	
Glamorganshire	Christopher Rice Mansel Talbot	
Glasgow Burghs	Archibald Campbell	
Gloucester (two members)	John Philpotts	Whig
Gloucester (two members)	Edward Webb	Whig
Gloucestershire (two members)	Lord Edward Somerset	Tory
Gloucestershire (two members)	Sir Berkeley Guise, Bt	Whig
Grantham (two members)	Glynne Earle Welby, Bt	Tory
Grantham (two members)	Sir Montague Cholmeley, 2nd Baronet	
Great Bedwyn	Sir John Nicholl	Tory
Great Bedwyn	John Jacob Buxton	Tory
Great Marlow	Thomas Peers Williams	Tory
Great Marlow	Owen Williams	Whig
Grimsby (two members)	Charles Wood	
Grimsby (two members)	George Harris	
Great Yarmouth (two members)	Hon. George Anson	Whig
Great Yarmouth (two members)	Charles Edmund Rumbold	Whig
Guildford (two members)	Charles Baring Wall	Tory
Guildford (two members)	George Holme Sumner	Tory
== H ==
Constituency	MP	Party
Haddington	Sir Adolphus Dalrymple, 2nd Baronet	
Haddingtonshire	Lord John Hay	
Hampshire (two members)	John Willis Fleming	Tory
Hampshire (two members)	Sir William Heathcote, Bt	Ultra-Tory
Harwich (two members)	George Robert Dawson	
Harwich (two members)	John Charles Herries	Tory
Haslemere (two members)	William Holmes	Tory
Haslemere (two members)	Sir John Beckett, Bt	Tory
Hastings (two members)	Sir Henry Fane	
Hastings (two members)	Joseph Planta	
Haverfordwest	Richard Philipps	
Hedon (two members)	Sir Thomas Clifford-Constable, Bt	Tory
Hedon (two members)	Robert Farrand	Tory
Helston (two members)	Lord James Townshend	Tory
Helston (two members)	Sir Samuel Brooke-Pechell, Bt	Whig
Hereford (two members)	Edward Bolton Clive	Whig
Hereford (two members)	Viscount Eastnor	
Herefordshire (two members)	Sir Robert Price, Bt	Whig
Herefordshire (two members)	Sir John Cotterell, Bt	Tory
Hertford (two members)	Viscount Ingestrie	Tory
Hertford (two members)	Thomas Slingsby Duncombe	Radical
Hertfordshire (two members)	Nicolson Calvert	Whig
Hertfordshire (two members)	Sir John Sebright, Bt	
Heytesbury	Edward Henry A'Court	
Heytesbury	Sir George Staunton, Bt	
Higham Ferrers	Viscount Howick	Whig
Hindon (two members)	George Matthew Fortescue	Whig
Hindon (two members)	John Weyland	Whig
Honiton (two members)	Josiah John Guest	
Honiton (two members)	Sir George Warrender, Bt	
Horsham (two members)	Nicholas Ridley-Colborne, Bt	
Horsham (two members)	The Earl of Arundel	
Huntingdon (two members)	James Stuart	
Huntingdon (two members)	John Calvert	
Huntingdonshire (two members)	Viscount Mandeville	
Huntingdonshire (two members)	Lord Strathavon	
Hythe (two members)	John Loch	
Hythe (two members)	Stewart Marjoribanks	
== I ==
Constituency	MP	Party
Ilchester (two members)	Michael Bruce	Whig
Ilchester (two members)	James Joseph Hope-Vere	Whig
Inverness Burghs	John Baillie	Tory
Inverness-shire	Rt Hon. Charles Grant	Whig
Ipswich (two members)	Robert Adam Dundas	
Ipswich (two members)	Charles Mackinnon	
== K ==
Constituency	MP	Party
Kent (two members)	Sir Edward Knatchbull, Bt	Ultra-Tory
Kent (two members)	Thomas Law Hodges	Whig
Kerry (two members)	William Browne	
Kerry (two members)	Maurice Fitzgerald	Whig
Kildare (two members)	Lord William Charles O'Brien FitzGerald	Whig
Kildare (two members)	Richard More O'Ferrall	Whig
Kilkenny City	Nicholas Philpot Leader	Whig
County Kilkenny (two members)	Frederick Cavendish Ponsonby	
County Kilkenny (two members)	John Butler, Earl of Ossory	
Kincardineshire	Sir Hugh Arbuthnot	
King's County (two members)	Lord Oxmantown	
King's County (two members)	Thomas Bernard	
King's Lynn (two members)	John Walpole	
King's Lynn (two members)	Lord George Bentinck	Whig
Kingston upon Hull (two members)	George Schonswar	Tory
Kingston upon Hull (two members)	William Battie-Wrightson	Whig
Kinross-shire	No return - alternating constituency with Clackmannanshire	
Kinsale	John Russell	Whig
Kirkcudbright	Robert Cutlar Fergusson	
Knaresborough (two members)	Sir James Mackintosh	Whig
Knaresborough (two members)	Henry Brougham (Note: Brougham was re-elected at the general election in 1830 but was also returned for Yorkshire; he was elevated to the House of Lords before having chosen which constituency he would represent in the Commons)	Whig
== L ==
Constituency	MP	Party
Lanark Burghs	Henry Monteith	
Lanarkshire	Charles Douglas	
Lancashire (two members)	Lord Stanley	
Lancashire (two members)	John Wilson-Patten	Tory
Lancaster (two members)	John Fenton Cawthorne	Tory
Lancaster (two members)	Thomas Greene	Tory
Launceston (two members)	Sir James Willoughby Gordon	Tory
Launceston (two members)	James Brogden	Tory
Leicester (two members)	Sir Charles Abney-Hastings	
Leicester (two members)	William Evans	Whig
Leicestershire (two members)	Lord Robert William Manners	
Leicestershire (two members)	George Anthony Legh-Keck	
Leitrim (two members)	Samuel White	
Leitrim (two members)	John Marcus Clements	
Leominster (two members)	The Lord Hotham	
Leominster (two members)	William Marshall	
Lewes (two members)	Thomas Read Kemp	Whig
Lewes (two members)	John Shelley	
Lichfield (two members)	George Granville Venables Vernon	Whig
Lichfield (two members)	Sir George Anson	Whig
Limerick City	Thomas Spring Rice	Whig
County Limerick (two members)	Standish O'Grady	
County Limerick (two members)	Richard FitzGibbon	
Lincoln (two members)	John Fardell	
Lincoln (two members)	Charles Delaet Waldo Sibthorp	Ultra-Tory
Lincolnshire (two members)	Sir William Amcotts-Ingilby, Bt.	
Lincolnshire (two members)	Charles Chaplin	
Linlithgowshire	Sir Alexander Hope	
Lisburn	Henry Meynell	Tory
Liskeard (two members	Lord Eliot	Tory
Liskeard (two members	Sir William PringleTory	
Liverpool (two members)	Colonel Isaac Gascoyne	Tory
Liverpool (two members)	William Huskisson (Note: Killed by train 15 September 1830. replaced by William Ewart, November 1830)	Tory
The City London (four members)	William Thompson	Tory
The City London (four members)	Robert Waithman	Whig
The City London (four members)	William Ward	Tory
The City London (four members)	Sir Matthew Wood, Bt	Whig
Londonderry City	Sir Robert Alexander Ferguson, Bt (Note: Election declared void, 23 March 1831. Re-elected at by-election 2 April 1931)	Whig
County Londonderry (two members)	Theobald Jones	Tory
County Londonderry (two members)	Sir Robert Bateson, Bt	Tory
County Longford (two members)	Anthony Lefroy	
County Longford (two members)	Viscount Forbes	
Lostwithiel (two members)	Hon. William Vesey-FitzGerald (Note: Resigned and replaced 20 December 1830 by Viscount Valletort)	Tory
Lostwithiel (two members)	Edward Cust	Tory
County Louth (two members)	John McClintock	Tory
County Louth (two members)	Alexander Dawson	
Ludgershall (two members)	Edward Thomas Foley	Tory
Ludgershall (two members)	Sir Sandford Graham, 2nd Baronet	Whig
Ludlow (two members)	Viscount Clive	Tory
Ludlow (two members)	Robert Clive	
Lyme Regis (two members)	Hon. Henry Sutton Fane	Tory
Lyme Regis (two members)	John Thomas Fane	Tory
Lymington (two members)	William Egerton	
Lymington (two members)	George Burrard	
== M ==
Constituency	MP	Party
Maidstone (two members)	Abraham Wildey Robarts	Whig
Maidstone (two members)	Henry Winchester	
Maldon (two members)	Quintin Dick	Tory
Maldon (two members)	Thomas Barrett Lennard	Whig
Mallow	Sir Denham Jephson-Norreys, Bt	Whig
Malmesbury (two members)	Sir Charles Forbes, Bt	Tory
Malmesbury (two members)	John Forbes	Tory
Malton (two members)	John Charles Ramsden	Whig
Malton (two members)	Sir James Scarlett	Whig
Marlborough (two members)	Thomas Bucknall-Estcourt	Tory
Marlborough (two members)	William John Bankes	Tory
Mayo (two members)	James Browne	
Mayo (two members)	Dominick Browne	
Meath (two members)	Arthur Plunkett, Baron Killeen	
Meath (two members)	Sir Marcus Somerville, Bt	
Merioneth	Sir Robert Williames Vaughan	Tory
Middlesex (two members)	George Byng	Whig
Middlesex (two members)	Joseph Hume	Radical
Midhurst (two members)	John Abel Smith	
Midhurst (two members)	George Smith	
Midlothian	Sir George Clerk, Bt	Tory
Milborne Port (two members)	George Stevens Byng	Whig
Milborne Port (two members)	William Sturges-Bourne	Tory
Minehead (two members)	John Fownes Luttrell, junior	Tory
Minehead (two members)	William Edward Tomline	Tory
Mitchell (two members)	Hon. Lloyd Kenyon	Tory
Mitchell (two members)	John Heywood Hawkins	Whig
Monaghan (two members)	Cadwallader Blayney	Tory
Monaghan (two members)	Evelyn Shirley	
Monmouth Boroughs	Marquess of Worcester	Tory
Monmouthshire (two members)	Charles Gould Morgan	
Monmouthshire (two members)	Lord Granville Somerset	Tory
Montgomery	Henry Clive	
Montgomeryshire	Charles Williams-Wynn	
Morpeth (two members)	William Ord	Whig
Morpeth (two members)	Hon. William Howard	
== N ==
Constituency	MP	Party
Nairnshire	George Pryse Campbell (Note: Appointed a Groom of the Bedchamber in February 1831 and re-elected March 1831)	
Newark (two members)	Henry Willoughby (Note: Vacated seat and replaced 21 February 1831 by William Farnworth Handley)	Tory
Newark (two members)	Michael Thomas Sadler	Ultra-Tory
Newcastle-under-Lyme (two members)	Richardson Borradaile	Tory
Newcastle-under-Lyme (two members)	William Henry Miller	Whig
Newcastle-upon-Tyne (two members)	Sir Matthew White Ridley, Bt	Whig
Newcastle-upon-Tyne (two members)	John Hodgson	Tory
Newport (Cornwall) (two members)	John Doherty (Note: Appointed a judge and resigned, December 1930. Replaced by Sir Henry Hardinge)	Tory
Newport (Cornwall) (two members)	Jonathan Raine	Tory
Newport (IoW) (two members)	Spencer Perceval	Tory
Newport (IoW) (two members)	Horace Twiss	Tory
New Radnor	See Radnor	
New Ross	Charles Powell Leslie II	Tory
Newry	Hon. John Henry Knox	Tory
New Shoreham (two members)	Sir Charles Burrell, Bt	Tory
New Shoreham (two members)	Henry Howard	
Newton (two members)	Thomas Legh	
Newton (two members)	Thomas Houldsworth	
Newtown (IoW) (two members)	Hudson Gurney	Whig
Newtown (IoW) (two members)	Hon. Charles Anderson-Pelham	Whig
Norfolk (two members)	Thomas Coke	Whig
Norfolk (two members)	Sir William Ffolkes, Bt	Whig
Northallerton (two members)	Sir John Poo Beresford	Tory
Northallerton (two members)	Henry Lascelles	Tory
Northampton (two members)	Sir George Robinson, Bt.	
Northampton (two members)	Sir Robert Gunning, Bt	
Northamptonshire (two members)	Viscount Althorp	Whig
Northamptonshire (two members)	William Ralph Cartwright	Tory
Northumberland (two members)	Matthew Bell	Tory
Northumberland (two members)	Thomas Wentworth Beaumont	Whig
Norwich (two members)	Robert Grant	Whig
Norwich (two members)	Richard Hanbury Gurney	
Nottingham (two members)	Thomas Denman	Whig
Nottingham (two members)	Sir Ronald Craufurd Ferguson	Whig
Nottinghamshire (two members)	Frank Frank (or Sotheron)	Tory
Nottinghamshire (two members)	John Lumley	Whig
== O ==
Constituency	MP	Party
Okehampton (two members)	Lord Seymour	Tory
Okehampton (two members)	George James Welbore Agar-Ellis	Whig
Old Sarum (two members)	James Alexander	Tory
Old Sarum (two members)	Josias Alexander	Tory
Orford (two members)	Sir Henry Frederick Cooke	Tory
Orford (two members)	Spencer Kilderbee	Tory
Orkney and Shetland	George Traill	Whig
Oxford (two members)	James Haughton Langston	Whig
Oxford (two members)	William Hughes Hughes	
Oxfordshire (two members)	Lord Norreys	Tory
Oxfordshire (two members)	John Fane	Tory
Oxford University (two members)	Thomas Grimston Bucknall Estcourt	Tory
Oxford University (two members)	Sir Robert Harry Inglis, Bt	
== P ==
Constituency	MP	Party
Peeblesshire	Sir James Montgomery, Bt	
Pembroke	Hugh Owen Owen	Tory
Pembrokeshire	Sir John Owen, Bt	
Penryn (two members)	Sir Charles Lemon, Bt	Whig
Penryn (two members)	James William Freshfield	Tory
Perth Burghs	John Stuart-Wortley-Mackenzie (Note: Election declared void, 11 December 1830. By-Election Jan 1831)	
Perthshire	Sir George Murray	
Peterborough (two members)	Sir Robert Heron, Bt	Whig
Peterborough (two members)	Charles Wentworth-FitzWilliam, Viscount Milton (Note: Resigned and replaced 24 November 1830 by John Nicholas Fazakerley)	Whig
Petersfield (two members)	Sir William Jolliffe, Bt	
Petersfield (two members)	Gilbert East Jolliffe	
Plymouth (two members)	Sir George Cockburn, Bt	
Plymouth (two members)	Sir Thomas Byam Martin	
Plympton Erle (two members)	Viscount Valletort (Note: Resigned in order to contest Lostwithiel. Replaced 23 December 1830 by Sir Compton Domvile, Bt)	Tory
Plympton Erle (two members)	Gibbs Crawfurd Antrobus	Tory
Pontefract (two members)	Hon. Henry Stafford-Jerningham	Whig
Pontefract (two members)	Sir Culling Eardley Smith, Bt.	
Poole (two members)	Hon. William Ponsonby	
Poole (two members)	Benjamin Lester Lester	Whig
Portarlington	Sir Charles Ogle, Bt	Tory
Portsmouth (two members)	Sir Francis Baring, Bt	Whig
Portsmouth (two members)	John Bonham Carter	Whig
Preston (two members)	Edward Stanley (Note: Appointed Chief Secretary to Ireland. Replaced 17 December 1830 by Henry Hunt)	Whig
Preston (two members)	John Wood	Whig
== Q ==
Constituency	MP	Party
Queenborough (two members)	William Holmes (Note: Holmes and Durham were initially declared to have defeated Capel and Gladstone and took their seats, but on petition the result was reversed. Holmes had also been elected for Haslemere, and sat for that constituency for the rest of the Parliament)	Tory
Queenborough (two members)	Sir Philip Charles Henderson Durham (Note: Holmes and Durham were initially declared to have defeated Capel and Gladstone and took their seats, but on petition the result was reversed. Holmes had also been elected for Haslemere, and sat for that constituency for the rest of the Parliament)	Tory
Queen's County (two members)	Sir Charles Coote, Bt	
Queen's County (two members)	Sir Henry Parnell	
== R ==
Constituency	MP	Party
Radnor	Richard Price	Tory
Radnorshire	Thomas Frankland Lewis	Tory
Reading (two members)	Charles Russell	Tory
Reading (two members)	Charles Fyshe Palmer	Whig
Reigate (two members)	Sir Joseph Sydney Yorke	Tory
Reigate (two members)	James Cocks	
Renfrewshire	Sir Michael Shaw-Stewart, Bt	
Richmond (two members)	Hon. John Dundas	Whig
Richmond (two members)	Hon. Sir Robert Dundas	Whig
Ripon (two members)	Louis Hayes Petit	Tory
Ripon (two members)	George Spence	Tory
Rochester (two members)	Lord Villiers	
Rochester (two members)	Ralph Bernal	
Romney (two members)	Arthur Hill-Trevor	Ultra-Tory
Romney (two members)	William Miles	Ultra-Tory
Roscommon (two members)	Arthur French	
Roscommon (two members)	Owen O'Conor	
Ross-shire	Sir James Wemyss Mackenzie, 5th Baronet	
Roxburghshire	Henry Francis Hepburne-Scott	
Rutland (two members)	Sir Gerard Noel, Bt	Tory
Rutland (two members)	Sir Gilbert Heathcote, Bt	Whig
Rye (two members)	Hugh Duncan Baillie	
Rye (two members)	Francis Robert Bonham	
== S ==
Constituency	MP	Party
St Albans (two members)	Viscount Grimston	Tory
St Albans (two members)	Charles Tennant	Whig
St Germans (two members)	Charles Ross	Tory
St Germans (two members)	Sir Henry Hardinge (Note: Hardinge was also elected for Newport (Cornwall), which he chose to represent, and never sat for St Germans)	Tory
St Ives (two members)	William Pole-Tylney-Long-Wellesley	Ultra-Tory
St Ives (two members)	James Morrison (businessman)	
St Mawes (two members)	George Grenville Wandisford Pigott	Tory
St Mawes (two members)	Sir Codrington Carrington	Tory
Salisbury (two members)	Hon. Duncombe Pleydell-Bouverie	Whig
Salisbury (two members)	Wadham Wyndham	Tory
Saltash (two members)	Earl of Darlington	
Saltash (two members)	John Gregson	
Sandwich (two members)	Joseph Marryatt	Whig
Sandwich (two members)	Samuel Grove Price	
Scarborough (two members)	Charles Manners-Sutton	
Scarborough (two members)	Edmund Phipps	Tory
Seaford (two members)	John Fitzgerald	Tory
Seaford (two members)	Augustus Frederick Ellis	Tory
Selkirkshire	Alexander Pringle	
Shaftesbury (two members)	Edward Penrhyn	Whig
Shaftesbury (two members)	William Stratford Dugdale	Tory
Shrewsbury (two members)	Richard Jenkins	Tory
Shrewsbury (two members)	Robert Aglionby Slaney	Whig
Shropshire (two members)	John Cressett-Pelham	
Shropshire (two members)	Sir Rowland Hill, Bt	
Sligo	John Arthur Wynne	Tory
County Sligo (two members)	Edward Joshua Cooper	
County Sligo (two members)	Henry King	
Somerset (two members)	Edward Ayshford Sanford	Whig
Somerset (two members)	William Dickinson	Tory
Southampton (two members)	Abel Rous Dottin	
Southampton (two members)	James Barlow-Hoy	
Southwark (two members)	Sir Robert Wilson	Whig
Southwark (two members)	John Rawlinson Harris (Note: Harris died and was replaced 25 November 1830 by Charles Calvert.)	
Stafford (two members)	John Campbell	Whig
Stafford (two members)	Thomas Gisborne	Whig
Staffordshire (two members)	Edward Littleton	Whig
Staffordshire (two members)	Major-General Sir John Wrottesley	Whig
Stamford (two members)	Lord Thomas Cecil	Tory
Stamford (two members)	Thomas Chaplin	Tory
Steyning (two members)	George Richard Philips	Whig
Steyning (two members)	Edward Blount	Whig
Stirling Burghs	James Johnston	
Stirlingshire	Henry Home-Drummond	
Stockbridge (two members)	William Sloane-Stanley	Tory
Stockbridge (two members)	George Wilbraham	Whig
Sudbury (two members)	Sir John Benn Walsh	Tory
Sudbury (two members)	Bethel Walrond	
Suffolk (two members)	Sir Henry Bunbury, Bt	
Suffolk (two members)	Charles Tyrell	
Surrey (two members)	William Joseph Denison	Whig
Surrey (two members)	John Ivatt Briscoe	Whig
Sussex (two members)	Herbert Barrett Curteis	
Sussex (two members)	Walter Burrell	Tory
Sutherland	Lord Francis Leveson-Gower	
== T ==
Constituency	MP	Party
Tain Burghs	James Loch	Whig
Tamworth (two members)	Robert Peel	Tory
Tamworth (two members)	Lord Charles Townshend	
Taunton (two members)	Henry Labouchere	Whig
Taunton (two members)	Edward Thomas Bainbridge	Whig
Tavistock (two members)	Lord Russell	Whig
Tavistock (two members)	Viscount Ebrington (Note: Chose to sit for Devon. Replaced November 1830 by Lord John Russell)	Whig
Tewkesbury (two members)	John Edmund Dowdeswell	Tory
Tewkesbury (two members)	John Martin	Whig
Thetford (two members)	Lord James FitzRoy	Whig
Thetford (two members)	Hon. Francis Baring	Whig
Thirsk (two members)	Robert Frankland	Whig
Thirsk (two members)	Robert Greenhill-Russell	Whig
Tipperary (two members)	Francis Aldborough Prittie	
Tipperary (two members)	Thomas Wyse	
Tiverton (two members)	Viscount Sandon	Tory
Tiverton (two members)	Hon. Granville Ryder	Tory
Totnes (two members)	Charles Barry Baldwin	
Totnes (two members)	Thomas Courtenay	
Tralee	Robert Vernon Smith (Note: Appointed Lord Commissioner of the Treasury. Re-elected December 1830)	Whig
Tregony (two members)	James Adam Gordon	Tory
Tregony (two members)	James Mackillop	Tory
Truro (two members)	Viscount Encombe	Tory
Truro (two members)	Nathaniel William Peach	Tory
Tyrone (two members)	Hon. Henry Lowry-Corry	Tory
Tyrone (two members)	Sir Hugh Stewart, Bt	Tory
== W ==
Constituency	MP	Party
Wallingford (two members)	William Hughes	Whig
Wallingford (two members)	Robert Knight	Whig
Wareham (two members)	John Hales Calcraft	Whig
Wareham (two members)	James Ewing	Whig
Warwick (two members)	John Tomes	
Warwick (two members)	Hon. Sir Charles Greville	Tory
Warwickshire (two members)	Dugdale Stratford Dugdale	
Warwickshire (two members)	Francis Lawley	Whig
Waterford City	Sir John Newport, Bt.	Whig
County Waterford (two members)	Lord George Beresford	Tory
County Waterford (two members)	Daniel O'Connell	Irish Repeal
Wells (two members)	John Edwards-Vaughan	Tory
Wells (two members)	John Lee Lee	Whig
Wendover (two members)	Samuel Smith	Tory
Wendover (two members)	Abel Smith	Tory
Wenlock (two members)	Hon. George Weld-Forester	Tory
Wenlock (two members)	Paul Beilby Thompson	Whig
Weobley (two members)	Lord Henry Thynne	Tory
Weobley (two members)	Lord William Thynne	Tory
Westbury (two members)	Sir Alexander Cray Grant, Bt	Tory
Westbury (two members)	Michael George Prendergast	Tory
Westmeath (two members)	Gustavus Rochfort	Tory
Westmeath (two members)	Sir Montagu Lowther Chapman, Bt	Whig
West Looe (two members)	Charles Buller	Whig
West Looe (two members)	Sir Charles Hulse	Tory
Westminster (two members)	Sir Francis Burdett, Bt	Whig
Westminster (two members)	Sir John Cam Hobhouse, Bt	Whig
Westmorland (two members)	Henry Cecil Lowther	Tory
Westmorland (two members)	Viscount Lowther	Tory
Wexford	William Wigram (Note: Unseated on petition-replaced February, 1831 by Sir Edward Cholmeley Dering, 8th Baronet)	Tory
County Wexford (two members)	Arthur Chichester	
County Wexford (two members)	Viscount Valentia	
Weymouth and Melcombe Regis (four members)	Colonel John Gordon	Tory
Weymouth and Melcombe Regis (four members)	Thomas Fowell Buxton	Whig
Weymouth and Melcombe Regis (four members)	Edward Sugden	Tory
Weymouth and Melcombe Regis (four members)	Masterton Ure	Tory
Whitchurch (two members)	Hon. John Robert Townshend	Tory
Whitchurch (two members)	Sir Samuel Scott, Bt	Tory
Wicklow (two members)	Sir Ralph Howard, Bt	Whig
Wicklow (two members)	James Grattan	Whig
Wigan (two members)	James Alexander Hodson	Tory
Wigan (two members)	Lieutenant-Colonel James Lindsay	Tory
Wigtown Burghs	John Henry Lowther	Tory
Wigtownshire	Sir Andrew Agnew, Bt	Whig
Wilton (two members)	Henry Bulwer	
Wilton (two members)	John Hungerford Penruddocke	Tory
Wiltshire (two members)	John Benett	
Wiltshire (two members)	Sir John Dugdale Astley, Bt	
Winchelsea (two members)	John WilliamsWhig	
Winchelsea (two members)	Henry Dundas	Tory
Winchester (two members)	Sir Edward Hyde East, Bt	
Winchester (two members)	Paulet St John-Mildmay	
Windsor (two members)	Sir Richard Hussey Vivian (Note: Resigned and replaced 10 February 1831 by Edward Stanley)	Whig
Windsor (two members)	John Ramsbottom, junior	Whig
Woodstock (two members)	The Marquess of Blandford	Ultra-Tory
Woodstock (two members)	Lord Charles Spencer-Churchill	Tory
Wootton Bassett (two members)	Viscount Mahon	Tory
Wootton Bassett (two members)	Thomas Hyde Villiers	Whig
Worcester (two members)	Thomas Henry Hastings Davies	Whig
Worcester (two members)	George Richard Robinson	Whig
Worcestershire (two members)	Thomas Foley	Whig
Worcestershire (two members)	Henry Lygon	
Wycombe (two members)	Sir Thomas Baring, Bt	
Wycombe (two members)	Sir John Dashwood-King, Bt	Tory
== Y ==
Constituency	MP	Party
Yarmouth (Isle of Wight) (two members)	William Yates Peel	Tory
Yarmouth (Isle of Wight) (two members)	George Lowther Thompson	Tory
Yarmouth (Norfolk)	See Great Yarmouth	
York (two members)	Hon. Thomas Dundas	Whig
York (two members)	Samuel Adlam Bayntun	Tory
Yorkshire (four members)	Viscount Morpeth	Whig
Yorkshire (four members)	William Duncombe	Ultra-Tory
Yorkshire (four members)	Richard Bethell	Tory
Yorkshire (four members)	Henry Brougham (Note: Brougham was also elected for Knaresborough; he was elevated to the House of Lords before having chosen which constituency he would represent in the Commons)	Whig
Youghal	Hon. George Ponsonby	Whig

== See also ==
- 1830 United Kingdom general election
- List of United Kingdom by-elections (1818–1832)
- List of parliaments of the United Kingdom
