= Van Homrigh =

Van Homrigh is a surname of Dutch origin. It may refer to a number of Irish people, including:

- Bartholomew Van Homrigh (d. 1703), Irish merchant, estate agent and politician
- Esther Van Homrigh (1688–1723), Irish poet
- Peter Van Homrigh (1768–1831), Irish politician

== See also ==
- Homrighausen
