= John Hanmer, 1st Baron Hanmer =

British politician

John Hanmer, 1st Baron Hanmer (22 December 1809 – 8 March 1881), known as Sir John Hanmer, Bt, between 1828 and 1872, was a British politician.

== Background and education ==
Hanmer was the son of Thomas Hanmer, eldest son of Sir Thomas Hanmer, 2nd Baronet. His mother was Arabella Charlotte, daughter of T. S. D. Bucknell. He was educated at Eton and Christ Church, Oxford. In 1828, he succeeded his grandfather as third Baronet.

== Political career ==
Hanmer sat as Member of Parliament for Shrewsbury between 1832 and 1837, for Kingston upon Hull between 1841 and 1847 and for Flint Boroughs between 1847 and 1872. He also served as High Sheriff of Flintshire for 1832. In 1872 he was raised to the peerage as Baron Hanmer, of Hanmer, and of Flint, both in the County of Flint.

== Family ==
Lord Hanmer married Georgiana Chetwynd, daughter of Sir George Chetwynd, 2nd Baronet, in 1833. There were no children from the marriage. Lady Hanmer died in March 1880. Lord Hanmer died in March 1881, aged 71, and was buried at Bettisfield, Flintshire. The barony became extinct on his death while he was succeeded in the baronetcy by his younger brother, Wyndham.

Parliament of the United Kingdom
Preceded by Robert Aglionby Slaney; Richard Jenkins	Member of Parliament for Shrewsbury; 1832–1837; With: Robert Aglionby Slaney 1832–1835; John Cressett-Pelham 1835–1837	Succeeded by Richard Jenkins; Robert Aglionby Slaney
Preceded by Sir Walter James, Bt; William Hutt	Member of Parliament for Kingston upon Hull; 1841–1847; With: Sir Walter James, Bt	Succeeded by Matthew Talbot Baines; James Clay
Preceded by Sir Richard Williams-Bulkeley, Bt	Member of Parliament for Flint Boroughs; 1847–1872	Succeeded by Sir Robert Cunliffe
Peerage of the United Kingdom
New creation	Baron Hanmer; 1872–1881	Extinct
Baronetage of Great Britain
Preceded by Thomas Hanmer	Baronet (of Hanmer); 1828–1881	Succeeded by Wyndham Edward Hanmer
