= Robert Aglionby Slaney =

British barrister and Whig politician

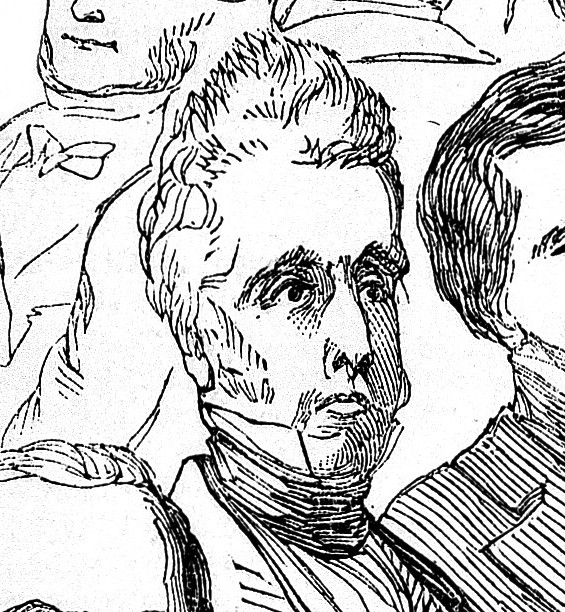

Member of the British Parliament for Shrewsbury
- In office 1826–1834
- In office 1837–1841
- In office 1847–1852
- In office 1857–1862

Personal details
- Born: 9 June 1791
- Died: 19 May 1862 (aged 70)
- Party: Whig
- Spouses: Elizabeth Muckleston (m. 1812–1847); Catherine Anne Archer (m. 1854)
- Children: 3
- Education: Trinity College, Cambridge
- Occupation: barrister

Robert Aglionby Slaney (9 June 1791 – 19 May 1862) was a British barrister and Whig politician from Shropshire. He sat in the House of Commons as a Member of Parliament for the borough of Shrewsbury for most of the period from 1826 until his death in 1862.

== Early life ==
Slaney was the eldest son of Robert Slaney (1764–1834) of Hatton Grange, Shropshire, and his wife, Mary, daughter of Thomas Mason of Shrewsbury. He was educated at Trinity College, Cambridge, and was called to the bar in 1817 at Lincoln's Inn. He succeeded to his father's Hatton Grange estates in 1834.

== Career ==
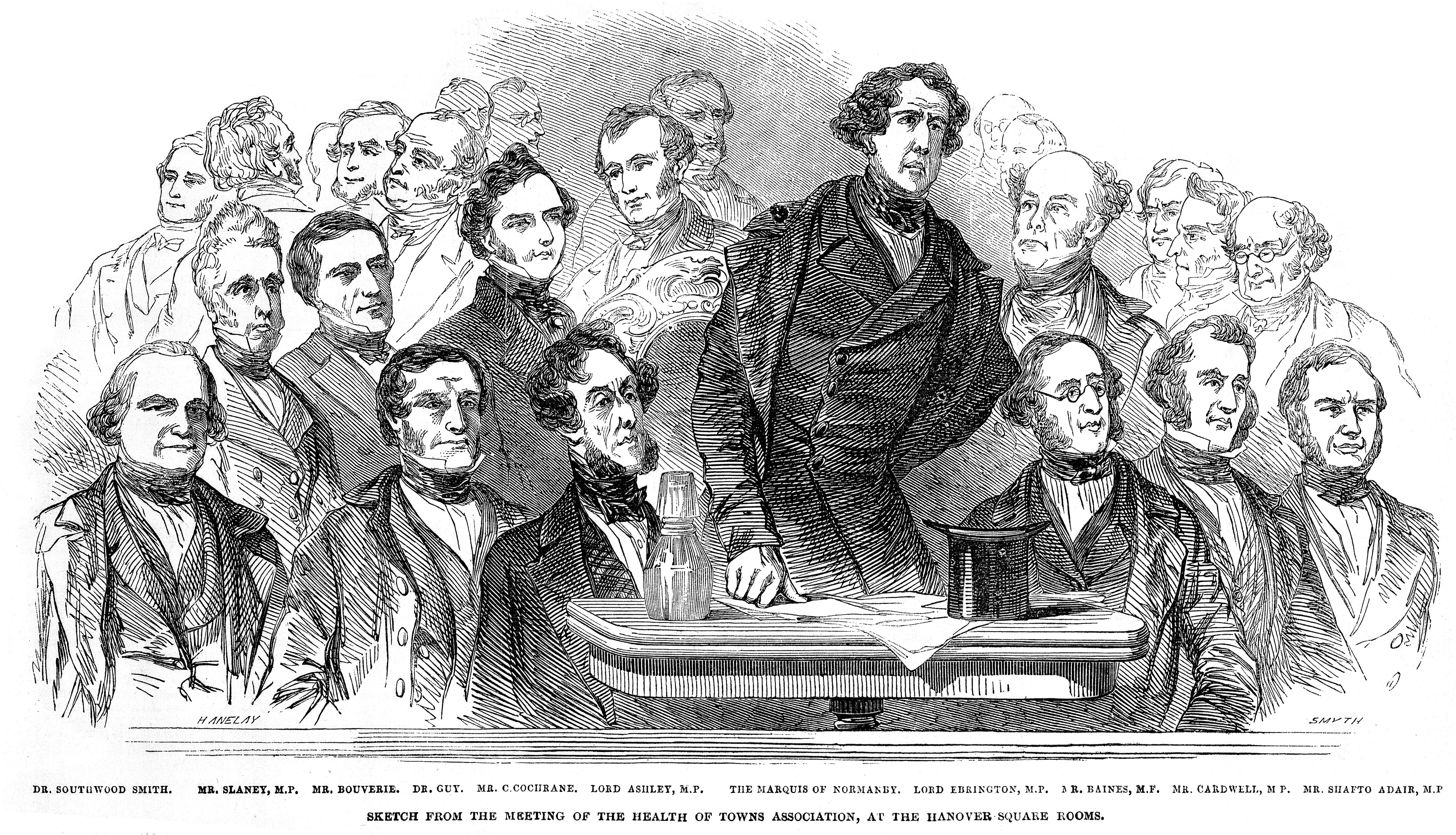
Health of Towns Association Meeting, 1847. Slaney 2nd left

He was first elected at the 1826 general election, and was re-elected at the next three general elections, until his defeat at the 1835 general election by the Conservative Party candidate John Cressett-Pelham. He was re-elected in 1837, but did not stand in 1841, when the seat was won by Benjamin Disraeli. He won the seat again in 1847, but did not stand in 1852. He was High Sheriff of Shropshire in 1854.

Slaney was returned again at the 1857 general election, re-elected in 1859, and held the seat until his death, aged 70.

Among other achievements, Slaney was instrumental in setting up the Select Committee on Public Health of 1840, which paved the way for the later Board of Health; and in fostering the Industrial and Provident Societies Partnership Act 1852, sometimes known as Slaney's Act. He served as commissioner "on the health of towns" from 1843 to 1848, and was particularly noted for his efforts to improve living conditions in urban industrial areas.

Attending the opening of the London International Exhibition on 1 May 1862, he fell through a gap in a platform floor and injured his right leg, despite which he continued to view the exhibition and attended Parliament up until the 8th. He died on 19 May 1862, at his London house in Mayfair, from gangrene (then reported as 'mortification') that set in.

== Family ==
His residence was listed in 1857 as Walford Manor, Shropshire. He married twice: in 1812 to Elizabeth Muckleston, and in 1854 to Catherine Anne Archer. Slaney had three daughters, amongst whom his estate was shared. The youngest, Frances Catherine, married William Kenyon, who as a condition of Slaney's will took the additional surname of Slaney. The eldest, Elizabeth Frances (died c. 1870), married the naturalist Thomas Campbell Eyton, a Deputy Lieutenant of Shropshire.

== Archives ==
A collection of letters sent to Slanley are held at the Cadbury Research Library, University of Birmingham. This archive collection also includes correspondence of his son-in-law, Thomas Campbell Eyton, and other family members.

Parliament of the United Kingdom
Preceded by Henry Grey Bennet; Panton Corbett	Member of Parliament for Shrewsbury; 1826–1835; With: Panton Corbett to 1830; Richard Jenkins 1830–1832; Sir John Hanmer from 1832	Succeeded by John Cressett-Pelham; Sir John Hanmer
Preceded by John Cressett-Pelham; Sir John Hanmer	Member of Parliament for Shrewsbury; 1837–1841; With: Richard Jenkins	Succeeded by Benjamin Disraeli; George Tomline
Preceded by Benjamin Disraeli; George Tomline	Member of Parliament for Shrewsbury; 1847–1852; With: Edward Baldock	Succeeded by Edward Baldock; George Tomline
Preceded by Edward Baldock; George Tomline	Member of Parliament for Shrewsbury; 1857–1862; With: George Tomline	Succeeded by Henry Robertson; George Tomline
Honorary titles
Preceded by Algernon Charles Heber-Percy	High Sheriff of Shropshire; 1854	Succeeded by Willoughby Hurt Sitwell
