= Richard Jenkins (MP) =

British businessman and politician

Sir Richard Jenkins GCB JP DL FRS (18 February 1785 – 30 December 1853) was member of parliament for Shrewsbury from 1830 to 1832 and from 1837 to 1841. He was also Chairman of the East India Company in 1839.

== Personal life ==
Richard Jenkins was born at Cruckton, near Shrewsbury, the eldest son of Richard Jenkins of Bicton Hall, Shropshire. He married Elizabeth Helen, daughter of Hugh Spottiswoode, of the Honourable East India Company Civil Service, in 1824 and was the father of Colonel Richard Jenkins of the 1st Bengal Cavalry, two other sons and two daughters.

== Career ==
Jenkins was at the Battle of Seetabuldee and also the capture of Nagpur. He served in the Bombay Civil Service from 1800 to 1828 and was the British Resident at Nagpur from 1807 to 1827. He was an East India Company Director from 1832 to 1853.

== Honours ==
Sir Richard was invested as a Knight Grand Cross of the Order of the Bath (GCB) in 1838, and awarded the Third Mahratta War medal.

He was elected a Fellow of the Royal Geographical Society and, in 1841, a Fellow of the Royal Society, for which his candidature citation read that he was a deserving applicant for his "Eminence as a Political Character in India; for his acquaintance with Oriental Literature; for his variable reports to the Government of India; & for his administration of the affairs of Berar"

== Death ==
Jenkins died at Gothic Cottage, Blackheath, London, in 1853 aged 68 and was buried in Shropshire at Bicton.

Parliament of the United Kingdom
| Preceded by Panton Corbett; Robert Aglionby Slaney | Member of Parliament for Shrewsbury; 1830–1832; With: Robert Aglionby Slaney | Succeeded by Robert Aglionby Slaney; Sir John Hanmer |
| Preceded by John Cressett-Pelham; Sir John Hanmer | Member of Parliament for Shrewsbury; 1837–1841; With: Robert Aglionby Slaney | Succeeded by George Tomline; Benjamin Disraeli |
