= Wilson Roberts =

English politician (1770 - 1853)

Member of Parliament for Bewdley
- In office 19 June 1818 – 12 December 1832
- Preceded by: Charles Wilsonn
- Succeeded by: Thomas Winnington

Personal details
- Born: 23 June 1770
- Died: 28 November 1853 (aged 83) Bewdley, Worcestershire
- Resting place: Dowles churchyard, Worcestershire
- Party: Tory
- Education: Christ Church, Oxford

Wilson Aylesbury Roberts (23 June 1770 – 28 November 1853) was an English politician who was Member of Parliament for Bewdley.

== Biography ==
His great-grandfather settled in Droitwich at the start of the eighteenth century from Cornwall. He was High Sheriff of Worcestershire from 1837 to 1838.

== See also ==
- List of MPs elected in the 1818 United Kingdom general election
- List of MPs elected in the 1820 United Kingdom general election
- List of MPs elected in the 1826 United Kingdom general election
- List of MPs elected in the 1830 United Kingdom general election
- List of MPs elected in the 1831 United Kingdom general election
