= Panton Corbett =

English Tory politician

Panton Corbett (c. March 1785 – 22 November 1855) was an English Tory politician from Shropshire.

He was born Panton Plymley, son of Joseph Plymley (later Archdeacon of Shropshire) who took the surname Corbett in 1804.

His family was a branch of the Norman Corbet family of Caus. Panton Corbett lived at Longnor Hall in Shropshire and Leighton Hall in Montgomeryshire.

He was elected at the 1820 general election as a Member of Parliament (MP) for Shrewsbury, having contested the seat unsuccessfully at a by-election in May 1819. He was re-elected in 1826, but was defeated at the 1830 general election.

He was High Sheriff of Shropshire in 1849.

His oldest surviving son Edward Corbett (1817–1895) was MP for South Shropshire from 1868 to 1877.

Parliament of the United Kingdom
Preceded by John Mytton; Henry Grey Bennet	Member of Parliament for Shrewsbury; 1820 – 1830; With: Henry Grey Bennet to 1826; Robert Aglionby Slaney from 1826	Succeeded by Richard Jenkins; Robert Aglionby Slaney
