= John Henry North =

Irish barrister, judge and MP

Member of Parliament for Plympton Erle
- In office 1824–1826 Serving with William Gill Paxton
- Preceded by: Ranald George Macdonald; William Gill Paxton
- Succeeded by: George Edgcumbe; Gibbs Crawfurd Antrobus

Member of Parliament for Milborne Port
- In office 1827–1830 Serving with Arthur Chichester
- Preceded by: Thomas North Graves
- Succeeded by: William Sturges-Bourne; George Stevens Byng

Member of Parliament for Drogheda
- In office 1830–1831
- Preceded by: Peter Van Homrigh
- Succeeded by: Thomas Wallace

Personal details
- Born: c. 1788
- Died: 29 September 1831
- Resting place: St Mary's Church, Harrow-on-the-Hill, England
- Political party: Tory

John Henry North (c. 1788 – 29 September 1831) was an Irish barrister, judge and Canningite Tory Member of Parliament (MP) in the United Kingdom Parliament.

== Early life ==
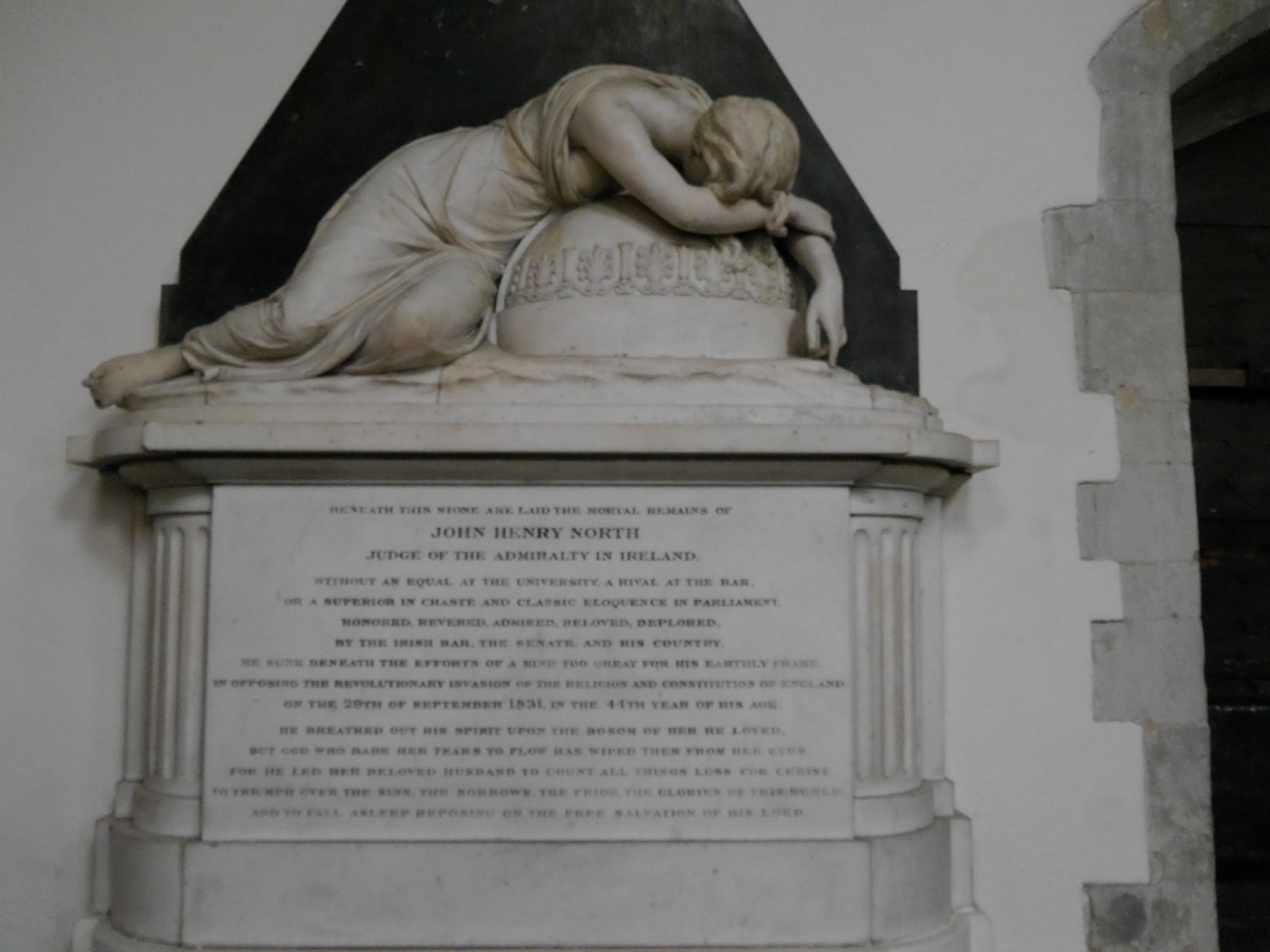
Memorial, St Mary's, Harrow on the Hill

The son of Richard North and Lucinda North (née Gouldsbury) of Tyrrellspass, County Westmeath. His father was a military officer who died while he was still young.

After his father's death, John Henry North was educated by his maternal uncle, the Revd John Henry Gouldsbury and at Trinity College, Dublin where he achieved great academic success. He was called to the Irish Bar (King's Inns) in 1809. He took silk in 1824. On 2 December 1818 he married Letitia Foster, daughter of William Foster, Bishop of Clogher and niece of John Foster, 1st Baron Oriel.

From 1818 until his death, his home in Dublin was 31 Merrion Square, South.

== Career ==
In 1815, North came to public attention as the barrister defending the proprietor of the Dublin Evening Post in a libel trial in which the freedom of the press was questioned. Although the jury found for the plaintiff, minimal damages were awarded and North's reputation was enhanced.

In 1819, soon after his marriage, North expressed an interest in becoming MP for Drogheda, County Louth, but was discouraged by his wife's cousin, Thomas Skeffington, who had been MP there from 1807 to 1812, who warned him of the likely expense.

Instead he focused on the becoming a candidate for the Dublin University seat, anticipating the departure of the sitting member, W. C. Plunket who was expected soon to be made Chief Justice of the Irish Common Pleas. When this did not happen, North began his active involvement with the Kildare Place Society for Promoting the Education of the Poor of Ireland. In February 1820 he took part in a public debate against Daniel O’Connell about whether the Society did, as its principles and objects asserted, "afford the same facilities for education for every denomination of Christians". The Society resolved not to investigate the matter and O’Connell resigned, condemning the Society as "sectarian".

Two years later, following the unexpected death of the sitting member, there appeared to be an opportunity for John Henry North to stand for election in Drogheda. His sister-in-law, Countess de Salis promoted him and offered financial assistance, but her cousin, Thomas Skeffington had already committed to promoting Robert Pentland, the son of his friend, George Pentland. A row ensued and the Countess and North were forced to withdraw from what North was later to describe as an "embarrassing and disagreeable affair".

In February 1823, North was the barrister called to defend a group of loyalists who were alleged to have thrown a bottle at the Lord Lieutenant of Ireland, Marquess Wellesley, in a Dublin theatre. Much to the embarrassment of the government, and to loud cheers from loyalist supporters, the jury failed to reach a verdict. North's college rival, Richard Sheil, acknowledged that he discharged his duty as defending counsel ‘with great talent and ... consummate boldness’.

At Canning's behest, in March 1824 he was brought into parliament as member for Plympton Erle, a rotten borough in the Earl of Mount Edgcumbe's interest, but at the general election in 1826 the seat was taken back by the Edgcumbe family.

Left without a seat, in 1826 he renewed his bid for the Dublin University seat and assisted his brother-in-law John Leslie Foster's election to represent County Louth in June.

Throughout this time he had been waiting in the wings for the Dublin University seat, which was still expected to become vacant, now upon the anticipated elevation to the peerage of the incumbent, W. C. Plunket. This happened, eventually, in April 1827, but at the election which took place in May, North was beaten into second place by John Wilson Croker.

However, in July 1827, North was brought back to parliament by Canning as representative for Milborne Port, a small borough under the Marquess of Anglesey's influence.

At the same time he continued to develop his practice at the Bar, which included representing Anne M'Garahan, (the daughter of a 'low innkeeper') who, in a widely reported case, was alleged to have been seduced by Revd Thomas Maguire, a Catholic priest who was represented by Daniel O'Connell and Richard Sheil.

After Canning's death, Lord Anglesey joined the Whigs and at the general election of 1830, North was obliged to vacate his seat at Milborne Port.

In 1830 he stood again for Dublin University where he split the vote and fell to third place. At the same time stood as a candidate in Drogheda where he was elected, defeating Daniel O'Connell's son, Maurice, and relying largely on the support of the non-resident freemen of the borough.

On the eve of the poll for Dublin University he was appointed Judge of the Admiralty in Ireland, following the removal from office of the previous incumbent, Sir Jonah Barrington.

In parliament he supported Catholic emancipation but abhorred the proposed Reform Bill which he saw as a revolutionary measure.

He died while the Reform Bill was still going through the House of Commons, on 29 September 1831 and is buried in St Mary's Church, Harrow-on-the-Hill where a memorial (attributed to Humphrey Hopper) bears the inscription:

"JOHN HENRY NORTH,
Judge of the Admiralty in Ireland.
Without an equal at the University, a rival at the Bar,
Or a superior in chaste and classic eloquence in Parliament.
Honoured, Revered, Admired, Beloved, Deplored,
By the Irish Bar, the Senate and his country,
He sunk beneath the efforts of a mind too great for His earthly frame,
In opposing the Revolutionary Invasion of the Religion and Constitution of England,
On the 29th of September, 1831, in the 44th year of his age."

Parliament of the United Kingdom
Preceded by Ranald George Macdonald; William Gill Paxton	Member of Parliament for Plympton Erle; 1824–1826; With: William Gill Paxton	Succeeded by George Edgcumbe; Gibbs Crawfurd Antrobus
Preceded by Thomas North Graves	Member of Parliament for Milborne Port; 1827–1830; With: Arthur Chichester	Succeeded by William Sturges-Bourne and George Stevens Byng
Preceded by Peter Van Homrigh	Member of Parliament for Drogheda; 1830–1831	Succeeded by Thomas Wallace
