= Peter Van Homrigh =

Irish politician (1768–1831)

Member of Parliament for Drogheda
- In office 14 November 1826 – 26 July 1830
- Preceded by: William Meade Smyth
- Succeeded by: John Henry North

Personal details
- Born: 1768
- Died: 5 March 1831 (aged 62–63) Drogheda, County Louth
- Party: Tory

Peter Van Homrigh (1768 – 5 March 1831) was an Irish politician in the 19th century. He was elected member of parliament for Drogheda in County Louth in the 1826 general election.

== Family ==
Van Homrigh was of Dutch descent, believed to be descended from Bartholomew Van Homrigh, who was Lord Mayor of Dublin and twice MP for Londonderry City in William III's Irish Parliaments.

== See also ==
- List of MPs elected in the 1826 United Kingdom general election
