= Homrighausen =

Homrighausen is a family name that originated in the area of Berleburg in what is now the district of Siegen-Wittgenstein in Germany.

The village of Homrighausen was never more than a small hamlet north and slightly west of the town of Berleburg. Its first documented mention was in 1502 as Homerchusen. However, the settlement is probably much older than that. Scholarly opinion is that place names ending in -hausen in Wittgenstein originated in the period 950-1150. "-hausen" simply meant a settlement of houses, and it is believed that "Homrig" emerged from the words for a high hill--hohen Berg in German.

In 1606, Graf Georg relocated the peasant families living at Homrighausen to other villages to have full use of the land. An impressive forest house was erected there around 1770. It is now part of the city of Bad Berleburg

The family name of Homrighausen is found in several nearby villages by the 16th century, but no one has been able to link these early branches back to a common ancestor. Besides the town of Berleburg itself, the Homrighausen name was and is common in the villages of Wunderthausen, Diedenshausen, Wemlighausen and Girkhausen, among others. At present, around 300 families by this name live in Germany, and more than half are in Siegen-Wittgenstein. A similar number live in the United States.

Homrighausens from Wittgenstein – as well as some a generation or two removed – came to America at various times beginning as early as 1748 Important points of settlement during the 19th century included Wheatland, Iowa, and Paola, Kansas. In the case of the earlier settlers, the name was often modified. "Hummerickhouse" is an example.

One prominent American with this name was the Rev. Dr. Elmer G. Homrighausen (1900–1982), a theologian and professor at the Princeton seminary.

Another American Homrighausen was the Rev. Dr. Edgar William Homrighausen (1924-2017). This theologian, parish pastor and President of the Southern District of Lutheran Church Missouri Synod from 1957-1969, led his District (Alabama, Mississippi, Louisiana and the Panhandle of Florida) through the Civil Rights Movement of the 1960s.

== Genealogy ==
More than 50 Homrighausens are known to have emigrated directly from Wunderthausen or Diedenshausen to the United States. There were certainly others.

| Name | To America | Birth | Death | Settlement |
|---|---|---|---|---|
| Maria Catherine Homrighausen | 1748 | 1721 Diedenshausen | 1801 | Pennsylvania |
| Elisabeth Gertraud Homrighausen | 1748 | 1724 Diedenshausen | | Pennsylvania |
| Anna Gertraud Homrighausen | 1748 | 1724 Diedenshausen | | Pennsylvania |
| Anna Maria Magdalena Homrighausen | 1748 | 1728 Diedenshausen | | Pennsylvania |
| Johann Antoniy Homrighausen | 1748 | 1722 Diedenshausen | | Pennsylvania |
| Johann Wilhelm Homrighausen | 1796 | 1771 Diedenshausen | | Baltimore |
| Georg Wilhelm Homrighausen | 1818 | 1782 Diedenshausen | | Baltimore |
| Katharina Wilhelmina Homrighausen | 1818 | 1807 Diedenshausen | | Baltimore |
| Katharina Elisabeth Homrighausen | 1818 | 1810 Diedenshausen | | Baltimore |
| Johann Georg Friedrich Homrighausen | 1818 | 1813 Diedenshausen | | Baltimore |
| Anna Elisabeth Homrighausen | 1818 | 1814 Diedenshausen | | Baltimore |
| Johannes Homrighausen | 1818 | 1816 Diedenshausen | | Baltimore |
| Johann Daniel Homrighausen | 1818 | 1817 Diedenshausen | | Baltimore |
| Johann Philipp Homrighausen (Hummerickhouse in USA) | Abt. 1832 | 1785 Diedenshausen | 1860 | Ohio |
| Johannes Homrighausen | 1866 | 1797 Wunderthausen | 1870 | Wheatland, Iowa |
| (Johann) Franz Homrighausen | 1845 | 1814 Wunderthausen | 1907 | Wheatland, Iowa |
| Johannes Homrighausen | 1839 | 1819 Wunderthausen | 1898 | Red Bud, Illinois |
| Johann Heinrich Homrighausen | 1839 | 1822 Wunderthausen | 1881 | Red Bud, Illinois |
| Johann Heinrich Homrighausen | 1864 | 1827 Wunderthausen | 1893 | Wheatland, Iowa |
| Johann Philipp Homrighausen | 1871 | 1828 Diedenshausen | 1904 | Wheatland, Iowa |
| Katharine Wilhelmine Homrighausen | 1871 | 1856 Diedenshausen | 1941 | Wheatland, Iowa |
| Johann Philipp Homrighausen, Jr. | 1871 | 1860 Diedenshausen | | |
| Maria Katharina Homrighausen | 1871 | 1867 Diedenshausen | 1947 | Wheatland, Iowa |
| Georg Heinrich Homrighausen | 1871 | 1871 Diedenshausen | 1959 | Wheatland, Iowa |
| (Elisabeth) Amalia Homrighausen | 1854 | 1828 Wunderthausen | 1918 | Paola, Kansas |
| (Georg) Ludwig Homrighausen | 1882 | 1828 Wunderthausen | 1914 | Osawatomie, Kansas |
| (Johann) Philipp Homrighausen | 1871 | 1828 Wunderthausen | 1904 | Wheatland, Iowa |
| (Johann) Georg Homrighausen | 1866 | 1829 Wunderthausen | | |
| (Johann) Ludwig Homrighausen | 1866 | 1832 Wunderthausen | 1886 | Wheatland, Iowa |
| Georg Ludwig Homrighausen | 1854 | 1832 Wunderthausen | 1894 | Milwaukee, Wisconsin |
| (Johann) Georg Homrighausen | 1854 | 1833 Wunderthausen | 1910 | Paola, Kansas; Willcox, Arizona |
| Maria Elisabeth Homrighausen | 1857 | 1835 Wunderthausen | 1871 | Wheatland, Iowa |
| (Johann) Georg Homrighausen | 1868 | 1835 Wunderthausen | 1909? | |
| Johannes Homrighausen | 1857 | 1838 Wunderthausen | 1878 | Wheatland, Iowa |
| Maria Elisabeth Homrighausen | 1865 | 1840 Wunderthausen | 1926 | Paola, Kansas |
| (Georg) Franz Homrighausen | 1867 | 1840 Wunderthausen | 1916 | Missouri |
| Ludwig Heinrich Homrighausen | 1866 | 1843 Wunderthausen | 1913 | Probably Missouri |
| Anna Elisabeth Homrighausen | 1866 | 1846 Wunderthausen | 1919 | Jackson County, Missouri |
| Maria Catherine Homrighausen | 1860 | 1846 Wunderthausen | 1914 | Miami County, Kansas |
| Johann Georg Homrighausen | ?? | 1848 Wunderthausen | | |
| Georg Ludwig Homrighausen | 1866 | 1848 Wunderthausen | | |
| Maria Elisabeth Homrighausen | Abt 1873 | 1850 Wunderthausen | | Prob. New Jersey |
| Catherine Homrighausen | 1871 | 1853 Wunderthausen | 1939 | Osawatomie, Kansas |
| Heinrich Homrighausen | 1885 | 1854 Wunderthausen | 1926 | Miami County, Kansas |
| (Katherine) Wilhelmine Homrighausen | 1871 | 1856 Wunderthausen | 1941 | Wheatland, Iowa |
| Ludwig Heinrich Homrighausen | 1881 | 1858 Wunderthausen | 1932 | Marsland, Nebraska |
| Dina Homrighausen | 1885 | 1858 Wunderthausen | 1914 | Miami County, Kansas |
| Anna Elisabeth Homrighausen | 1882 | 1862 Wunderthausen | | Prob. Miami County, Kansas |
| (Maria) Amalia Homrighausen | 1879 | 1864 Wunderthausen | 1932 | Miami County, Kansas |
| (Johann) Friedrich Homrighausen | 1883 | 1864 Wunderthausen | Aft. 1930 | Kansas |
| Johann Heinrich Homrighausen [George] | ?? | 1867 Wunderthausen | | Kansas |
| (Maria) Katherine Homrighausen | 1871 | 1867 Wunderthausen | 1947 | Wheatland, Iowa |
| (Ludwig) Heinrich Homrighausen | 1882 | 1869 Wunderthausen | 1905 | Osawatomie, Kansas |
| Heinrich Homrighausen | 1886 | 1880 Wunderthausen | | Kansas |
| Dina Homrighausen | 1886 | 1882 Wunderthausen | | Kansas |
| Georg Homrighausen | 1886 | 1884 Wunderthausen | | Kansas |

Principal Sources:

- Wunderthausen: Mehr als 700 Jahre bewegter Geschichte. 2006, Wunderthausen
- 800 Jahre Diedenshausen: Geschichte des Dorfes und seiner Familien Diedenshausen, 1997
- . Paul Riedesel.
