= Gibbs Antrobus =

British diplomat and politician

Gibbs Crawfurd Antrobus
- Born: 17 June 1793
- Died: 21 May 1861 (aged 67)
- Occupations: Diplomat and politician

Gibbs Crawfurd Antrobus JP DL (17 June 1793 – 21 May 1861) was a British diplomat and politician.

== Biography ==
The brother of Sir Edmund Antrobus, 2nd Baronet, Antrobus's wealthy family were long-established in Congleton, Cheshire. His mother died giving birth to him, and his father died later of a riding accident, having been in a coma since before his son's birth. He was educated at Eton, at St John's College, Cambridge, and then at Lincoln's Inn. He married firstly, on 25 June 1827, Jane Trotter (who died on 24 November 1829), daughter of Sir Coutts Trotter, 1st Baronet, of Westerville, Lincolnshire, and secondly, on 12 January 1832, Charlotte, daughter of Sir Edward Crofton, 3rd baronet, of Mote, County Roscommon.

In 1816 he joined the diplomatic service, serving in the United States until 1821.

In the general election in 1820 he was elected in his absence as a Member of Parliament (MP) for the rotten borough of Aldborough, in the interest of the Duke of Newcastle.

In the 1826 election he was returned for the rotten borough of Plympton Erle, as a paying guest of the Treby family who controlled the borough. He held the seat until the 1832 general election, when the borough was disenfranchised under the Reform Act.

He was Sheriff of Cheshire from 1834 to 1835.

Parliament of the United Kingdom
Preceded by Granville Harcourt-Vernon; Henry Fynes	Member of Parliament for Aldborough; 1820–1826; With: Henry Fynes	Succeeded by Clinton James Fynes Clinton; Sir Alexander Cray Grant, Bt
Preceded by William Gill Paxton; John Henry North	Member of Parliament for Plympton Erle; 1826–1832; With: George Edgcumbe to December 1826; Sir Charles Wetherell 1826–1830; Viscount Valletort August–December 1830; Sir Compton Domvile, Bt from December 1830	Borough disenfranchised
