= Sir Compton Domvile, 1st Baronet =

Irish Member of Parliament

Sir Compton Domvile, 1st Baronet (c. 1775 – 23 February 1857) of Templeogue and Santry House, County Dublin, was an Irish Member of Parliament in the United Kingdom parliament and Governor of County Dublin.

== Life ==
He was born in County Dublin, the eldest son of Charles Domvile (1739-1810) (and his wife Margaret Sheppard), originally Charles Pocklington, who had adopted the name Domvile after inheriting both the Domvile and Santry estates from his cousin the 4th Baron Barry of Santry and was an MP in the Irish Parliament. Charles was the son of Admiral Christopher Pocklington and the grandson of John Pocklington, an English-born lawyer who settled in Ireland and became a Baron of the Court of Exchequer (Ireland). His son Christopher married the Domvile heiress.

Compton joined the British Army, rising to the rank of captain in the 68th Regiment of Foot in 1808 but left the army in 1810 when he succeeded his father to his estates. He changed his own surname from Pocklington to Domvile in 1814 and was created a Baronet (of Templeogue and Santry House) in the Baronetage of the United Kingdom on 27 December 1814.

He was keen to see the Barony of Santry revived in his favour and wrote to Peel asking for the privilege. Peel declined the request but arranged for him to have a seat in Parliament in 1818 for the rotten borough of Bossiney. He held the seat until 1826, supporting the government in the House. He subsequently represented Okehampton from 1826 to 1830 and Plympton Erle from 1830 to 1832. He was appointed Governor of County Dublin from 1822 to 1831 and Custos Rotulorum of County Dublin from 1823 until his death in 1857.

== Family ==
He married twice; firstly in 1811, Elizabeth Frances, the daughter of Rt. Rev. Charles Lindsay, Bishop of Kildare with whom he had a son and secondly in 1815, Helena Sarah, daughter of Frederick Trench of Queen's County, with whom he had a further three sons and three daughters.

Parliament of the United Kingdom
Preceded by Hon. James Stuart-Wortley; William Yates Peel	Member of Parliament for Bossiney; 1818–1826; With: Hon. James Stuart-Wortley 1818–1819; Hon John Ward 1819–1823; John Stuart-Wortley-Mackenzie 1823–1826	Succeeded by James Stuart-Wortley-Mackenzie; Edward Rose Tunno
Preceded by William Henry Trant; Lord Glenorchy	Member of Parliament for Okehampton; 1826–1830; With: Joseph Holden Strutt	Succeeded by Lord Seymour; George Agar-Ellis
Preceded by Viscount Valletort; Gibbs Crawfurd Antrobus	Member of Parliament for Plympton Erle; 1830–1832; With: Gibbs Crawfurd Antrobus	Constituency abolished
Baronetage of the United Kingdom
New creation	Baronet (of Templeogue and Santry House); 1815–1857	Succeeded by Charles Domvile
