= 1826 United Kingdom general election =

- 7 June – 12 July 1826

All 658 seats in the House of Commons 330 seats needed for a majority
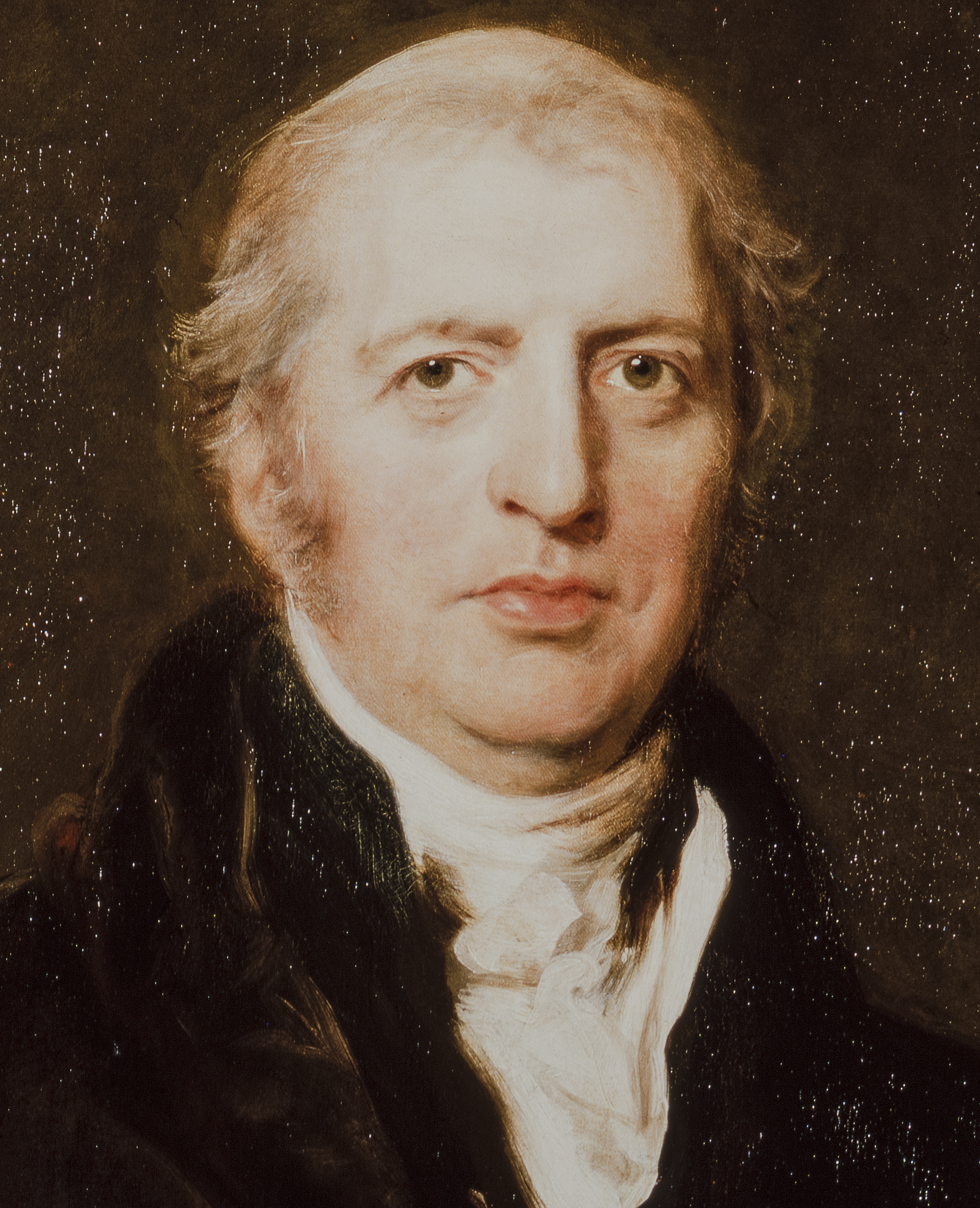

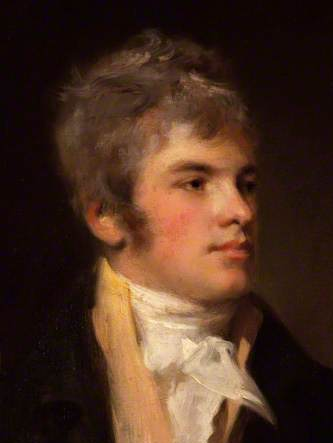
| | First party | Second party |
|---|---|---|
| Leader | Earl of Liverpool | Marquess of Lansdowne |
| Party | Tory | Whig |
| Leader since | 8 June 1812 | 1824 |
| Seats before | 341 | 215 |
| Seats won | 428 | 198 |
| Seat change | ▲87 | ▼17 |
- Composition of the House of Commons after the election
Prime Minister before election
Earl of Liverpool
Tory
Prime Minister after
election
Earl of Liverpool
Tory

The 1826 United Kingdom general election was the 7th general election after the Acts of Union 1800, held on 7 June 1826 to 12 July 1826, to elect members of the House of Commons, the lower house of Parliament. It saw the Tories under Robert Jenkinson, 2nd Earl of Liverpool win a landslide victory over the Whigs. In Ireland, liberal Protestant candidates favouring Catholic emancipation, backed by the Catholic Association, achieved significant gains.

The seventh United Kingdom Parliament was dissolved on 2 June 1826. The new Parliament was summoned to meet on 25 July 1826, for a maximum seven-year term from that date. The maximum term could be and normally was curtailed, by the monarch dissolving the Parliament, before its term expired. As of 2024, the Earl of Liverpool remains the most recent prime minister to have won four successive elections.

== Political situation ==
The Tory leader was the Earl of Liverpool, who had been prime minister since his predecessor's assassination in 1812. Liverpool had led his party to three general election victories before that of 1826. The Tory Leader of the House of Commons until 1822, when he committed suicide, was Robert Stewart. He was known by the courtesy title of Viscount Castlereagh, until he inherited his father's Irish peerage and became the 2nd Marquess of Londonderry in 1821. Londonderry was replaced as leader by George Canning, who remained Leader of the House of Commons in 1826.

The Whig Party continued to suffer from weak leadership, particularly in the House of Commons.

In 1824 Charles Grey, 2nd Earl Grey gave up the formal Whig leadership in the Lords, although he remained the most prominent Whig peer. Grey asked his friends to look to the leadership of Henry Petty-Fitzmaurice, 3rd Marquess of Lansdowne. Although Lansdowne performed the functions of leader, he did not accept the title.

At the time of the general election, Grey was still the leading figure amongst the Whig peers. It was likely that he would have been invited to form a government, had the Whigs come to power, although in this era the monarch rather than the governing party decided which individual would be prime minister.

The Leader of the Opposition in the House of Commons at the previous general election, George Tierney, disclaimed the leadership on 23 January 1821. No new Whig leader emerged during the rest of the Parliament.

There had been significant developments in Irish politics since the 1820 general election. Whilst Catholics in Ireland—who met the normal property qualifications—had been permitted to vote since before the Union, they were still not eligible to sit in the United Kingdom Parliament. The right for Catholics to serve in Parliament was known as a measure of Catholic emancipation. In 1823, Daniel O'Connell started a campaign for repeal of the Act of Union, and took Catholic Emancipation as his rallying call, establishing the Catholic Association.

From 1826, the Catholic Association began to support pro-emancipation candidates in elections. The Association used its money and manpower to campaign for candidates to be elected into Parliament, to pressure the government from within to pass Catholic emancipation.

== Dates of election ==
At this period there was not one election day. After receiving a writ (a royal command) for the election to be held, the local returning officer fixed the election timetable for the particular constituency or constituencies he was concerned with. Polling in seats with contested elections could continue for many days.

The general election took place between the first contest on 7 June and the last contest on 12 July 1826.

== Summary of the constituencies ==
In 1821 the borough of Grampound in Cornwall was disenfranchised for corruption. Its two seats were transferred to the county of Yorkshire, which from this general election became a four-seat constituency.

Monmouthshire (1 County constituency with 2 MPs and one single member Borough constituency) is included in Wales in these tables. Sources for this period may include the county in England.

Table 1: Constituencies and MPs, by type and country

| Country | BC | CC | UC | Total C | BMP | CMP | UMP | Total MPs |
|---|---|---|---|---|---|---|---|---|
| England | 201 | 39 | 2 | 242 | 402 | 80 | 4 | 486 |
| Wales | 13 | 13 | 0 | 26 | 13 | 14 | 0 | 27 |
| Scotland | 15 | 30 | 0 | 45 | 15 | 30 | 0 | 45 |
| Ireland | 33 | 32 | 1 | 66 | 35 | 64 | 1 | 100 |
| Total | 262 | 114 | 3 | 379 | 465 | 178 | 5 | 658 |

Table 2: Number of seats per constituency, by type and country

| Country | BCx1 | BCx2 | BCx4 | CCx1 | CCx2 | CCx4 | UCx1 | UCx2 | Total C |
|---|---|---|---|---|---|---|---|---|---|
| England | 4 | 195 | 2 | 0 | 38 | 1 | 0 | 2 | 242 |
| Wales | 13 | 0 | 0 | 12 | 1 | 0 | 0 | 0 | 26 |
| Scotland | 15 | 0 | 0 | 30 | 0 | 0 | 0 | 0 | 45 |
| Ireland | 31 | 2 | 0 | 0 | 32 | 0 | 1 | 0 | 66 |
| Total | 63 | 197 | 2 | 42 | 71 | 1 | 1 | 2 | 379 |

== See also ==
- United Kingdom general elections
- List of MPs elected in the 1826 United Kingdom general election
