= John Cressett-Pelham =

British politician

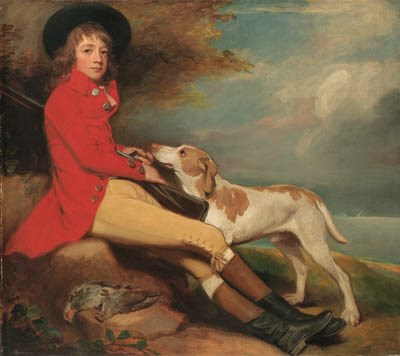
Master Pelham, painting by George Romney, c. 1786.

John Cressett-Pelham (1769 – 29 August 1838) was a British politician.

Pelham was the son of Henry Cressett Pelham. He lived at Cound Hall and Shrewsbury Castle. At the 1820 UK general election, he was elected for the Whigs in Shropshire. At the 1832 UK general election, he instead contested Shrewsbury, and was defeated, but he won the seat at the 1835 UK general election, before losing it again in 1837.

He died at sea in 1838 near Mauritius.
