= Calcraft =

Calcraft is a surname. Notable people with the surname include:

- Bill Calcraft (born 1960), former Australian rugby union player
- Granby Hales Calcraft (1802–1855), British Member of Parliament and army captain, son of John Calcraft the younger
- Granby Thomas Calcraft (1770–1820), British major-general and Member of Parliament, son of John Calcraft
- Joe Calcraft (1929–1976), Australian dairy farmer and politician
- John Calcraft (1726–1772), English army agent and politician
- John Calcraft (the younger) (1765–1831), English Member of Parliament, illegitimate elder son and heir of John Calcraft
- John Hales Calcraft (1796–1880), British Member of Parliament, son of John Calcraft the younger
- John Calcraft (1831–1868), British Member of Parliament, grandson of John Calcraft
- Thomas Calcraft (1738–1783), English Member of Parliament, brother of John Calcraft
- William Calcraft (1800–1879), English hangman
