= John Calcraft (disambiguation) =

John Calcraft is the name of several individuals in the same family:

- John Calcraft (1726–1772), English army agent and politician
- John Calcraft (the younger) (1765–1831), English Member of Parliament, illegitimate elder son and heir of John Calcraft
- John Hales Calcraft (1796–1880), British Member of Parliament, son of John Calcraft the younger
- John Calcraft (1831–1868), British Member of Parliament, grandson of John Calcraft
