= Granby Calcraft =

Granby Calcraft may refer to:

- Granby Hales Calcraft (1802–1855), British MP for Wareham and captain in the army
- Granby Thomas Calcraft (1770–1820), British soldier and politician
