= Thomas Barbour (disambiguation) =

Thomas Barbour (1884–1946) was an American herpetologist.

Thomas Barbour may also refer to:

- Thomas Barbour (MP for Wareham), represented Wareham, 1395
- Thomas Barbour (MP for Hythe) (fl.1421), English MP
- Thomas Barbour (Virginia politician) (1735–1825), American landowner and member of the Virginia House of Burgesses
- Tommy Barbour (1887–1967), Scottish footballer
- Thomas Barbour (actor), American actor appearing in Arthur (1981)
