= Joseph Romilly =

British writer (1791–1864)

Joseph Romilly (1791–1864) was an English academic administrator, known as a diarist.

== Life ==
He was son of Thomas Peter Romilly of London, by his cousin Jane Anne, second daughter of Isaac Romilly, who was uncle of Sir Samuel Romilly. He entered Trinity College, Cambridge, in 1809, became a scholar of the college, and graduated B.A. in 1813 as fourth wrangler. He was elected Fellow in 1815, and proceeded M.A. in 1816. He took holy orders, but he never held any preferment, except that he was rector of the family living of Porthkerry, Glamorgan, from 1830 to 1837, and chaplain to Thomas Musgrave, Archbishop of York, who had been a friend at Trinity.

He belonged to the liberal party in the university, led by George Peacock and Adam Sedgwick, Romilly's intimate friend. In 1821, he joined the committee for promoting a subscription in the university to aid the Greeks in their war of independence. He was one of the party who successfully opposed the petition, which it was planned should be presented in 1829 against Catholic emancipation. He opposed Christopher Wordsworth, then master of Trinity, on the question of Connop Thirlwall's dismissal in 1834.

On 23 March 1832 Romilly was elected registrary of the University of Cambridge after a competition with Temple Chevallier, and remained in this office until 1861, when he retired. His major work as registrary was the arrangement and cataloguing of all the university papers. He died suddenly at Yarmouth, of heart disease, on Sunday 7 August 1864, and was buried in a vault in Christ Church, Barnwell.

== Diary ==
From 1832 till his death Romilly kept a diary, which was used by the authors of the Life of Adam Sedgwick; it contains nearly as much about Sedgwick as about its author. An edited version has been published as Romilly's Cambridge Diary, 1832–42: Selected Passages from the Diary of the Rev. Joseph Romilly, Fellow of Trinity College and Registrary of the University of Cambridge (2009), edited by John Patrick Tuer Bury.

He also edited Graduati Cantabrigienses, 1760–1846, which was published at Cambridge in 1846.
