= 1868 Wareham by-election =

UK parliamentary by-election

- 23 December 1868
Candidate	John Erle-Drax	W. M. Calcraft
Party	Conservative	Liberal
Popular vote	374	305
MP before election
John Calcraft
Liberal
Subsequent MP
John Erle-Drax
Conservative

The 1868 Wareham by-election was fought on 23 December 1868. The by-election was fought due to the death of the incumbent MP of the Liberal Party, John Calcraft. It was won by the Conservative candidate John Erle-Drax.

== Result ==
By-election, 23 December 1868: Wareham
Party	Candidate	Votes	%	±%
Conservative	John Erle-Drax	374	55.1	+1.0
Liberal	W. M. Calcraft	305	44.9	−1.0
Majority		69	10.2	N/A
Turnout		679	76.0	−0.4
Registered electors		894		
Conservative gain from Liberal		Swing	+1.1	
