= Samuel Romilly =

British politician and lawyer (1757-1818)

Sir Samuel Romilly KC
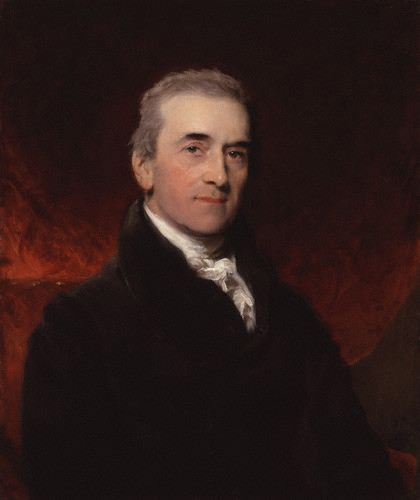
- Portrait by Thomas Lawrence, c. 1806–1810

Solicitor General for England and Wales
- In office 1806–1807
- Preceded by: Sir Vicary Gibbs
- Succeeded by: Sir Thomas Plumer

Member of Parliament for Horsham
- In office 1807–1808 Serving with Sir Love Jones-Parry
- Preceded by: Francis John Wilder
- Succeeded by: Joseph Marryat

Member of Parliament for Wareham
- In office 1808–1812 Serving with John Ward
- Preceded by: Sir Granby Calcraft
- Succeeded by: Robert Gordon

Member of Parliament for Arundel
- In office 1812–1818 Serving with Francis Wilder
- Preceded by: Henry Howard-Molyneux-Howard
- Succeeded by: Henry Howard-Molyneux-Howard

Member of Parliament for Westminster
- In office July 1818 – November 1818 Serving with Sir Francis Burdett
- Preceded by: Thomas Cochrane
- Succeeded by: George Lamb

Personal details
- Born: 1 March 1757 Soho, London, England
- Died: 2 November 1818 (aged 61) Bloomsbury, London
- Party: Whig
- Spouse: Anne Garbett (m. 1798)
- Children: 7, including John, Edward, Charles and Frederick
- Relatives: Peter Mark Roget (nephew); Esmond Romilly (great-great-grandson); Giles Romilly (great-great-grandson)
- Occupation: Lawyer, politician
- Known for: Legal reform

Sir Samuel Romilly KC (1 March 1757 – 2 November 1818) was a British lawyer, Whig politician, abolitionist and legal reformer. Born in London of French Huguenot descent, he was largely self-educated and escaped poverty through a fortuitous inheritance that allowed travel. From a background in the commercial world, Romilly became well-connected, and rose to public office as Solicitor General for England and Wales (1806–1807) and a prominent position in Parliament, where he sat for Horsham (1807–1808), Wareham (1808–1812), Arundel (1812–1818), and finally Westminster (July 1818 until his death).

After an early interest in radical politics, he built a career in chancery cases and then turned to reform of British criminal law and abolition of the slave trade. The grandson of refugees, he became known as a "friend of the oppressed". However, few of his ambitions were achieved during his lifetime, which was cut short in 1818, when, despondent after the death of his wife, he died by suicide. He was said to have left criminal law "in the same state as he had found it when he embarked upon his work of amelioration", but he did manage to repeal a number of laws deemed excessively cruel. He was also an early campaigner against the death penalty, which was partially realised on the bicentennial of his birth with the Homicide Act 1957.

His eldest son, John, was Attorney General for England and Wales and was ennobled as Baron Romilly in 1866. Three other sons, Frederick Romilly, Edward Romilly, and Charles Romilly, were first-class cricketers.

== Early life ==
=== Family origin ===
Romilly was born on Frith Street in Soho, London, into a French-speaking Huguenot family who had fled France after the Revocation of the Edict of Nantes. He was the second surviving son of Pierre (Peter) Romilly, a watchmaker and jeweller, and his wife, Marguerite (Margaret) Garnault, daughter of Aymé Garnault, another Huguenot jeweller, whose father left Châtellerault in Poitou. Isaac Romilly was his father's elder brother.

His paternal grandfather, Étienne (Stephen) Romilly, emigrated from Montpellier to Hoxton in 1701 via Geneva. He married Judith de Montsallier. Étienne's father, who owned a large estate in Montpellier, helped him financially, and he set up a firm in Hoxton as a wax bleacher and was able to comfortably support his large family and business interests. However, when his father died in France, a Catholic relative inherited the estate and slashed his income to a paltry amount, and ultimately he was left bankrupt, unable to cover his expenses. Remembered for his generosity and his piety, Étienne died in 1733, aged 49, "of a broken heart" according to Samuel's memoirs. He left a widow and eight children, the youngest of whom died within a few months and was buried in his father's grave. Samuel's father, Pierre, was the youngest surviving child.

=== Education and upbringing ===
Pierre and Marguerite Romilly married in 1744. They had six children who died young: Michel Pierre (April 1744 – December 1744), Marguerite (born 1745), Sarah (1746–1747), Anne (born 1747–1748), Mary (1749–1755), and Judith (born 1752), followed finally by three surviving children, Thomas Peter (17 June 1753 – 7 December 1828), Catherine (born 14 February 1755) and lastly Samuel. Pierre blamed the deaths of his children on the unhealthy atmosphere of the city of London. They moved to Soho and then moved again to the High Street in Marylebone – at the time a small village a mile from the city.

His mother was in poor health, and Samuel and his siblings were largely raised by a maternal relative, Margaret Facquier, who educated the children mainly with the Bible, the 18th-century moralist periodical The Spectator, and an English translation of François Fénelon's Les Aventures de Télémaque. For a while he attended a school run by a Mr. Flack, which he hated, and his formal education ended at age 14.

Every Sunday, his family attended the French Protestant Chapel in Soho, where his future brother-in-law, John (Jean) Roget from Geneva, was pastor. (Roget and Samuel's sister Catherine were the parents of Peter Mark Roget). Roget introduced Romilly to the works of Jean Jacques Rousseau, and he became a follower. Self-taught from then on, Romilly became a good classical scholar and was conversant with French literature.

Romilly's first cousin once removed Sir Samuel Fludyer, 1st Baronet, M.P., was his godfather and namesake, and he had prospects for entering Fludyer's successful wool business. He had a clerkship learning bookkeeping, but Sir Samuel died in 1768, followed by his brother and partner, Sir Thomas Fludyer, in 1769, and the opportunity fell away.

However, good fortune entered his life in a generous benefactor, his great-uncle Philip Delahaize (or de la Haize; brother of his grandmother Marguerite Alavoine Garnault). Delahaize also died in 1769, when Samuel was 12 years old. Delahaize "was a gentleman of great wealth and benevolence, and by his judicious bequests to his circle of relations he set a number of refugee families upon their feet in a nation in which their ancestors had retired to voluntary poverty." He left £2,000 (equivalent to £315,000 in 2025) each to Samuel and his brother, and £3,000 each (equivalent to £473,000 in 2025) to his parents and sister.

Romilly was articled in 1773 to William Michael Lally, a solicitor who worked in the Six Clerks office of the Court of Chancery. However, after five years, when it became possible for Romilly to purchase a post there, he turned down the opportunity.

== Legal career ==
In 1778, Romilly decided on a career as barrister, and entered Gray's Inn. He was a pupil of Jeffries Spranger, an equity draughtsman. Called to the bar in 1783, he went the Midland circuit, but was mostly occupied with chancery practice. His practice at the chancery bar grew, and in 1800, he was made a King's Counsel. In 1805, he was appointed chancellor of the county palatine of Durham.

== Travels and associations, radical period ==
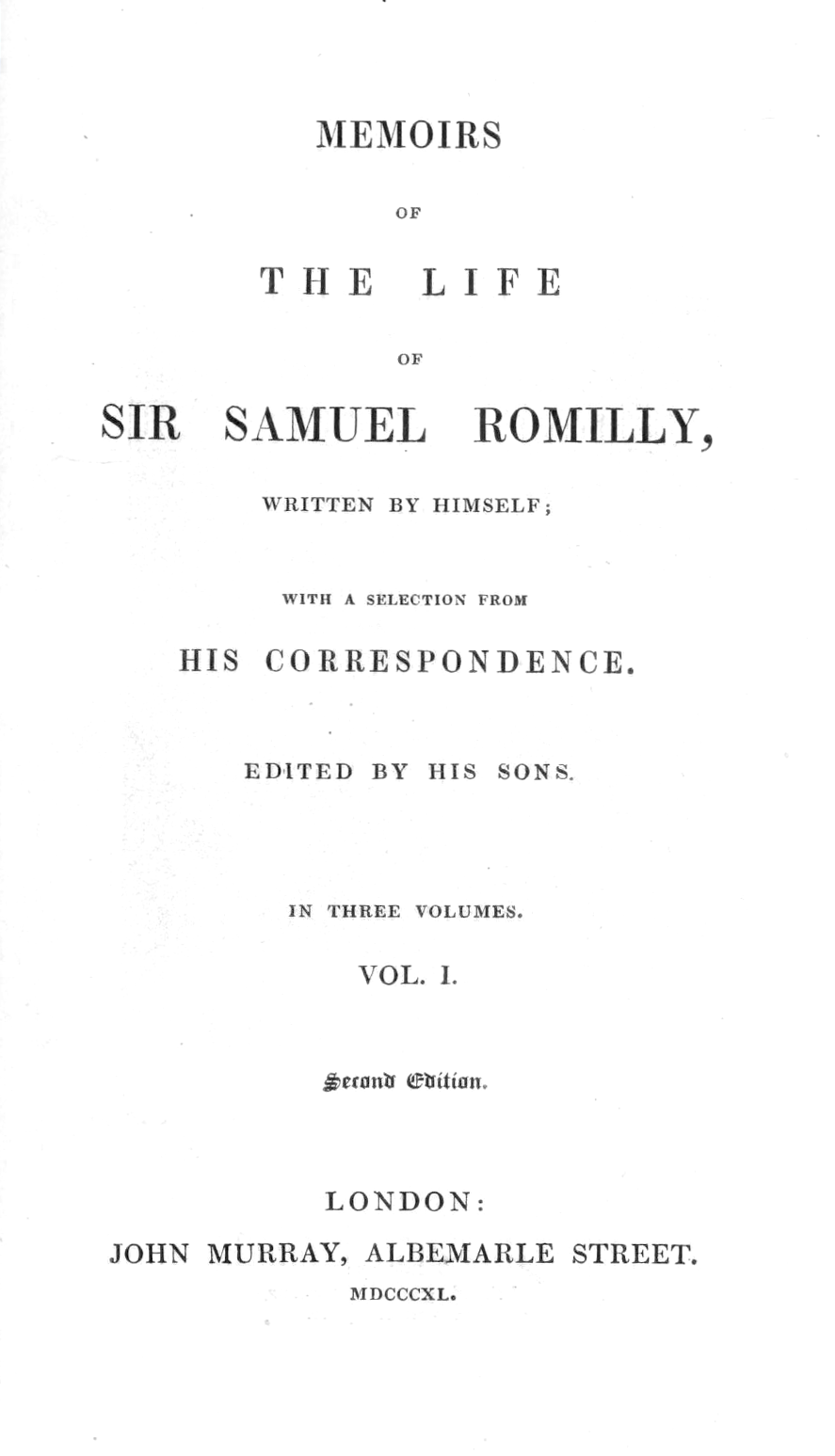
Memoirs of Sir Samuel Romilly, 1840

=== First continental tour ===
In the legal vacation of 1781, Romilly made a tour in France and Switzerland. He had the family connection with Geneva through John Roget, now his brother-in-law. Roget, who died in 1783, moved back there for his health, and Romilly brought out the young Peter Mark Roget to be reunited with his parents. In Geneva, Romilly also met Pierre Étienne Louis Dumont. Staying for a period with David Chauvet, one of the progressive group of local politicians, Romilly met the like-minded Etienne Clavière.

A friend from the Paris leg of this visit was Marguerite Madeleine Delessert, later Madame Gautier. Her mother was Madeleine Catherine Boy de La Tour, who married Etienne Delessert. Marguerite became the wife of the Genevan banker Jean-Antoine Gautier, who moved to Paris. Romilly stayed at the Delessert home in Passy.

=== Second continental tour ===
In 1783, immediately after being called to the bar, Romilly made a second tour. This time he was accompanied in France by John Baynes, and met Benjamin Franklin at Passy, to whom Baynes had an introduction from John Jebb. In Lausanne, he met the Abbé Raynal.

In the meantime, the failed Geneva Revolution of 1782 had occurred. Romilly was introduced in 1784 to Honoré Mirabeau by the Genevan writer François d'Ivernois, as his Memoirs state; Halevy stated it was through Thomas Brand Hollis. D'Ivernois and Dumont formed part of the group of the revolution's leaders who by then were exiles in London. Mirabeau saw him daily for a long time.

=== Bowood circle ===
William Petty, 2nd Earl of Shelburne (later the Marquess of Lansdown), Prime Minister in 1782–1783, invited Romilly to Bowood House, around 1784–1785. He had heard Romilly's name from Mirabeau, had read the pamphlet A Fragment on the Constitutional Power and Duty of Juries upon Trials for Libels by Romilly, and was interested in Dumont..

In what has been called the Bowood circle, Jeremy Bentham, with whom Romilly was acquainted, became a friend, and he had much to do with Benjamin Vaughan, another friend. Romilly and Bentham enjoyed a loose and complex intellectual alliance for several decades from this point.

=== French Revolution and its era ===
In 1789, Romilly visited Paris and studied the course of the French Revolution there, also visiting the dungeon at Vincennes where Mirabeau had been confined. When Mirabeau became a political leader, it was to Romilly that he applied for an account of the procedure used in the House of Commons of Great Britain. He left France with less optimism about the politics of the Revolution.

Romilly's abilities were recognized by the Whig party. The Marquess of Lansdowne offered him in 1792 the parliamentary seat of Calne, which Romilly turned down. In July 1793 he defended Birmingham booksellers who had sold Tom Paine's works, despite thinking Paine was lacking in arguments; and in August of that year attended the sedition trial of Thomas Muir, which he regarded as shocking.

By the end of 1793, Romilly had concluded that French revolutionary politics amounted to "barbarism". He explained in 1794 to his correspondent Madame Gautier that "public events" had brought about his change of views. In August 1797 he secured the acquittal of the radical John Binns for treason.

During the 1802 Peace of Amiens, Romilly was in Paris. He visited the Palais Bourbon, where the Legislative Assembly met, with Bentham.

== Political career ==
In 1806, on the accession of the Ministry of All the Talents to office, Romilly was offered the post of Solicitor General, although he had never sat in the House of Commons. He accepted, was knighted, and was brought into parliament for Queenborough. He went out of office with the government, but remained in the House of Commons, sitting successively for Horsham, Wareham and Arundel. Romilly's reforming efforts made his reputation. In 1818, he was returned at the head of the poll for the city of Westminster. He had not much longer to live.

=== Abolitionist ===
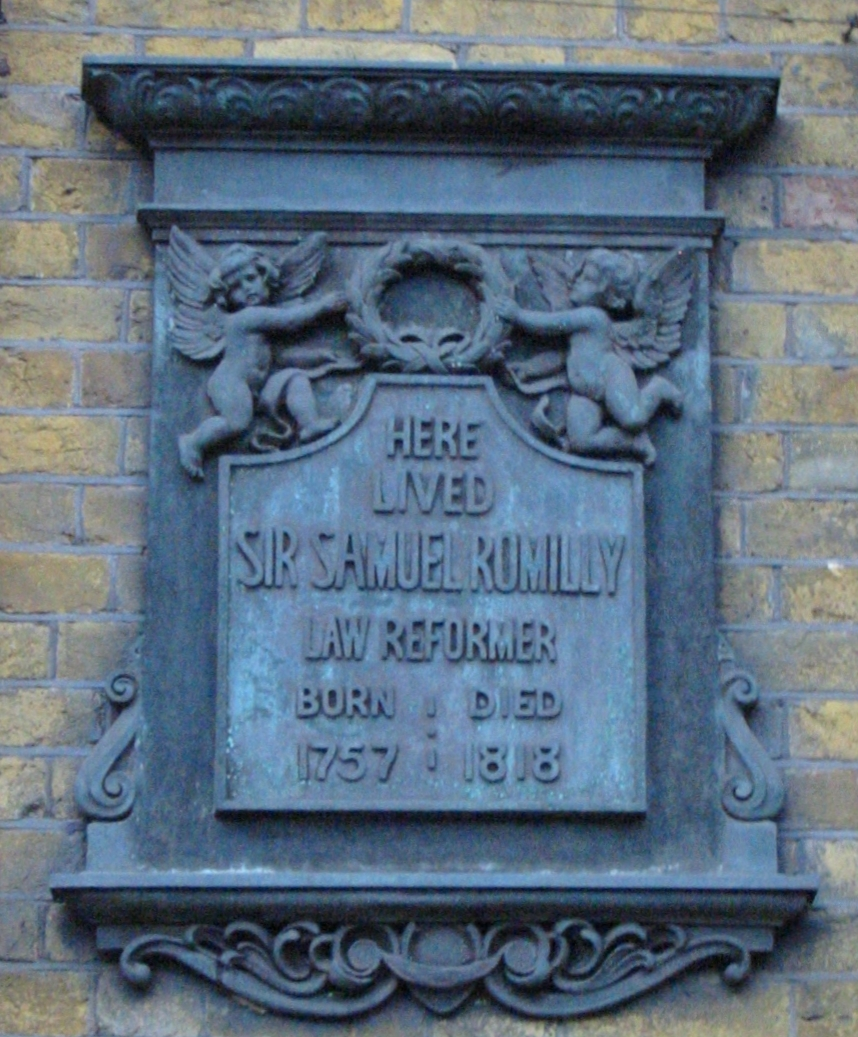
Plaque to Sir Samuel Romilly at his home in Russell Square Bloomsbury, London

Romilly was a vocal opponent of the slave trade. His interest came early in life, by the time of his meeting in 1783 with the Abbé Raynal, whose Histoire des deux Indes he had read. He gave his support to William Wilberforce's abolition campaign.

During the parliamentary debate on the Slave Trade Bill, Romilly paid tribute to Wilberforce, stating that his leadership had "preserved so many millions of his fellow creatures." As he concluded his remarks, Romilly was greeted with a standing ovation by other Members of Parliament, a reaction that very rarely occurred in the House of Commons. Wilberforce himself sat with his head in his hands, tears streaming down his face.

=== Legal reformer ===
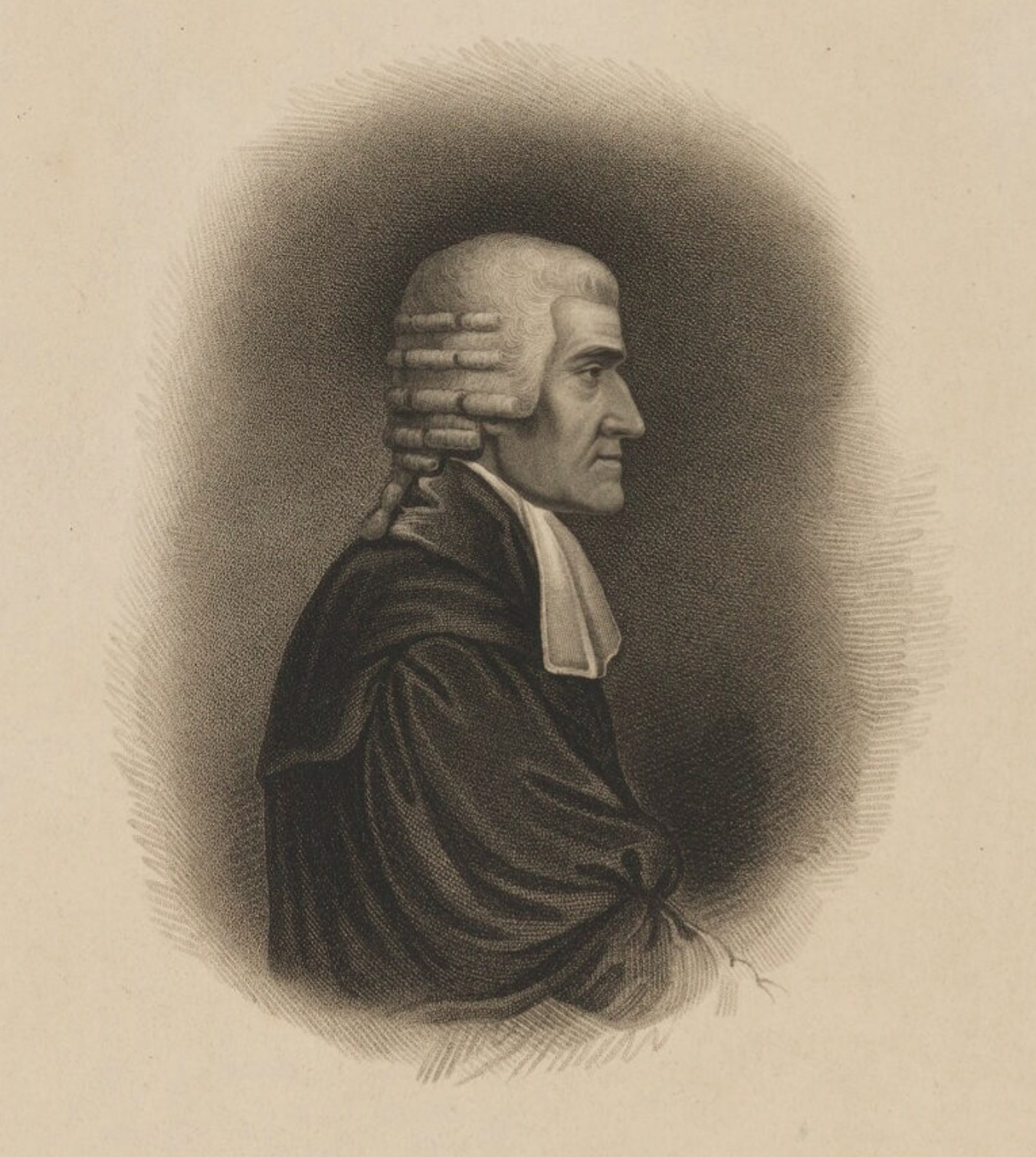
Sir Samuel Romilly, engraving by John Kennerly after C. Bestland, 1822

Romilly worked to reform the criminal law, under the influence of what is now called Classical criminology. He spent a dozen years of his life on the passage through Parliament of legislative reforms. He argued against the attitudes to punishments of Martin Madan and William Paley. The so-called Bloody Code of justice was, in his view, something that required reform, while, as he stated in his Memoirs, one effect of the French Revolution was to lessen the chances of Parliament passing the necessary legislation. The tide of opinion, however, was beginning to turn.

In 1808, Romilly managed to repeal the Elizabethan statute which made it a capital offence to steal from the person. Successful prosecutions of pickpockets then rose. Charles Williams-Wynn, on the other hand, saw Romilly's background in equity law and discrete bills, as inadequate.

In 1809, three bills for repealing draconian statutes were thrown out by the House of Lords under the influence of Lord Ellenborough. Romilly saw further bills rejected; but in March 1812 he had repealed a statute of Elizabeth I making it a capital offence for a soldier or a mariner to beg without a pass from a magistrate or his commanding officer.

In 1813, John William Ward found the approach too "philosophical". Romilly failed to pass a law which would have abolished corruption of blood for all crimes, but in the following year he tried again and succeeded, with the exception of treason and murder. Also in 1814, he succeeded in abolishing hanging, drawing and quartering.

Seeing a connection, Romilly advocated prison reform in 1811. However, reform in the direction proposed by Jeremy Bentham was thwarted.

== Works ==
- A Fragment on the Constitutional Power and Duty of Juries upon Trials for Libels (1784) on juries and the Case of the Dean of St Asaph, anonymous publication by the Society for Constitutional Information.
- Observations on a Late Publication Intituled, Thoughts on Executive Justice (1786), influenced by Cesare Beccaria, was a reply to Martin Madan's Thoughts on Executive Justice, advocating the increase of capital punishments.
- Thoughts on the Probable Influence of the Late Revolution in France upon Great Britain (1790).
- Letters containing an Account of the late Revolution in France, and Observations on the Laws, Manners, and Institutions of the English; written during the author's residence at Paris and Versailles in the years 1789 and 1790; translated from the German of Henry Frederic Groenvelt (1792), translation from the French of letters of Etienne Dumont, with some of Romilly's own letters (assistance from James Scarlett), containing criticism of British politics from a republican angle.

== Death ==
On 29 October 1818, Lady Romilly died in the Isle of Wight. A few days later, on 2 November 1818, Romilly cut his throat and died in a few minutes in his house on Russell Square in London. His nephew Peter Mark Roget attended him in his final moments. His last words were written: "My dear, I wish", presumably regarding his late wife.

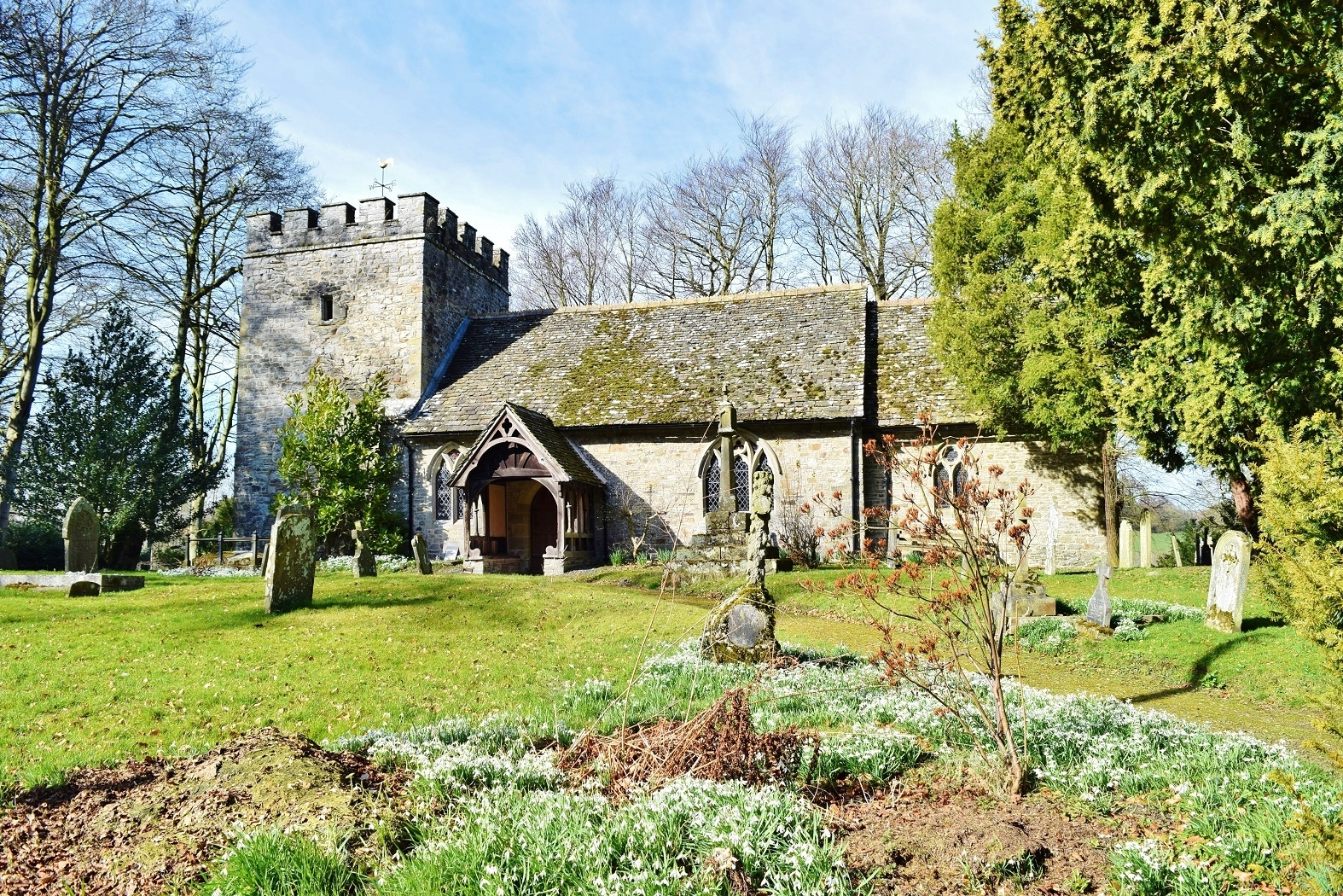
Parish church of St Michael and All Angels, Knill, Herefordshire, where Ann and Samuel Romilly were buried

Romilly was buried on 11 November 1818 at the parish church of St Michael and All Angels, Knill, Herefordshire, with his wife Ann.

== Family ==
Romilly married Anne Garbett, daughter of Francis Garbett, of Knill Court, Herefordshire in 1798. They had met at Bowood House, and Francis Garbett had worked for Lord Shelburne as his secretary. They had six sons and a daughter:

- Sophia Romilly (d. 9 October 1879). She married the Rt. Hon. Thomas Francis Kennedy, Member of Parliament for Ayr Burghs and grandson of John Adam.
- William Romilly (1798 – 3 October 1855)
- John Romilly, 1st Baron Romilly (10 January 1802 – 23 December 1874)
- Edward Romilly (1804 – 12 October 1870), MP for Ludlow and a first-class cricketer. He married Sophia Marcet, daughter of Swiss chemist Alexander John Gaspard Marcet. They had no known children.
- Henry Romilly (31 Dec 1804 – 25 December 1884). He married Rosa Morris, and had no known issue.
- Charles Romilly (1808 – 29 August 1887), first-class cricketer. He married Lady Georgiana Elizabeth Russell, daughter of John Russell, 6th Duke of Bedford and Georgiana Gordon. They had six sons.
- Lt.-Col. Frederick Romilly (21 March 1810 – 6 April 1887), politician and cricketer, married Lady Elizabeth Amelia Jane, daughter of Gilbert Elliot-Murray-Kynynmound, 2nd Earl of Minto

Sir Samuel Romilly's Infant Sons' Estate Act 1823
- Act of Parliament
- Parliament of the United Kingdom
- Long title: An Act for authorizing the Investment of Monies belonging to the Infant Sons of Sir Samuel Romilly deceased, in the Purchase of certain Parts of his Daughter's Share of his Real Estate, to be conveyed to Trustees upon certain Trusts.
- Citation: 4 Geo. 4. c. 22 Pr.

Dates
- Royal assent: 27 June 1823

Romilly bought an estate from Francis Mathew, 2nd Earl Landaff which was to be divided among his children. After his wife's death Henry, 3rd Marquess of Lansdowne and John Whishaw were guardians to his minor children. A private act of Parliament, Sir Samuel Romilly's Infant Sons' Estate Act 1823 (4 Geo. 4. c. 22 Pr.) permitted Lansdowne and Whishaw to purchase the shares in the Landaff estate of Sophia and the minor sons.

== Sources ==
- Collins, William Job (1908). "The Life and Work of Sir Samuel Romilly". Proceedings of the Huguenot Society of London. 8 (4): 310–339.
- Graham, Jenny (2000). The Nation, the Law, and the King: Reform Politics in England, 1789–1799. University Press of America. ISBN 0-7618-1484-1.
- Medd, Patrick (1968). Romilly: a life of Sir Samuel Romilly, lawyer and reformer. London: Collins.
- Romilly, Sir Samuel (1841). Memoirs of the Life of Sir Samuel Romilly, written by himself; with a Selection from his Correspondence, edited by his Sons (3rd ed.). London: John Murray. Vol. I; Vol. II

Parliament of the United Kingdom
Preceded by Francis John Wilder; Love Jones-Parry	Member of Parliament for Horsham; 1807–1808; With: Love Jones-Parry	Succeeded by Joseph Marryat; Henry Goulburn
Preceded by Sir Granby Calcraft; Hon. John Ward	Member of Parliament for Wareham; 1808–1812; With: Hon. John Ward	Succeeded by Robert Gordon; Theodore Henry Broadhead
Preceded by Francis Wilder; Henry Thomas Molyneux-Howard	Member of Parliament for Arundel; 1812–1818; With: Francis Wilder	Succeeded by Sir Arthur Piggott; Lord Henry Howard-Molyneux-Howard
Preceded by Lord Cochrane; Sir Francis Burdett, Bt	Member of Parliament for Westminster; Jul 1818 – Nov 1818; With: Sir Francis Burdett, Bt	Succeeded by George Lamb; Sir Francis Burdett, Bt
Legal offices
Preceded by Sir Vicary Gibbs	Solicitor General for England and Wales; 1806–1807	Succeeded by Sir Thomas Plumer
