= Brinckman baronets =

Baronetcy in the Baronetage of the United Kingdom

The Broadhead, later Brinckman Baronetcy, of Burton or Monk Bretton in the County of York, is a title in the Baronetage of the United Kingdom. It was created on 30 September 1831 for Theodore Broadhead, Member of Parliament for Yarmouth. In 1842 he resumed by Royal Licence the old family surname of Brinckman in lieu of his patronymic. Brinckman was the son of Theodore Broadhead, who also represented Yarmouth in the House of Commons, son of Theodore Broadhead, High Sheriff of Surrey in 1786, who assumed the surname of Broadhead in lieu of Brinckman by Act of Parliament. The latter's grandfather Theodore, Baron Brinckman, had emigrated to Britain from Hanover. The first Baronet was succeeded by his eldest son, the second Baronet. He sat as Liberal Member of Parliament for Canterbury. His grandson, the fourth Baronet died childless in 1954 and was succeeded by his younger brother, the fifth Baronet. The latter was a colonel in the Grenadier Guards, Aide-de-Camp to the Governor of Victoria and to the Governor General of Canada and Chief of Staff to the British Military Mission in Moscow during the Second World War.

== Brinckman baronets, of Burton or Monk Bretton (1831) ==
- Sir Theodore Henry Lavington Brinckman, 1st Baronet (1798–1880)
- Sir Theodore Henry Brinckman, 2nd Baronet (1830–1905)
- Sir Theodore Francis Brinckman, CB, 3rd Baronet (1862–1937)
- Sir Theodore Ernest Warren Brinckman, 4th Baronet (1898–1954)
- Sir Roderick Napoleon Brinckman, DSO, MC, 5th Baronet (1902–1985)
- Sir (Theodore George) Roderick Brinckman, 6th Baronet (1932–2020)
- Sir Theodore Jonathan Brinckman, 7th baronet (1960–2022)
- Sir Roderick Nicholas Brinckman, 8th baronet (born 1964). The Official Roll considers as of 2026 that the title is vacant.

== Arms ==
Coat of arms of Brinckman baronets

Crest
A Pair of Wings each quarterly Argent and Azure.
Escutcheon
Quarterly: 1st & 4th, Argent, three Hills Azure (Brinckman); 2nd & 3rd, Ermine, two Eagles displayed in chief Gules, and a Lion rampant in base proper, collared and chained Or (Broadhead).
Motto
PERSEVERANDO (By persevering)

Baronetage of the United Kingdom
Preceded by Birch baronets	Brinckman baronets of Burton or Monk Bretton; 30 September 1831	Succeeded by Campbell baronets
