= Cheverell =

Cheverell may refer to:

- Great Cheverell, Wiltshire, England, United Kingdom
- Little Cheverell, Wiltshire, England, United Kingdom
- John Cheverell, English politician
