= James Ewing (MP) =

British politician

James Ewing (11 January 1784 – 18 December 1852) was a British politician. He was a Member of Parliament for Wareham, 1830–1831.

== Family ==
Ewing was an Irishman, whose father may have been James Ewing from Dublin or James Ewing from Londonderry. He believed himself to have been born in Dublin, but had trouble proving his birth details.

Ewing married three times, firstly in 1812 to Mary Ann Carige (resulting in 1 daughter), but she died the following year. His second marriage was in 1816 to Jane Morton, and lasted until her death in 1842. They had at least three daughters together. His last marriage was to Louisa Dick in 1843; they had one daughter.

== East India Company appointments ==
In 1803 Ewing was appointed to the East India Company and arrived in India in February 1804, as a minor legal official. Ewing's first two marriages took place in India, and he made 'a considerable fortune' there.

Ewing's uncle, Robert Ewing of Londonderry and York Place, Portman Square London died in December 1827, leaving an estate of less than £60,000. Ewing inherited two thirds of the estate, with the other third going to his sister Margaret Curwen. Another sister, Martha, was disinherited for secretly marrying an unsuitable man.

Ewing returned to England in 1828 and purchased the Wareham seat in Parliament from John Calcraft. He was returned unopposed in 1830. He is not recorded as making any speech in the House, and left in 1831 when Parliament was dissolved.

In 1832 Ewing had bought the manor of Magdalen Laver in Essex from John Cozens.

Ewing died in Richmond, Surrey in December 1852. He was survived by his second daughter (the eldest with his second wife), Anna Caroline Morton, who in 1843 had married Caledon Du Pré Alexander of Auberies, Essex, son of Josias Alexander.

== Not MP for Glasgow ==
Ewing is frequently confused with James Ewing of Strathleven (1775–1853) MP for Glasgow, 1832–1835 and co-founder of the Glasgow Necropolis. This James Ewing purchased Strathleven House, Dumbartonshire, in 1830. He was elected a Fellow of the Royal Society of Edinburgh his proposer being Thomas Kinnear.

Parliament of the United Kingdom
Preceded by Charles Baring Wall; John Calcraft	Member of Parliament for Wareham; 1830 – 1831; With: John Calcraft	Succeeded by Charles Wood; Granby Hales Calcraft
