= William Gordon (Rochester MP) =

English politician

William Gordon (c. 1735 - 29 March 1776) was an English politician who sat in the House of Commons from 1768 to 1771.

Gordon was High Sheriff of Kent in 1763.

In 1768 Gordon was elected Member of Parliament (MP) for Rochester and held the seat until 1771 when he resigned by taking Stewardship of the Chiltern Hundreds. He then (in 1772) accepted the post of Commissioner of the Victualling Office.

Gordon lived at a place called Bully Hill at Rochester and died in possession of it in 1776, leaving an only daughter.

Parliament of Great Britain
Preceded by Charles Hardy; Grey Cooper	Member of Parliament for Rochester; 1768–1771; With: John Calcraft	Succeeded by John Calcraft; Thomas Pye
