= Thomas Lambert (died 1604) =

English politician

Thomas Lambert (died 1604), of Winchester, Hampshire, was an English politician.

Lambert was a Member of Parliament for Wareham in 1586, during the reign of Elizabeth I of England.
