= 1765 Rochester by-election =

UK parliamentary by-election

The 1765 Rochester by-election was a parliamentary by-election held in England on 23 December 1765 for the House of Commons constituency of Rochester in Kent. It was caused by the death of sitting MP Admiral Isaac Townsend and won by the Tory candidate Grey Cooper.

John Calcraft stood on the independent interest but was narrowly defeated by the government candidate Grey Cooper; Rochester was generally considered to be a safe government borough, and a less wealthy candidate would have had no chance. At the next General Election Calcraft secured government support for his second candidacy at Rochester, where he was duly elected.

Rochester by-election, 1765
Party	Candidate	Votes	%	±%
Tory	Grey Cooper	265		
Whig	John Calcraft	235		
Majority				
Turnout				
Tory hold		Swing		
