= Isaac Townsend =

Royal Navy officer and politician (1685–1765)

Admiral Isaac Townsend
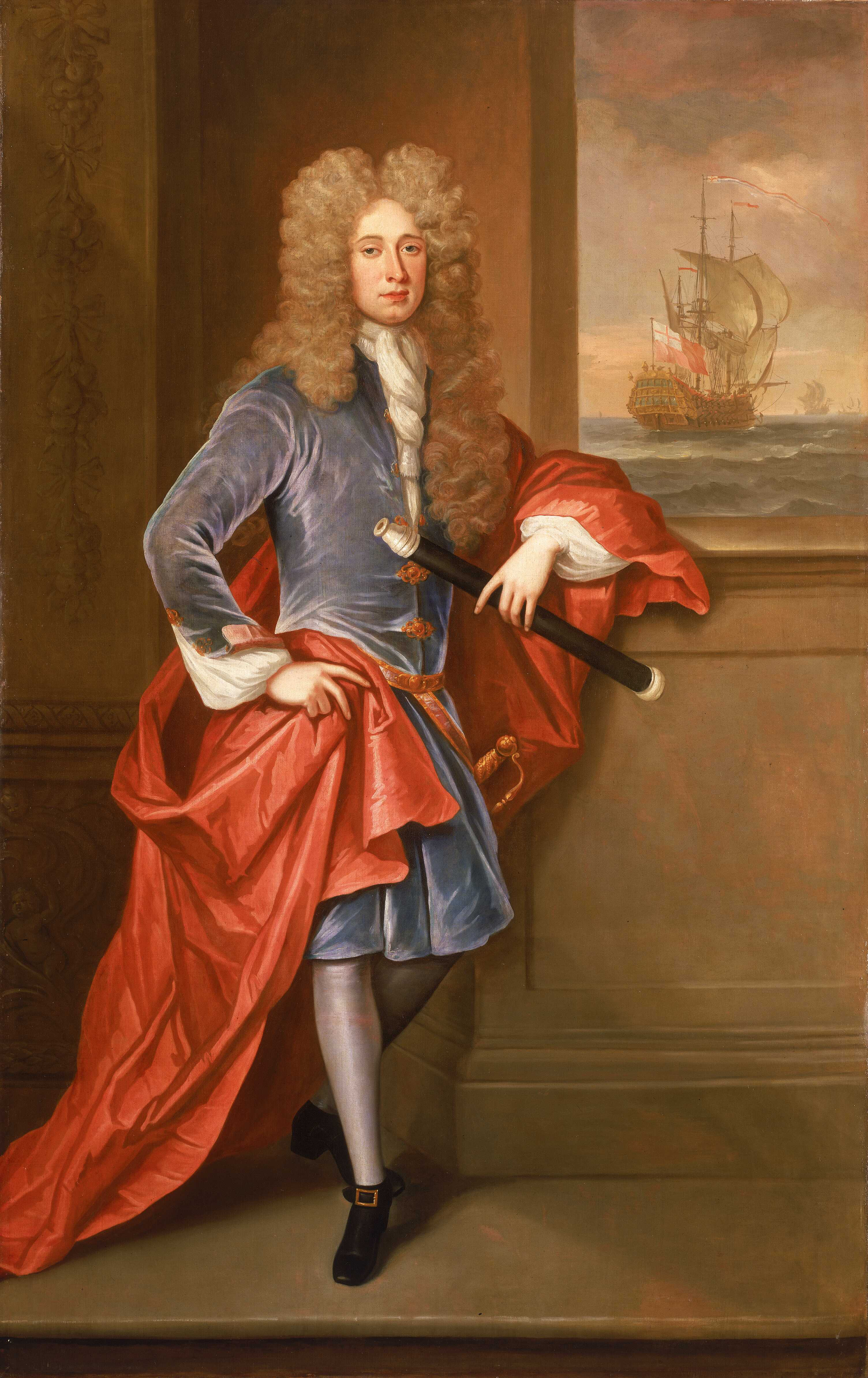
- Born: c. 1685
- Died: November 21, 1765 (aged 79–80)
- Military career
- Allegiance: Kingdom of Great Britain
- Branch: Royal Navy
- Rank: Admiral
- Commands: Greenwich Hospital
- Conflicts: War of Jenkins' Ear

Admiral Isaac Townsend (c. 1685 – 21 November 1765) was a Royal Navy officer and politician.

A post-captain from 1720, Townsend commanded various ships. As captain of HMS Shrewsbury he took part in the expedition against Cartagena in 1741. He was promoted to rear admiral in 1744, vice admiral in 1746 and admiral in 1747. He was also an Elder Brother of Trinity House.

He entered Parliament in 1744 as member for the naval port of Portsmouth, and represented that town until 1754. He did not stand for re-election in 1754, when the Admiralty supported two other admirals as its candidates. He became governor of Greenwich Hospital in 1754, and in this capacity in 1757 he had custody of Admiral Byng, who was under arrest there before his court-martial. After Byng's execution, Townsend was chosen to take his place as MP for Rochester, another borough in the Admiralty's gift, and was MP for that city for the rest of his life. He was regarded as a reliable voter for the government, but seems never to have spoken in the House.

He was elected a Fellow of the Royal Society in February 1750.

Townsend married Elizabeth Larcum, daughter of William Larcum, a surgeon, and they had one son and one daughter. He died in 1765.

He is frequently confused with his uncle, a naval officer also named Isaac Townsend (d.1731) who is commemorated by a substantial memorial in the north transept of Winchester Cathedral.

Parliament of Great Britain
Preceded by Martin Bladen; Captain Sir Charles Hardy	Member of Parliament for Portsmouth; 1744–1754; With: Martin Bladen 1744–1746; Thomas Gore 1746–1747; Captain Edward Legge 1747; Rear Admiral Sir Edward Hawke 1747–1754	Succeeded by Rear Admiral Sir Edward Hawke; Admiral Sir William Rowley
Preceded by Admiral Nicholas Haddock; Admiral the Hon. John Byng	Member of Parliament for Rochester; 1757–1765; With: Admiral Nicholas Haddock 1757–1761; Viscount Parker 1761–1764; Admiral Sir Charles Hardy 1764–1765	Succeeded by Admiral Sir Charles Hardy; Grey Cooper
Military offices
Preceded by Lord Archibald Hamilton	Governor, Greenwich Hospital; 1754–1765	Succeeded by Sir George Rodney
