= Thomas Musgrave (bishop) =

Archbishop of York from 1847 to 1860

The Most Reverend and Right Honourable Thomas Musgrave
- Archbishop of York
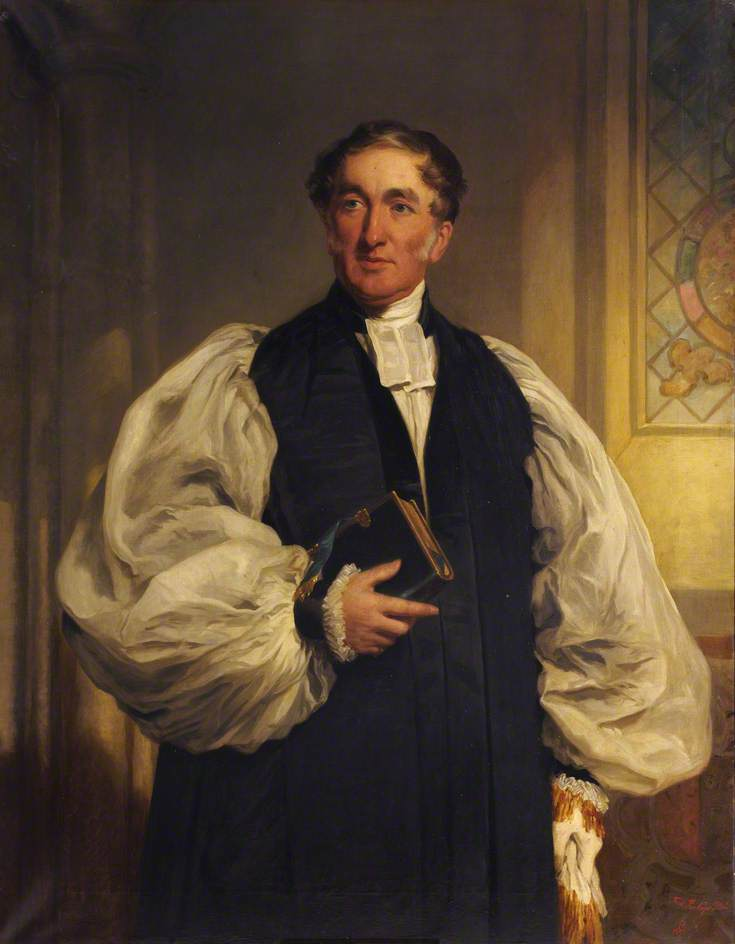
- Portrait by Frederick Richard Say
- Church: Church of England
- Province: Province of York
- Diocese: Diocese of York
- Elected: 1847
- Term ended: 1860
- Predecessor: Edward Harcourt
- Successor: Charles Longley
- Other post: Bishop of Hereford

Personal details
- Born: 30 March 1788 Slaughter House Lane, Cambridge
- Died: 4 May 1860 (aged 72) Belgrave Square, London
- Buried: Kensal Green Cemetery
- Denomination: Anglican
- Spouse: Catherine Cavendish
- Education: Richmond Grammar School
- Alma mater: Trinity College, Cambridge

Thomas Musgrave (30 March 1788 – 4 May 1860) was Archbishop of York from 1847 to 1860.

== Life ==
Musgrave was the son of William Peet Musgrave (b.1756), a wealthy tailor and woollen-draper of Cambridge, and Sarah his wife. He was born in Slaughter House Lane on 30 March 1788, and baptised at the parish church of Great St. Mary's on 25 April. He and his two brothers - the elder of whom, Charles Musgrave, became eventually archdeacon of Craven - were educated at Richmond Grammar School, then at the zenith of its reputation under Dr Tate.

In 1804 he was admitted as a pensioner of Trinity College, Cambridge, and in 1807 was elected scholar. In 1810 he graduated B.A. as fourteenth wrangler, when William Henry Maule was senior wrangler, and Thomas Shaw Brandreth second. In 1811, he was members' prizeman and in 1813 he took his M.A..

Musgrave was elected junior fellow in 1812, and senior fellow in 1832. In 1821, though his knowledge of eastern tongues was by no means profound, he was appointed Lord Almoner's Professor of Arabic. He was Senior Proctor in 1831.

He took holy orders, and filled in succession the college livings of Over (1823), St. Mary's, Cambridge (1825–1833), and Bottisham (1837). He became senior bursar of his college in 1825, and during a long tenure of the office, only resigning it when he left Cambridge in 1837, his sound judgment and practical knowledge of business proved of great service. He was also an active and judicious county magistrate.

In politics, he was a decided liberal, but "without any admixture of party spirit". He was a warm advocate for the relaxation of all religious tests on admission to university degrees. The petition which in March 1834 was presented to both Houses of Parliament with that object, lay at his rooms for signature.

In May 1834, the pressure put upon Connop Thirlwall, afterwards Bishop of St. David's, by the Master, Dr. Christopher Wordsworth, which led Thirlwall to resign his tutorship, excited Musgrave's indignation. He and Sedgwick drew up a paper addressed to the Master, which was signed by George Peacock, afterwards Dean of Ely, Romilly, and others, calling upon him to summon a meeting of the seniority to take the matter into consideration.

Musgrave's university distinction and liberal politics marked him out for preferment from the Whig government. His first senior Church of England appointment was when he was installed Dean of Bristol on 13 or 14 May 1837. Three months later, he was nominated Bishop of Hereford by the Crown on 5 August and consecrated on 1 October 1837, by Archbishop Howley at Lambeth. At Hereford, he revived the office of rural dean, and was instrumental in setting up the Diocesan Church Building Society.

On the death of Archbishop Edward Harcourt in 1847, he was translated to the archbishopric of York on 10 December 1847. His enthronement took place in York Minster on 15 January 1848.

Musgrave donated £10 to the Cambridge Royal Albert Benevolent Society in 1850, for them to build almshouses, now the Cambridge Royal Albert Homes CIO.

Musgrave died on 4 May 1860, aged 72. He is buried at Kensal Green Cemetery, London.

A memorial to Musgrave was erected in York Minster in 1855 sculpted by Matthew Noble.

== Family ==
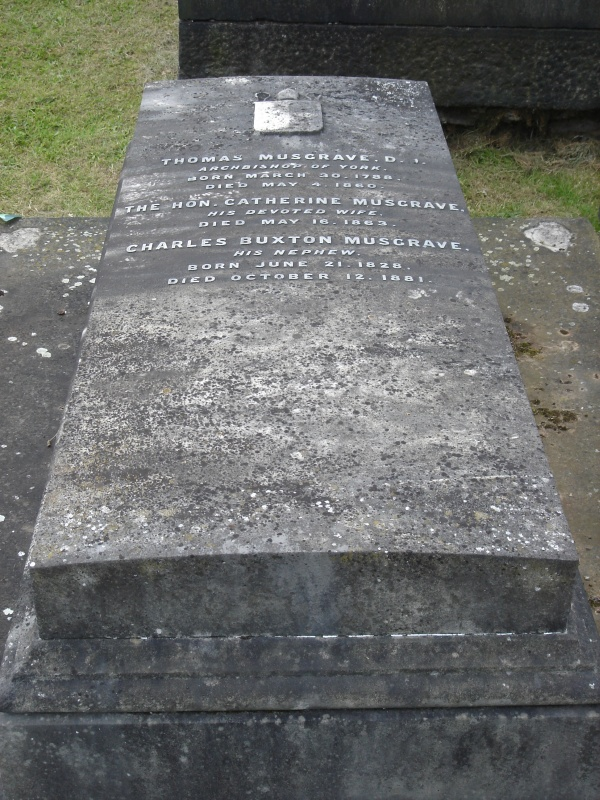
Funerary monument, Kensal Green Cemetery, London

On 12 December 1839, he married Hon. Catherine Cavendish, daughter of Richard Cavendish, 2nd Baron Waterpark and Juliana Cooper.

== Arms ==
Coat of arms of Thomas Musgrave
Notes While serving as a bishop Musgrave's arms would be displayed impaled with those of the diocese and topped by a mitre. Escutcheon Azure six annulets in pile Argent.

== Bibliography ==
- Fryde, E. B.; Greenway, D. E.; Porter, S.; Roy, I., eds. (2003) [1986]. Handbook of British Chronology (3rd ed.). Cambridge: Cambridge University Press. ISBN 0-521-56350-X.
- Horn, J. M. (1996). Bristol, Gloucester, Oxford and Peterborough Dioceses. Fasti Ecclesiae Anglicanae 1541–1857. Vol. 8. British History Online.
- Horn, J. M.; Smith, D. M. (1979). York Diocese. Fasti Ecclesiae Anglicanae 1541–1857. Vol. 4. British History Online.

Church of England titles
Preceded by Henry Beeke	Dean of Bristol; 1837	Succeeded by John Lamb
Preceded by Edward Grey	Bishop of Hereford; 1837–1847	Succeeded by Renn Dickson Hampden
Preceded by Edward Venables-Vernon-Harcourt	Archbishop of York; 1847–1860	Succeeded by Charles Longley
