= Richard Smith (East India Company officer) =

- Born: baptised 1734
- Died: 3 July 1803
- Military career
- Allegiance: Kingdom of Great Britain
- Branch: British Army
- Rank: Brigadier-General
- Commands: Indian Army

Brigadier-General Richard Smith (baptised 1734 – 3 July 1803) was Commander-in-Chief, India of the East India Company (Bengal).

== Early life ==
He was the eldest son of John Smith, cheesemonger, of Jermyn Street, St. James’s, in what is now central London.

== Military career ==
He served in India as an ensign in the Madras Army in 1752, rising to the rank of captain. In 1761 returned to London and became a prominent shareholder in the East India Company.

When he went out to India again in 1764 it was as Colonel of one of the East India Company's three brigades. In 1767 he was promoted to Commander-in-Chief, India. He was made Brigadier-General in 1768 before retiring in 1770.

== Political career ==
In 1774 he went into politics and was briefly elected to Parliament as the member for Hindon, Wiltshire, by spending 15 guineas per vote. On petition the election was declared void due to bribery by the winning candidates. He and his fellow candidate, Thomas Brand Hollis, were prosecuted, fined one thousand marks, and imprisoned for six months. In a rerun of the election Brand Hollis withdrew his name but Smith was re-elected.

He later served as MP for Wendover in 1780 and as MP for Wareham in 1790. He was appointed High Sheriff of Berkshire for 1779–80.

He became notorious as a nabob, one of the Englishmen returned from India with considerable wealth. He was "reputed to have made between £200,000 and £300,000 in India". and may have served as a "type" for Samuel Foote's 1772 play of that title. He was satirically attacked by a Captain Joseph Price and a portrait of him appeared opposite that of Elizabeth Armistead (one of the favourite courtesans, and eventually the wife, of Charles James Fox) in Town and Country Magazine. He gambled huge amounts, on horses and at cards, and is said to have lost heavily to Fox.

== Family and descendants ==
He lived at Chilton Lodge near Hungerford in Berkshire. In 1756 he married Amelia Hopkins, the daughter of master mariner Captain Charles Hopkins. His Oxford Dictionary of National Biography entry says only that the couple had a son and a daughter, without naming them. He is also known to have had an illegitimate daughter via his sister-in-law Sarah Hopkins. This daughter was named Amelia and she later married William Marsh. The History of Parliament contains a biography both for him, stating that in 1780 he purchased a seat at Wendover for an unnamed son, and for a John Mansell Smith, which says he was the only son of Richard Smith.

Military offices
Preceded by Lord Clive	Commander-in-Chief, India; 1767–1770	Succeeded by Sir Robert Barker
Parliament of Great Britain
Preceded by Thomas Dummer	Member of Parliament for Wendover; 1780–1784; With: John Mansell Smith	Succeeded by Robert Burton
Preceded by John Calcraft	Member of Parliament for Wareham; 1790–1796; With: Lord Robert Spencer	Succeeded by Charles Ellis
