= Henry Ashley (MP, born 1548) =

English politician

Member of Parliament for Poole
- In office 1589

Member of Parliament for Christchurch
- In office 1586

Member of Parliament for Wareham
- In office 1572

Personal details
- Born: 1548
- Died: After 1605
- Parents: Henry Ashley (father); Katharine Basset (mother)
- Relatives: Basset family John Basset (uncle); Anne Basset (aunt); George Basset (uncle); James Basset (uncle); John Basset (grandfather); Honor Grenville (grandmother)

Henry Ashley (1548 – after 1605) was an English politician.

He was a Member (MP) of the Parliament of England for Wareham in 1572, Christchurch in 1586 and Poole in 1589.
