= John Mayhew (fl. 1414) =

English politician

John Mayhew was an English politician who sat as MP for Wareham in April 1414.

He married Alice and they had one son, John Mayhew and one daughter, Eleanor, the wife of Thomas Leycer.
