= John Orenge =

16th-century English politician

John Orenge (by 1480 – 1538 or later), of London, Exeter and Plymouth, Devon and Wimborne Minster, Dorset, was an English politician.

== Family ==
His father was also an MP named John Orenge.

== Career ==
He was a Member (MP) of the Parliament of England for Exeter in 1504 and 1510, for Plymouth in 1515 and for Wareham in 1529.
