= Sir Theodore Brinckman, 2nd Baronet =

British Liberal politician and soldier

Sir Theodore Henry Brinckman, 2nd Baronet DL (12 September 1830 – 7 May 1905) was a British Liberal politician and soldier.

He was the son of Sir Theodore Brinckman, 1st Baronet and his first wife Hon. Charlotte Godolphin Osborne, only daughter of Francis Osborne, 1st Baron Godolphin. In 1880, he succeeded his father as baronet. Brinckman was educated at Eton and served then in the 17th Regiment of Foot. He fought in the Crimean War and reached the rank of captain. Brinckman was Deputy Lieutenant of Tower Hamlets and sat as Member of Parliament (MP) for Canterbury from 1868 to 1874.

On 18 July 1861, he married Lady Cecilia Augusta Conyngham, youngest daughter of Francis Conyngham, 2nd Marquess Conyngham at St George's, Hanover Square. They lived at St. Leonard's in Clewer near Windsor in Berkshire and had two sons. Brinckman was succeeded in the baronetcy by his older son Theodore Francis Brinckman, whose first wife was Fanny Lucy Radmall, later better known as Lucy, Lady Houston.

Parliament of the United Kingdom
Preceded by Henry Butler-Johnstone; John Walter Huddleston	Member of Parliament for Canterbury; 1868 – 1874; With: Henry Butler-Johnstone	Succeeded by Henry Butler-Johnstone; Lewis Ashurst Majendie
Baronetage of the United Kingdom
Preceded by Theodore Brinckman	Baronet (of Monk Bretton); 1880 – 1905	Succeeded by Theodore Brinckman
