= Sir Theodore Brinckman, 1st Baronet =

British politician and baronet

Sir Theodore Henry Lavington Brinckman, 1st Baronet (17 January 1798 – 9 February 1880) was a British politician and baronet.

Born Theodore Broadhead, he was the son of Theodore Henry Broadhead and his wife Elizabeth Macdougall, daughter of William Gordon Macdougall. In 1842, by Royal Licence, he and his brothers resumed the surname Brinckman, which the family had carried before 1786 and their grandfather had changed.

In 1821 he entered the British House of Commons in a by-election for Yarmouth, the same constituency his father has represented before and was a Member of Parliament until 1826. On 30 September 1831, Brinckman was created a baronet, of Burton or Monk Bretton, in the County of York.

He married firstly Hon. Charlotte Godolphin Osborne, only daughter of the 1st Baron Godolphin on 29 August 1829. She died in 1838, and Brinckman married secondly Annabella Corbet, daughter of John Corbet on 18 February 1841. He had five children by his first wife, a daughter and four sons. They lived at St. Leonard's in Clewer near Windsor in Berkshire. Brinckman died, aged 82 and was succeeded in the baronetcy by his oldest son Theodore.

Parliament of the United Kingdom
Preceded by Theodore Henry Broadhead; Sir Peter Pole	Member of Parliament for Yarmouth (Isle of Wight); 1821 – 1826; With: Sir Peter Pole	Succeeded by Joseph Phillimore; Lord Binning
Baronetage of the United Kingdom
New creation	Baronet (of Monk Bretton); 1831–1880	Succeeded by Theodore Brinckman
