= Nicholas atte Gate =

English politician

Nicholas Gate (fl. 1383–1397) was an English politician. He sat as MP for Wareham in February 1383, 1391, and September 1397.

He also served as bailiff of Wareham from Michaelmas 1390 till 1391.
