= Grey Cooper =

English politician

Grey Cooper (c. 1726 – 30 July 1801) was an English politician who sat in the House of Commons between 1765 and 1790 and was Secretary to the Treasury under various administrations.

== Life ==
Cooper was the son of William Cooper MD of Newcastle upon Tyne. He was educated at Durham School and Trinity College, Cambridge where he was scholar in 1745 and was awarded BA in 1747 and MA in 1750. He was admitted at Inner Temple on 17 July 1747 and was called to the bar. He became a Fellow of Trinity College in 1749.

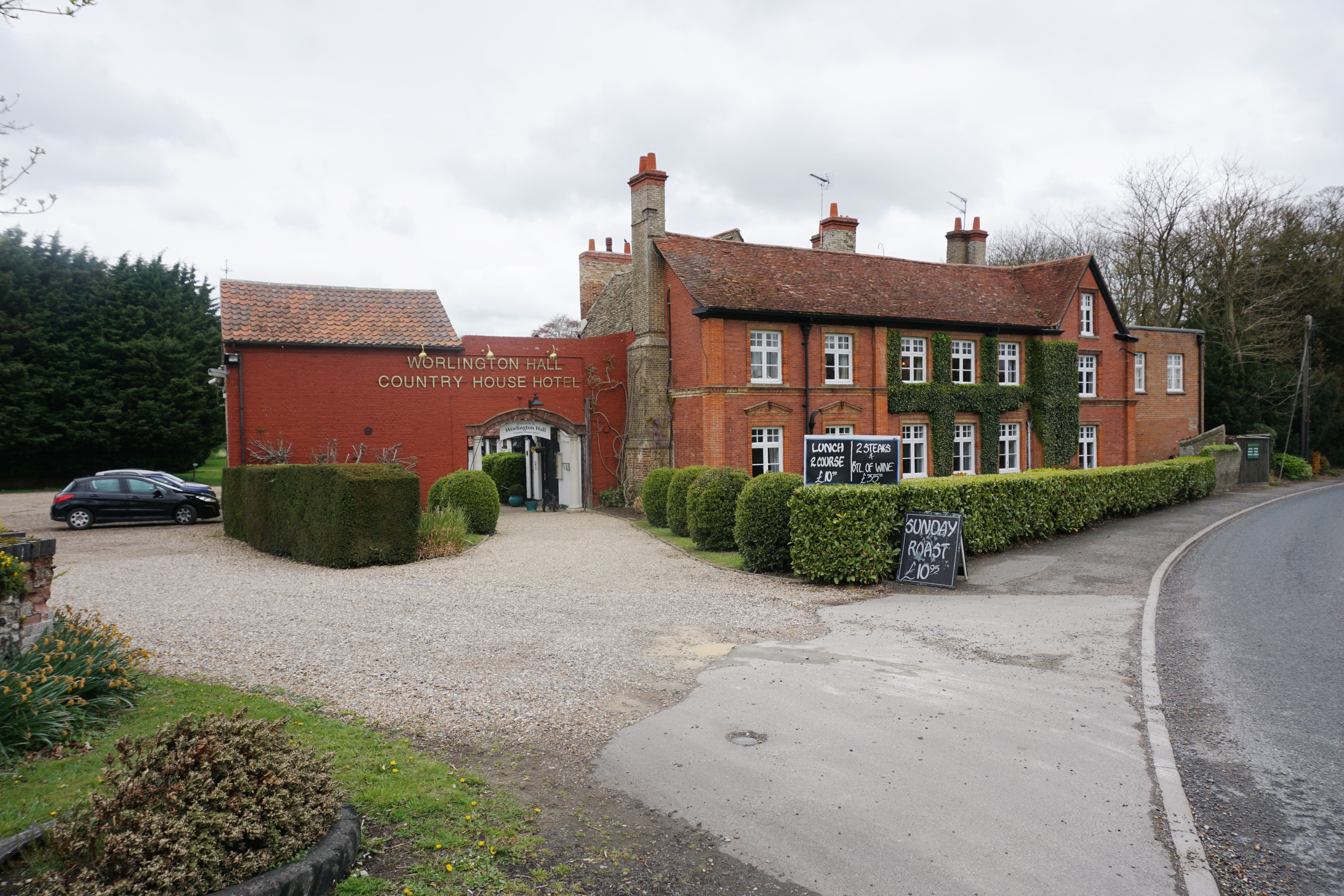
Worlington Hall - now a hotel

He was a Member of Parliament (MP) for Rochester from 1765 to 1768. He was an MP for Grampound, Cornwall from 1768 to 1774. He was an MP for Saltash from 1774 to 1784 and MP for Richmond, Yorkshire from 1786 to 1790. For much of his career he was Secretary of the Treasury under various administrations.

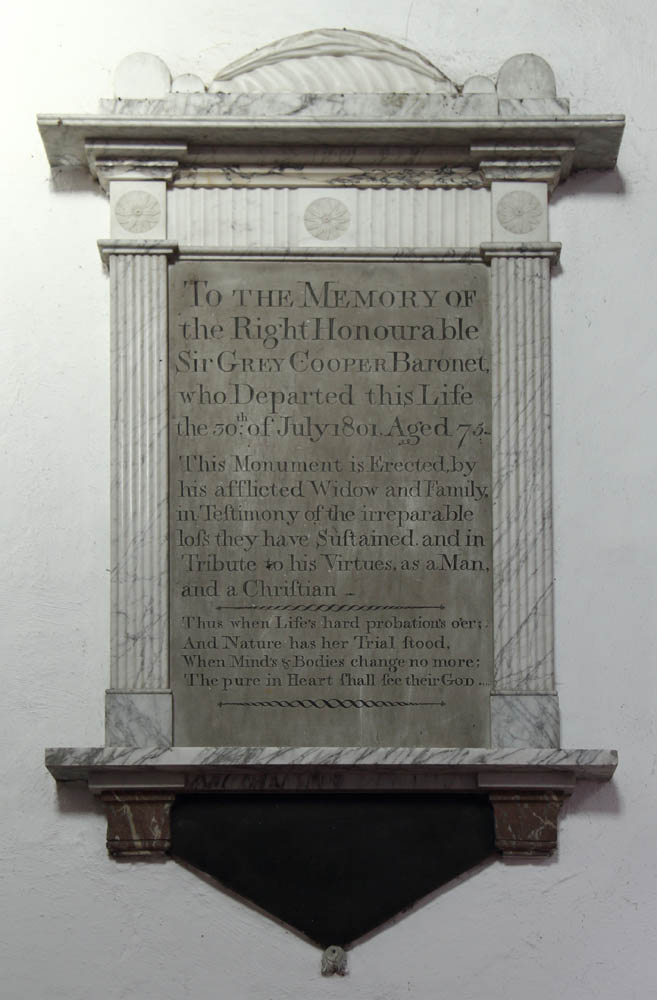
Wall monument to Grey Cooper in All Saints Church, Worlington

He claimed to have inherited the baronetcy of Cooper of Gogan from 1775 on, thus calling himself Sir Grey Cooper, Bart.; whether that baronetcy ever existed and whether Cooper was heir to it are doubtful. In 1799 he acquired the manor of Worlington, near Bury St Edmunds, Suffolk and lived at Worlington Hall, the 16th century manor house.

Grey died suddenly in 1801 at his home and was buried at All Saints Church, Worlington. He had married twice; firstly in 1753 Margaret, the daughter of Sir Henry Grey, 1st Baronet, of Howick, Northumberland and secondly, in 1762, Elizabeth Kennedy of Newcastle upon Tyne, with whom he had 2 sons and 2 daughters. He was succeeded by his son, Sir Frederic Grey-Cooper, who married Josepha Newton, daughter of Francis Milner Newton.

Parliament of Great Britain
Preceded by Admiral Sir Charles Hardy; Admiral Isaac Townsend	Member of Parliament for Rochester; 1765–1768; With: Admiral Sir Charles Hardy	Succeeded by John Calcraft; William Gordon
Preceded by Merrick Burrell; Simon Fanshawe	Member of Parliament for Grampound; 1768–1774; With: Charles Wolfran Cornwall	Succeeded by Sir Joseph Yorke; Richard Neville
Preceded by Martin Hawke; Thomas Bradshaw	Member of Parliament for Saltash; 1774–1784; With: Thomas Bradshaw to 1775; Sir Charles Whitworth 1775–1778; Henry Strachey 1778–1780; Paul Wentworth 1780; Charles Jenkinson from 1780	Succeeded by Charles Ambler; Charles Jenkinson
Preceded by Charles Dundas; Earl of Inchiquin	Member of Parliament for Richmond; 1786–1790; With: Earl of Inchiquin	Succeeded by Lawrence Dundas; Earl of Inchiquin
