= John Calcraft (1831–1868) =

British politician

Member of Parliament for Wareham
- In office 13 July 1865 – 1 December 1868
- Preceded by: John Erle-Drax
- Succeeded by: John Erle-Drax

Personal details
- Born: 4 May 1831
- Died: 1 December 1868 (aged 37)
- Party: Liberal
- Parent(s): John Hales Calcraft; Lady Caroline Katherine Montagu
- Relatives: John Calcraft (grandfather); John Calcraft (great-grandfather)

John Hales Montagu Calcraft (4 May 1831 – 1 December 1868) was a British Liberal Party politician.

Calcraft was the son of former Wareham MP John Hales Calcraft and Lady Caroline Katherine Montagu, daughter of William Montagu, 5th Duke of Manchester. His brother Henry George Calcraft was permanent secretary to the Board of Trade.

Calcraft followed in the footsteps of his father and his grandfather, John Calcraft, when he was elected MP for Wareham at the 1865 general election, and was re-elected at the 1868 election, yet shortly after died.

Parliament of the United Kingdom
Preceded by John Erle-Drax	Member of Parliament for Wareham; 1865–1868	Succeeded by John Erle-Drax
