= Isaac Romilly =

Isaac Romilly (c.1710–1759) was an English businessman of Huguenot background, and a Fellow of the Royal Society.

He was the son of Etienne Romilly, a French migrant in London, and his wife Judith de Montsallier. His brother Peter was father of Samuel Romilly. He was in business with Samuel Fludyer and his brother Thomas.

Romilly became a Fellow of the Royal Society in May 1757. He died on 18 December 1759, aged 49, and was buried in St Bride's, Fleet Street.
