= Thomas Barbour (MP for Wareham) =

English politician

Thomas Barbour (fl. 1394–1421) was an English politician. He sat as MP for Wareham in 1395 and 1399.

He also served as collector of customs and subsidies in Melcombe Regis and adjacent ports from 24 March 1401 till November 1417; tax collector of Dorset in December 1402; and alnager of Dorset from 13 February 1405 till 1410.

He married Agnes.
