= Wareham (constituency) =

UK House of Commons borough (1302–1885)

- Former borough constituency for the House of Commons

1302–1885
- Seats: two (1302–1832); one (1832–1885)
- Replaced by: East Dorset

Wareham was a parliamentary borough in Dorset, which elected two Members of Parliament (MPs) to the House of Commons from 1302 until 1832, and then one member from 1832 until 1885, when the borough was abolished.

== History ==
The borough consisted of the town of Wareham on the Isle of Purbeck, a market town close to Poole Harbour. In 1831, the population of the borough was 1,676, and it contained 364 houses.

The right to vote was exercised by the Mayor, magistrates and freemen of the town and all inhabitants paying scot and lot; the number who were qualified to vote under this provision by the time of the Reform Act 1832 was unknown, as there had not been a contested election for many years, but there were about 500 in the 1760s. In the early 18th century a number of wealthy local families were influential over the choice of members, but eventually John Calcraft of Kingstone Hall secured total control by buying up all the property in the borough occupied by potential voters.

Wareham retained one of its two MPs under the Reform Act 1832, but its boundaries were extended to include several surrounding areas, including nearby Corfe Castle which had previously been a borough in its own right. The new borough had a population of 5,751.

The borough continued to elect one MP until the Representation of the People Act 1884, which came into effect at the general election of 1885. This abolished the constituency, Wareham being placed in the new East Dorset county division.

== Members of Parliament ==
=== 1302–1629 ===
- Constituency created (1302)

Parliament	First member	Second member
1386	Thomas Walbrond	Walter Byle
1388 (Feb)	Thomas Walbrond	Walter Byle
1388 (Sep)	Thomas Walbrond	Robert Calche
1390 (Jan)	Adam Denys	Robert Calche
1390 (Nov)
1391	Nicholas atte Gate	Henry Rauf
1393	Walter Byle	Robert Calche
1394	Adam Denys	Thomas Smithfield
1395	Richard Byle	Thomas Barbour
1397 (Jan)	Walter Byle	Adam Denys
1397 (Sep)	Nicholas atte Gate	Robert Cokeman
1399	Adam Denys	Thomas Barbour
1401
1402	Robert Calche	Richard Byle
1404 (Jan)
1404 (Oct)
1406	Robert Craford	John Cheverell
1407	John Gramford	William Colyns
1410	Robert Craford	Thomas Walsingham
1411
1413 (Feb)
1413 (May)	Robert Craford	Thomas Faringdon
1414 (Apr)	Richard Byle	John Mayhew
1414 (Nov)	William Gerard	John Shoyll
1415
1416 (Mar)
1416 (Oct)
1417	William Gerard	Robert Craford
1419	William Gerard	Robert Craford
1420	William Gerard	Walter Reson
1421 (May)	William Gerard	Walter Reson
1421 (Dec)	William Gerard	Walter Provost
1455	Alexander Browning	
1510–1523	No names known	
1529	John Orenge	William Grimston
1536
1539	?	
1542	?	
1545	Thomas Phelips	Robert Keyle
1547	David Seymour	Richard Morison
1553 (Mar)	?Richard Phelips	?
1553 (Nov)	Thomas Phelips	Leonard Willoughby
1554	Alexander Hughes	Thomas Girdler
Parliament of 1554–1555	Hugh Smith	Roger Gerard
Parliament of 1555	Thomas Phelips	Clement Hyatt
Parliament of 1558	Matthew Smythe	Walter Raleigh
Parliament of 1559	Sir John Perrot	John Scriven
Parliament of 1563–1567	John Morrice	Richard Shaw
Parliament of 1571	John Baker	Clement Hyatt died during the 1572–81 Parliament; In his place Henry Ashley
Parliament of 1572–1581	John Gwynne	Clement Hyatt died during the 1572–81 Parliament; In his place Henry Ashley
Parliament of 1584–1585	John Rogers	Andrew Rogers
Parliament of 1586–1587	John Rogers	Thomas Lambert
Parliament of 1588–1589	John Rogers	Christopher Gerrard
Parliament of 1593	Thomas Rogers	George Strode
Parliament of 1597–1598	John Frankland	Sampson Hussey
Parliament of 1601	Sir John Stafford	Edmund Scott
Parliament of 1604–1611	Robert Napier	Dr Francis James
Addled Parliament (1614)	John Freke	(Sir) William Pitt
Parliament of 1621–1622	John Trenchard	(Sir) William Pitt
Happy Parliament (1624–1625)	John Trenchard	(Sir) William Pitt
Useless Parliament (1625)	John Trenchard	(Sir) William Pitt
Parliament of 1625–1626	Sir Nathaniel Napier	Edward Lawrence
Parliament of 1628–1629	Gerrard Napier	Sir John Meller
No Parliament summoned 1629–1640

=== 1640–1832 ===
Year	First member	First party	Second member	Second party
April 1640	John Trenchard	Parliamentarian	Dr Gilbert Jones	
November 1640	John Trenchard	Parliamentarian	Thomas Erle	Parliamentarian
December 1648	John Trenchard	Parliamentarian	Erle excluded in Pride's Purge – seat vacant	
1653	Wareham was unrepresented in the Barebones Parliament and the First and Second Parliaments of the Protectorate			
January 1659	Elias Bond		James Dewey	
May 1659	John Trenchard		One seat vacant	
April 1660	George Pitt		Robert Culliford	
1679	Thomas Erle	Whig	George Savage	
1685	Thomas Erle	Whig	George Ryves	
May 1689	Thomas Erle	Whig	Thomas Skinner	
1690	Thomas Erle	Whig	William Okeden	
1695	Thomas Erle	Whig	Thomas Trenchard	
1698	George Pitt		Thomas Trenchard	
January 1701	George Pitt		Thomas Erle	Whig
March 1701	George Pitt		Sir Edward Ernle	
November 1701	George Pitt		Thomas Erle	Whig
1702	Sir Josiah Child		Thomas Erle	Whig
1704	Sir Edward Ernle		Thomas Erle	Whig
1705	George Pitt		Thomas Erle	Whig
1710	Sir Edward Ernle		Thomas Erle	Whig
1713	George Pitt		Thomas Erle	Whig
1715	George Pitt, junior		Thomas Erle	Whig
1718	George Pitt, junior		Henry Drax	
1722	Sir Edward Ernle		Joseph Gascoigne	
12 February 1729	Sir Edward Ernle		Nathaniel Gould	
26 February 1729	Thomas Tower		Nathaniel Gould	
1734	Henry Drax		John Pitt	
1747	Henry Drax		Thomas Erle Drax	
1748	Robert Banks Hodgkinson		John Pitt	
1751	Robert Banks Hodgkinson		Henry Drax	
April 1754	Seats vacant after disputed election			
December 1754	William Augustus Pitt		Henry Drax	
1755	William Augustus Pitt		Edward Drax	
1761	Thomas Erle Drax		John Pitt	
March 1768	Ralph Burton		Robert Palk	
November 1768	Whitshed Keene		Robert Palk	
January 1774	Thomas de Grey		Robert Palk	
October 1774	William Gerard Hamilton		Christopher D'Oyly	
1780	John Boyd		Thomas Farrer	
1784	Charles Lefebure		Thomas Farrer	
1786	John Calcraft		Thomas Farrer	
1790	General Richard Smith		Lord Robert Spencer	
May 1796	Charles Ellis		Lord Robert Spencer	
November 1796	Sir Godfrey Vassall		Lord Robert Spencer	
1799	Sir Godfrey Vassall		Joseph Hankey	
1800	John Calcraft	Whig	Joseph Hankey	
1802	John Calcraft	Whig	Andrew Strahan	
1806	Jonathan Raine		Andrew Strahan	
1807	Sir Granby Calcraft		Hon. John Ward	Tory
1808	Sir Samuel Romilly	Whig	Hon. John Ward	Tory
1812	Robert Gordon		Theodore Broadhead	
1818	John Calcraft	Whig	Thomas Denman	Whig
1820	John Calcraft	Whig	John Hales Calcraft	Tory
1826	John Calcraft	Whig	Charles Baring Wall	Tory
1828	John Calcraft	Tory	Charles Baring Wall	Tory
1830	John Calcraft	Tory	James Ewing	Whig
1831	Granby Calcraft	Whig	Charles Wood	Whig
1832	Representation reduced to one Member			

=== 1832–1885 ===
Year	Member	Party
1832	John Hales Calcraft	Tory
1834	John Hales Calcraft	Conservative
1841	John Erle-Drax	Whig
1852	John Erle-Drax	Conservative
1857	John Hales Calcraft	Whig
1859	John Erle-Drax	Conservative
1865	John Calcraft	Liberal
1868	John Erle-Drax	Conservative
1880	Montague Guest	Liberal
1885	Constituency abolished	

== Election results ==
=== Elections in the 1830s ===
General election 1830: Wareham
Party	Candidate	Votes	%
Tory	John Calcraft	Unopposed	
Whig	James Ewing	Unopposed	
Tory hold			
Whig hold			

General election 1831: Wareham
Party	Candidate	Votes	%
Whig	Granby Hales Calcraft	Unopposed	
Whig	Charles Wood	Unopposed	
Whig hold			
Whig gain from Tory			

General election 1832: Wareham
Party	Candidate	Votes	%
Tory	John Hales Calcraft	175	55.6
Whig	John Erle-Drax	140	44.4
Majority		35	11.2
Turnout		315	92.9
Registered electors		339	
Tory gain from Whig			

General election 1835: Wareham
Party	Candidate	Votes	%
Conservative	John Hales Calcraft	Unopposed	
Registered electors		339	
Conservative hold			

General election 1837: Wareham
Party	Candidate	Votes	%
Conservative	John Hales Calcraft	170	52.3
Whig	John Erle-Drax	155	47.7
Majority		15	4.6
Turnout		325	88.3
Registered electors		368	
Conservative hold			

=== Elections in the 1840s ===
General election 1841: Wareham
Party	Candidate	Votes	%	±%
Whig	John Erle-Drax	211	53.0	+5.3
Conservative	John Hales Calcraft	187	47.0	−5.3
Majority		24	6.0	N/A
Turnout		398	90.9	+2.6
Registered electors		438		
Whig gain from Conservative		Swing	+5.3	

General election 1847: Wareham
Party	Candidate	Votes	%	±%
Whig	John Erle-Drax	Unopposed		
Registered electors		442		
Whig hold				

=== Elections in the 1850s ===
General election 1852: Wareham
Party	Candidate	Votes	%	±%
Conservative	John Erle-Drax	Unopposed		
Registered electors		418		
Conservative gain from Whig				

General election 1857: Wareham
Party	Candidate	Votes	%	±%
Whig	John Hales Calcraft	143	50.5	New
Conservative	John Erle-Drax	140	49.5	N/A
Majority		3	1.0	N/A
Turnout		283	90.7	N/A
Registered electors		312		
Whig gain from Conservative		Swing	N/A	

General election 1859: Wareham
Party	Candidate	Votes	%	±%
Conservative	John Erle-Drax	Unopposed		
Registered electors		342		
Conservative gain from Liberal				

=== Elections in the 1860s ===
General election 1865: Wareham
Party	Candidate	Votes	%	±%
Liberal	John Calcraft	125	53.4	New
Conservative	John Erle-Drax	109	46.6	N/A
Majority		16	6.8	N/A
Turnout		234	85.7	N/A
Registered electors		273		
Liberal gain from Conservative		Swing	N/A	

General election 1868: Wareham
Party	Candidate	Votes	%	±%
Liberal	John Calcraft	314	46.0	−7.4
Conservative	John Erle-Drax	301	44.1	−2.5
Conservative	Thomas Fremantle	68	10.0	N/A
Majority		13	1.9	−4.9
Turnout		683	76.4	−9.3
Registered electors		894		
Liberal hold		Swing	−2.5	

Calcraft's death caused a by-election.

By-election, 23 December 1868: Wareham
Party	Candidate	Votes	%	±%
Conservative	John Erle-Drax	374	54.1	+1.0
Liberal	William Montagu Calcraft	305	44.9	−1.0
Majority		69	10.2	N/A
Turnout		679	76.0	−0.4
Registered electors		894		
Conservative gain from Liberal		Swing	+1.1	

=== Elections in the 1870s ===
General election 1874: Wareham
Party	Candidate	Votes	%	±%
Conservative	John Erle-Drax	502	59.9	+5.8
Liberal	Montague Guest	310	37.0	−9.0
Ind. Conservative	Stephen Henry Emmens	26	3.1	New
Majority		192	22.9	N/A
Turnout		838	87.9	+11.5
Registered electors		953		
Conservative gain from Liberal		Swing	+12.4	

=== Elections in the 1880s ===
General election 1880: Wareham
Party	Candidate	Votes	%	±%
Liberal	Montague Guest	451	52.0	+15.0
Conservative	John Erle-Drax	416	48.0	−11.9
Majority		35	4.0	N/A
Turnout		867	87.8	−0.1
Registered electors		987		
Liberal gain from Conservative		Swing	+13.5	
