= John Erle-Drax =

British politician (1800–1887)

Member of Parliament for Wareham
- In office 1841–1857
- Preceded by: John Hales Calcraft
- Succeeded by: John Hales Calcraft
- In office 1859–1865
- Preceded by: John Hales Calcraft
- Succeeded by: John Calcraft
- In office 1868–1880
- Preceded by: John Calcraft
- Succeeded by: Montague Guest

Personal details
- Born: 6 October 1800 Blackmore Vale
- Died: 5 January 1887 (aged 86)
- Party: Conservative (Tory)
- Spouse: Jane Frances Erle-Drax Grosvenor
- Parent: Samuel Elias Sawbridge (father)
- Occupation: Politician

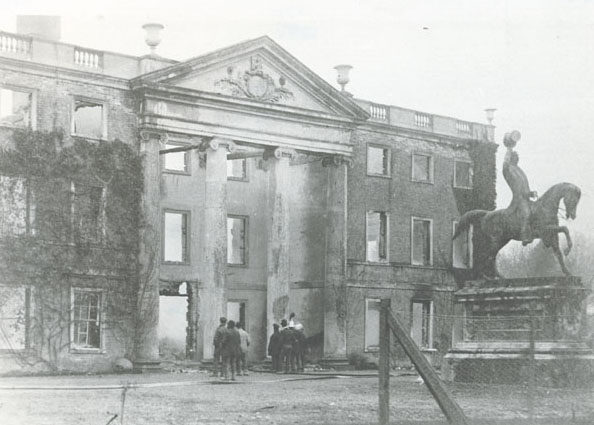
Olantigh House after the fire of 1903, with equestrian statue of John Erle-Drax

John Samuel Wanley Sawbridge Erle-Drax (born Sawbridge; 6 October 1800 – 5 January 1887) was a British Member of Parliament (MP) during the Victorian era.

== Personal life ==
Born John Sawbridge, he was the son of Samuel Elias Sawbridge, of Olantigh in Kent, and grandson of John Sawbridge, Lord Mayor of London in 1775. John married Jane Frances Erle-Drax-Grosvenor, daughter of Richard Erle-Drax-Grosvenor, in 1827. On 13 August 1828, his wife's brother Richard Erle-Drax-Grosvenor died unmarried, and he succeeded to her family estates, including Charborough House, assuming the surname of Erle-Drax.

He was a captain in the East Kent Militia, and raised a troop of the Dorsetshire Yeomanry in 1830 to deal with the Disturbances or Swing Riots of that year; he held the patronage of five church livings, and was a deputy-lieutenant of Dorset in the late 1850s.

Erle-Drax built his mausoleum, located beside Holnest church in the Blackmore Vale in Dorset, fifteen years before his death. He included in the Byzantine-style design a letter box, through which he arranged to have The Times delivered daily. He died on 5 January 1887, at which time the date was added to the epitaph. The mausoleum was demolished in 1935 and was replaced by a flat memorial stone.

== Parliament ==
After serving a term as High Sheriff of Dorset in 1840 Erle-Drax was the Conservative (Tory) Member of Parliament for Wareham for three periods between 1841 and 1880. Wareham was a pocket borough with just 342 electors, controlled jointly by Erle-Drax and John Hales Calcraft, who arranged for one or the other of them to be returned at each election. Immediately prior to the opening of the polls at one election, he made the following statement to the electors of Wareham: "I understand that some evil-disposed person has been circulating a report that I wish my tenants, and other persons dependent upon me, to vote according to their conscience. This is a dastardly lie, calculated to injure me. I have no wish of the sort. I wish, and intend, that these people should vote for me."

During his tenure in the House of Commons, Erle-Drax was known as the "Silent MP". He made only one known statement in the House, which was a request that the Speaker of the House have a window opened.

Erle-Drax's descendant, Richard Plunkett-Ernle-Erle-Drax, was elected as Member of Parliament for South Dorset in the 2010 United Kingdom general election using the 'truncated' name Richard Drax. During the 2010 United Kingdom general election campaign period, the Daily Mirror reported that Richard Drax's family had earned their fortune through slavery. Drax's response questioned his responsibility for "something that happened 300 or 400 years ago", stating "it's not what I stand for", and cited the desperation of his opponents- "all they can do is pick at bits of my family history". In 2013, the BBC noted that his ancestor John Erle-Drax, who had an estate in Barbados, was recorded in a database created by University College London as having received £4,293 12s 6d in compensation for 189 slaves when slavery was abolished.

== Wimbledon Common ==
Erle-Drax is reported to have been responsible for the destruction, in 1875, of the remains of an Iron Age fort on Wimbledon Common.

Parliament of the United Kingdom
Preceded by John Hales Calcraft	Member of Parliament for Wareham; 1841–1857	Succeeded by John Hales Calcraft
Preceded by John Hales Calcraft	Member of Parliament for Wareham; 1859–1865	Succeeded by John Calcraft
Preceded by John Calcraft	Member of Parliament for Wareham; 1868–1880	Succeeded by Montague Guest
