= John Cheverell =

Member of the Parliament of England

John Cheverell (before 1381 – after 1439), of Chilfrome, Chantmarle and Upper Sturthill, Dorset, was an English politician and lawyer.

His wife was Joan Chantmarle, daughter and coheiress of John Chantmarle of East Stoke and Chantmarle. They had one son, the MP, Walter Cheverell.

He was a Member (MP) of the Parliament of England for Wareham in 1406 and for Dorchester in 1407.
