= Granby Calcraft (British Army officer, born 1770) =

British soldier and politician

Major-General Sir Granby Calcraft
- Born: c. 1767
- Died: 20 August 1820; Bath, Somerset
- Education: Harrow School; Eton College
- Relatives: John Calcraft the Elder (father); John Calcraft the Younger (brother)
- Military career
- Allegiance: United Kingdom
- Branch: British Army
- Service years: 1788–1814
- Rank: Major-General
- Unit: 15th Light Dragoons
- Commands: 3rd Dragoon Guards; Heavy Cavalry Brigade
- Conflicts: French Revolutionary Wars; Flanders Campaign; Battle of Famars; Siege of Valenciennes; Battle of Villers-en-Cauchies; Siege of Dunkirk; Battle of Boxtel; Siege of Nijmegen; Anglo-Russian Invasion of Holland; Battle of Alkmaar (WIA); Napoleonic Wars; Peninsular War; Battle of Talavera; Battle of Campo Maior; Battle of Albuera; Battle of Usagre; Siege of Ciudad Rodrigo; Battle of Maguilla
- Awards: Army Gold Medal; Military Order of Maria Theresa (Austria); Military Order of the Tower and Sword (Portugal)

Member of Parliament for Wareham
- In office 1807–1808

Personal details
- Party: Whig

Major-General Sir Granby Thomas Calcraft (c. 1767 – 20 August 1820) was a British soldier and politician. He was a cavalry officer, and commanded the 3rd Dragoon Guards and the Heavy Brigade in the Peninsular War. He was MP for Wareham in the years 1807–1808.

== Early life ==
He was the younger son of John Calcraft of Rempston Hall in the Isle of Purbeck, and brother of John Calcraft the younger (1765–1831). Like his brother, he was illegitimate, the son of the actress Elizabeth Bride.

Calcraft entered the army as a cornet in the 15th Light Dragoons in March 1788, and was promoted lieutenant in 1793; in that year his regiment was ordered to join the force under the Duke of York and Albany in Flanders. With it he served at the Battle of Famars, the siege of Valenciennes, and the Battle of Villers-en-Cauchies, where a small force of the 15th Light Dragoons and Austrian hussars defeated a French corps. All the eight officers of the 15th present there were knighted, and received the Order of Maria Theresa from Leopold II, Holy Roman Emperor. In the same month, April 1794, Calcraft was promoted captain, and his regiment was frequently engaged throughout the disastrous retreat of the following winter.

In 1799 Calcraft accompanied Henry William Paget, who commanded the cavalry brigade in the Anglo-Russian invasion of Holland, as aide-de-camp; he was wounded at the Battle of Alkmaar on 1 October, and was for his services promoted major into the 25th Light Dragoons in December 1799. In the following year he exchanged into the 3rd Dragoon Guards, of which he became lieutenant-colonel on 25 December 1800, and he commanded the regiment until his promotion to the rank of major-general in 1813.

== Peninsular War ==
In 1807 Calcraft was elected Member of Parliament for Wareham, but resigned his seat at the close of 1808 on his regiment being ordered for service in the Iberian Peninsula. The 3rd Dragoon Guards were brigaded with the 4th Dragoons under the command of Henry Fane, as the Heavy Brigade, which was engaged in the Battle of Talavera. General Fane fell ill, and Calcraft assumed the command of the Brigade, which he held until the arrival of George de Grey in May 1810. The Brigade was frequently engaged during the retreat to Torres Vedras, and again in the pursuit of General André Masséna in March 1811. After the combat of Foz d'Aronce, the Heavy Brigade served on the left bank of the Tagus under Marshal Beresford.

Calcraft, who had been promoted colonel for his services on 25 July 1810, was engaged at the head of his regiment at the Battle of Campo Maior, at the Battle of Albuera, and in William Lumley's charge at Los Santos on 16 April 1811. In January 1812 the Heavy Brigade, which was again temporarily under the command of Calcraft, assisted in covering the siege of Ciudad Rodrigo, and when Wellington formed the Siege of Badajoz, it was left with General Graham's division to watch Auguste Marmont.

After the Battle of Salamanca the cavalry division was in the action at Llera on 11 June 1812, when General Charles Lallemand's cavalry was cut to pieces, and Calcraft was mentioned in General Slade's report. The Brigade was then engaged in covering Rowland Hill's retreat from Madrid, and in December 1812 Calcraft was made a knight of the Portuguese Order of the Tower and Sword for his services. On 4 June 1813 he was promoted major-general, and left the Peninsula theatre.

== Later life ==
The ministry disliked Calcraft's opinions, and his brother attacked it for "jobbery". In 1813 he was appointed to the command of a brigade in England, and in 1814 received a gold medal for the battle of Talavera. In 1814 he gave up his staff appointment, and lived in retirement, until his death on 20 August 1820.

== Notes ==
Attribution

This article incorporates text from a publication now in the public domain: Stephen, Leslie, ed. (1886). "Calcraft, Granby Thomas". Dictionary of National Biography. Vol. 8. London: Smith, Elder & Co.
