= Granby Hales Calcraft =

English politician (1802-1855)

Member of Parliament for Wareham
- In office 1831–1832
- Preceded by: John Calcraft; James Ewing
- Succeeded by: Charles Wood

Personal details
- Born: 18 January 1802 St George Hanover Square, London, England
- Died: 16 January 1855 (aged 52) New York, United States
- Party: Whig
- Spouse: Sarah Emma Love (m. 1828; sep. 1830)
- Parent: John Calcraft (father)
- Relatives: John Hales Calcraft (brother)
- Education: Christ Church, Oxford

Granby Hales Calcraft (18 January 1802 – 16 January 1855) was a Whig member of parliament for the constituency of Wareham (1831-1832) and a captain in the army (1824-1833).

== Biography ==
Calcraft was born in St George Hanover Square, London, the son of John Calcraft of Rempstone, Dorset, and Elizabeth Hales, daughter of Sir Thomas Pym Hales. He was educated at Christ Church, Oxford University. While at Oxford, it was reported of him by John Stuart Wortley that, ‘little Calcraft has been great fun lately'. Like his father and grandfather before him, Calcraft seemed to have had a passion for the theatre.

He purchased a commission to the army in 1824 and was made an unattached captain in 1826. Having been elected to Brooks's on the 21st of February 1825, it may have been he and not his brother, John, who carried to Lord Lansdowne a message from the Whig meeting at the club in April 1827 urging him not to break off negotiations for joining the Canning administration. However, it is possible he was out of the country at that time, as he certainly served abroad for a while with his regiment.

On his return in 1828, Calcraft became enamoured of Sarah Emma Love (1798-1881), a contralto opera singer and actress who had joined the company at Drury Lane theatre from Covent Garden and was known for her role in Cobb’s comic opera, The Siege of Belgrade. On 10th November 1828, they married at St. Pancras church. The marriage was kept secret from his father, who he thought would disapprove, and also from her mother for a brief period of time. Calcraft's father had provided him with an allowance of £1,000 on the condition not to marry beneath his station. Emma, of low birth, learned of this imminent poverty from Stephen Price, manager at Drury Lane, after the marriage and urged Calcraft to keep their situation a secret. Emma refused to cohabit for fear of losing her theatre contract and sending both Calcraft and herself into the "horrors of poverty" as "neither of them [was] so constituted as to be able to endure" such a turn of events. Within months of the marriage Robert Sherard, 6th Earl of Harborough, had renewed a former interest in her, they had been romantically involved since 1824, even as Calcraft sought her assurance that she would join him. The husband and usurper did confront each other, whereupon Calcraft was said to have demanded satisfaction, but in July 1829 Emma eloped with Sherard while on tour in Nottingham and went to live in a cottage on his estate at Stapleford Park in Leicestershire. In February 1830, Calcraft was granted a formal separation from her, and afterward brought a bill of divorce in the House of Lords. In the course of evidence, a servant stated that Emma had been, "afraid, or appeared to me to be afraid, Lord Harborough was seeking her, notwithstanding he knew she was married; that he was seeking to possess her; and she said she would rather sweep the Corners of the Streets than be his Mistress, if that was his Object." The bill fell away following the dissolution of parliament, owing to Calcraft's inability to bear the expense as a result of losing his allowance, as he later claimed, and the marriage remained valid in law. All three of Emma Love and Robert Sherard's illegitimate children were given the legal last name Calcraft prior to taking on the surname 'Kennedy'.

=== Role in Parliament ===
Calcraft was elected to the family constituency of Wareham in the 1831 general election, won by the Whig Party. The seat had previously been held by his father and by his older brother, John Hales Calcraft.

He voted for the second reading of the Grey ministry’s reintroduced reform bill. He presented the petition from Wareham for its retaining one seat, but the following day he conceded that, although the borough was prosperous and almost viable in terms of population, it could not be saved from some degree of disenfranchisement under schedule A. He voted for swearing the original Dublin election committee. He divided for the passage of the reform bill and Lord Ebrington’s confidence motion. He voted for the second reading of the revised bill, to go into committee on it. He divided against the second reading of Hobhouse’s vestry bill. He voted for Ebrington’s motion for an address calling on King William IV to appoint only ministers who would carry the reform bill unimpaired and the second reading of the Irish reform bill. He divided in the minority for Buxton’s motion for a select committee on colonial slavery, and spoke and voted to abolish flogging in the army. Arriving late at the debate on adding Corfe Castle to the reprieved constituency of Wareham, he opposed the idea because it would give the nomination to the Bankes family, local Tory rivals. His only other known votes were with government for the Russian-Dutch loan.

His older brother, with whom he differed in politics, had succeeded to the family estates after their father’s suicide in September 1831 and intended the remaining seat at Wareham for himself. In an address of 18 June 1832 Calcraft therefore declined to come forward as a Liberal at the impending general election because of his ‘apprehension of a painful family collision’. He left the House at the dissolution later that year and never sat again.

After living at a succession of London addresses, Calcraft was held to be insolvent In 1839, but successfully petitioned for release from the Fleet prison late that year. Little more is known of him until he turned up in the United States in 1847, with an appointment in New York as the British Government packet agent, procured through the influence of the marquess of Clanricarde. He seems to have moved in theatrical circles and was well known in the city. In January 1852, he testified in the notorious divorce case of Edwin and Catharine Forrest, in which he twice declined to answer character questions in cross-examination regarding the identity of his wife and that of an ex-actress, Mrs Robinson, whom it was insinuated he had visited in uptown Manhattan one evening after leaving the Forrest house. The circumstances attracted great public interest, but the charge that Mrs Forrest had committed adultery with Calcraft was withdrawn from the jury.

In January 1855, Calcraft died in New York and was buried in Greenwood cemetery.
