= John Hales Calcraft =

British Member of Parliament (1796–1880)

Member of Parliament for Wareham
- In office 28 March 1857 – 29 April 1859
- Preceded by: John Erle-Drax
- Succeeded by: John Erle-Drax
- In office 12 December 1832 – 30 June 1841
- Preceded by: Granby Calcraft; Charles Wood
- Succeeded by: John Erle-Drax
- In office 7 March 1820 – 9 June 1826 Serving with John Calcraft
- Preceded by: John Calcraft; Thomas Denman
- Succeeded by: John Calcraft; Charles Baring Wall

Personal details
- Born: 23 September 1796 Rempstone Hall, Purbeck, Dorset
- Died: 13 March 1880 (aged 83) St George Hanover Square, London
- Party: Whig
- Other political affiliations: Conservative/Tory (before 1857)
- Spouse: Lady Caroline Katherine Montagu (m. 1828)
- Children: Seven
- Parent(s): John Calcraft; Elizabeth Hales
- Relatives: Granby Calcraft
- Education: Christ Church, Oxford; Eton College

John Hales Calcraft (23 September 1796 – 13 March 1880) was a British Whig, Conservative and Tory politician.

== Family ==
Born at Rempstone Hall in Purbeck, Dorset, Calcraft was the son of John Calcraft and Elizabeth née Hales (daughter of Sir Thomas Hales, and the brother of Granby Calcraft. He married Lady Caroline Katherine Montagu, daughter of William Montagu and Lady Susan Gordon, in 1828, and they had three sons and four daughters, including: John Hales Montagu (1831–1868); Susan Charlotte (1833–1892); William Montagu (1834–1901); Henry George (1836–1896); and Georgiana Emily (died 1915). Upon his marriage, his father granted him an allowance of £1,000 a year and allowed him to reside at Rempstone.

== Political career ==
Elected to gentleman's club Brooks's in 1817, Calcraft was brought into Parliament for the first time at his father's borough of Wareham. Sitting as a Tory alongside his father (who was a Whig), he was described by Sir James Mackintosh as a "very sensible young man" and held the seat until 1826, although he often divided with the Whigs. However, his early parliamentary career was somewhat inactive with illness affecting his ability to vote on several occasions. Despite this, he voted against William Wilberforce's compromise motion on the Queen Caroline affair in 1820, for parliamentary reform in 1822, against the Irish unlawful societies bill in 1825, and for alteration for the corn laws in 1825. He had just one intervention during this period of his career, presenting a petition of the journeymen fishmongers of Westminster, who wanted to sell fish after 10:00. Falling ill again in early 1826, he retired from the seat.

In 1828, he became deputy Postmaster General of the United Kingdom to his father, and then began to take part in local affairs, chairing the anniversary meeting of the Wareham Church Missionary Society in August of the same year. While he did not stand for election at Wareham again in 1830 or 1831, his brother Granby was elected a Whig MP for the seat in the later year.

Following his father's suicide in late 1831, Calcraft returned to parliament in the same seat in 1832 as an "anti-reformer" and, becoming a Conservative in 1834, held the seat until 1841 when he was defeated. He once more returned to the seat, this time as a Whig, in 1857, and held the seat until the next general election in 1859 when he did not seek re-election.

== Later life ==
After leaving parliament, Calcraft became High Sheriff of Dorset from 1867 to 1868, with his eldest son John Hales Montagu serving as Liberal MP for Wareham from 1865 to 1868, and his third son, Henry George, becoming permanent secretary to the Board of Trade from 1886 to 1893.

Calcraft died in 1880 at St George Hanover Square, London, and was noted by The Times as a "fine example of the country gentleman and the squire", while the writer Jane Ellen Panton in 1909 said he was "one of the most magnificent old men that I have ever seen". His estate was inherited by his eldest surviving son, William Montagu.

Parliament of the United Kingdom
Preceded by John Erle-Drax	Member of Parliament for Wareham; 1857–1859	Succeeded by John Erle-Drax
Preceded by Granby Calcraft; Charles Wood	Member of Parliament for Wareham; 1832–1841	Succeeded by John Erle-Drax
Preceded by John Calcraft; Thomas Denman	Member of Parliament for Wareham; 1820–1826; With: John Calcraft	Succeeded by John Calcraft; Charles Baring Wall
