= John Calcraft (the younger) =

British landowner and politician (1765–1831)

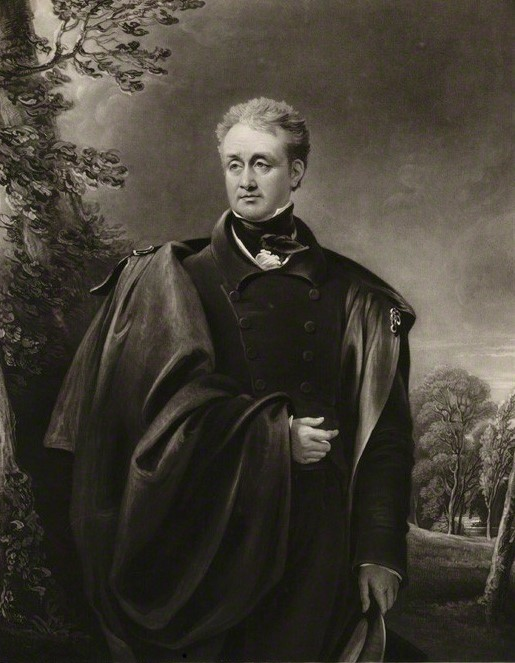
John Calcraft the Younger

John Calcraft the Younger (16 October 1765 – 11 September 1831), of Rempstone in Dorset and Ingress in Kent, was an English landowner and Member of Parliament.

The illegitimate son and principal heir of John Calcraft the Elder, a politician who had made a fortune as an army contractor, Calcraft inherited his father's estates while still a child. The property included control of the pocket borough of Wareham in Dorset, and while still three months short of coming of age he was returned as its Member of Parliament (MP) in 1786. He is not recorded as having spoken in the House during his first Parliament, and did not stand for re-election in 1790, but subsequently re-entered the House, representing Wareham again (1800–1806 and 1818–1831), Rochester (1806–1818) and Dorset (1831).

From 1800 until 1828, Calcraft was a Whig, and served briefly as a clerk of the ordnance (1806–1807) when the party held power under Lord Grenville. However, in 1828 he accepted office as Paymaster of the Forces in the Duke of Wellington's Tory administration, and was raised to the Privy Council; but he broke with the Tories over parliamentary reform and returned to the Whigs in March 1831, voting for the Reform Bill in the crucial division on the second reading when it passed by a single vote. He was elected as a reformer for the county in the election that followed shortly afterwards, but becoming convinced that both sides in the Commons despised him he became mentally unstable, and later the same year he committed suicide.

Calcraft married Elizabeth Hales, daughter of Sir Thomas Pym Hales, in 1790, and they had five surviving children. His two sons, John Hales Calcraft and Granby Calcraft, both became MPs for Wareham.

Parliament of Great Britain
Preceded by Thomas Farrer; Charles Lefebure	Member of Parliament for Wareham; 1786–1790; With: Thomas Farrer	Succeeded by Richard Smith; Lord Robert Spencer
Preceded by Sir Godfrey Vassall; Joseph Chaplin Hankey	Member of Parliament for Wareham; 1800–1801; With: Joseph Chaplin Hankey	Succeeded by Parliament of the United Kingdom
Parliament of the United Kingdom
Preceded by Parliament of Great Britain	Member of Parliament for Wareham; 1801–1806; With: Joseph Chaplin Hankey 1801–1802; Andrew Strahan 1802–1806	Succeeded by Andrew Strahan; Jonathan Raine
Preceded by Captain Sir Sidney Smith; James Hulkes	Member of Parliament for Rochester; 1806–1818; With: James Barnett 1806–1807; Sir Thomas Boulden Thompson 1807–1816; James Barnett 1816–1818	Succeeded by James Barnett; Lord Binning
Preceded by Robert Gordon; Theodore Henry Broadhead	Member of Parliament for Wareham; 1818–1831; With: Thomas Denman 1818–1820; John Hales Calcraft 1820–1826; Charles Baring Wall 1826–1830; James Ewing 1830–1831	Succeeded by Granby Hales Calcraft; Charles Wood
Preceded by Edward Portman; Henry Bankes	Member of Parliament for Dorset; 1831; With: Edward Portman	Succeeded by Edward Portman; Lord Ashley
Political offices
Preceded by Hon. William Wellesley-Pole	Clerk of the Ordnance; 1806–1807	Succeeded by Hon. William Wellesley-Pole
Preceded by Hon. William Vesey-FitzGerald	Paymaster of the Forces; 1828–1830	Succeeded by Lord John Russell
