= Theodore Henry Broadhead =

English army officer and politician

Theodore Henry Broadhead (3 December 1767 – 12 December 1820) was an English army officer and politician.

== Life ==
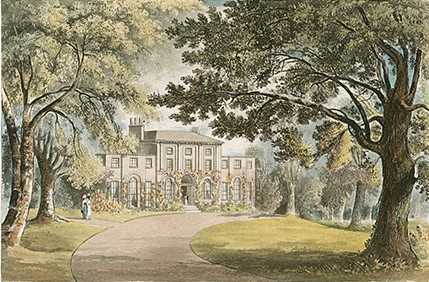
Holly Grove House, residence of Theodore Henry Broadhead in Windsor

The son of Theodore Henry Broadhead the elder, whose original surname was Brinckman, and his wife Mary Bingley, he was educated at Eton College, and matriculated at Emmanuel College, Cambridge in 1784, graduating in B.A. 1788, and M.A.in 1791. He became a cornet in the 1st Life Guards in 1790, and continued in a number of militia posts. From 1807 he lived in Windsor. His residence, "Holly Grove", had been designed by Thomas Sandby. It was later known as "Forest Lodge", and was absorbed into Windsor Great Park.

Broadhead entered politics as Member of Parliament for Wareham in 1812, holding the seat until 1818. He is not known to have contributed to debates. He returned as M.P. for Yarmouth, Isle of Wight in 1820, the year of his death.

== Family ==
The Brinckmans were from Hanover, and Theodore Brinckman who moved to Great Britain in the time of George I was grandfather to Theodore Henry Broadhead the elder (1714–1810). The family became landowners in Yorkshire when John Richard Brinckman, father of Theodore Henry the elder, married Anne Bingley, heiress to the Broadhead and Bingley estates.

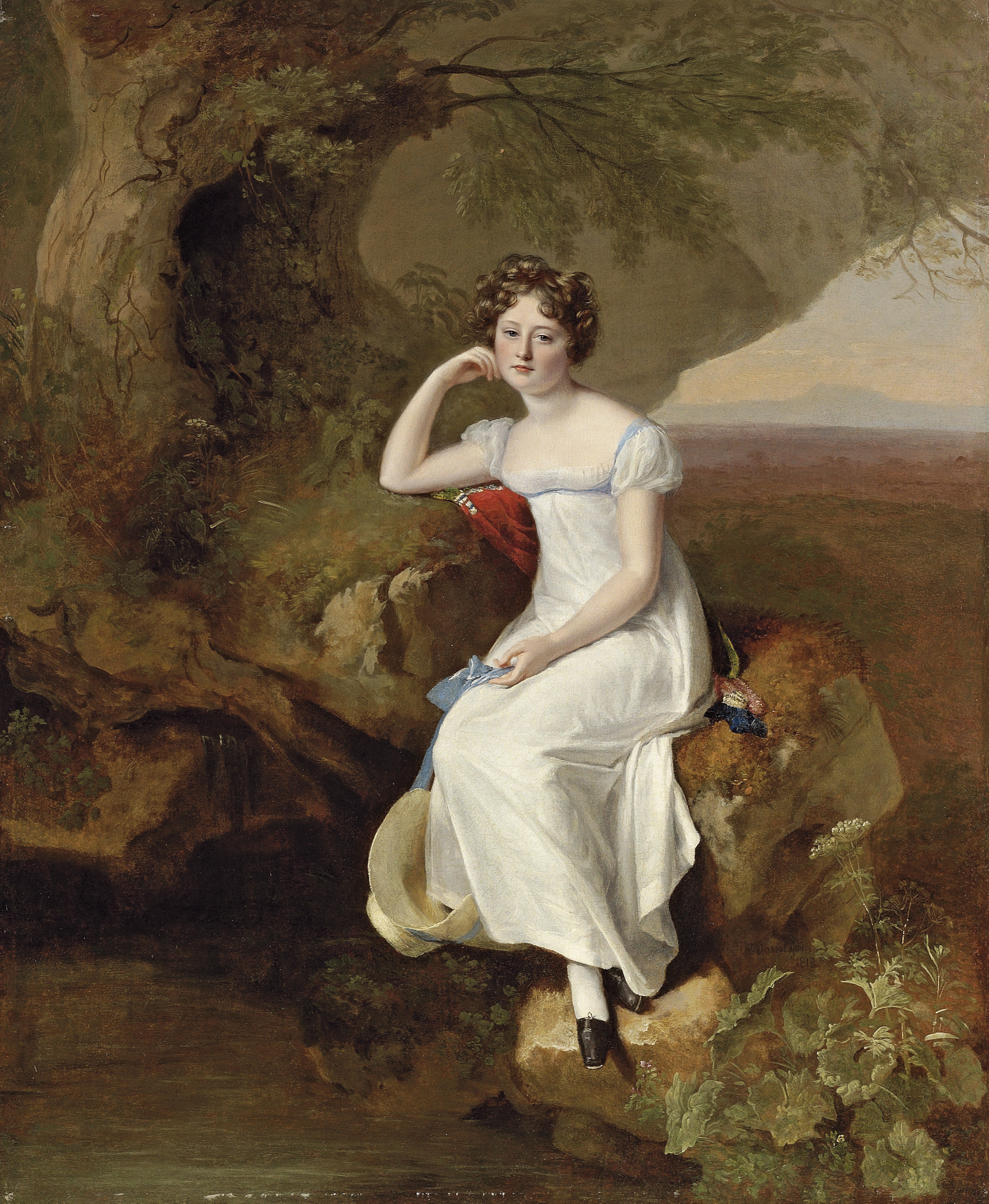
Elizabeth Broadhead, 1818 portrait

Broadhead married in 1797 Elizabeth Macdougall, daughter of William Gordon Macdougall of St. George's Hanover Square; they had eight sons and four daughters. Macdougall is also given as from Saint Croix. The witnesses were W. P. Georges, Junior, i.e. William Payne Georges II, Frances Lavington, i.e. the wife of Ralph Payne, 1st Baron Lavington, and John Dashwood King, i.e. Sir John Dashwood-King, 4th Baronet.

The eight sons were:

- Theodore Henry Lavington
- John Richard (born 1798), of the 60th Rifles
- Brinckman (born 1800), of the Coldstream Guards
- William Augustus (born 1802), of the 7th Hussars, married in 1828 Louisa Augusta Paget, daughter of Sir Charles Paget
- Bingley (1803–1851), of the 80th Foot
- Henry R.N. (born 1806), commanded HMS Lynx (1833) active against the African slave trade.
- George, cleric (1807–1870), rector of West Wycombe from 1845
- Alfred (1808–1857), entered Lincoln's Inn in 1831

In 1842 the first three brothers were able to change surname to Brinckman, by royal license.

The four daughters were:

- Elizabeth, married in 1823 George Henry Dashwood, a first cousin marriage
- Mary
- Fanny
- Charlotte (died 1855), married in 1845 as his third wife John William Fane
