= John Calcraft =

British politician (1726–1772)

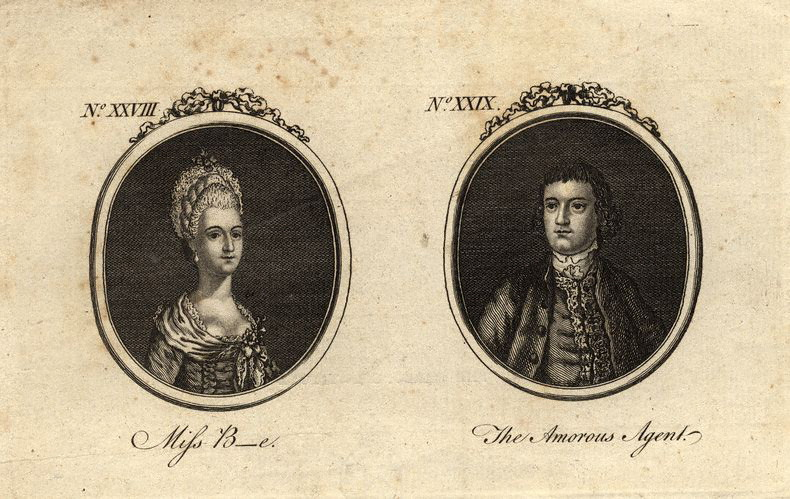
Double portrait of John Calcraft and Elizabeth Bride, with whom he had a longstanding affair.

John Calcraft the Elder (1726 – 23 August 1772), of Rempstone in Dorset and Ingress in Kent, was an English army agent and politician.

== Business career ==
The son of an attorney who was Town Clerk of Grantham, Calcraft set out on a career as an army contractor under the patronage of Grantham's Member of Parliament (MP), the Marquess of Granby, at this period a rising army officer, and of one of the Whig leaders in Parliament, Henry Fox, to whom he was apparently related. (The nature of the relationship was never made clear, and insinuations were made that he was Fox's natural son.) Calcraft was deputy paymaster of the Duke of Cumberland's army at the time of the Jacobite rising of 1745, and subsequently a clerk in the War Office (1747–56), paymaster of widow's pensions (1757–62) and deputy-commissary of musters (1756–63). All of these posts offered lucrative opportunities for enrichment, both legitimate and less so. As well as the functions directly arising from the offices he held, he was involved with the rebuilding of Horse Guards, held contracts for delivering coal to Gibraltar, and became agent to many regiments of the army, a role with both administrative and financial responsibilities and offering considerable opportunity for profit if ably handled. By 1761, he was acting for no less than 49 colonels. Calcraft amassed a considerable fortune.

== Political career ==
In 1757 Calcraft purchased an estate at Rempstone on the Isle of Purbeck in Dorset, which gave him an interest in three nearby parliamentary boroughs, Corfe Castle, Poole and Wareham. He quickly set out to buy further property which would increase his influence in each borough: he was unsuccessful at Corfe Castle, but acquired sufficient sway at Poole to secure the election of his brother, Thomas Calcraft, in 1761 and 1768, and became landlord to enough of the voters to gain complete control of Wareham, which remained a Calcraft pocket borough until the Reform Act. In 1760 he bought a further estate, at Ingress near Dartford in Kent.

Calcraft was by now one of the most influential behind-the-scenes figures in British politics, working hand-in-glove with Fox, and was particularly deeply involved in the discussions to construct a government following the fall of Bute in 1763. But at this point he fell out with Fox, who he believed should give up the Pay Office, and became more closely associated with Shelburne and Pitt, and there was talk that he would be offered an Irish peerage. However, he lost his office as deputy-commissary of musters when the Shelburne group joined the opposition at the end of 1763, and the vindictive Fox considered attempting to have him dismissed also from some of his regimental agencies; but in any case, he soon after retired from the agency business and turned his attention to finding a seat in Parliament. In 1765 he acquired Leeds Abbey in Kent and made considerable improvements and additions to the house and its grounds. On his death on 1772, he devised it with the rest of his estates, to his eldest son, John Calcroft.

A vacancy arose at Rochester in November 1765, and Calcraft stood on the independent interest but was narrowly defeated by the government candidate; Rochester was generally considered to be a safe government borough, and a less wealthy candidate would have had no chance. In April the following year, however, he was returned as member for Calne, one of Shelburne's boroughs, and supported the Chatham ministry in the House. At the end of the Parliament he secured government support for his second candidacy at Rochester, where he was duly elected. Nevertheless, after Chatham's resignation he consistently spoke and voted with the Opposition. He was also an enthusiastic supporter of Parliamentary Reform. He died in 1772.

== Family life ==
Calcraft married a woman named Bridget in 1744, but they soon separated and he seems to have been able to conceal her existence, for in 1762 there was speculation about his intentions to marry a Miss Wriothesley; nevertheless, she survived him and made a successful claim against his estate after his death. They had no children, but he had illegitimate children with at least two other women, Mrs George Anne Bellamy and Mrs Elizabeth Bride, both actresses. He made John Calcraft (the younger), his eldest son by Mrs Bride, his main heir. The younger Calcraft followed his father into Parliament, initially as member for Wareham. His brother Thomas Calcraft was MP for Poole.

Parliament of Great Britain
Preceded by Thomas FitzMaurice; Thomas Duckett	Member of Parliament for Calne; 1766–1768; With: Thomas FitzMaurice	Succeeded by Thomas FitzMaurice; John Dunning
Preceded by Admiral Sir Charles Hardy; Grey Cooper	Member of Parliament for Rochester; 1768–1772; With: William Gordon 1768–1771; Admiral Thomas Pye 1771–1772	Succeeded by Admiral Thomas Pye; George Finch-Hatton
