= Edward Henry Cooper =

Irish officer, landlord and Conservative politician

A mid-19th-century sketch of Markree Castle, Edward Henry Cooper's estate in County Sligo

Lieutenant-Colonel Edward Henry Cooper PC (Ire) (1827 – 26 February 1902) was an Irish officer in the British Army, a landlord in County Sligo, and a Conservative politician.

At the age of 36 the Dublin-born soldier inherited Markree Castle in County Sligo from his uncle, and left the army to manage his country estate. As one of the major landlords in the county, he assumed many of the roles which still accompanied that status. He promptly became a local magistrate, and in 1865 was returned unopposed by the county to the House of Commons of the United Kingdom.

Having followed five previous Cooper landlords of Markree to serve as Member of Parliament (MP) for Sligo, his unpopularity as a landlord led to his defeat in 1868, after one term. He then reactivated his uncle's Markree Observatory, and commissioned archaeological drawings of County Sligo. He served as the Lord Lieutenant of Sligo for the 25 years until his death, and for the last three as a Privy Councillor.

== Early life ==
Cooper was the oldest of seven children of Richard Wordsworth Cooper (1801–1850) of Longford Lodge in Kingstown (now Dún Laoghaire), County Dublin; their home later became Glengara Park School. His father was the third-born (and second surviving) son of Edward Synge Cooper MP of Markree Castle in County Sligo. His mother was Emilia Eleanor, daughter of the 1st Viscount Frankfort de Montmorency.

Cooper was educated at Eton, before joining the British Army in 1845.

== Army ==
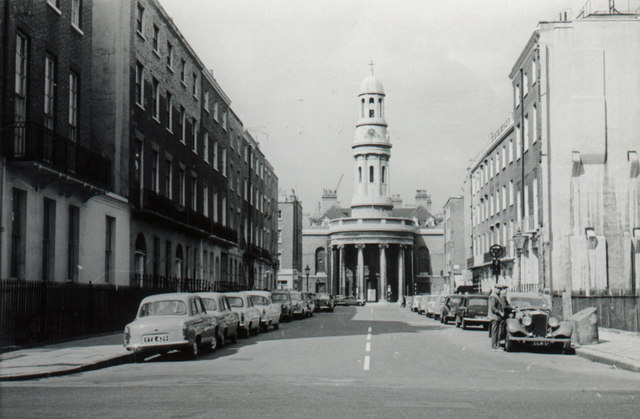
St Mary's church at Bryanston Square, London, where Cooper was married in 1863. (Pictured in the 1960s)

In May 1845, the 18-year-old Cooper purchased an army commission as a cornet in the 7th Light Dragoons. He was promoted in 1846 to lieutenant, and bought a further promotion to captain in 1848. He transferred in 1851 to the 72nd Foot, then in 1852 to the Grenadier Guards.

In 1857 Cooper purchased a promotion to lieutenant colonel of the Grenadier Guards, and on 9 August 1858, he married Charlotte Maria Mills at the church of St Mary's, Bryanston Square in London. His uncle Edward Joshua Cooper had died in April 1863. Having five daughters but no sons, Edward Joshua had bequeathed Markree Castle to Edward Henry, who retired from the army in July 1863.

== Parliament ==
Having inherited a 30,000 acres (12,000 ha; 47 sq mi) estate, Cooper was appointed as a magistrate in August 1863. At the 1865 general election he was nominated as a Conservative candidate for County Sligo. The county had two Conservative MPs, and the more-recently elected was Charles William O'Hara, who had been popular with all parties. O'Hara stood down due to ill-health, and Cooper was returned unopposed along with the sitting Conservative MP Sir Robert Gore-Booth, 4th Bt.

As an MP for the county, Edward Henry was the last of six Cooper landlords of Markree to hold the seat. His predecessors had been MPs for County Sligo for all but 23 of the years 1719 to 1841. In the 18th century Joshua Cooper and his son Joshua II had sat for County Sligo in the pre-union Irish House of Commons. The second Joshua's oldest son was Joshua Edward Cooper, who had held the seat at the time of the Act of Union in 1800, and sat for the county at Westminster until 1806. The seat was then held by his younger brother Edward Synge Cooper (grandfather of Edward Henry) until 1830, when he retired in favour of his son Edward Joshua Cooper, who sat until 1841.

=== 1868 election ===
The Liberals had rarely contested County Sligo, and had not fielded a candidate since the defeat in 1857 of their only winner, the one-term MP Richard Swift. Apart from Swift, Sligo's two seats had been held continuously by Conservatives, usually drawn from the county's major landlords.

There had been Liberal moves to contest the 1865 election, and the Freeman's Journal had confidently predicted that it would happen, but no contest took place. However, at the 1868 general election, the Liberals decided to contest the seat. On 9 July, the Catholic Bishop of Elphin Dr Laurence Gillooly (whose diocese includes part of County Sligo) chaired a meeting which adopted Denis Maurice O'Conor as the Liberal candidate. The second son of the O'Conor Don, O'Conor was a barrister educated at Downside and the University of London, and had been High Sheriff of Roscommon in 1865. His older brother Charles had been an MP for the neighbouring County Roscommon since 1860.

On the same day, Owen Wynne of Hazelwood chaired a meeting of the County Registration Society to organise the campaign for the re-election of Cooper and Gore Booth. With three candidates for the two seats, County Sligo had its first contested election in over a decade. Gore-Booth, the owner of Lissadell House in the north of the county, had been a Sligo MP since 1850 and his return was considered almost certain. The Liberal target was Cooper, making the election effectively a two-way race between him and O'Connor, who had been canvassing since at least August.

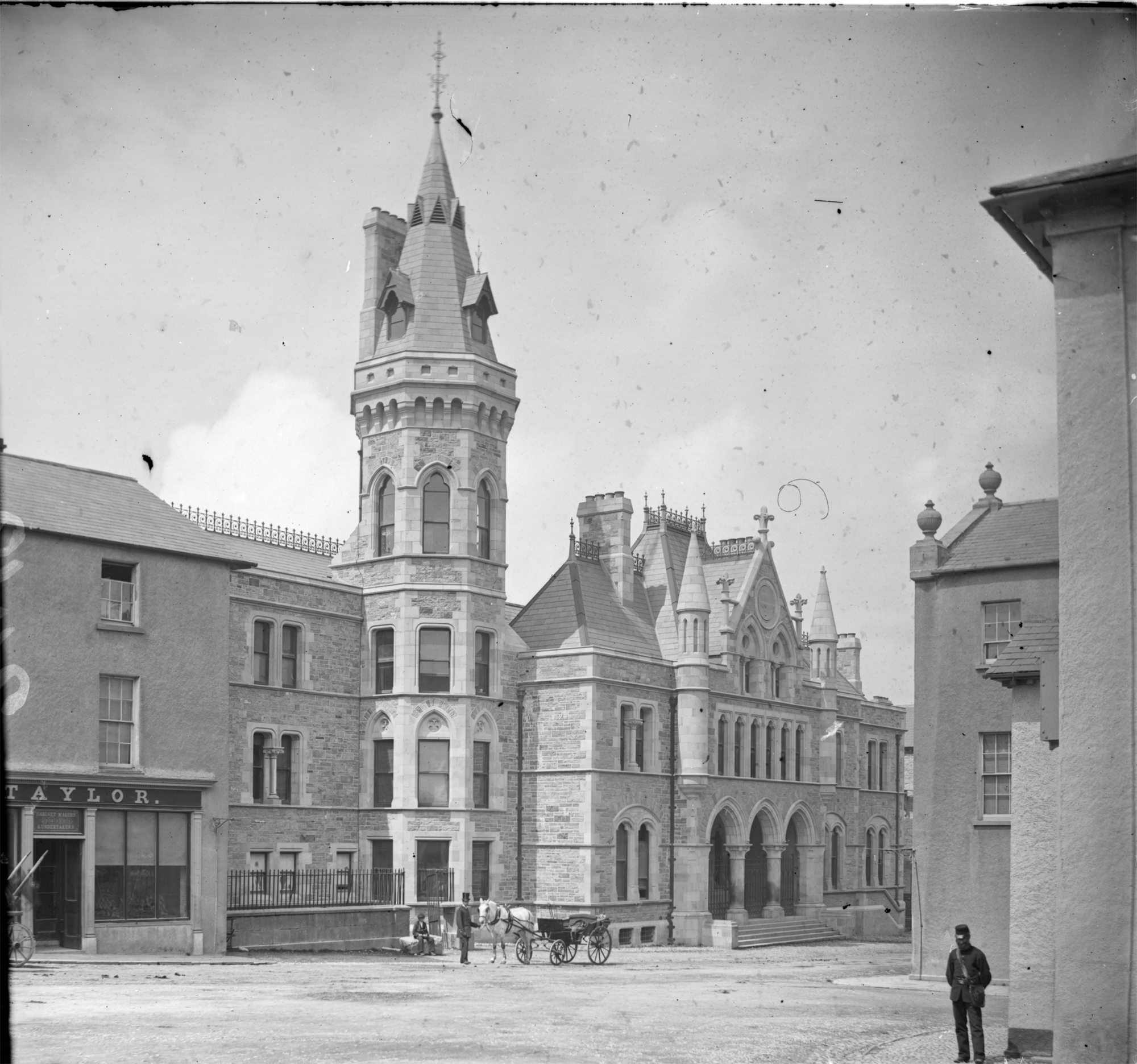
The courthouse in Sligo, pictured in about 1888, where the nominations were held for the 1868 elections for County Sligo

The nomination took place at the courthouse in Sligo on 26 November, when both O'Connor and Gore-Booth were given a hearing, but Cooper's address was delivered in what The Times of London described as "great uproar". After explaining that unpopular conditions which he had sought to impose on his tenants had been withdrawn when they met objections, he was forced to abandon his speech.

Cooper had been nominated by his predecessor Charles William O'Hara, who had been heard respectfully. However, his seconder Wynne was denied a hearing. Hecklers had told O'Hara that he would have been a popular candidate, and when O'Hara asked why Cooper was unpopular the reply was "he's a Tory".

The Rev J. Conway, a parish priest who seconded O'Conor's nomination, said that sitting MPs were being opposed because they "systematically opposed the wishes of the majority of their constituents". He said that the Conservatives were elected as result of coercion by the landlords rather than by the fair votes of the people. A show of hands favoured Gore-Booth and O'Connor, but Cooper demanded a vote, making County Sligo the last constituency in Ireland to complete its election.

After the violence which accompanied the election in Sligo Borough two weeks beforehand, The Times of London reported that "the passions of the peasantry have been inflamed by incessant appeals, and a bitter feeling of hostility against the landlords has been aroused". The Freeman's Journal reported a different picture, asserting that "a reign of landlord terrorism appears to have been inaugurated in the county". It noted that the plan to flood the county with military "to protect Catholic voters" did not have happy precedents, citing the Dungarvan massacre during the December 1866 by-election when lancers charged a crowd, killing one person and injuring 19.

The deployment proceeded: 300 men were added to the local police force, and the British Army arrived. General Arthur Borton commanded detachments of infantry (the 17th Foot) and cavalry (the Carabiniers) who were distributed around the county.

The county poll was largely free of the public violence which marred the election in Sligo Borough two weeks beforehand, although one man was reported to have had his finger shot off at a voting station. Priests had stood at polling places instructing Catholics to vote Liberal, while the landlords brought in their tenants under close supervision. O'Hara claimed that isolated houses had been visited at night by mobs, and their occupants forced to swear not to vote for the landlords. O'Connor contended that the issue at stake was of freedom of election versus what he called the "monstrous doctrine" that votes belonged to the landlord. He said that he did not support any acts of violence, but that it was unsurprising that people had sought to counter one injustice with another injustice.

Polling took place over 3 days, and was completed on 2 December. O'Connor had topped the poll with 1671 votes, Gore-Booth had 1208 votes, and Cooper with 1129 votes lost his seat. A fourth candidate, Cornelius Keogh, had put himself forward at the hustings as a Liberal, but received only 2 votes.

Two petitions were lodged against the result. A petition claiming that Cooper should be seated in the place of O'Conor was lodged by Henry Griffith, a deputy lieutenant of Sligo. Griffith alleged that O'Conor had benefited from bribery, intimidation, and many forms of corruption. Another petition, signed by John Hannon and James Casey, asked that the return of Gore Booth be voided on grounds of bribery, treating and intimidation.

Cooper's defeat marked the beginning of the end of County Sligo's representation by Conservative landlords. The introduction of the secret ballot in the 1872 Act ended landlord's control over their tenants' votes, and at the 1874 general election O'Connor was returned as a Home Rule League candidate alongside Gore-Booth, without a contest. On Gore-Booth's death in 1877, the Home Ruler Edward King-Harman was returned unopposed in his place, and the county never again elected a Conservative MP.

== After Parliament ==
Cooper's uncle Edward Joshua had built on his lands Markree Observatory, an astronomical facility whose telescope contained what was then the largest lens in the world. After his death, the observatory was left unsupervised until 1874, when William Doberck was hired as its director.

The observatory was uncovered, and after 43 years of exposure to the Irish weather, the large refractor had corroded badly. Doberck supervised its restoration, and used it mainly for observing double stars. In 1883 Doberck left to become government astronomer in Hong Kong, and was succeeded by Albert Marth, a controversial astronomer whose salary of £200 per annum plus accommodation required him only to make meteorological observations. On Marth's death in 1897 he was replaced by Frederick William Henckel, who ran the observatory until Cooper's death in 1902.

In the 1876, Cooper commissioned the archaeologist William Frederick Wakeman to produce a series of drawings of the archaeology of County Sligo. The illustrations were produced between 1886 and 1882, and enhanced with watercolours. They were published as bound folio editions in 1893: the 140-sheet "Drawings of the Antiquities of County Sligo", and the 80-sheet "Drawings from the Island of Inishmurray". The originals were donated to Sligo County Library in the 1950s by Cooper's grandson Edward Francis Cooper.

Cooper was High Sheriff of County Sligo in 1871. Almost a decade after losing his parliamentary seat, he was appointed by Queen Victoria to the by-then largely ceremonial roles of Lord Lieutenant of Sligo and Custos Rotulorum of Sligo, which he held until his death. In 1899 he was sworn as a member of the Privy Council of Ireland.

== Death ==
After a long illness, Cooper died on 26 February 1902, aged about 75, at his London residence 42 Portman Square. His wife had died 4 weeks beforehand.

His oldest son Major Francis E. Cooper had died of typhoid in South Africa in 1900, and Markree was inherited by Francis's oldest son Bryan Ricco Cooper. Bryan, who then only 17 years old, was briefly a Unionist MP for South Dublin in 1910, and in the 1920s became one of the few former Westminster MPs to be elected to Dáil Éireann. He sold most of the estate's 30,000 acres and closed the observatory, sending the lens to Hong Kong Observatory (where Doberck was government astronomer).

Parliament of the United Kingdom
Preceded by Sir Robert Gore-Booth, Bt; Charles William Cooper	Member of Parliament for County Sligo; 1865 – 1868; With: Sir Robert Gore-Booth, Bt	Succeeded by Sir Robert Gore-Booth, Bt; Denis Maurice O'Conor
Honorary titles
Preceded by Sir Robert Gore-Booth, Bt	Lord Lieutenant of Sligo; 1877–1902	Succeeded by Charles Kean O'Hara
