= High Sheriff of Sligo =

British judicial representative in County Sligo, Ireland

The High Sheriff of Sligo was the British Crown's judicial representative in County Sligo, Ireland, from the 16th century until 1922, when the office was abolished in the new Free State and replaced by the office of Sligo County Sheriff. The sheriff had judicial, electoral, ceremonial and administrative functions and executed High Court Writs. In 1908, an Order in Council made the Lord-Lieutenant the Sovereign's prime representative in a county and reduced the High Sheriff's precedence. However the sheriff retained his responsibilities for the preservation of law and order in the county. The usual procedure for appointing the sheriff from 1660 onwards was that three persons were nominated at the beginning of each year from the county and the Lord Lieutenant then appointed his choice as High Sheriff for the remainder of the year. Often the other nominees were appointed as under-sheriffs. Sometimes a sheriff did not fulfil his entire term through death or other event and another sheriff was then appointed for the remainder of the year. The dates given hereunder are the dates of appointment. All addresses are in County Sligo unless stated otherwise.

Sligo was constituted a county in 1568 by Sir Henry Sidney, Lord Deputy of Ireland, but a sheriff does not appear to have been appointed until the year 1576 at the request of the O'Connor Sligo.

== High Sheriffs of County Sligo ==
- Source: History of Sligo
- 157n: Richard Mac Swine
- 15nn: Thaddeus O'Hara
- 15nn: Brian O'Rourke
- 15nn: William Bourke
- 15nn: George Goodman
- 15nn: George Bingham
- 15nn: Richard Oge Bourke
- 15nn: William Tathe
- 15nn: James Crean
- 15nn: Thomas Nolan
- 15nn: Thomas Wood of Ballymote Castle
- 15nn: Henry Bingham
- 1588: Sir William Taafe
- 1602: Sir Roger Jones
- 1603: Teige O'Hara Boy
- 1604: William Taafe
- 1606: William Crofton
- 1608: Teige O'Hara Boy
- 1609: Josias Lambert
- 1610: Sir William Taafe
- 1611: Roger Jones
- 1612: John Sharpe
- 1613: William Crofton
- 1614: George Nugent
- 1615: Roger Jones
- 1616: Walter Harrison
- 1617–18: James Stanghurst
- 1619: George Wood of Killarra
- 1620: Owen M'Dermott
- 1621: Robert St. John
- 1622: George Crofton
- 1623: John Nowlan
- 1624: Sir John Taaffe
- 1625: Roger Jones
- 1626: Robert Crecy
- 1627–1628: Jasper Brett of Rathdooney
- 1629–30: Andrew Crean
- 1631: Sir Roger Jones
- 1632: Thomas Crofton
- 1633: John Crofton
- 1634: Teige O'Higgin
- 1635: Jasper Brett of Rathdooney
- 1636: William Dodwell
- 1637–38: Thomas Crofton
- 1639: Kean O'Hara
- 1640: James French
- 1641–42: Andrew Crean
- 1643: James French
- 1644: Teighe O'Connor
- 1645: No Roll
- 16nn: Thomas Crofton
- 1651: Robert Parke
- 1655: Sir George St. George
- 1656: Robert Parke
- 16nn: Robert Morgan
- 16nn: Lewis Jones
- 16nn: Francis King
- 1659–60: John Booker
- 1661–62: Thomas Crofton
- 1663: Lewis Wingfield
- 1665: Kean O'Hara (son of Teige, HS 1608)
- 1664–66: Thomas Crofton
- 1667: Thomas Wood of Castle Lackan
- 1668: William Griffith
- 1669: William Ormsby
- 1670: Robert Coppayne
- 1671: Edward Nicholson.
- 1672: Anthony (or Adam) Ormsby of Cummin
- 1673: Thomas Radcliffe, Dublin
- 1674: Thomas Soden of Grange
- 1675: Jeremiah Jones of Ardnaglass
- 1676: Adam O'Hara of Colony (son of Kean, HS 1665)
- 1677 : Francis King of Knocklough
- 1678–79: Roger Smith of Cloverhill
- 1680: William Ormsby
- 1681–82: Sir Robert Gore, Knt., of Artarmon
- 1683–84: Richard Wood of Castle Lackan
- 1685: Charles Collis of Tireragh
- 1686: William Parke of Dunally
- 1687: Henry Crofton of Longford Castle, Drumard, County Sligo
- 1688–89: Edward Crofton of Longford Castle, Drumard, County Sligo
- 1690: Henry Griffith
- 1691: William Nicholson of Ardtainmain
- 1692: Roger Smith of Cloverhill
- 1693: Philip Ormsby
- 1694: Mathew Ormsby
- 1695: Adam Ormsby of Cummin
- 1696: Robert Ffolliott of Hollybrook
- 1697: Arthur Gore of Ardnaree
- 1698: Arthur Cooper of Tansyfort
- 1699: Percy Gethin

== 18th century ==
- source: History of Sligo
- 1700: William Ormsby
- 1701: William Smith of Knockshammer
- 1702: Francis King of Ballindune
- 1703: Kean O'Hara of Nymphsfield (son of Kean O'Hara, HS 1665)
- 1704: John Ormsby
- 1705: William Harlow of Rathmullin
- 1706: James Soden of Grange
- 1707: Thomas Jones of Ardnaree
- 1708: Henry (Humphry) Griffith of Ballytivenan
- 1709: Samuel Hughes of Bunnanaden
- 1710: Roger Jones of Ardnaglass
- 1711: John King of Ballindune
- 1712: Mathew Ormsby of Belvoir
- 1713: Kean O'Hara of Nymphsfield
- 1714: William Smith of Knocknasamer
- 1715: Francis Ormsby of Annagh
- 1716: Matthew Phillips (or Phibbs) of Templevaney
- 1717: George Wood of Castle Laccan
- 1718: Joshua Cooper of Marcray
- 1719: Richard Gore
- 1720: Roger Parke of Dunally
- 1721: George Ormsby of Belvoir
- 1722: Henry Irwin of Streamstown
- 1723: Owen Wynne, jnr of Hazelwood House, Sligo
- 1724: Sir Richard Gethin, 3rd Baronet
- 1725: William Ormsby of Annagh
- 1726: Samuel Hughes of Bunnanaden
- 1727: John Nicholson of Grange
- 1728: John Perceval of Temple House
- 1729: John Dodd of Ballintogher
- 1730: Edward Soden of Grange
- 1731: Colonel John Irwin of Tanragoe
- 1732: Jeremiah Fury of Skreen
- 1733: William Cooper of Lisbrislane
- 1734: John Knox of Sligo
- 1735: Robert Ffolliott of Hollybrook
- 1736: James Soden of Grange
- 1737: Michelburn Knox of Sligo
- 1738: Blashford Hughes of Beechwood
- 1739: Thomas Ormsby of Cummin
- 1740: Charles O'Hara of Nymphsfield (son of Kean, HS 1703)
- 1741: Edward Nicholson of Dublin
- 1742: John Perceval of Temple House
- 1743: Nicholas Ward or Watt of Cloverhill or Knocknashamer
- 1744: Gilbert King of Charlestown
- 1745: Owen Wynne, jnr of Hazelwood House, Sligo
- 1746: Lewis Ormsby of Straudhill
- 1747: Arthur Cooper of Tansyfort
- 1748: Cairncross Nesbitt of Leitrim
- 1749: Thomas Jones of Ardnaglass
- 1750: Gilbert Trumbel of Aghmore
- 1751: Jones Irwin of Streamstown
- 1752: John Knox of Castlerea
- 1752: Blashford Hughes of Bunnanaden
- 1753: George Knox of Sligo
- 1754: Philip Byrne of Gregg
- 1755: Christopher Jones of Carney
- 1756: Charles O'Hara of Nymphsfield
- 1757: William Ormsby of Willowbrook
- 1758: Owen Wynne of Hazelwood House, Sligo
- 1759: Gilbert Dodd of Ardagh
- Roger Dodwell (the younger)
- Henry Hughes of Beechwood
- 1761: Benjamin Burton of Carlow
- 1762: Henry King of Beleek
- 1763: Joshua Cooper of Markree Castle
- 1764: John French of French Park
- 1765: Francis Savage of Ballygawley
- 1766: Francis Knox of Rappa
- 1767: Robert Browne of Fortland
- 1768: William Ormsby of Willowbrook
- 1769: Harlow Phibbs of Bloomfield
- 1770: Sir Malby Crofton
- 1771: Sir Booth Gore, 1st Baronet
- 1772: Robert Hillas of Seaview
- 1773: Henry Thornton of Sligo
- 1774: Lewis Jones of Ardnaglass
- 1775: Philip Perceval of Temple House
- 1776: Henry Griffith of Ballytivenan
- 1777: Henry Hughes
- 1778: James Gallagher of Gevagh
- 1779: John Martin of Sligo
- 1780: Sir Percy Gethin, 5th Baronet of Sligo
- 1781: William Phibbs of Hollybrook
- 1782: George Dodwell of Chasse Poole
- 1783: Charles Costelo, of Edmondstown
- 1784: Charles Wood of Lackfield
- 1785: Charles O'Hara of Nymphsfield
- 1785: Sir Booth Gore, 2nd Baronet
- 1786: Andrew Kirkwood of Cottlestown
- 1787: Henry Irwin of Streamstown
- 1788: Harloe Knott of Battlefield
- 1789: William Gilmor of Ballyglass
- 1790: George Ormsby of Belvoir
- 1791: Richard Wood of Garrycliffe
- 1792: Thomas Ormsby of Cummin
- 1793: William Barrett of Sligo
- 1794: John Jones of Johnsport
- 1795: Arthur Irwin of Willowbrook
- 1796: Charles Wood of Chapelfield
- 1797: Thomas Ormsby of Castle Dargan
- 1798: James Wood of Leekfield
- 1799: Thomas Meredith of Cloonamahon

== 19th century ==
- 1800: Richard Phibbs
- 1801: Robert King Duke of Newpark
- 1802: William Griffith of Ballytivenan
- 1803: William Griffith of Ballytivenan
- 1804: Owen Phibbs
- 1805: Abraham Martin
- 1806: Sir Robert Newcomen Gore-Booth, 3rd Baronet
- 1807: Charles Martin and Michael Fenton
- 1808: Thomas Holmes of Farm Hill
- 1809: Alexander Perceval of Temple House
- 1810: Charles Nesbitt Knox of Scurmore House
- 1811: Arthur Brooke Cooper
- 1812: James Jones of Mount Edward
- 1813: John Tyler of Sligo
- 1814: (William) Harlow Phibbs of Sligo
- 1815: Edward Nicholson of The Glen
- 1816: Arthur Irwin of Oakfield
- 1817: John Armstrong of Chaffpool
- 1818: William Brydges Neynoe of Castle Neynoe
- 1819: Owen Wynne of Hazelwood House, Sligo
- 1820: Sir William Parke of Dunally
- 1821: John Phibbs of Spotfield and Hon Edward Wingfield
- 1822: John Irwin of Tanragoe
- 1823: John Ffolliott of Hollybrook
- 1824: John Frederick Knox of Mount Falcon, Ballina
- 1825: Robert William Hillas of Cregg-house
- 1826: James Wood of Woodville
- 1827: John Gethin of Auburn
- 1828: Charles Keane O'Hara, of Annaghmore, Collooney.
- 1829: Viscount Kirkwall of Earlsfield
- 1830: Sir Robert Gore-Booth, 4th Baronet of Lissadell House
- 1831: Robert Jones, jnr of Fortland
- 1832: Edward Loftus Neynoe of Castle Neynoe
- 1833: William Phibbs of Seafield
- 1834: John Ormsby of Castle Dargan
- 1835: Thomas Jones of Ardnaree and Castletown
- 1836: James Knott of Battlefield
- 1837: Daniel Jones, Snr of Banada Abbey
- 1838: Sir William Parke of Dunally
- 1839: Daniel Henry Farrel of Beechwood
- 1840: John Arthur Wynne of Hazelwood House, Sligo
- 1841: John Martin of Sligo
- 1842: Richard Gethin of Craig
- 1843: Arthur Brook Cooper of Coopersbill
- 1844: Sir Alexander Creighton, Kt. of Dirke
- 1845: Philip Perceval of Temple House
- 1846: Edward Joshua Cooper, of Markree, Colooney
- 1847: Henry Griffith of Port Royal and Castle Neynoe
- 1848: Edward Howley of Belleek Castle, Ballina
- 1849: Charles William Cooper, of Cooper Hill, Riverstown.
- 1850: Bernard Owen Cogan, of Lisconny-House, Collooney.
- 1851: John Ffolliott, jnr of Hollybrook
- 1852: John Irwin of Elphin
- 1853: Joseph Arthur Holmes of Clogher
- 1854: George J. Armstrong of Chaffpool
- 1855: Sir Malby Crofton, Bt. of Longford House
- 1856: Richard Graves Brinkley, Ardagh, Riverstown
- 1857: John Wingfield King of Fortland.
- 1858: Roger Parke of Dunally.
- 1859: Cornelius Alexander Keogh of Geevagh.
- 1860: John Woulfe Flanagan of Drumdo.
- 1861: Edward King Tenison of Kilronan Castle, Keadue
- 1862: Abraham Martin, Bloomfield.
- 1863: Charles Owen O'Conor of Belanagare and Clonalis.
- 1864: Pierce Simpson of Clooncorrig.
- 1865: Charles P. Webber of Carrowculllen.
- 1866: Peter O'Connor of Cairnsfoot.
- 1867: Captain James Jones of Mount Edward.
- 1868: Robert Owen
- 1868: Patrick C. Howley of Couga.
- 1869: James Hale of Easkey.
- 1870: Owen Cogan of Lake View, Ballymote.
- 1871: Edward Henry Cooper of Markree Castle
- 1872: Sir Henry William Gore-Booth, 5th Baronet
- 1873: James Wood Armstrong, R.N. of Chaffpool.
- 1874: Owen Wynne of Hazelwood House, Sligo
- 1875: Richard J. Verschoyle of Tanragoe.
- 1876: William James Griffith of Castle Neynoe.
- 1877: William Gregory Wood (later Wood-Martin) of Woodville.
- 1878: John Francis Walker of Rathcarrick.
- 1879: W. Robert Orme of Enniscrone.
- 1880: Robert A. Duke of Newpark.
- 1881: Harper Campbell of Hermitage.
- 1882: Alexander Perceval of Temple House
- 1883: Sir Malby Crofton, Bt. of Longford House, Colooney.
- 1884: Owen Phibbs of Cobradoo.
- 1885: John Lloyd Brinkley of Fortland.
- 1886: Charles Kean O'Hara of Annaghmore.
- 1887: Robert William Hillas of Doonecoy
- 1888: Sir Charles Knox Gore, Bt. of Belleek
- 1889: Hon. Evelyn Ashley of Classiebawn Castle.
- 1890: Henry Hastings Jones. of Ardnaree
- 1891: James Campbell.
- 1892: Alexander Joseph Crichton.
- 1893: George Gethin of Holywell.
- 1894:
- 1896: Robert William Goodwin Hillas of Doonecoy.
- 1897: Anthony Thomas Gilfoyle of Carrowcullen.

== 20th century ==
- 1900:
- 1902: Henry McCarrick of Kilglass House, Ballina.
- 1903: Arthur Cooper O'Hara.
- 1904: Sir Josslyn Augustus Richard Gore-Booth, 6th Baronet.
- 1905:
- 1908: Bryan Ricco Cooper of Markree Castle.
- 1910: Roger Kennedy Parke.
- 1911: Frederick William O'Hara.
- 1912:
- 1914: Christopher Guy Orme.
- 1915: Charles John Boyle of The Priory, Gt. Milton, Wallingford.
- 1916: Colonel James Nicholson Soden Kirkwood, Woodbrook, County Roscommon/Carrowmabla, County Sligo.
- 1918: R.E. O'Hara.
