= Charles O'Hara (disambiguation) =

Charles O'Hara (1740–1802) was a British Army general and colonial administrator.

Charles O'Hara may refer to:

- Charles O'Hara (politician) (1746–1822), Irish landowner and politician
- Charles O'Hara, 1st Baron Tyrawley (died 1724), Irish soldier, commander-in-chief of the Royal Irish Army
- Charles William O'Hara (1817–1870), Irish politician
- Charles Kean O'Hara (1860–1947), his son, Irish landowner
