= William Gregory Wood-Martin =

Irish antiquarian and author

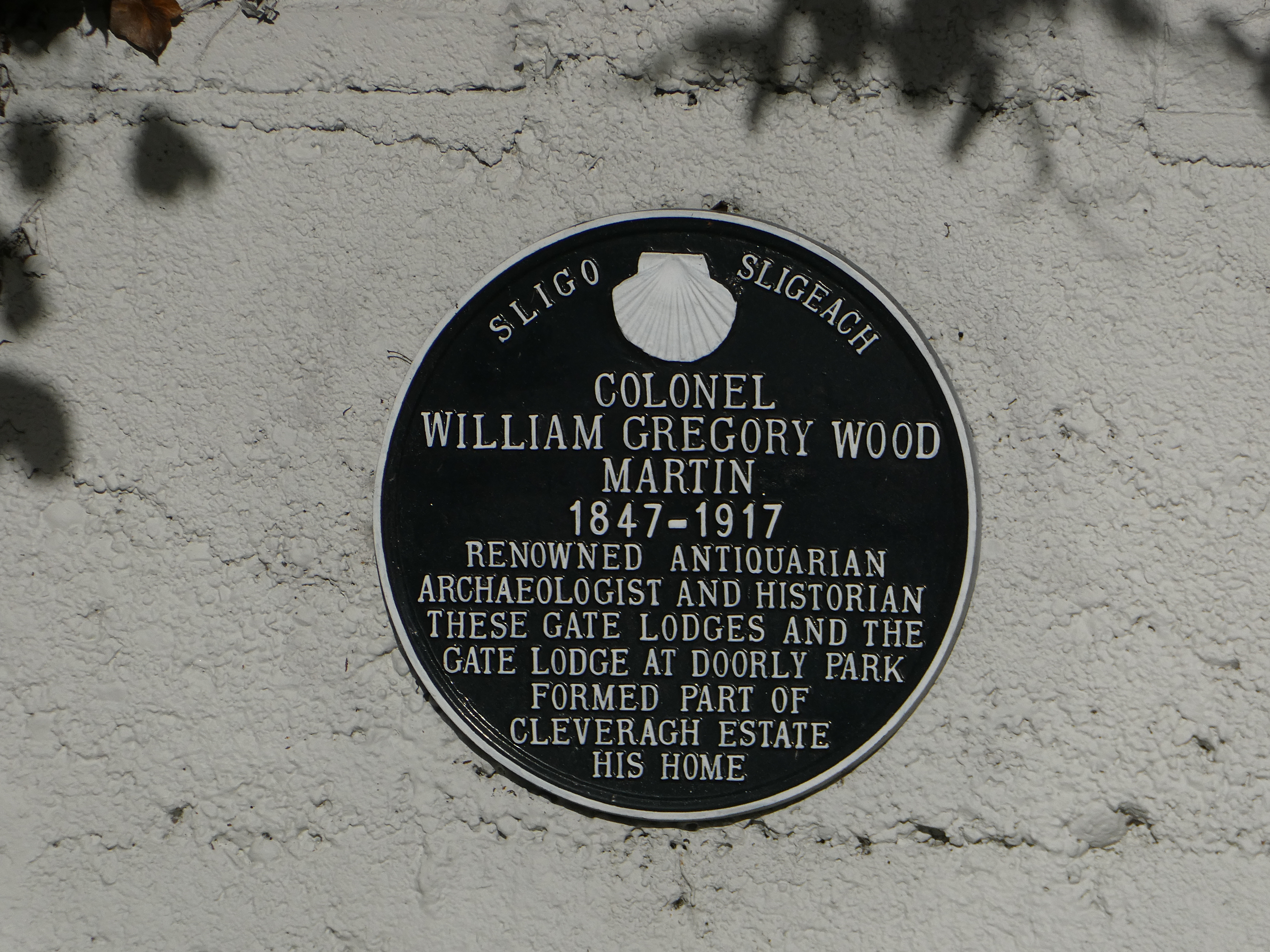
- Memorial plaque in Sligo

High Sheriff of Sligo
- In office 1877

Personal details
- Born: 16 July 1847 County Sligo, Ireland
- Died: 16 November 1917 (aged 70) County Sligo, Ireland
- Spouse: France Dodwell-Robinson (m. 1873)
- Children: 6
- Education: Royal Military College, Sandhurst
- Military career
- Allegiance: Great Britain
- Branch: British Army
- Rank: Colonel
- Unit: 24th Regiment of Foot

Colonel William Gregory Wood-Martin (16 July 1847 – 16 November 1917) was an author and antiquarian, best known for his work as an archaeologist in Ireland.

== Early life ==
William Gregory Wood-Martin was born in County Sligo in Ireland on 16 July 1847 in the midst of the Great Famine. His parents, James Wood and Anne Martin, were also both natives of County Sligo and, as their only child, he was the heir to both the Woodville and Cleveragh estates. Wood-Martin received his early education at home, and completed his academic training first in Switzerland, and then in Belgium.

== Military career ==
Upon the completion of his education, in 1866 he joined the British Army and studied at the Royal Military College, Sandhurst, after which he was commissioned into the 24th Regiment of Foot. He served as a lieutenant colonel in the 8th Brigade, North Irish Division, and spent the remainder of his career attached to the Sligo Artillery and the Sligo Rifles, where he was lieutenant colonel in command between April 1883 and November 1902. He received medals for his service as an Aide-de-Camp (militia) from three successive British Monarchs; Queen Victoria, King Edward VII, and King George V.

== Marriage and return to Sligo ==
In 1873, Wood-Martin married Frances Dorothea Dodwell-Robinson, another Sligo native, who joined him first in Brighton and then in Dublin, following the demands of his career. In 1877 Wood-Martin returned to Cleveragh House, his mothers' family home in east Sligo town, to care for his ailing father. Upon his return, Wood-Martin was appointed as High Sheriff of Sligo, and served in this role in 1877. The income from his estates likely served as the bulk of his financial support at the end of this term, however he was active in his community and served as a justice of the peace and deputy lieutenant of the county.

== The Royal Historical and Archaeological Association of Ireland ==
Though Wood-Martin became a member of the Royal Irish Academy in 1883, and both published with and presented to that august body, his association with the Royal Historical and Archaeological Association of Ireland, (later the Royal Society of Antiquaries of Ireland), dominated his antiquarian career.

Wood-Martin became a fellow of the Association in October 1882, and was appointed as The Local Secretary for Sligo in 1883. That fall, he hosted a meeting of the Association in Sligo. In 1886, when the men holding the positions of Honorary Provincial Secretary for Connaught for the Association and Editor of the Association's journal died, Wood-Martin was appointed to these positions. In January 1888, Wood-Martin became the Associations Honorary Secretary alongside William Frederick Wakeman. Wood-Martins membership in the Association was a troubled one. His Editorship only lasted for three years, and a quiet fog of scandal hangs over his departure. There were ongoing issues between Wood-Martin and the Council of the Association about the size and contents of the journal, as well as his apparent misplacing of some valuable wood blocks which belonged to the Association. He resigned as Editor in 1889, and ceased publishing in the journal. He left the organisation entirely in 1892. Afterwards, Wood-Martin began publishing in the Ulster Journal of Archaeology as a member of the Ulster Archaeological Society, which had just been founded.

== Personal life and death ==
Wood-Martin and his wife, Francis Dorothea, had six children; James Isadore, Henry Roger, Gregory Gonville, Francis Winchester, Frances Nora, and Annette Kathleen. Only three of his children survived him; Henry Rodger, Gregory Gonville, and Annette Kathleen, and only Gregory married and had children. Wood-Martin died on 16 November 1917 at his Cleveragh estate. His children erected a granite memorial to his memory in the cemetery at St. Anne's in Strandhill, Co. Sligo.

== Publications ==
- Wood-Martin, W.G. (1880), Sligo and the Enniskilliners, 1688–1691
- Wood-Martin, W.G., History of Sligo, County and Town
  - Preface, Books I-V, vol. 1, 1882
  - Book VI, vol. 2, 1889
  - Book VII, vol. 3, 1892
- Wood-Martin, W.G. (October 1884), "The Battle-ground and Ancient Monuments of Northern Moytirra.", The Journal of the Royal Historical and Archaeological Association of Ireland, 4th series, 6 (60): 442–482, JSTOR 25506917
- Wood-Martin, W.G. (1886), The Lake Dwellings of Ireland : or Lacustrine Habitations of Erin, commonly called Crannogs, Hodges, Figgsis, & Co. : Dublin; Longmans, Green, & Co. : London
- Wood-Martin, W.G., "The Rude Stone Monuments of Ireland and the Island of Achill", The Journal of the Royal Historical and Archaeological Association of Ireland, 4th series
  - Part I, vol. 7, July 1886, pp. 470–487, JSTOR 25506962
  - Part II, vol. 7, October 1886 – January 1887, pp. 539–595, JSTOR 25506375
  - Part III, vol. 8, April 1887, pp. 50–94, JSTOR 25506400
  - Part IV-, vol. 8, July–October 1887, pp. 118–159, JSTOR 25506408
  - Part VI-, vol. 8, January–April 1888, pp. 254–299, JSTOR 25506430
  - Part VIII-, vol. 8, July 1888, pp. 367–381, JSTOR 25506457
- Wood-Martin, W.G. (1895), Pagan Ireland: An Archaeological Sketch, Longmans, Green, and Co. : London
- Wood-Martin, W.G. (1901), Traces of the Elder Faiths of Ireland, Longmans, Green, and Co.
  - Volume 1, 24 January 2024
  - Volume 2, 24 January 2024
- Wood-Martin, W.G., "Bronze serpentine latches and other cumbrous dress fasteners.", Ulster Journal of Archaeology
  - Bronze serpentine latches ..., vol. 9, Belfast [Ulster Archaeological Society], 1903, pp. 160–166
  - Bronze serpentine latches ..., vol. 10, Belfast [Ulster Archaeological Society], 1904, pp. 12–20
  - Bronze serpentine latches ..., vol. 11, Belfast [Ulster Archaeological Society], 1905, pp. 33–39
