= Constance Markievicz =

Irish revolutionary and suffragist (1868–1927)

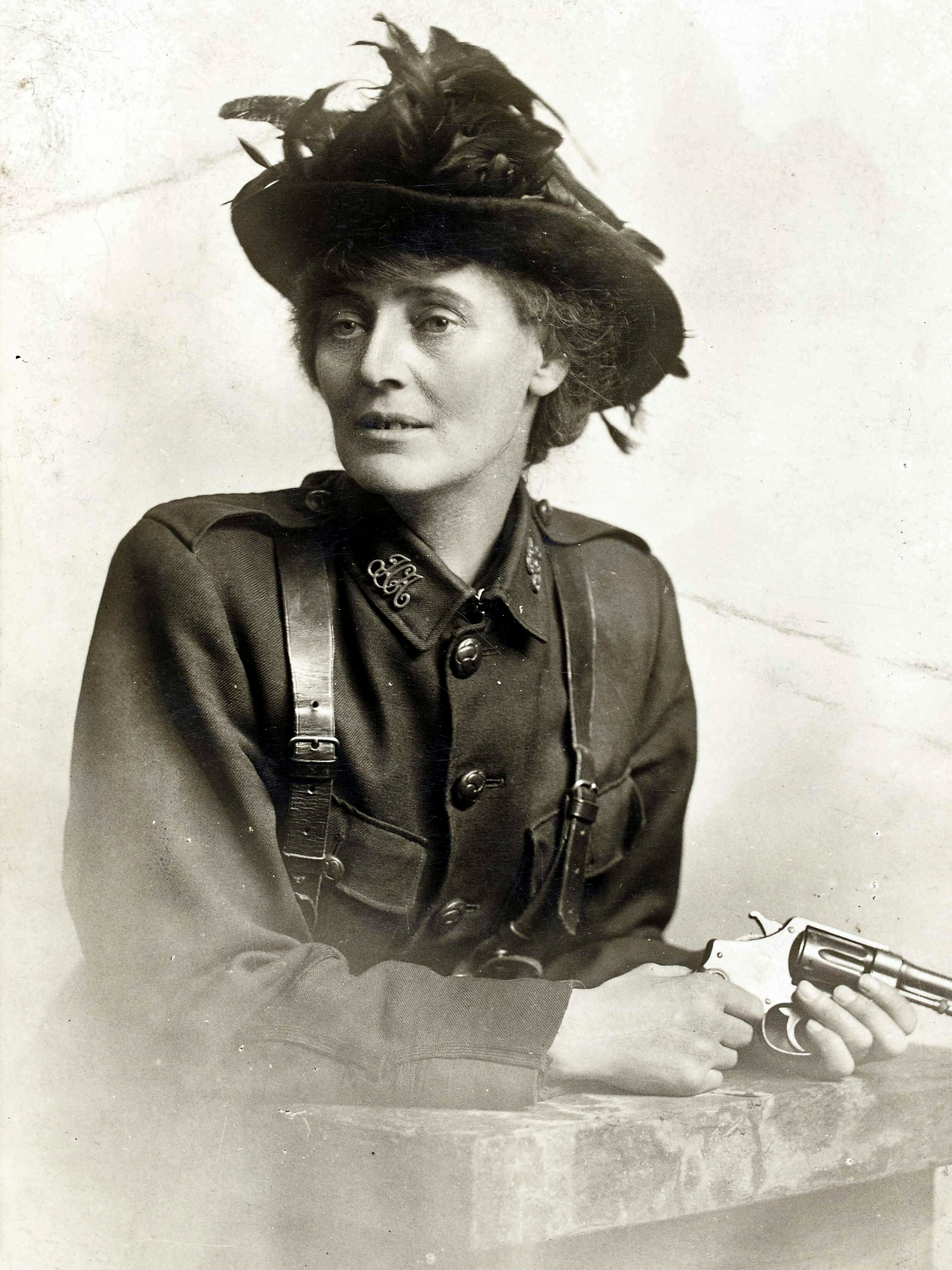
- Markievicz in her Irish Citizen Army uniform

Minister for Labour
- In office April 1919 – January 1922
- President: Éamon de Valera
- Preceded by: New office
- Succeeded by: Joseph McGrath

Teachta Dála
- In office August 1923 – 15 July 1927
- In office May 1921 – June 1922
- Constituency: Dublin South
- In office December 1918 – May 1921
- Constituency: Dublin St Patrick's

Member of Parliament
- In office 28 December 1918 – 15 November 1922
- Preceded by: William Field
- Succeeded by: Constituency abolished
- Constituency: Dublin St Patrick's

Personal details
- Born: Constance Georgine Gore-Booth; 4 February 1868 7 Buckingham Gate, London, England
- Died: 15 July 1927 (aged 59) Dublin, Ireland
- Resting place: Glasnevin Cemetery
- Party: Fianna Fáil (1926–1927); Sinn Féin (1908–1926)
- Spouse: Casimir Markievicz (m. 1900)
- Relations: Eva Gore-Booth (sister); Sir Robert Gore-Booth, 4th Baronet (grandfather)
- Children: 1
- Parent: Sir Henry Gore-Booth (father)

Military service
- Allegiance: Irish Republic
- Branch/service: Irish Citizen Army; Irish Republican Army; Cumann na mBan
- Years of service: 1913–1923
- Rank: Lieutenant
- Conflicts: Dublin Lockout; Easter Rising; Irish War of Independence; Irish Civil War

Constance Georgine Markievicz (Polish: Markiewicz [marˈkʲɛvitʂ]; née Gore-Booth; 4 February 1868 – 15 July 1927), also known as Countess Markievicz and Madame Markievicz, was an Irish republican politician, suffragist, socialist and labour activist who was the first woman elected to the Parliament of the United Kingdom. Born into the Anglo-Irish ruling-class, Markievicz abandoned her social position in favour of Irish independence and social reform. A founding member of Fianna Éireann, Cumann na mBan and the Irish Citizen Army, she took part in the Easter Rising in 1916, when Irish republicans attempted to end British rule and establish an Irish Republic. She was sentenced to death but her sentence was commuted to life imprisonment on the grounds of her sex.

On 28 December 1918, at the 1918 general election (while in Holloway Prison), she became the first woman elected as a Member of Parliament (MP) to the House of Commons of the United Kingdom; in accordance with the abstentionist policy of the Sinn Féin manifesto, she did not take her seat on her release, serving as a TD in the revolutionary Dáil Éireann. She served as a TD for Dublin St Patrick's from 1918 to 1921, and for Dublin South from 1921 to 1922. She served as Minister for Labour in the Ministry of Dáil Éireann from 1919 to 1922, becoming the second female cabinet minister in Europe. (Note: Alexandra Kollontai was People's Commissar (Minister) for Social Welfare of Soviet Russia from 1917 to 1918.) She served again as a TD for Dublin South constituency 1923 until her death in 1927.

Markievicz opposed the Anglo-Irish Treaty and supported the Anti-Treaty forces in the Irish Civil War. She left Sinn Féin in 1926 to become a founding member of Fianna Fáil.

== Early life ==
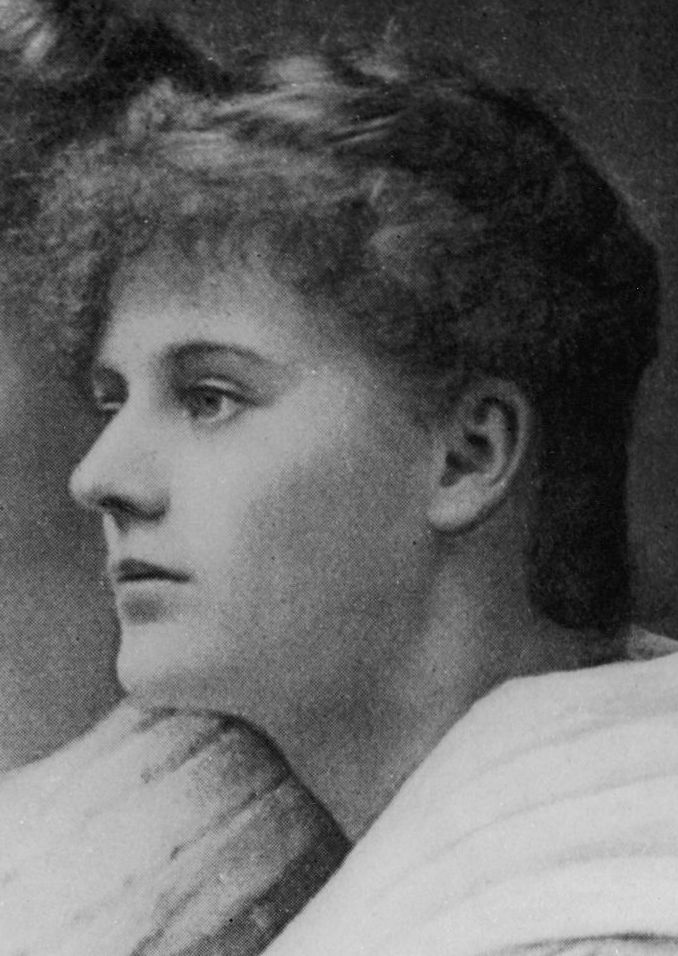
Constance Gore-Booth, later known as Constance Markievicz

Markievicz was born Constance Georgine Gore-Booth on 4 February 1868 at 7 Buckingham Gate, London to Henry Gore-Booth (later Sir Henry Gore-Booth, 5th Baronet) and Georgina Mary Gore-Booth (née Hill, later Lady Georgina Gore-Booth). Markievicz's father was an Anglo-Irish arctic explorer and later landowner and landlord of Lissadell House, and her mother was British and founded the Lissadell School of needlework. Following the death of her paternal grandfather Sir Robert Gore-Booth, 4th Baronet in 1876, Markievicz's father became the 5th Baronet of Artarman and took over the running of the family estate.

The eldest of five siblings, Markievicz was the sister of the poet and labour activist Eva Gore-Booth. During the Irish Famine of 1879, Markievicz's father reinstated the Carney and Drumcliffe Relief Committees and provided free food donations to his tenants. Their father's example inspired in Gore-Booth and her younger sister, Eva, a deep concern for working people and the poor. The sisters were childhood friends of the poet W. B. Yeats, who frequently visited the family home Lissadell House, and were influenced by his artistic and political ideas. Yeats wrote a poem, "In Memory of Eva Gore-Booth and Con Markiewicz", in which he described the sisters as "two girls in silk kimono, both beautiful, one a gazelle", the gazelle being Eva, whom Yeats described as having "a gazelle-like beauty". Eva later became involved in the labour movement and women's suffrage in Great Britain, although initially Constance did not share her sister's ideals.

Gore-Booth wished to train as a painter, to her family's dismay; in 1892, she went to study at the Slade School of Art in London, where she lived at the Alexandra House for Art Pupils, Kensington Gore, founded five years before by Sir Francis Cook, a wealthy great-uncle of Maud Gonne. One of her contemporaries there was Blanche Georgiana Vulliamy. It was at this time that Gore-Booth first became politically active and joined the National Union of Women's Suffrage Societies (NUWSS). Later she moved to Paris and enrolled at the prestigious Académie Julian where she met her future husband, Casimir Markievicz (Kazimierz Markiewicz) an artist from a wealthy Polish landowning family in present-day Ukraine (then under the rule of the Russian Empire).

The Markieviczes (or Markiewiczes) settled in Dublin in 1903 and moved in artistic and literary circles, with Constance gaining a reputation as a landscape painter. In 1905, along with artists Sarah Purser, Nathaniel Hone, Walter Osborne and John Butler Yeats, she was instrumental in founding the United Arts Club, which was an attempt to bring together all those in Dublin with an artistic and literary bent. This group included the leading figures of the Gaelic League founded by the future first President of Ireland, Douglas Hyde. Although formally concerned only with the preservation of the Irish language and culture, the league brought together many patriots and future political leaders. Sarah Purser, whom the young Gore-Booth sisters first met in 1882, when she was commissioned to paint their portrait, hosted a regular salon where artists, writers and intellectuals on both sides of the nationalist divide gathered. At Purser's house, Markievicz met revolutionary patriots Michael Davitt, John O'Leary and Maud Gonne. In 1907, Markievicz rented a cottage in the countryside near Dublin. The previous tenant, the poet Padraic Colum, had left behind copies of The Peasant and Sinn Féin. These revolutionary journals promoted independence from British rule. Markievicz read them and was propelled into action.

== Politics ==
In 1908, Markievicz became actively involved in nationalist politics in Ireland. She joined Sinn Féin and Inghinidhe na hÉireann ("Daughters of Ireland"), a revolutionary women's movement founded by the actress and activist Maud Gonne, muse of W. B. Yeats. Markievicz came directly to her first meeting from a function at Dublin Castle, the seat of British rule in Ireland, wearing a satin ball gown and a diamond tiara. This refreshing change from being "kowtowed"-to as a countess only made her more eager to join, she told her friend Helena Molony. She performed with Maud Gonne in several plays at the newly established Abbey Theatre, an institution that played an important part in the rise of cultural nationalism. In the same year, Markievicz played a dramatic role in the women's suffrage campaigners' tactic of opposing Winston Churchill during the 1908 Manchester North West by-election, flamboyantly appearing in the constituency driving an old-fashioned carriage drawn by four white horses to promote the suffragist cause. A male heckler asked her if she could cook a dinner, to which she responded, "Yes. Can you drive a coach and four?" Her sister Eva had moved to Manchester to live with fellow suffragist Esther Roper and they both campaigned against the anti-suffragist Churchill with her. Churchill lost the election to Conservative candidate William Joynson-Hicks, in part as a result of the suffragists' dedicated opposition.

In 1909 Markievicz founded Fianna Éireann, a nationalist scouting organisation that instructed teenage boys in scouting, in the style of Robert Baden-Powell's then-paramilitary Boy Scouts. At the Fianna's first meeting in Camden Street, Dublin, on 16 August 1909, she was almost expelled on the basis that women did not belong in a physical force movement. She had drawn in Bulmer Hobson, who had earlier founded a less successful boy scout group in Belfast. He supported her and she was elected to the committee. She was jailed for the first time in 1911 for speaking at an Irish Republican Brotherhood demonstration attended by 30,000 people, organised to protest against George V's visit to Ireland. During this protest, Markievicz handed out leaflets, erected great banners emblazoned "Dear land thou art not conquered yet", participated in stone-throwing at pictures of the King and Queen and attempted to burn the giant British flag taken from Leinster House, eventually succeeding, but then seeing James McArdle imprisoned for one month for the incident, despite Markievicz testifying in court that she was responsible. Her friend Helena Molony was arrested for her part in the stone-throwing and became the first woman in Ireland to be tried and imprisoned for a political act since the time of the Ladies' Land League.

Markievicz joined James Connolly's socialist Irish Citizen Army (ICA), a volunteer force formed in response to the lock-out of 1913 to defend the demonstrating workers from the police. Markievicz recruited volunteers to peel potatoes in the basement of Liberty Hall while she and others worked on distributing the food. Markievicz was forced to take out loans and to sell her jewellery. That year, with Inghinidhe na hÉireann, she ran a soup kitchen to feed poor children and enable them to attend school.

In the Inghininidhe na h-Éireann magazine Bean na h-Éireann, Markievicz's advice to women was: "Dress suitably in short skirts and strong boots, leave your jewels in the bank and buy a revolver."

== Easter Rising ==
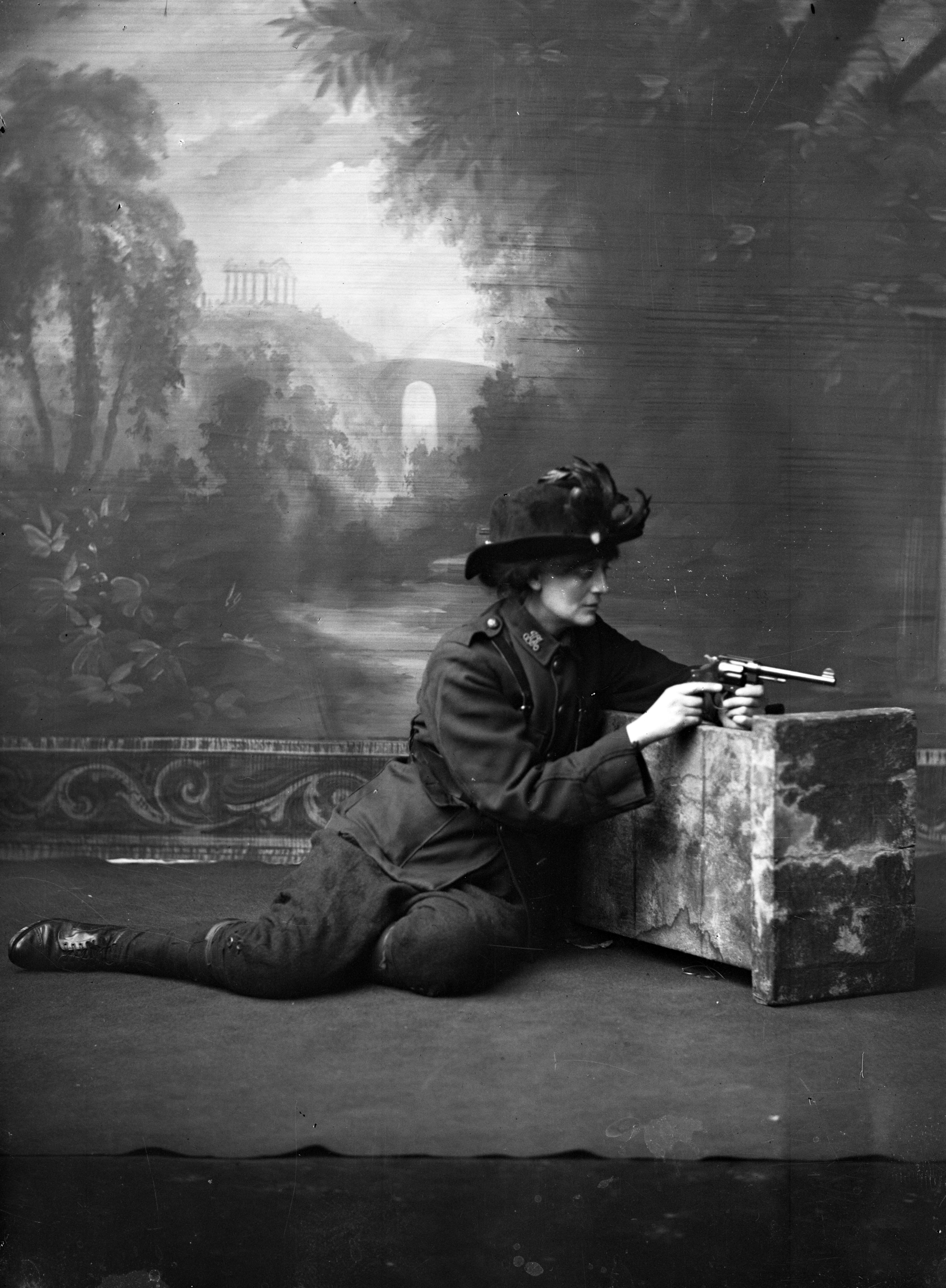
Markievicz in uniform examining a Colt New Service Model 1909 revolver, posed c. 1915

As a member of the Citizen Army, Markievicz took part in the 1916 Easter Rising. She was deeply inspired by the founder of the ICA, James Connolly. Markievicz designed the Citizen Army uniform and composed its anthem, based on the tune of a Polish song.

Markievicz fought in St Stephen's Green, where on the first morning —according to the only two pages surviving of the diary of an alleged witness — she shot a member of the Dublin Metropolitan Police, Constable Lahiff, who subsequently died of his injuries. Other accounts place her at City Hall when the policeman was shot, only arriving at Stephen's Green later. It was long thought that she was second in command to Michael Mallin, but in fact it was Kit Poole who held that position. Markievicz supervised the setting-up of barricades on Easter Monday and was in the middle of the fighting all around Stephen's Green, wounding a British army sniper. Trenches were dug in the Green, sheltered by the front gate; however, after British machine gun and rifle fire from the rooftops of tall buildings on the north side of the Green including the Shelbourne Hotel, the Citizen Army troops withdrew to the Royal College of Surgeons on the west side of the Green.

The Stephen's Green garrison held out for six days, ending the engagement when the British brought them Pearse's surrender order. The British officer, Captain (later Major) de Courcy Wheeler, who accepted their surrender was married to Markievicz's first cousin, Selina Maude Beresford Knox.

They were taken to Dublin Castle and then to Kilmainham Gaol through what Matt Connolly described as "several groups of hostile people". There, she was the only one of 70 women prisoners who was put into solitary confinement. At her court-martial on 4 May 1916, Markievicz pleaded not guilty to "taking part in an armed rebellion...for the purpose of assisting the enemy," but pleaded guilty to having attempted "to cause disaffection among the civil population of His Majesty". Markievicz told the court, "I went out to fight for Ireland's freedom and it does not matter what happens to me. I did what I thought was right and I stand by it." She was sentenced to death, but the court recommended mercy "solely and only on account of her sex". The sentence was commuted to life in prison. When told of this, she said to her captors, "I do wish your lot had the decency to shoot me". (Note: A quite different account was given by 2-Lt William Wylie KC, the prosecutor, writing 23 years later in 1939: he said that she "curled up completely", "never stopped moaning" and cried "I am only a woman, and you cannot shoot a woman. You must not shoot a woman.")

Markievicz was transferred to Mountjoy Prison, Holloway Prison and then to Aylesbury Prison in England in July 1916. She was released from prison in 1917, along with others involved in the Rising, as the government in London granted a general amnesty for those who had participated in it. It was around this time that Markievicz, born into the Church of Ireland, converted to Catholicism.

== First Dáil ==
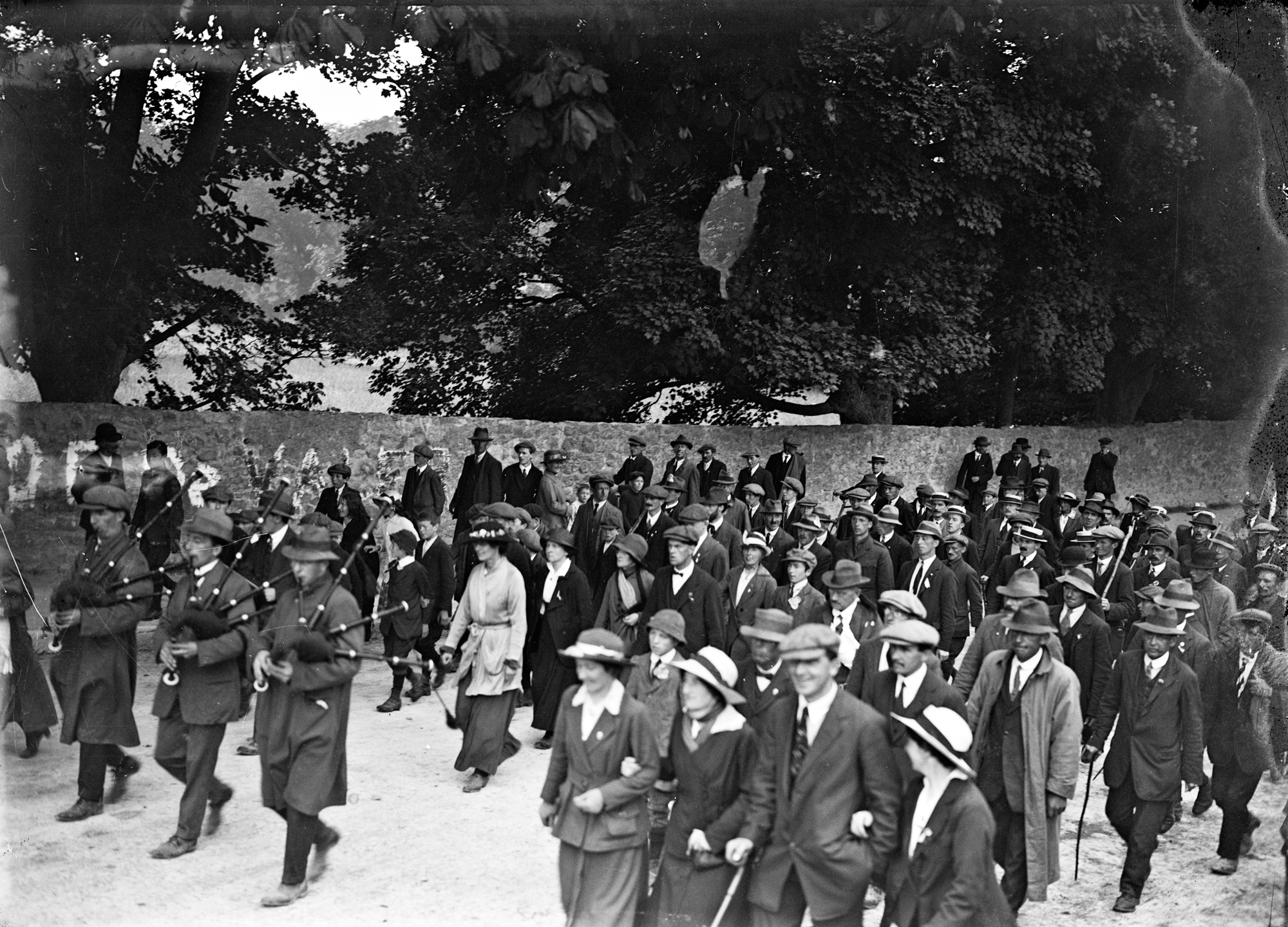
Election victory procession led by Markievicz in County Clare, circa 1918

Along with other leading Sinn Féin members, she was jailed again in 1918 for her part in the supposed German Plot. At the 1918 general election, Sinn Féin won 73 of the 105 seats in Ireland; Markievicz was elected as MP for Dublin St Patrick's, beating her opponent William Field with 66% of the vote. The results were called on 28 December 1918. This made her the first woman elected to the United Kingdom House of Commons. However, in line with Sinn Féin abstentionist policy, she did not take her seat in the House of Commons.

Markievicz was in Holloway prison when her colleagues assembled in Dublin at the first meeting of the First Dáil, the Parliament of the revolutionary Irish Republic. When her name was called, she was described, like many of those elected, as being "imprisoned by the foreign enemy" (fé ghlas ag Gallaibh). She was re-elected to the Second Dáil in the 1921 election.

Markievicz served as Minister for Labour from April 1919 to January 1922, in the Second Ministry and the Third Ministry of the Dáil. Holding cabinet rank from April to August 1919, she became both the first Irish female cabinet Minister and at the same time, only the second female government minister in Europe. No other woman was appointed to cabinet until 1979 when Máire Geoghegan-Quinn was appointed as Minister for the Gaeltacht for Fianna Fáil. Her Labour department was concerned with setting up Conciliation Boards, arbitrating labour disputes, surveying areas and establishing guidelines for wages and food prices.

== Civil War and Fianna Fáil ==
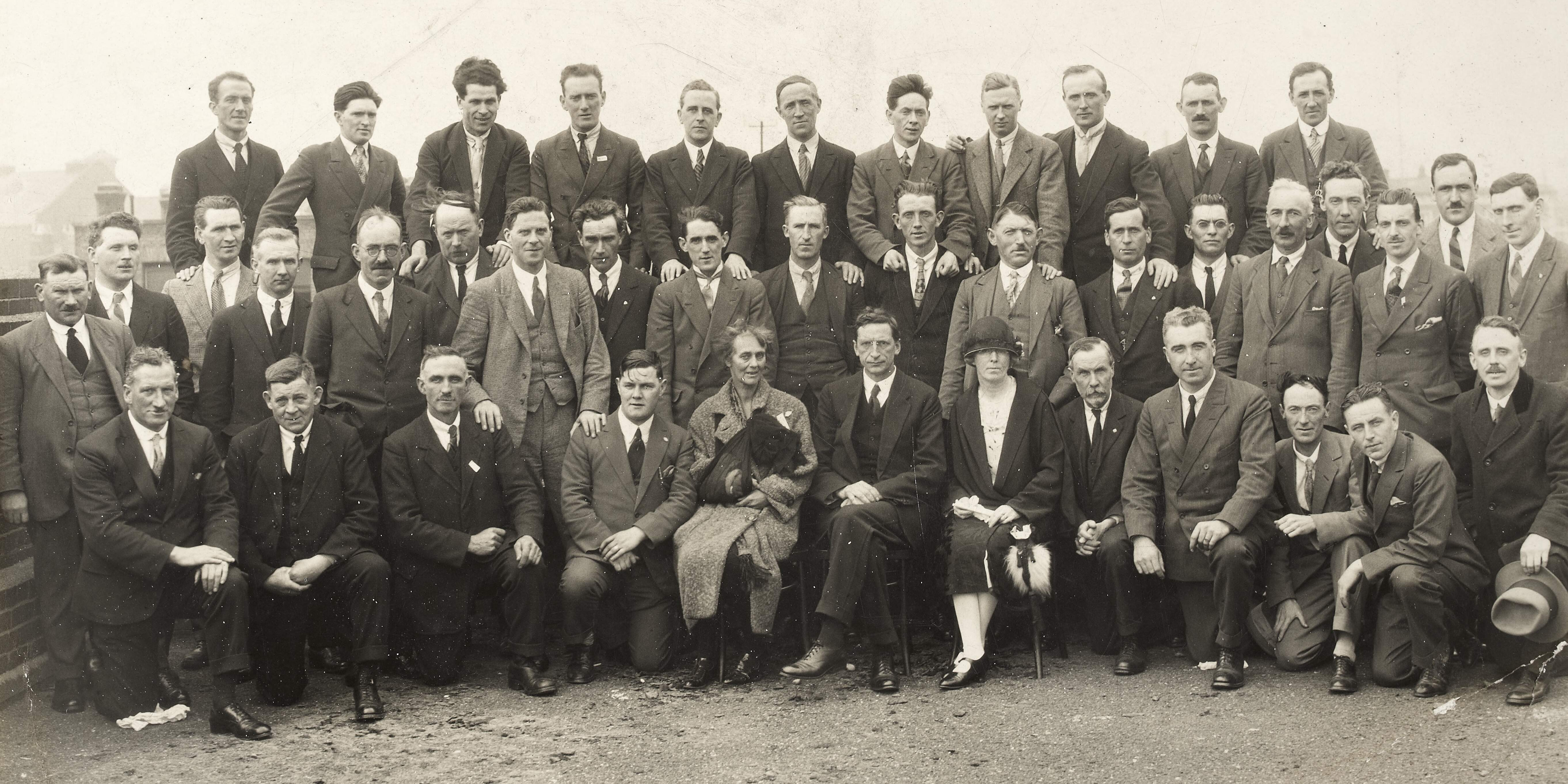
A 1927 group shot of founding members of Fianna Fáil, with Markievicz placed front and centre beside leader Éamon de Valera

Markievicz left the government in January 1922 along with Éamon de Valera and others in opposition to the Anglo-Irish Treaty. She worked actively for the Republican cause in the Irish Civil War, including directing the Citizen Army in the occupation of Moran's Hotel in Dublin. During the Battle of Dublin (28 June to 5 July 1922) she helped lead the anti-Treaty forces of the IRAs Dublin Brigade. Members of Cumann na mBan assisted the anti-treaty forces and carried dispatches between the occupied Four Courts buildings and the Dublin Brigade headquarters. After the civil war she toured the United States. She lost her seat in the 1922 general election but was returned at the 1923 general election, again for Dublin South. In common with other Republican candidates, she did not take her Dáil seat. She was arrested again in November 1923. In prison, she went on a hunger strike and, within a month, was released with other prisoners.

She left Sinn Féin and joined Fianna Fáil on its foundation in 1926, chairing the inaugural meeting of the new party in La Scala Theatre. In the June 1927 general election, she was re-elected to the 5th Dáil as a candidate for Fianna Fáil, which was pledged to take its seats in Dáil Éireann if the requirement to take the Oath of Allegiance were removed. Markievicz died on 15 July 1927. Following the assassination of Kevin O'Higgins and proposed changes in electoral law, Fianna Fáil altered its policy. Its TDs signed the Oath and took their seats in the Dáil on 12 August 1927, less than a month after her death. The party leader Éamon de Valera described the Oath as "an empty political formula".

== Family life ==
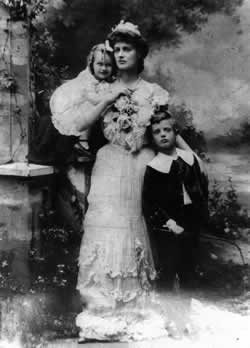
Markievicz with her daughter and stepson

Constance's husband, Casimir Markievicz, was known in Paris as Count Markievicz, a title that was the norm for large landowners in Poland at this time. When the Gore-Booth family enquired as to the validity of the title, they were informed through Pyotr Rachkovsky of the Russian Secret Police that he had taken the title "without right" and that there had never been a "Count Markievicz" in Poland. However, the Department of Genealogy in Saint Petersburg said that he was entitled to claim to be a member of the nobility. Markievicz was married, though separated, at the time they met; his wife died in 1899 and he and Gore-Booth married in London on 29 September 1900. She gave birth to their daughter, Maeve, at Lissadell in November 1901. The child was mainly raised by her Gore-Booth grandparents. Stanislas, Casimir's son from his first marriage, accompanied the couple to Ireland after their honeymoon visit to his homeland.

In 1913, Markievicz's husband moved back to Poland and never returned to live in Ireland. However, they did correspond and he was by her side when she died.

== Death ==
Markievicz died at the age of 59 on 15 July 1927, of complications after two appendicitis operations, a dangerous surgery in the days before antibiotics. She had given away the last of her wealth. She died in a public ward "among the poor where she wanted to be". One of the doctors attending her was her revolutionary colleague Kathleen Lynn. Also at her bedside were Casimir and Stanislas Markievicz, Éamon de Valera and Hanna Sheehy Skeffington. Prior to her death, Esther Roper maintained a vigil at Constance's bed with Marie Perolz, Helena Molony, Kathleen Lynn and other friends. Refused a state funeral by the Free State government, she was laid out in the Rotunda, where she had spoken at so many political meetings. Thousands of Dubliners lined O'Connell Street and Parnell Square to pass by her body and pay their respects to 'Madame'. It took four hours for the beginning of the funeral, starting from the Rotunda, to reach the gates of Glasnevin Cemetery. Éamon de Valera gave the funeral oration, while Free State soldiers stood on guard to prevent the rifle salute that Michael Collins had called "the only speech which it is proper to make above the grave of a dead Fenian".

Her former Citizen Army colleague the playwright Seán O'Casey said of her: "One thing she had in abundance—physical courage; with that she was clothed as with a garment."

== Tributes ==
In County Sligo Markievicz Road and Markievicz Park (the main GAA stadium in the county) both bear her name. In Dublin, the flat complex Countess Markiewicz House also bears her name.

In 2018, a portrait of Markievicz was donated by the Irish parliament to the British House of Commons to commemorate the Representation of the People Act 1918, under which, some women were allowed the right to vote for the first time in the United Kingdom.

In 2019, a Dublin City Council Commemorative Plaque was unveiled at Markievicz's former home in Dublin, Surrey House on Leinster Road in Rathmines.

In 2008, a Ukrainian village of Zhyvotivka, where Constance stayed with the Markievicz family in 1903, opened a room dedicated to the couple with the documents brought from Lissadel.

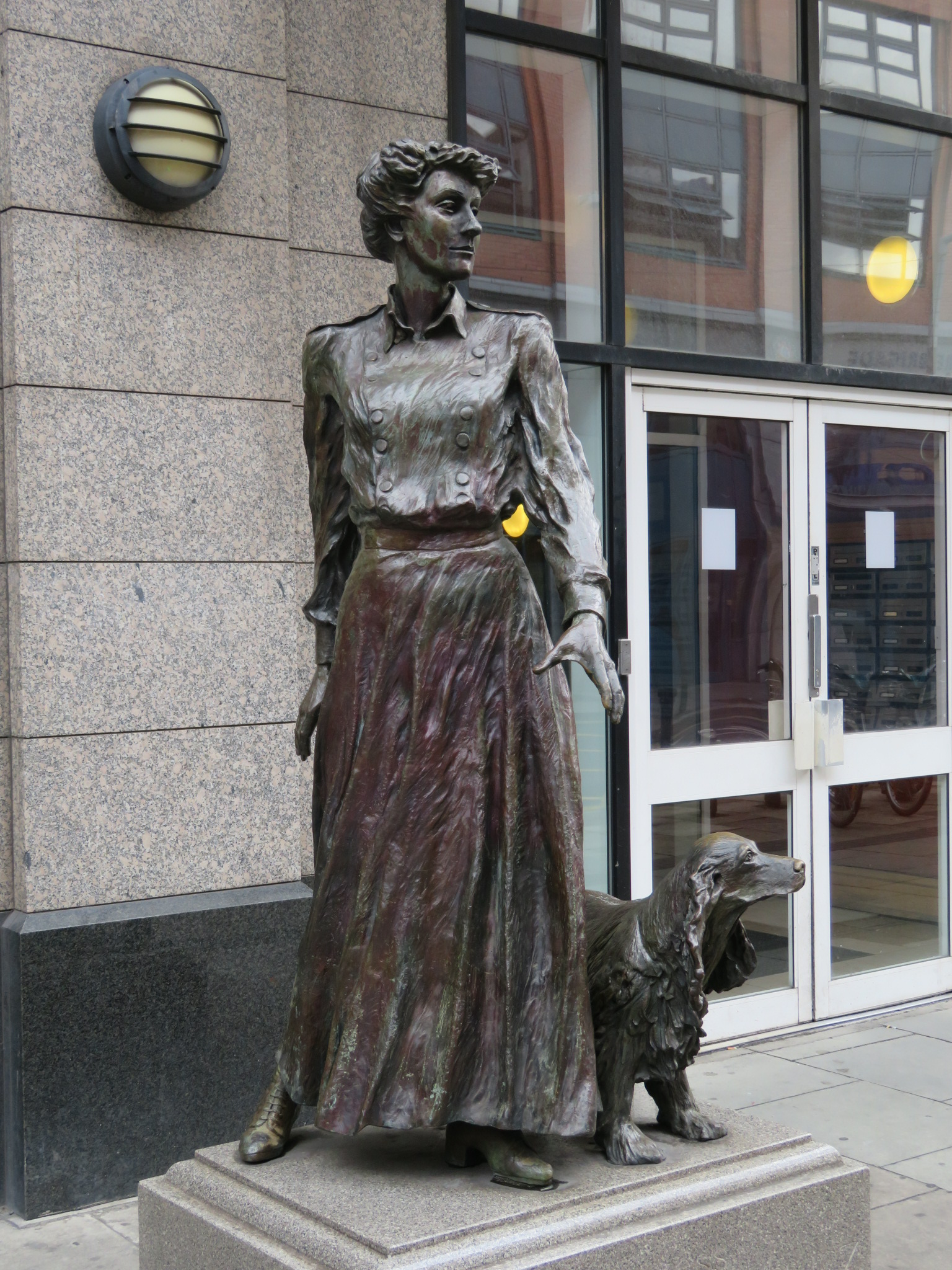
Sculpture of Markievicz and her cocker spaniel, Poppet, on Townsend Street, Dublin by Elizabeth McLaughlin

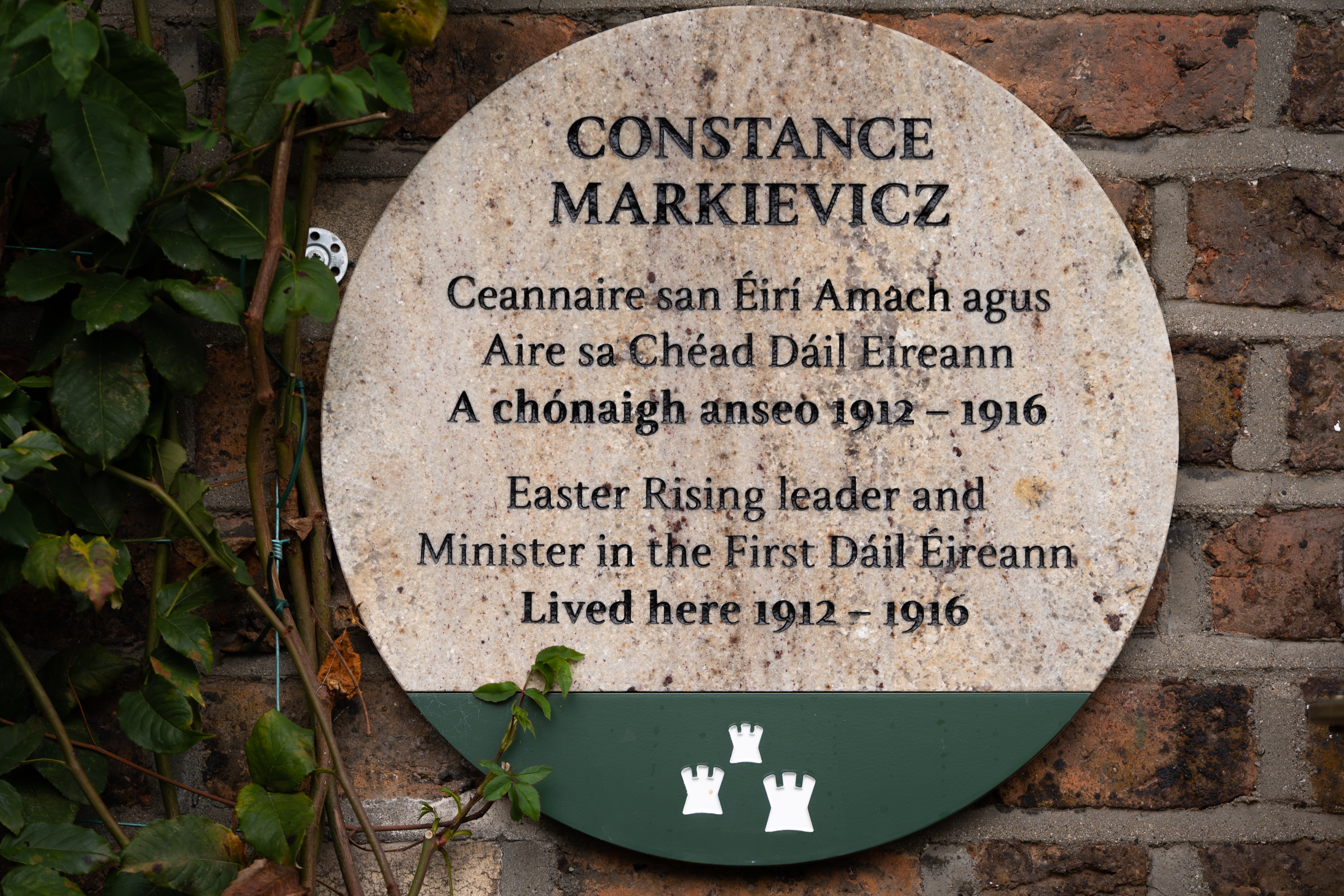
A Dublin City Council 1916 Commemorative plaque, unveiled on 15 July 2019, to commemorate Constance Markievicz and the house she lived in from 1912 to 1916

The bust of Constance Markievicz in St Stephen's Green in Dublin.

== Notes ==
Parliament of the United Kingdom
Preceded by William Field	Member of Parliament for Dublin St Patrick's; 1918–1922	Constituency abolished
Oireachtas
New constituency	Teachta Dála for Dublin St Patrick's; 1918–1921	Constituency abolished
Political offices
New office	Minister for Labour; 1919–1922	Succeeded by Joseph McGrath

Dáil	Election	Deputy (Party)	Deputy (Party)	Deputy (Party)	Deputy (Party)	Deputy (Party)	Deputy (Party)	Deputy (Party)
2nd	1921	Thomas Kelly (SF)	Daniel McCarthy (SF)	Constance Markievicz (SF)	Cathal Ó Murchadha (SF)	4 seats 1921–1923		
3rd	1922	Thomas Kelly (PT-SF)	Daniel McCarthy (PT-SF)	William O'Brien (Lab)	Myles Keogh (Ind.)	4 seats 1921–1923		
4th	1923	Philip Cosgrave (CnaG)	Daniel McCarthy (CnaG)	Constance Markievicz (Rep)	Myles Keogh (Ind.)	Cathal Ó Murchadha (Rep)	Michael Hayes (CnaG)	Peadar Doyle (CnaG)
4th	1923 by-election	Philip Cosgrave (CnaG)	Daniel McCarthy (CnaG)	Constance Markievicz (Rep)	Myles Keogh (Ind.)	Cathal Ó Murchadha (Rep)	Hugh Kennedy (CnaG)	Peadar Doyle (CnaG)
4th	March 1924 by-election	James O'Mara (CnaG)	Daniel McCarthy (CnaG)	Constance Markievicz (Rep)	Myles Keogh (Ind.)	Cathal Ó Murchadha (Rep)	Hugh Kennedy (CnaG)	Peadar Doyle (CnaG)
4th	November 1924 by-election	James O'Mara (CnaG)	Daniel McCarthy (CnaG)	Constance Markievicz (Rep)	Myles Keogh (Ind.)	Cathal Ó Murchadha (Rep)	Seán Lemass (SF)	Peadar Doyle (CnaG)
4th	1925 by-election	James O'Mara (CnaG)	Thomas Hennessy (CnaG)	Constance Markievicz (Rep)	Myles Keogh (Ind.)	Cathal Ó Murchadha (Rep)	Seán Lemass (SF)	Peadar Doyle (CnaG)
5th	1927 (Jun)	James Beckett (CnaG)	Vincent Rice (NL)	Constance Markievicz (FF)	Myles Keogh (Ind.)	Thomas Lawlor (Lab)	Seán Lemass (FF)	Peadar Doyle (CnaG)
5th	1927 by-election	James Beckett (CnaG)	Vincent Rice (NL)	Thomas Hennessy (CnaG)	Myles Keogh (Ind.)	Thomas Lawlor (Lab)	Seán Lemass (FF)	Peadar Doyle (CnaG)
6th	1927 (Sep)	James Beckett (CnaG)	Robert Briscoe (FF)	Thomas Hennessy (CnaG)	Myles Keogh (CnaG)	Frank Kerlin (FF)	Seán Lemass (FF)	Peadar Doyle (CnaG)
7th	1932	James Beckett (CnaG)	Robert Briscoe (FF)	Thomas Hennessy (CnaG)	Myles Keogh (CnaG)	James Lynch (FF)	Seán Lemass (FF)	Peadar Doyle (CnaG)
8th	1933	James Beckett (CnaG)	Robert Briscoe (FF)	James McGuire (CnaG)	Thomas Kelly (FF)	James Lynch (FF)	Seán Lemass (FF)	Peadar Doyle (CnaG)
9th	1937	Myles Keogh (FG)	Robert Briscoe (FF)	Thomas Lawlor (Lab)	Thomas Kelly (FF)	Joseph Hannigan (Ind.)	Seán Lemass (FF)	Peadar Doyle (FG)
10th	1938	James Beckett (FG)	Robert Briscoe (FF)	James Lynch (FF)	Thomas Kelly (FF)	Joseph Hannigan (Ind.)	Seán Lemass (FF)	Peadar Doyle (FG)
10th	1939 by-election	John McCann (FF)	Robert Briscoe (FF)	James Lynch (FF)	Thomas Kelly (FF)	Joseph Hannigan (Ind.)	Seán Lemass (FF)	Peadar Doyle (FG)
11th	1943	Maurice Dockrell (FG)	Robert Briscoe (FF)	James Lynch (FF)	James Larkin Jnr (Lab)	John McCann (FF)	Seán Lemass (FF)	Peadar Doyle (FG)
12th	1944	Maurice Dockrell (FG)	Robert Briscoe (FF)	James Lynch (FF)	James Larkin Jnr (Lab)	John McCann (FF)	Seán Lemass (FF)	Peadar Doyle (FG)
13th	1948	Constituency abolished. See Dublin South-Central, Dublin South-East and Dublin South-West.						

Dáil	Election	Deputy (Party)	Deputy (Party)	Deputy (Party)	Deputy (Party)	Deputy (Party)
22nd	1981	Niall Andrews (FF)	Séamus Brennan (FF)	Nuala Fennell (FG)	John Kelly (FG)	Alan Shatter (FG)
23rd	1982 (Feb)	Niall Andrews (FF)	Séamus Brennan (FF)	Nuala Fennell (FG)	John Kelly (FG)	Alan Shatter (FG)
24th	1982 (Nov)	Niall Andrews (FF)	Séamus Brennan (FF)	Nuala Fennell (FG)	John Kelly (FG)	Alan Shatter (FG)
25th	1987	Tom Kitt (FF)	Séamus Brennan (FF)	Anne Colley (PDs)	John Kelly (FG)	Alan Shatter (FG)
26th	1989	Tom Kitt (FF)	Séamus Brennan (FF)	Nuala Fennell (FG)	Roger Garland (GP)	Alan Shatter (FG)
27th	1992	Tom Kitt (FF)	Séamus Brennan (FF)	Liz O'Donnell (PDs)	Eithne FitzGerald (Lab)	Alan Shatter (FG)
28th	1997	Tom Kitt (FF)	Séamus Brennan (FF)	Liz O'Donnell (PDs)	Olivia Mitchell (FG)	Alan Shatter (FG)
29th	2002	Tom Kitt (FF)	Séamus Brennan (FF)	Liz O'Donnell (PDs)	Olivia Mitchell (FG)	Eamon Ryan (GP)
30th	2007	Tom Kitt (FF)	Séamus Brennan (FF)	Alan Shatter (FG)	Olivia Mitchell (FG)	Eamon Ryan (GP)
30th	2009 by-election	Tom Kitt (FF)	George Lee (FG)	Alan Shatter (FG)	Olivia Mitchell (FG)	Eamon Ryan (GP)
31st	2011	Shane Ross (Ind.)	Peter Mathews (FG)	Alan Shatter (FG)	Olivia Mitchell (FG)	Alex White (Lab)
32nd	2016	Constituency abolished. See Dublin Rathdown, Dublin South-West and Dún Laoghaire.				
