= Standing Council of Irish Chiefs and Chieftains =

Organisation in Ireland

Standing Council of Irish Chiefs
- Buanchomhairle Thaoisigh Éireann
- Formation: 1991
- Type: Gaelic nobility Irish clans Gaelic culture
- Headquarters: Ireland

The Standing Council of Irish Chiefs and Chieftains (Irish: Buanchomhairle Thaoisigh Éireann) is an organisation which was established to bring together claimants to be surviving Chiefs of the Name from the Gaelic nobility of Ireland.

== Issues ==
As a republic, the Constitution of Ireland prohibits the conferral of "titles of nobility" by the Republic of Ireland, or their acceptance without permission of the Government; further, Irish chieftainships did not descend by primogeniture but by election from within kinship pools.

== History ==
=== Courtesy recognitions ===
On 5 October 1991, sixteen of the nineteen claimant "bloodline chiefs" were received at Áras an Uachtaráin by the President of Ireland, Mary Robinson, along with the Chief Herald of Ireland and representation from the Irish Tourist Board.

Maguire of Fermanagh, retired accountant Terence Maguire, was elected chairman of the first council, while the O'Conor Don of Roscommon, retired businessman Denis O'Conor Don, was elected deputy-chairman.

=== Cessation of recognitions ===
Following a scandal in 1999, the Chief Herald of Ireland took advice from the Attorney General's Office that successions would no longer be given "courtesy recognition" or published in the Iris Oifigiúil. While some representatives had obtained courtesy recognition as Chiefs of the Name from the Chief Herald of Ireland, this practice was discontinued by 2003 – when the Attorney General noted that such recognitions in a Republican system were unconstitutional and without basis in Irish law.

=== Later activities ===
As of 2006, the chair of the Standing Council of Irish Chiefs and Chieftains was Dr. Hugo Ricciardi O'Neill, the ostensible head of the Clandeboye O'Neill dynasty, from a branch of that family which has been in Portugal since the 18th century.

The council issues an annual prize, for essay writing, in association with Trinity College Dublin.

== See also ==
- David O'Morchoe (1928–2019), a lifetime member and former chairman of the council.
- Standing Council of Scottish Chiefs
