= In Memory of Eva Gore-Booth and Con Markiewicz =

1933 poem by William Butler Yeats

"In Memory of Eva Gore-Booth and Con Markiewicz" is a poem in two stanzas by William Butler Yeats, written in 1927 and published in his 1933 collection The Winding Stair and Other Poems.

Eva Gore-Booth and Constance Markiewicz (née Gore-Booth) were two sisters who lived at Lissadell House in County Sligo. Eva died in 1926 and Constance (Con) in 1927. The young Yeats had been encouraged by them and entranced by their beauty. They are remembered in the poem as "Two girls in silk kimonos, both / beautiful, one a gazelle." Both later became involved in Irish nationalist politics, and Constance was sentenced to death for her part in the Easter Rising of 1916, though the sentence was subsequently commuted. Eva later became active in the Women's suffrage movement in Manchester, England.

In the poem, Yeats laments the loss, not only of their physical beauty, but of their spiritual beauty – their later politics were far removed from the romantic ideal of Ireland that he had had in their youth. The second stanza speaks of the futility of their struggle, both his and the sisters', when the real enemy is time itself: "The innocent and the beautiful / have no enemy but time."
