= Denis Maurice O'Conor =

Irish barrister and Liberal Party politician

Denis Maurice O'Conor (Irish: Donnchadh Muirgheas Ó Conchubhair Donn; 24 July 1840 – 26 July 1883) was an Irish barrister and Liberal Party politician who represented County Sligo in the House of Commons.

The second son of Denis O'Conor, O'Conor Don and the brother of Charles Owen O'Conor, O'Conor Don, Denis Maurice O'Conor was educated at Downside School and the University of London, graduating MA in 1861 and LLD in 1866. He was called to the bar by the Middle Temple in Easter Term, 1866. A magistrate for County Roscommon, he was High Sheriff of Roscommon for 1865.

A Liberal and a Home Ruler, O'Conor represented County Sligo in the House of Commons from December 1868 until his death.

== Personal life ==
On the 5 August 1873 he married Ellen Isabella, the eldest daughter of Rev. William Trevelyan Kevill-Davies of Croft Castle, Herefordshire by his wife Ellen, daughter of Matthew O'Brien of Newcastle, Co. Limerick and had issue;

- Charles William O'Conor (b. 17 Dec 1878 - d. 13 May 1963); who married Evelyn Lowry-Corry daughter of Admiral Hon. Armar Lowry-Corry (second son of Armar Lowry-Corry, 3rd Earl Belmore) by his wife Geraldine, daughter of James King King of Staunton Park, Herefordshire and had issue;
  - Denis Armar O'Conor, O'Conor Don (b. 13 Jan 1912 - d. 10 Jul 2000)
  - Roderic Charles O'Conor (b. 12 Aug 1913 - d. 6 Apr 1985)

He died on 26 July 1883 at age 43 at his residence in 110 Queen's Gate, Kensington.

== Ancestry ==
Ancestors of Denis Maurice O'Conor

8.Denis O'Conor of Bellanagare Castle
4.Owen O'Conor, O'Conor Don
9. Catherine Browne
2.Denis O'Conor, O'Conor Don
10. Edward Moore Esq of Mount Browne, Dublin
5. Jane Moore
11. Jane Reynolds
1. Denis Maurice O'Conor
12. Isidore Blake Esq of Towerhill House, Co. Mayo
6. Major Maurice Blake of Towerhill house, Co. Roscommon
13. Frances Ruttledge
3. Mary Blake
14. Valentine O'Connor of Dublin
7. Maria O'Connor
15. Mary Moore

Parliament of the United Kingdom
Preceded by Edward Henry Cooper; Sir Robert Gore-Booth	Member of Parliament for County Sligo; 1868 – 1883; With: Sir Robert Gore-Booth to 1877; Edward Robert King-Harman 1877–80; Thomas Sexton from 1880	Succeeded by Nicholas Lynch; Thomas Sexton
