= Gore baronets =

Baronetcy in the Baronetage of Ireland

There have been three baronetcies created for members of the Gore family, all in the Baronetage of Ireland. All three titles are extant. The family also holds two earldoms and a barony.

== Gore baronets of Magherabegg (1622) ==
Arms of Gore of Magherabegg: Gules, a fesse between three cross-crosslets fitchée or, a canton of a baronet. The same arms without the canton are borne by the Earl of Arran.

The Gore Baronetcy, of Magherabegg (or Manor Gore) in the County of Donegal, was created in the Baronetage of Ireland on 2 February 1622 for Paul Gore (shown also as 1st baronet of Manor Gore, the Anglicised version). The fourth Baronet served as Chancellor of the Irish Exchequer and as Speaker of the Irish House of Commons. The fifth Baronet represented County Donegal in the Irish Parliament. The sixth Baronet was a prominent military commander. In 1764 he was raised to the peerage as Baron Gore, of Manor Gore in the County of Donegal, and in 1768 he was further created Viscount Belleisle, of Belleisle, in the County of Fermanagh. In 1772 he was further honoured when he was made Earl of Ross, in the County of Fermanagh. All three titles were in the Peerage of Ireland. However, Lord Ross had no surviving male issue and the peerages became extinct on his death in 1802, while the baronetcy passed to his nephew. The present holder of the baronetcy lives in Australia.

- Sir Paul Gore, 1st Baronet (died 1629)
- Sir Ralph Gore, 2nd Baronet (died c. 1651)
- Sir William Gore, 3rd Baronet (died c. 1703)
- Sir Ralph Gore, 4th Baronet (died 1733)
- Sir St George Gore-St George, 5th Baronet (1722–1746)
- Sir Ralph Gore, 6th Baronet (1725–1802) (created 1st Earl of Ross in 1772)
- Sir Ralph Gore, 7th Baronet (1758–1842)
- Sir St George Gore, 8th Baronet (1811–1878)
- Sir St George Ralph Gore, 9th Baronet (1841–1887)
- Sir Ralph St George Claude Gore, 10th Baronet (1877–1961)
- Sir Ralph St George Brian Gore, 11th Baronet (1908–1973)
- Sir St George Ralph Gore, 12th Baronet (1914–1973)
- Sir Richard Ralph St.George Gore, 13th Baronet (1954–1993)
- Sir Nigel Hugh St George Gore, 14th Baronet (1922–2008)
- Sir Hugh Frederick Corbet Gore, 15th Baronet (1934–2022)
- Sir Timothy Milton Corbet Gore, 16th baronet (born 1969).

The heir presumptive is the present's cousin William Ralph St John Gore (born 1952), then his only son Ralph St John Edmund Gore (born 1985).

== Gore baronets of Newtown (1662) ==
(Earls of Arran since 1762)

The Gore Baronetcy, of Newtown in the County of Mayo, was created in the Baronetage of Ireland on 10 April 1662 for Arthur Gore. He was the 2nd son of the 1st Baronet (1622 creation). His great-grandson and namesake, the 3rd Baronet, was in 1762 elevated to the peerage as Earl of Arran.

A notable family member was Cecilia Underwood, Duchess of Inverness. She was born Lady Cecilia Letitia Gore (c. 1785–1873) and was the illegally married second wife of Prince Augustus Frederick, Duke of Sussex, a younger son of King George III.

The family is currently represented by Arthur Gore, 9th Earl of Arran (born 1938). His heir presumptive is currently William Henry Gore(born 1950), a distant cousin.

- Sir Arthur Gore, 1st Baronet (died 1697)
- Sir Arthur Gore, 2nd Baronet (c.1685-1741/1742)
- Sir Arthur Gore, 3rd Baronet (1703–1773), created Earl of Arran 12 April 1762/ 1760

== Gore, later Gore-Booth, of Artarman (1760) ==
The Gore, later Gore-Booth Baronetcy, of Artarman in the County of Sligo, was created in the Baronetage of Ireland on 30 August 1760 for Booth Gore, descendant of Sir Francis Gore, 4th son of the 1st Baronet (1622 creation). He married Lætitia, daughter and heiress of Humphrey Booth.

The family has a common origin with the Earl of Arran, Earl Temple of Stowe, Baron Harlech, the Gore baronets of 1622 creation, and the ancient Booth baronets.

In 1804 the 3rd baronet assumed the additional surname and arms of Booth by Royal Licence. The 4th Baronet represented County Sligo in the British House of Commons for many years. The Irish nationalist Constance Markievicz, was born the daughter of the 5th baronet Sir Henry Gore-Booth of this branch.

The family seat was Lissadell House, near Carney, County Sligo.

- Sir Booth Gore, 1st Baronet (1712–1773)
- Sir Booth Gore, 2nd Baronet (died 1804)
- Sir Robert Newcomen Gore-Booth, 3rd Baronet (died 1814)
- Sir Robert Gore-Booth, 4th Baronet (1805–1876)
- Sir Henry William Gore-Booth, 5th Baronet (1843–1900)
- Sir Josslyn Augustus Richard Gore-Booth, 6th Baronet (1869–1944)
- Sir Michael Savile Gore-Booth, 7th Baronet (1908–1987)
- Sir Angus Josslyn Gore-Booth, 8th Baronet (1920–1996)
- Sir Josslyn Henry Robert Gore-Booth, 9th Baronet (born 1950)

The heir presumptive is the present holder's second cousin once removed Paul Wyatt Julian Gore-Booth (born 1968). His heir apparent is his son Dominic Peter Gore-Booth (born 2004).

== Other branches, including Earls Temple of Stowe and Lords Harlech ==
Several other members of the Gore family have also gained prominence and higher ranks. Sir John Gore, brother of the first Baronet of the 1622 creation, was Lord Mayor of London in 1624 and is the ancestor of the branch of the family which later inherited through marriage the earldom of Temple of Stowe. His descendants are now Earls Temple of Stowe.

John Gore, 1st Baron Annaly (first creation) (1718–1784), and Henry Gore, 1st Baron Annaly (second creation) (1728–1793), were the sons of George Gore, second son of the first Baronet of the 1662 creation. These titles, created as Baron Annaly of Tenelick, in the county of Longford, were created 1766 and 1789 for two brothers who died childless; both titles are now extinct.

John Ormsby-Gore, 1st Baron Harlech, was a descendant of William Gore, the third and youngest son of the first Baronet of the 1662 creation. His descendants are now Lords Harlech.

== See also ==
- Baron Annaly
- Earl of Arran (Ireland) (1762 creation)
- Baron Harlech
- Earl Temple of Stowe
- Constance Markievicz
