= Custos Rotulorum of Sligo =

The Custos Rotulorum of Sligo was the highest civil officer in County Sligo during the British administration of the country.

== Incumbents ==
- 1789-1841 Owen Wynne

For later custodes rotulorum, see Lord Lieutenant of Sligo
