= Temple House Manor and Castle =

Irish Georgian mansion and ruined castle

Coordinates: 54.117100°N 8.574700°W

Temple House is a Georgian mansion set in an estate of over 1,000 acres (400 ha). It overlooks the lakeside ruins of a castle formerly of the Knights Templar, and is now a country guest house. Originally built c. 1825, it was substantially extended and embellished c. 1864.

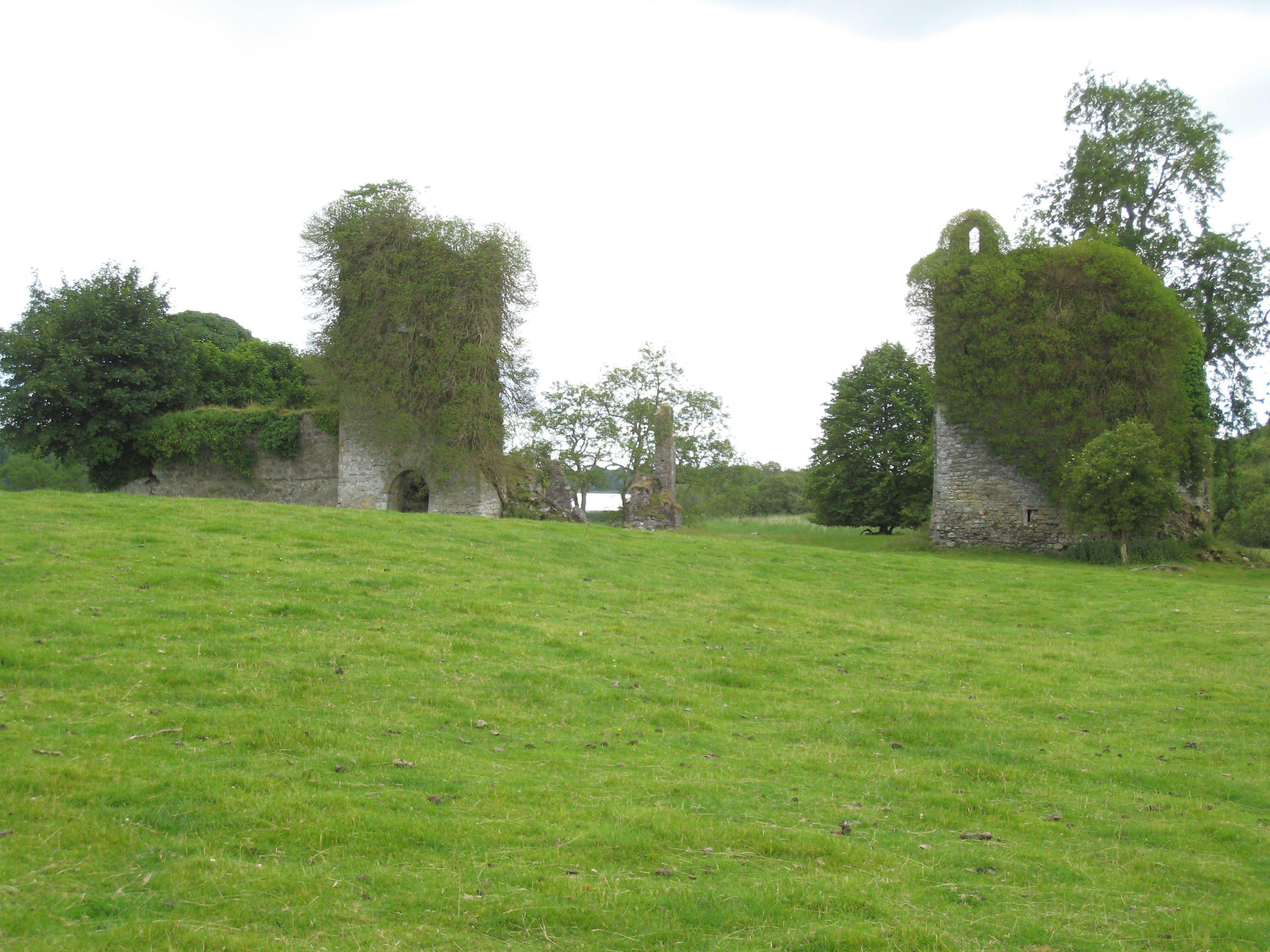
The castle today

Templehouse Castle (Irish: Caisleán) was a rectangular keepless castle, built in 1181 near the townland of Ballinacarrow on the outskirts of Ballymote in south County Sligo, Ireland.

== History ==
The Temple House lands were granted to the Knights Templar in 1216 and passed to the Knights Hospitaller when the Templars were disbanded in 1311. The castle was converted to a domestic residence in 1627 and besieged and badly damaged in 1641.

The Perceval family has lived on the lands since 1665. George Perceval (1635–75) had settled in Ireland on acquiring the Temple House property by marriage to an heiress of the Crofton family of Longford House, Colooney. The property passed down in the Perceval family, several of whom were High Sheriffs of Sligo until it descended to Colonel Alexander Perceval (1787–1858) who was MP for County Sligo in the UK Parliament and Sergeant-at-Arms in the House of Lords. He rebuilt the previous Gothic house c.1825. He however spent too extravagantly and on his death the house had to be sold, but was bought back for the family by Alexander's third son, also Alexander, who had made a fortune in China. Alexander jnr then enhanced the building c.1864 by adding a 7-bay block at right angles to the existing 5-bay block.

In 1920, the house was attacked by the IRA, seriously injuring the wife of the then owner, Major Alexander Perceval.

The house, filled with heirlooms, is a family home which provides tourist accommodation.
