= Sir Henry Gore-Booth, 5th Baronet =

Anglo-Irish adventurer (1843-1900)

Sir Henry William Gore-Booth 5th Baronet
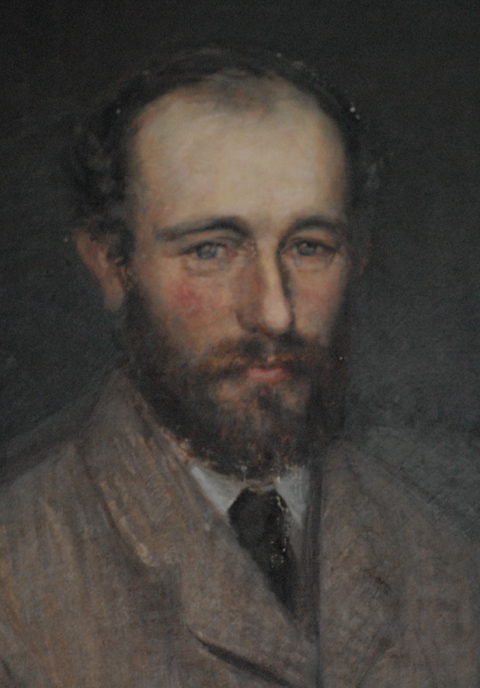
- Sir Henry Gore-Booth
- Born: 1 July 1843; Lissadell House, County Sligo, Ireland
- Died: 13 January 1900 (aged 56); St. Moritz, Switzerland
- Spouse: Georgina May Hill (m. 1867)
- Issue: Constance Markievicz; Sir Josslyn Augustus Richard Gore-Booth, 6th Baronet; Eva Gore-Booth; Mabel Gore-Booth; Mordaunt Gore-Booth
- Father: Sir Robert Gore-Booth, 4th Baronet
- Occupation: Arctic explorer

Sir Henry William Gore-Booth, 5th Baronet (1 July 1843 – 13 January 1900), was an Anglo-Irish Arctic explorer, landowner and landlord.

== Early life and education ==
Gore-Booth was born on 1 July 1843 at Lissadell House, County Sligo to Sir Robert Gore-Booth, 4th Baronet, an Anglo-Irish politician and landowner, and Caroline Susan Gore-Booth (née Goold). One of five siblings, Gore-Booth's older brother Robert drowned in 1861 whilst the two were boating in Drumcliff Bay. Gore-Booth was educated at Eton College.

== Career ==
Following the death of his father in 1876, Gore-Booth became the 5th Baronet of Artarman and took over the running of the family estate. A member of the Anglo-Irish ruling-class, Gore-Booth was appointed the High Sheriff of Sligo during 1872 (Note: Also cited as 1871.) and also as the served as the deputy lieutenant and justice of the peace for Sligo. A partner in Gleniff Mine, which employed many of his tenants, Gore-Booth also served as the chairman of the Sligo, Leitrim and Northern Counties Railway and was the President of the Sligo Agricultural Society.

Gore-Booth reportedly held the reputation as a popular and benevolent landlord, and by 1879 had reduced most of his rents to the Griffith's Valuation figure. During the Irish Famine of 1879, Gore-Booth reinstated the Carney and Drumcliffe Relief Committees and provided free food donations to his tenants.

=== Arctic exploration ===
Between 1864 and 1866, Gore-Booth accompanied Arthur MacMurrough Kavanagh on three sailing, fishing and shooting trips to Norway. In 1879, Gore-Booth accompanied Lars Jorgensen and Albert Hastings Markham on a surveying expedition around the Novaya Zemlya archipelago on the Norwegian schooner Isbjörn. Reaching their highest latitude of 78° 24’ N south of Franz Josef Land, the expedition passed through the Matochkin Shar to the Kara Sea. The expedition surveyed the coast, the drift of ice flow and collected natural history specimens as well as participating in hunting and fishing.

In 1882, Gore-Booth participated in the search party and rescue of fellow Arctic explorer Benjamin Leigh Smith and his crew. Gore-Booth set sail in early June for Novaya Zemlya on his yacht Kara, which he had found under construction in Wivenhoe and had lanking doubled and the bows reinforced with iron. On 2 July 1886, Gore-Booth was awarded a Master certificate for Kara by the Board of Trade. Much of Gore-Booth's Arctic memorabilia is on display in The Billiard Room of Lissadell House.

Sir Henry was also a prolific writer on a variety of topics including Arctic exploration, yachting, whaling, polar bear hunting and shark fishing.

== Personal life ==
In 1867, Gore-Booth married Georgina Mary Gore-Booth (née Hill), the founder of the Lissadell School of needlework and daughter of Colonel Charles Hill of Tickhill Castle. The couple had five children, including the republican and labour activist Constance Markievicz and Eva Gore-Booth, a poet and suffragist. Gore-Booth was the grandfather of the diplomat Paul Gore-Booth, Baron Gore-Booth.

On 13 January 1900, Gore-Booth died from influenza whilst holidaying in St. Moritz, Switzerland. Gore-Booth was buried at the churchyard of Lissadell Church, County Sligo.

== Notes ==
Baronetage of Ireland
Preceded by Robert Gore-Booth	Baronet (of Artarman); 1876 – 1900	Succeeded by Josslyn Augustus; Richard Gore-Booth
