= Nicholas Lynch (politician) =

Irish banker and MP (1827 - 1900)

Member of Parliament for County Sligo
- In office 1883-1885

Personal details
- Born: 1827 Dublin, Ireland
- Died: 29 July 1900 (aged 72–73) Dublin, Ireland
- Party: Irish Parliamentary Party

Nicholas Lynch (1827-29 July 1900) was an Irish politician and businessman who served as Member of Parliament for County Sligo in 1883–1885, as a member of the Irish Parliamentary Party.

== Life ==
Lynch was born in Dublin in 1827, the son of Thomas Lynch.

Lynch was elected to represent Sligo in August 1883 following the death of the incumbent, Denis Maurice O'Conor, with 1545 votes against 983 for the Conservative candidate. He did not stand for re-election in 1885, when the county was split into two seats. Tim Healy characterised Lynch in his memoirs as "a wealthy man, who, on the hustings or in the House of Commons, was unable to open his mouth".

Lynch was a director of the Hibernian Bank, and following the default of the Munster Bank in 1885 successfully mobilised the Irish Parliamentary Party to move in support of the Hibernian by threatening to arrange a boycott of Bank of Ireland notes, with what Healy noted as an " eloquent and moving" speech to the Party meeting. He resigned his directorship of the Hibernian Bank in 1886.

In his later years he was not politically active. He died in Rathmines, Dublin on 29 July 1900. He left bequests of around £20,000 to charitable causes, primarily religious and educational institutions in Dublin.
