= Denis O'Conor Don =

Hereditary Chief of the Name in Ireland

Denis Armar O'Conor, O'Conor Don (Irish: Donnchadh Ó Conchubhair Donn; 1912–10 July 2000) was hereditary Chief of the Name O'Conor, and a direct descendant of Tairrdelbach Ua Conchobair, the last High King of Ireland with a surviving male-line lineage, and was seen by some as a nominal claimant to that defunct position.

== Early years and family ==
Denis Armar O'Conor was born in London in January 1912. His father, Charles William O'Conor, the son of Denis Maurice O'Conor (younger son of Denis O'Conor, O'Conor Don), and Ellen Isabella Kevill-Davies daughter of Rev. William Trevalyan Kevill-Davies of Croft Castle. His father was the nephew of Charles Owen O'Conor, O'Conor Don. Charles William lived at Ashley Moor house near the village of Orleton and close to his mothers childhood home at Croft Castle in Herefordshire.

His mother, Evelyn Lowry-Corry, was the daughter of Admiral Hon. Armar Lowry-Corry, (a younger son of the Armar Lowry-Corry, 3rd Earl Belmore) and Geraldine King-King daughter of James King King of Staunton Park House, Herefordshire. His grandmother Geraldine was also a niece of Lieutenant General Colin MacKenzie.

The young Denis won a classical bursary to Downside where he was captain of boxing.

== Life ==
He went to the Royal Military Academy Sandhurst in 1930. He continued to box there and was also noted for his horsemanship, originally learned from his father and honed while hunting in Ireland and Herefordshire. Despite the harsh discipline at Sandhurst, he managed to lead a hectic social life in London.

In 1931, he was commissioned to the Lincolnshire Regiment and served in India and China. India especially gave him the opportunity to hunt, play polo, go pig-sticking and shoot. He had one of the highest handicaps at polo in India and China during his time there, and played against the American army in the Philippines; in China he owned and trained horses, one of which, Kilrea, won several races in Hong Kong. A wild and spirited young man with an eye for the girls, he enjoyed Army life in the East "to the limit and often beyond".

In the Second World War, O'Conor saw action at the Battle of Dunkirk, however he saw no further action due to a training accident involving a grenade. However, he continued in the military in a training and administrative capacity. He retired with the rank of Major in 1946 and moved to live in Roundwood, County Wicklow, where his father had bought a farm. He was not well off and he abandoned farming to become a representative for a firm that sold tractors to farmers. Later he became an inspector for the Society for the Prevention of Cruelty to Animals.

Field sports were an important to him all his life. He hunted foxhounds, beagles, Otterhound and Basset Hound at various times. He was a former Master of Delgany Beagles, a popular pack among university students (whose real interest lay in courting, not hunting). He became an acknowledged expert on hounds of all types - and was asked to judge at various shows throughout Ireland and occasionally in England. His love of dogs and his way with them was legendary. In the early 1970s, he moved to Dún Laoghaire in Dublin.

O'Conor succeeded as O'Conor Don on the death in 1981 of his second cousin, Father Charles O'Conor, the former provincial of the Jesuit Order in Ireland. Whereas the Jesuits in their austere way had insisted that Fr. O'Conor not call himself O'Conor Don, Denis O'Conor acclaimed the title with relish, and enjoyed its prerogatives to the full. However, Denis was not to inherit the family estate of Clonalis outside Castlerea, County Roscommon.

He became chairman of historical and genealogical societies, a regular presiding presence at community events and was even involved in tourist promotion. He was founding member of the Council of Irish Chieftains, consisting of the descendants of the few princely families whose pedigrees have been authenticated by the Chief Herald of Ireland.

He used his position to promote an interest in Irish heritage from genealogy, local history to archaeology. He became president of the Dún Laoghaire Genealogical Society in 1991 and President of the Genealogical Society of Ireland in 1999. He was also deputy chairman of the Standing Council of Irish Chiefs and Chieftains.

Because he was divorced, O'Conor was precluded from following the family tradition of becoming a member of the Order of Malta but he joined and eventually became Grand Prior of the Irish priory of the Oecumenical Order of St Lazarus of Jerusalem, which contributes to the relief of leprosy. His also taught disabled children to ride.

== Personal life ==
He married, in 1936, Elizabeth Marris, daughter of Rev. Stanley Punshon Marris, and had issue:

- Desmond Roderic O'Conor (b. 22 September 1938), a banker, formerly of Schroders and then regional director of Kleinwort Benson for South America, who was married on 23 May 1964 to Virginia Williams, daughter of British diplomat Michael S. Williams and had issue;
  - Emma Joy O'Conor (b.17 Apr 1965)
  - Philip Hugh O'Conor (b. 17 Feb 1967), married Rebecca Eagan daughter of Michael Francis Eagan on the 3 April 1993 and had issue;
    - Eochy Jack O'Conor (b. 28 Dec 1993)
    - Piers Montgomery O'Conor (b. 28 Aug 1995)
    - Adelaide Grace O'Conor (b. 24 Jul 1998)
    - Barley Josh O'Conor (b. 5 Sep 2006)
  - Denise Sarah O'Conor (b. 8 Dec 1970)

Denis O'Conor's marriage to Elizabeth did not long outlast the birth of their only son. Elizabeth subsequently married James Cameron.

In 1943, O'Conor married Rosemary O'Connell-Hewett, daughter of former Indian Army officer Capt. James Pearse Bowen O'Connell-Hewett, and a direct descendant of Daniel O'Connell, the 19th-century Irish Liberator, through his daughter Ellen O'Connell, by his wife Marion Barclay-Brown daughter of Kenneth Barclay-Brown of Barnes, London, and had a daughter and two sons.

- Gail O'Conor (b.1943 - d.1957), died aged thirteen.
- Dr. Kieran Denis O'Conor (b. 28 October 1958), a senior lecturer in Archaeology at the University of Galway, who was married on 26 August 1988 to Karena Mary Morton, daughter of Roderick Morton of Ranelagh, Dublin by his wife Teresa Winifred O'Shee daughter of J. J. O'Shee and had issue;
  - Eoin Roderic O'Conor (b. 14 Mar 1992); who was married on 27 April 2024 to Susannah Madeleine Jane Cooke, daughter of Hon. Michael John Alexander Cooke (Son of Alec Cooke, Baron Cooke of Islandreagh) by his wife Anne Helen Madeleine Armstrong daughter of Michael Armstrong of Dean's hill house, County Armagh.
    - Rory Felim Michael O'Conor (b. 19 September 2025)
  - Hugh Armar O'Conor (b. 6 Apr 1996)
- Rory Dominic O'Conor (b. 1 January 1963), who was married on 21 August 1999 to Cecilia Emily Gleeson daughter of David Gleeson.

=== Death and legacy ===
The O'Conor Don died on 10 July 2000 aged 88 and was buried at the family plot at St. Joseph's Cemetery in Castlerea on the edge of the family estate. His eldest son, Desmond, who lives in Sussex, succeeded as O'Conor Don.

== Ancestry ==
Ancestors of Denis O'Conor Don

16. Owen O'Conor, O'Conor Don
8. Denis O'Conor
17. Jane Moore daughter of Edward Moore of Mount Browne, County Dublin
4. Denis Maurice O'Conor
18. Major Maurice Blake of Towerhill house, County Mayo
9. Mary Blake of Tower Hill
19. Maria O'Connor daughter of Valentine O'Connor
2. Charles William O'Conor
20. Rev. James Kevill
10. Rev. William Trevelyan Kevill-Davies Esq of Croft Castle
21. Anne Isabella Davies daughter of Somerset Davies of Wigmore Hall, Herefordshire and Croft Castle, Herefordshire
5. Ellen Isabella Kevill-Davies
22. Matthew O'Brien of Newcastle, Co Limerick
11. Ellen Martha O'Brien
23. Sophia Richards daughter of Solomon Richards esq of Solsborough house, County Wexford
1. Denis Armar O'Conor Don
24.Somerset Lowry-Corry, 2nd Earl Belmore
12. Armar Lowry-Corry, 3rd Earl Belmore
25.Lady Juliana Butler daughter of Henry Butler, 2nd Earl of Carrick
6. Admiral Hon. Armar Lowry Corry RN
26. William Shephard of Brabourne Manor, Kent
13. Emily Louise Shepard
27. Anne Lovel Dawson daughter of Thomas Dawson Esq of Edwardstown Hall, Suffolk
3. Evelyn Lowry Corry
28. Rev. James Simpkinson King of Staunton Park, Herefordshire
14. James King King of Staunton Park
29. Emma Vaux daughter of Edward Vaux of Eaton house, Middlesex
7. Geraldine King-King
30.Kenneth Francis Mackenzie
15. Mary Cochrane Mackenzie
31. Anne Townshend

== Descent from High King of Ireland ==
Denis O'Conor Don is reputedly descended from the High King of Ireland via the following line of descent:

- Denis O'Conor Don
- Charles William O'Conor
- Denis Maurice O'Conor
- Denis O'Conor Don
- Owen O'Conor, O'Conor Don
- Denis O'Conor
- Charles O'Conor
- Denis O'Conor
- Cathal Oge O'Conor
- Cathal O'Conor
- Sir Hugh O'Conor Don
- Dermod O'Conor Don
- Carbery O'Conor, O'Conor Don
- Owen Ceach O'Conor, O'Conor Don
- Fedlim Geancach Ó Conchobair Donn, King of Connacht
- Toirdhealbhach Óg Donn Ó Conchobair, King of Connacht
- Aedh mac Tairdelbach Ó Conchobair, King of Connacht
- Toirdelbach Ó Conchobair, King of Connacht
- Hugh O'Conor, King of Connacht
- Eoghan MacRuaidrí O'Conor
- Ruaidrí MacAedh O'Conor
- Hugh O'Conor, King of Connacht
- Cathal Crobhdearg O'Conor, King of Connacht
- Tairrdelbach Ua Conchobair, King of Connacht, High King of Ireland

== Distinctions ==
- Order of Saint Lazarus (statuted 1910)
