= Sir Robert Gore-Booth, 4th Baronet =

Anglo-Irish politician and landowner

Sir Robert Gore-Booth, 4th Baronet (25 August 1805 – 21 December 1876) was an Anglo-Irish politician and landowner, who built Lissadell House, located in County Sligo.

== Background and education ==
Born at Bath, Somerset, he was the son of Sir Robert Gore-Booth, 3rd Baronet and his wife Hannah, the daughter of Henry Irwin. In 1814, aged only nine, he succeeded his father as baronet. He was educated at Westminster School and went then to Queens' College, Cambridge, graduating with a Master of Arts in 1826.

== Career ==
During the period of the Great Famine, Sir Robert was accused of arbitrarily evicting starving tenant farmers from his land and packing them into leaky, overcrowded emigrant ships headed for Canada and America. However, other accounts insist that he mortgaged the estate to help feed his tenants and refused to accept any rents for the duration. Which version of events is closer to the truth is still a matter of controversy.

He was appointed High Sheriff of Sligo for 1830. In 1850 he was elected MP for County Sligo in the British House of Commons, representing the constituency for twenty-six years until his death. Having been a deputy lieutenant from 1841, he was appointed Lord Lieutenant of Sligo in 1868.

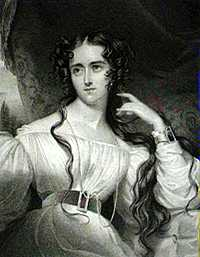
Caroline Susan Goold

== Family ==
In 1827, Gore-Booth married firstly Caroline, the second daughter of Robert King, 1st Viscount Lorton. She died a year later, and after another two years as a widower, he remarried Caroline Susan, second daughter of Thomas Goold, Serjeant-at-law (Ireland) and Elizabeth Nixon. His second wife died in 1855 and Gore-Booth survived her until his death in 1876 aged 71. He was succeeded in the baronetcy by his second son, Henry.

== Bibliography ==
- Dod, Robert P. (1860). The Peerage, Baronetage and Knightage of Great Britain and Ireland. London: Whitaker and Co.

Parliament of the United Kingdom
Preceded by William Ormsby-Gore; John Ffolliott	Member of Parliament for County Sligo; 1850–1876; With: William Ormsby-Gore 1850–1852; Richard Swift 1852–1857; Edward Joshua Cooper 1857–1859; Charles Cooper 1859–1865; Edward Henry Cooper 1865–1868; Denis O'Conor 1868–1876	Succeeded by Denis O'Conor; Edward King-Harman
Honorary titles
Preceded by Sir Francis Knox-Gore, Bt	Lord Lieutenant of Sligo; 1868–1876	Succeeded by Edward Henry Cooper
Baronetage of Ireland
Preceded by Robert Gore-Booth	Baronet (of Artarman); 1814–1876	Succeeded by Henry William Gore-Booth
