= Charles Kean O'Hara =

Irish landowner

Charles Kean O'Hara OBE JP (1860 – 7 August 1947) was a land owner and member of a distinguished family in Ireland. He served as the last Lord Lieutenant of Sligo and Custos Rotulorum from 1902 to 1922. He undertook the role of High Sheriff for County Sligo in 1886.

O'Hara was born in 1860, the son of Charles William O'Hara, MP for County Sligo. He served in the army with rank of major in 3rd Battalion Yorkshire and Lancaster Regiment. He stood for election in County Sligo as an independent in 1883. He was appointed an Officer of the Order of the British Empire in 1920.

O'Hara was a farmer, land owner and polo player for Sligo; he was president of the Co. Sligo Agricultural Show Society and an animal exhibitor. He died at the family property, Annaghmore, Collooney, Co. Sligo, on 7 August 1947.

Honorary titles
Preceded by Edward Henry Cooper	Lord Lieutenant of Sligo; 1902–1922	Succeeded by defunct
