= Lord Lieutenant of Sligo =

Ceremonial officer in Sligo, Ireland

This is a list of people who have served as Lord Lieutenant of Sligo.

There were lieutenants of counties in Ireland until the reign of James II, when they were renamed governors. The office of Lord Lieutenant was recreated on 23 August 1831.

== Governors ==
- William Blayney, 6th Baron Blayney c1690– (died 1705)
- Joshua Cooper: 1746–1755
- Joshua Cooper: 1758–1800
- Edward King, 1st Earl of Kingston: 1772–1797
- Charles O'Hara, 1789–1822
- Owen Wynne, 1789–1831
- Henry King, 1795–1821 (died 1821)
- Joshua Edward Cooper, 1802–1831
- John Irwin, –1831

== Lord Lieutenants ==
- Sir Francis Knox-Gore, 1st Baronet, 5 December 1831 – December 1868
- Sir Robert Gore-Booth, 4th Baronet, 18 December 1868 – 21 December 1876
- Edward Henry Cooper, 10 March 1877 – 26 February 1902
- Charles Kean O'Hara, 27 May 1902 – 1922
