= William Frederick Wakeman =

Irish archaeologist (1822–1900)

- Born: 1822
- Died: 15 October, 1900 (aged 77–78)

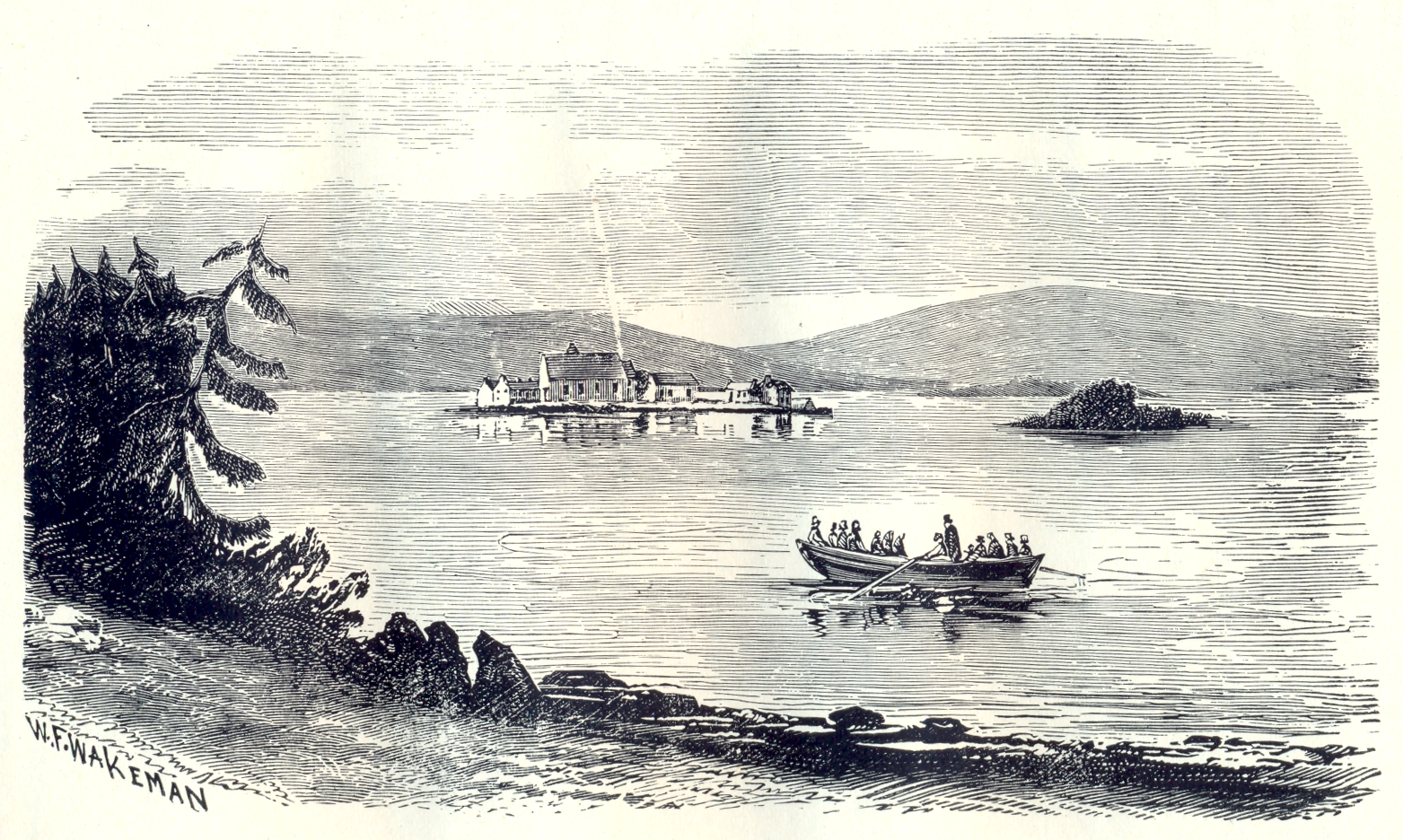
Wakeman's illustration of pilgrims rowing to Station Island on Lough Derg, County Donegal.

William Frederick Wakeman (1822 – 15 October 1900) was an Irish archaeologist, initially producing works as an artist and then as an author.

== Life ==
W. F. Wakeman was born in Dublin, 1822. His father was a publisher. A student of George Petrie, Wakeman produced pen and pencil sketches of land features and antiquities while employed as a draughtsman by the Ordnance Survey of Ireland. The works of this period are held by the Royal Irish Academy.

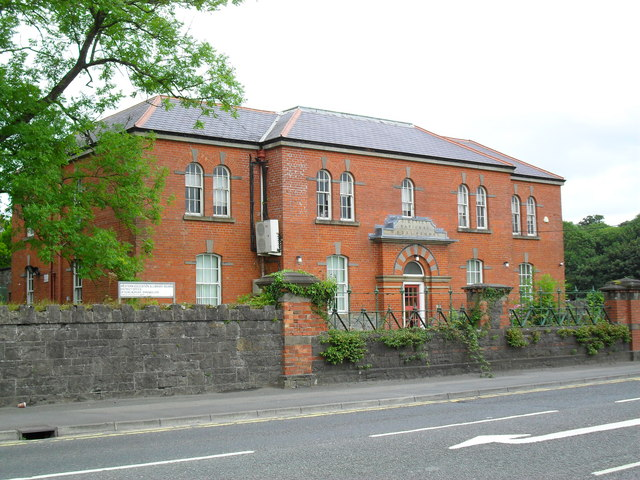
Former District National Model School in Enniskillen, where Wakeman taught in later life.

After the closing of the topographical department of the Survey, he took teaching roles at St. Columba's College in County Meath and the Portora Royal and District National Model schools in Enniskillen, County Fermanagh. He eventually abandoned art to pursue his interest in archaeology.

Wakeman died on 15 October 1900, in Coleraine, County Londonderry.

== Works ==
- Wakeman, W.F. (1848), Archaeologica Hibernica: A Hand-book of Irish Antiquities
  - Archaeologica Hibernica: A Hand-book of Irish Antiquities (2nd ed.), 1891
  - Cooke, John, ed. (1903), Wakeman's Handbook of Irish Antiquities (3rd ed.), Dublin: Hodges, Figgis & Co, pp. iii–viii
- Wakeman, W.F. (1852), Three Days On the Shannon: From Limerick to Lough Key
- Wakeman, W.F. (1853), Dublin: what's to be seen and how to see it, hdl:2027/uiug.30112037321723
- Wakeman, W.F. (1865), Tourists' guide through Dublin and its interesting suburbs : specially suited to the visitors of the international exhibition, 1865
- Wakeman, W.F. (1870), Lough Erne, Enniskillen, Belleek, Ballyshannon, and Bundoran : with routes from Dublin to Enniskillen and Bundoran.
- Wakeman, W.F. (1887), The tourist's guide to Ireland
- Wakeman, W.F. (1893), A survey of the antiquarian remains on the island of Inismurray
- Wakeman, W.F. (1886), Graves and monuments of illustrious Irishmen

As illustrator only

- O'Rorke, T. (1878), History Antiquities, and Present State of the Parishes of Ballysodare and Kilvarnet in the County of Sligo
- O'Connor, D. (1879), Lough Derg and its Pilgrimages
- Wood-Martin, W.G. (1886), The Lake Dwellings of Ireland : or Lacustrine Habitations of Erin, commonly called Crannogs, Hodges, Figgsis, & Co. : Dublin; Longmans, Green, & Co. : London
