= Charles William O'Hara =

Irish Conservative politician

Member of Parliament for County Sligo
- In office 13 May 1859 – 17 July 1865 Serving with Robert Gore-Booth
- Preceded by: Robert Gore-Booth; Edward Joshua Cooper
- Succeeded by: Robert Gore-Booth; Edward Henry Cooper

Personal details
- Born: Charles William Cooper; 1817
- Died: 20 May 1870 (aged 52–53)
- Party: Conservative

Charles William O'Hara (1817 – 20 May 1870), known as Charles William Cooper until 27 November 1860, was an Irish Conservative politician.

He was educated at Trinity College Dublin.

O'Hara was elected Conservative MP for County Sligo at the 1859 general election and held the seat until 1865 when he did not seek re-election.

== Arms ==
Coat of arms of Charles William O'Hara

Notes
Granted 19 December 1860 by Sir John Berard Burke, Ulster King of Arms.
Crest
1st a demi lion rampant Ermine holding between the paws a chaplet of oak leaves Proper (O'Hara) 2nd a man's bust in profile couped at the shoulders Proper on the head an Irish crown Or and charged on the neck with a crescent Sablr overhead an escroll inscribed "Vinciy Amor Patriae" (Cooper).
Escutcheon
Quarterly 1st & 4th Vert on a pale radiant Or a lion rampant Sable (O'Hara) 2nd & 3rd Gules on a bend between six lions rampant Or a crescent Sable (Cooper).
Motto
Virtute Et Claritate

Parliament of the United Kingdom
Preceded by Robert Gore-Booth; Edward Joshua Cooper	Member of Parliament for County Sligo; 1859–1865; With: Robert Gore-Booth	Succeeded by Robert Gore-Booth; Edward Henry Cooper
