= Lissadell House =

Country house in County Sligo, Ireland

Coordinates: 54°21′N 8°35′W

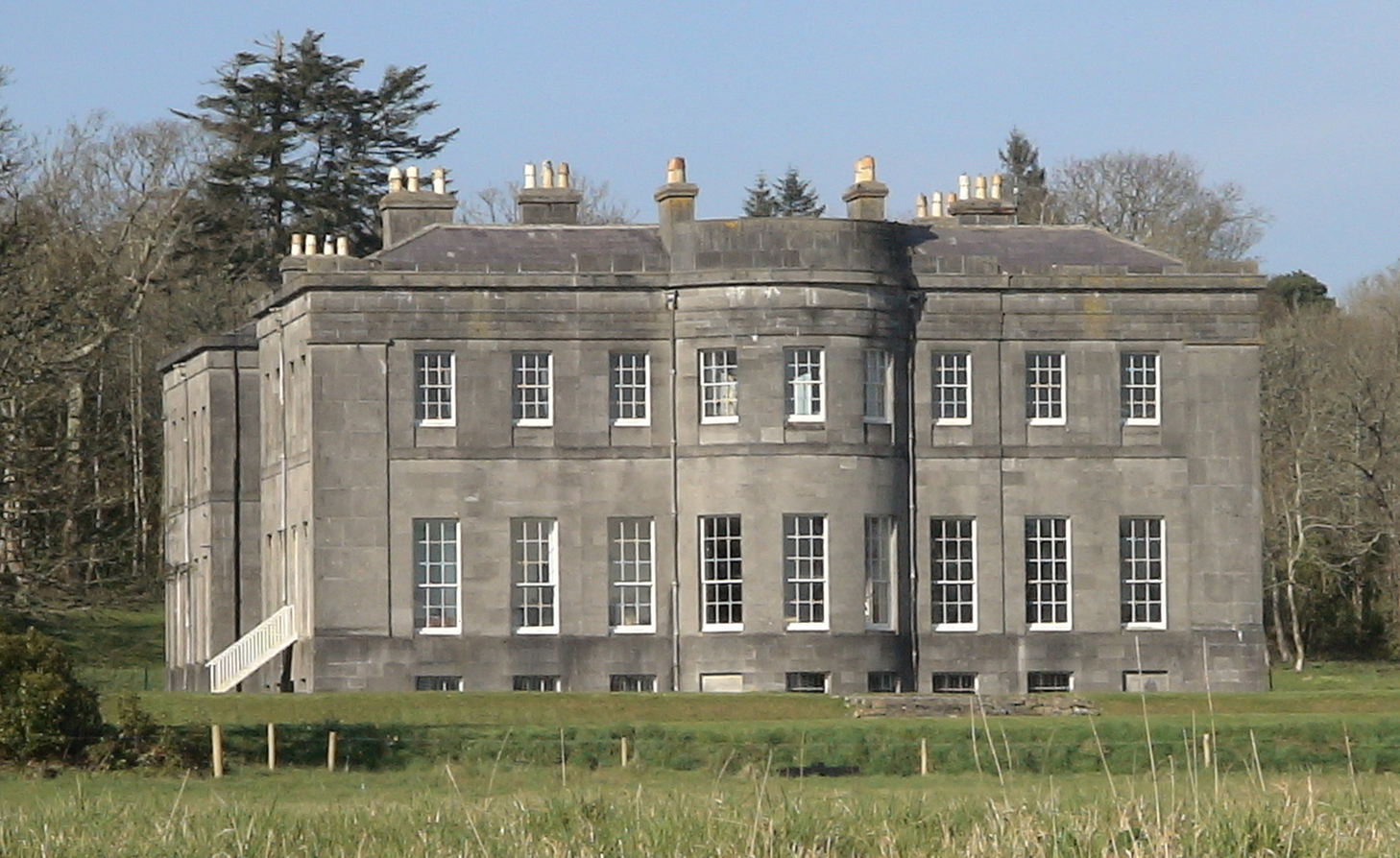
Lissadell House

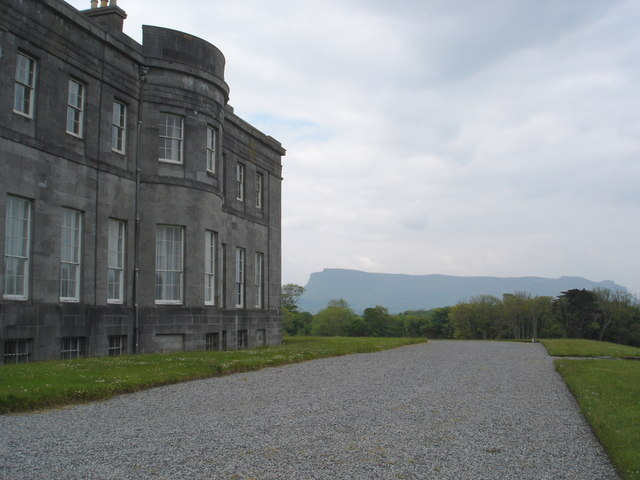
Benbulbin in the distance

Lissadell House is a neo-classical Greek revivalist style country house in County Sligo, Ireland.

The house was built between 1830 and 1835 for Sir Robert Gore-Booth, 4th Baronet (1784–1835) by London architect Francis Goodwin. Sir Robert left the house and surrounding estate to his son, Sir Henry Gore-Booth, 5th Baronet.

== Architecture ==
Described as "austere in the extreme", Lissadell house is a Greek Revival style detached nine-bay, two-storey over basement mansion, the last one in this style to be built in Ireland. It is constructed of Ballysadare limestone with finely jointed ashlar walling. An entrance front is on the north with a three-bay pedimented central projection, originally open to east and west to form porte-cochere.

Before its sale in 2003, Lissadell was the only house in Ireland to retain its original Williams & Gibton furniture, which was made especially for the house and designed to harmonise with Goodwin's architectural vision.

Lissadell's was the first country house in Ireland to have an independent gas supply piped into the property.

== Location ==
The house is on the south shore of Maugherow Peninsula in northern County Sligo overlooking Drumcliff Bay. It is in the townland of Lissadill, in the Barony of Carbury (formerly the túath of Cairbre Drom Cliabh). The house takes its name from the Irish placename, Lios an Doill Uí Dálaigh or O'Dalys Court of the Blind, possibly referring to the Ó Dálaigh school of poetry that existed here in the 13th century.

== History ==
The estate was formed from land granted in the early 17th century to the Elizabethan soldier Sir Paul Gore for his services to the English crown during the Nine Years' War. The land was confiscated from ecclesiastical lands belonging to the monastery of Drumcliff and the Lords of Ó Conchobhair Sligigh and the Ó hAirt (O'Hart) chiefs of the territory. The original seat of the estate was at Ardtarmon Castle, a 17th-century fortified house several kilometres to the west. The present house replaced an earlier 13th century house closer to the shore which was demolished.

The estate was once 32,000 acres (13,000 ha) but now consists of less than 500 acres (200 ha), the immediate demesne of the house. The house was the childhood home of Irish revolutionary, Constance Gore-Booth, her sister the poet and suffragist, Eva Gore-Booth, and their siblings, Mabel Gore-Booth, Mordaunt Gore-Booth and Josslyn Gore-Booth. It was also the sometime holiday retreat of the world-renowned poet, William Butler Yeats. He made the house famous with the opening lines of his poem:

"In Memory of Eva Gore-Booth and Con Markiewicz"
The light of evening, Lissadell,
Great windows open to the south,
Two girls in silk kimonos, both
Beautiful, one a gazelle.

The estate was bought from Josslyn Gore-Booth by the Cassidy-Walsh family in 2003 for €4 million. The Cassidy-Walsh family spent a further €9.5 million restoring the estate.

== Controversies ==
=== The clearance of Ballygilgan ===
This controversy occurred just prior to the famine and concerned the clearance of a settlement on the Lissadell estate as part of the "improvement" of the estate by consolidation of small holdings into larger more viable farms through "assisted emigration". The issue was whether these people were forced to go or left by choice.

=== The Lissadell affair ===
This controversy centred around the sacking of Gabrielle Gore-Booth by the then Solicitor General amid allegations of mismanagement of the estate, in the late 1950s and early 1960s, when the heir Michael was made a ward of court. It generated considerable public indignation when it was first told by English journalist Anne Robinson. Gabrielle's counter claim involved the illegal felling of estate timber. Calls for a public inquiry were followed by an investigation by RTÉ’s current affairs programme Seven Days, re-examining the claim in respect of the timber, which had been dismissed as ‘absurd’.

Judgment was delivered in April 1965 by Justice Davitt who summed up by saying "Neither Gabrielle or her mother or sister have any legal rights whatever to any say in the matter as to how Lissadell is to be managed. They have no legal right even to be at Lissadell. They have been allowed to remain there because of the belief that if Sir Michael Gore-Booth were under no disability it would be his wish permanently to extend the hospitality of his home to his mother and sisters. That belief may or may not be well founded. I do not consider it necessary to direct that felling of timber be discontinued".

=== Sale in 2004 ===
In 2003, the house was put up for sale by the then owner, Sir Josslyn Gore-Booth (a grand-nephew of the original Josslyn Gore-Booth), for €3 million. The sale was controversial because, as well as being one of Ireland's finest houses, there are many historical associations with the house. It was the home of Constance Markievicz, associated with the poet W. B. Yeats and, because of its links to Markievicz and the 1916 Rising, it can be argued that the house is inextricably linked to the foundation of the state. Many, including Sir Josslyn himself, hoped that it would be purchased by the state, saying, "Suffice it to say I would welcome an interest on the part of the state".

However, the then Fianna Fáil government under Bertie Ahern waived any interest in the estate, citing a cost report commissioned by Environment Minister Martin Cullen which suggested that the overall cost to the State of purchasing Lissadell and refurbishing it as a major visitor attraction would cost in the region of €28 million, a figure which has been claimed to be inaccurate by many, including Sir Josslyn himself. The state also waived any interest in the auction of the contents of the house.

A consortium was set up consisting of businessmen and politicians to buy the house in trust for the state; however, the house was eventually sold in 2003 to a private couple, Dublin barristers Edward Walsh and Constance Cassidy, who began to restrict access through the estate shortly after, citing privacy and safety concerns. In 2013 a Supreme Court ruling determined that no public right of way exist across the four routes traversing the historic estate.

=== Access dispute 2008 to 2013 ===
==== Background ====
Protests over access through the estate began shortly after the sale with the formation of a group called the 'Lissadell Action Group' who campaigned to have public rights of way through the estate confirmed. The protestors claimed that there had been free access through the estate for the previous hundred years and based their claim in part on a statement by Sir Josslyn. In a 1987 interview recorded in the Lissadell Estate papers he said: "This sea drive, or Avenue, then turns inland through the woods to the west of the house, eventually curving round to the north entrance of the house. Today the Avenue is a favourite haunt of picnic and bathing parties but this is not a recent idea; the people of Sligo have been able to use this area for recreation since the beginning of this century.". This assertion glossed over that this part of Lissadell had been sold under the Land Acts, and that Coillte (the Irish State Forestry Commission) owned the sea avenue and land on either side of it.

In 2007, during a visit to the house by Taoiseach Bertie Ahern to open an art exhibition, protestors claimed that "were Countess Markievicz here, she would be protesting with them" to which he replied that "the state can't take over every great house in the country. Lissadell is clearly in very loving hands. The owners have done a wonderful job."

Sligo County Council had by 2008 received 40 submissions from citizens and sought legal advice on access to the land. On a motion put by Councillor Joe Leonard in December 2008, the council voted unanimously to preserve public rights of way that the council contended existed on the estate. This motion began the procedure to vary the County Development Plan to include the four roads through the estate.

In response, the Walshes announced the house's closure on 8 January 2009 due to the dispute with Sligo County Council.

==== First judgement ====
The owners instituted legal proceedings against the council claiming that there are no dedicated public rights of way over the estate and the council counterclaimed, asserting public rights of way over the four main avenues. The owners indicated that they would not be reopening Lissadell if the council won the court action.

In Ireland a right of way can be established if there has been a dedication by its owner to the public and secondly, if the public has accepted this dedication. In the absence of an express dedication, one must be inferred from the behaviour of the owner. General rights of way can also be asserted by use "since time immemorial".

In order to infer whether a dedication existed, the case focussed on the erection and subsequent removal of a barrier in 1993 by Sir Josslyn, apparently to keep out New Age Travellers.

The High Court judge (McMahon J) decided on the fact that no objection was made by Sir Josslyn to its subsequent removal by locals, that this showed that he regarded the rights of way as belonging to the public. The 58-day-long hearings ended in June 2010, with judgement upholding the council's claims over the avenues.

Legal costs for both sides at this stage were estimated at €6 million. The grounds remained closed.

==== Appeal ====
The Walsh-Cassidys then appealed to the Supreme Court of Ireland. They claimed that Justice McMahon had "made a fundamental error" in his ruling arguing that he "had erred in converting evidence about use since the 1950s of four routes in the 410-acre estate into an effective presumption about, and significant extension of, the law governing rights of way". The case hinged again on whether a dedication of right of way had been intended by the previous owners of Lissadell. This time the 1993 incident was interpreted to imply that Sir Josslyn saw the avenue as his to block and only relented in the interest of public relations.

The Supreme Court issued a 117-page judgement on 11 November 2013 that ruled in favour of the owners, excepting a public right of access along the beach.

On 3 April 2014 the Supreme Court found that Sligo County Council must pay 75% of the costs of the appellants, estimated at 5.25 million, and all of its own costs for the 58 day legal battle. In 2018, the parties reached a settlement on some of the owners' costs, which by then were estimated at about €7 million.

==== Issues ====
The case brought up the difficulty of determining whether public rights of way exist, and the bitterness, cost, and duration of the resulting legal actions, against the background of sharply differing notions of sound public policy and history.

Recognition of the implications of a precedent being set by the Lissadell case regarding these underlying issues was expressed by several of Sligo Council representatives while discussing the case, who stated "We are opening a can of worms here. 100 years ago there was a mass path across my land." and "while it was Lissadell House today", "what about [the implications for] ordinary farmers in other places".

The Supreme court ruling has been criticised by advocates of open access to the countryside, including Mountaineering Ireland for "setting the bar too high", effectively making it impossible to assert right of way through long use, instead requiring dedication by the landowner, a position abandoned in most European jurisdictions, including England, as too onerous a proof.

On the other hand, the Supreme court decision has been welcomed by the Irish farmers organisation the Irish Creamery Milk Suppliers Association (ICMSA). The President of the ICMSA, John Comer, said that it was "a victory for common sense" and will help set landowners' minds at ease.

It has been noted that the reliance in the Lissadell case on old English common law precedents inherited by the state and the lack of reference to the Constitution of Ireland in both judgements, highlights the continued reliance of the courts of the Republic of Ireland on English law and precedent, and concomitant upholding of English style property rights, which may or may not be suited to the present situation in Ireland.

Rights of way clashes have also occurred at Ashford Castle in County Mayo in 2011.

== Concerts ==
- Westlife - Where We Are Tour: 30 July 2010
- Leonard Cohen - Leonard Cohen Tour 2008–2010: 31 July; 1 August 2010

== See also ==
- List of works by Francis Goodwin
