= List of Old Oratorians =

The following is a list of some notable Old Oratorians, being former pupils of The Oratory School in the United Kingdom.

== Literature ==
- Hilaire Belloc, writer and historian.
- Christopher Tolkien, J. R. R. Tolkien's son.
- Michael Tolkien, J. R. R. Tolkien's son.
- Gregory Woods, poet.

== Politics ==
- Francis Nicholas Blundell, conservative politician.
- Edmund FitzAlan-Howard, conservative politician.
- Peter Hope, diplomat.
- James Fitzalan Hope, 1st Baron Rankeillour, conservative politician.
- Arthur Oswald James Hope, 2nd Baron Rankeillour, Soldier and Conservative politician.
- Igor Judge, Lord Chief Justice of England and Wales.
- Edward Leigh, conservative politician.
- Pierse Loftus, conservative politician.
- Charles James Mathew, labour politician.
- Jack Miller, United States Senator.
- Martin Archer-Shee, Conservative Party politician and British army officer.
- Edward Sheil, nationalist politician.

== Military ==
- Sir Adrian Carton de Wiart, Lieutenant General and Victoria Cross holder.
- Rudolph Feilding, Viscount Feilding, Lieutenant-Colonel.
- Walter Lentaigne, Lieutenant General
- George Henry Morris, Lieutenant-Colonel.
- Edward Noel, Lieutenant-Colonel.
- Sir Edmund Paston Bedingfeld, 9th Baronet.
- George Pereira, Brigadier General.
- Cecil Pereira, Major-General Sir.
- John Pell Archer-Shee, Brigadier
- Edmund Tempest, pilot.
- Roger Tempest, Brigadier General.

== Royalty and nobility ==
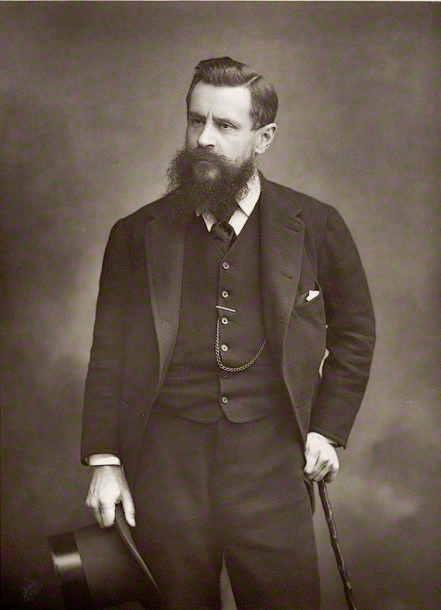
The 15th duke of Norfolk

- Afonso de Santa Maria, Prince of Beira.
- Sir Richard Crichton Mitchell Cotts, 4th Baronet.
- William Feilding, 10th Earl of Denbigh.
- Bernard Fitzalan-Howard, 3rd Baron Howard of Glossop.
- Bernard Fitzalan-Howard, 16th Duke of Norfolk.
- Henry Fitzalan-Howard, 15th Duke of Norfolk.
- Arthur French, 5th Baron de Freyne
- Francis French, 6th Baron de Freyne
- Sir Cyril Aubrey Charles Hampson, 12th Baronet.
- Henry Hope, 3rd Baron Rankeillour, Soldier, barrister, landowner
- Philip Kerr, 11th Marquess of Lothian.
- Sir Maurice Lacy, 2nd Baronet.
- Sir Humphrey de Trafford, 4th Baronet.
- Lionel Petre, 16th Baron Petre
- James Sempill, 21st Lord Sempill

== Business ==
- Ed Conway, first economics editor of Sky News.
- George M. von Furstenberg, economist.

== Sport ==
- Robert Berkeley, cricket player.
- John Pius Boland, tennis player and Olympic gold medal winner.
- Danny Cipriani, rugby union player.
- Stewart Davison, cricket player.
- Hubert Eaton, cricket player.
- Ayoola Erinle, rugby union player.
- Benny Howell, cricket player.
- George Macnamara, Irish cricket player.
- Tim Male, Olympic rower.
- Alex Pearce, football player.
- Michael Roberts, cricket player.
- Steve Tomlinson, rugby union player.
- Andy Vilk rugby union player.
- Tim Atkins, hockey player.

== Arts and entertainment ==
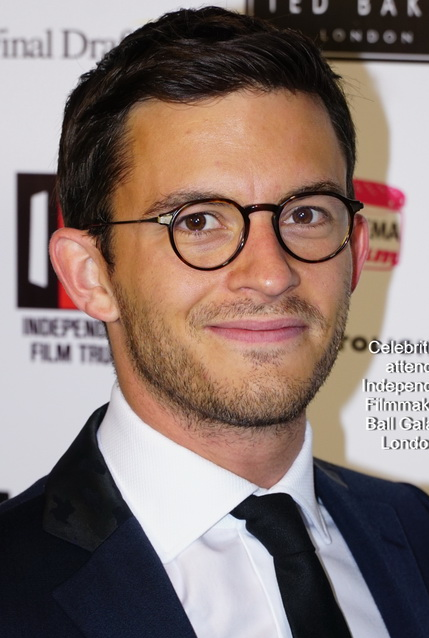
Jonathan Bailey

- Jonathan Bailey, actor.
- Michael Berkeley, composer.
- Niccolo d'Ardia Caracciolo, painter.
- Gervase Elwes, tenor.
- Simon Elwes, painter.
- Arthur Hervey, composer.
- Steven Sykes, artist

== Other ==
- Charles John Philip Cave, meteorologist.
- Michael Levey, historian.
- Theobald Mathew, lawyer.
- George Ogilvie-Forbes, diplomat
- George Pereira, explorer.
- Edward Pereira, priest.
- Tom Sandars, television and radio presenter.
- John Hungerford Pollen, English Jesuit, known as a historian of the Protestant Reformation.
- Arthur Joseph Hungerford Pollen, English journalist, businessman.

== In fiction ==
- George Balfour, one of the main characters in the play Posh and later film adaptation The Riot Club.
