= General Periera =

General Periera may refer to:

- Cecil Pereira (1869–1942), British Army major general
- George Pereira (1865–1923), British Army brigadier general
- Nuno Álvares Pereira (1360–1431), Portuguese general

== See also ==
- General Perera (disambiguation)
