= Freyne =

Freyne may refer to:

- Peter Freyne (1949–2009), American political journalist
- Baron de Freyne, a title in the Peerage of the United Kingdom.
