= Francis French =

Francis French may refer to:

- Francis French (author) (born 1970), book and magazine author specialising in space flight history
- Francis French, 6th Baron de Freyne (1884–1935), Anglo-Irish peer
- Francis French, 7th Baron de Freyne (1927–2009), Anglo-Irish peer
- Francis Henry French (1857–1921), United States Army general
- Francis John French (born 1941), English civil servant
