= Ronald True =

English murderer

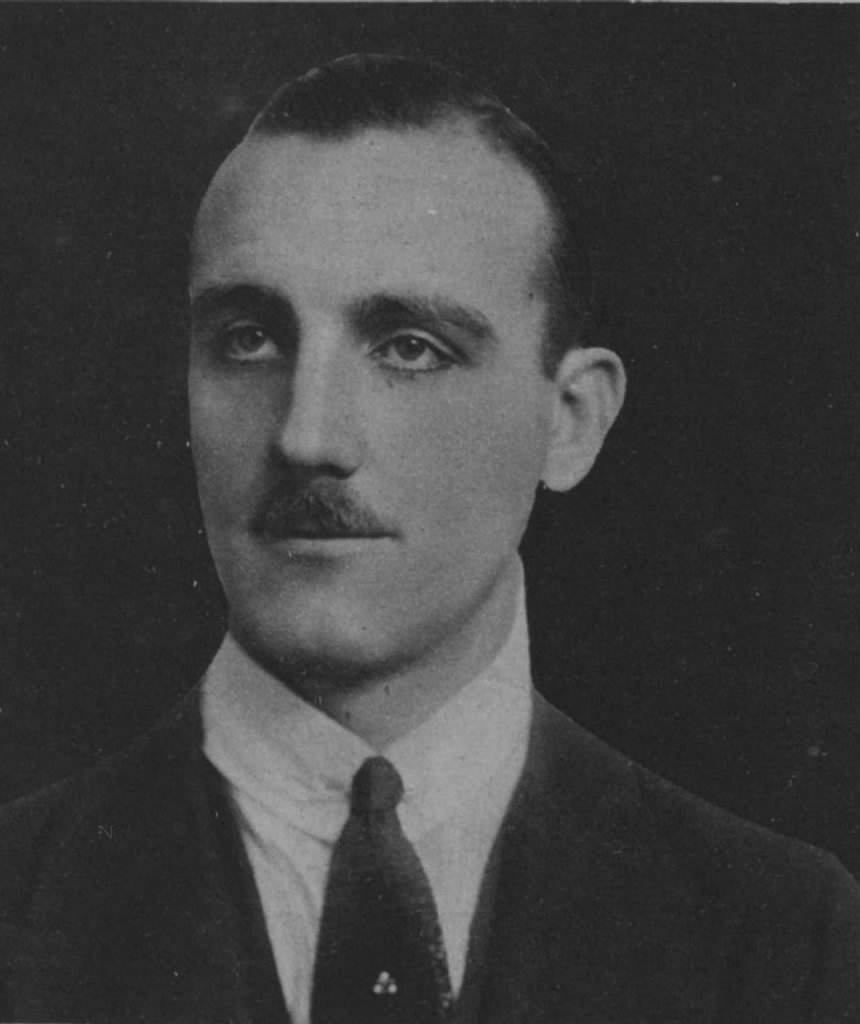
- Ronald True, c. 1921
- Born: Angus Ronald True; 17 June 1891; Chorlton-on-Medlock, Manchester, England
- Died: 8 January 1951 (aged 59); Broadmoor Hospital, Crowthorne, Berkshire, England
- Occupation: Former military pilot
- Years active: 1915–1916
- Status: Conviction reprieved on grounds of insanity (8 June 1922)
- Conviction: Murder (5 May 1922)
- Criminal charges: Murder
- Penalty: Death by hanging

Details
- Victims: Gertrude Yates (aka Olive Young)
- Imprisoned at: HM Prison Pentonville (later transferred to Broadmoor Hospital upon reprieve)

Ronald True (17 June 1891 – 8 January 1951) was an English murderer who was convicted of the 1922 bludgeoning and murder by asphyxiation of a 25-year-old prostitute and call girl named Gertrude Yates. He was sentenced to death for Yates's murder, and an appeal was dismissed by the Lord Chief Justice.

True was later reprieved following a psychiatric examination ordered by the Home Secretary which determined that True was legally insane. True was then confined for life in Broadmoor Hospital in lieu of his death sentence. He died of a heart attack while still confined at Broadmoor in January 1951, aged 59.

== Early life ==
True was born in Chorlton-on-Medlock, Manchester, England on 17 June 1891, the son of an unmarried 16-year-old girl named Annabelle Angus, who doted on her son. (Note: The identity of True's biological father is not known.)

As a child, True was markedly disobedient and selfish to his family and peers, and his public school attendance record poor. He was regularly disciplined for acts of truancy and disobedience, and is known to have regularly committed acts of petty theft. He is also known to have frequently exhibited cruelty to animals.

In 1902, True's mother married a wealthy man named Arthur Reginald French, who would later inherit the title Baron de Freyne, enabling both mother and son access to many provisions money could not previously afford. True was subsequently educated at the prestigious Bedford Grammar School, although he also habitually truanted from this school. Three years later, his mother developed a serious illness. When True's aunt informed him of this fact, he simply replied: "Oh well, if she dies all her property will be mine. I'll give you her two best rings straight away."

=== Employment ===
In 1909, at age 17, True left Bedford Grammar School. He had grown into a well-built man, well above the average height of his peers, although he displayed little interest in finding employment or learning a trade. In response, his stepfather sent him to various colonial countries such as New Zealand and Argentina to learn various trades such as farming and management, although True was invariably dismissed from each of these employment roles after short periods of time, returning to England. By approximately 1912, he had become a frequent user of morphine.

By the summer of 1914, True lived in Shanghai, although following the outbreak of World War I, he returned to England.

== Royal Flying Corps ==
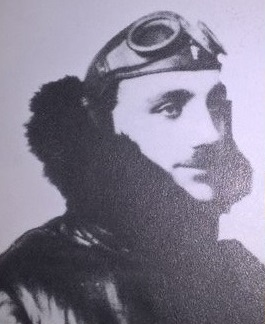
True, pictured while enlisted in the Royal Flying Corps, c. 1916

True was commissioned into the Royal Flying Corps as a student pilot in 1915, training at a flying school in Gosport, Hampshire. Contemporary records indicate his performance was substandard. He is known to have crashed his plane on his first solo cross-country trial flight in Farnborough in February 1916, suffering severe concussion and remaining unconscious for two days. The following month, he again crashed his plane—this time in Gosport—suffering only minor cuts and bruises. Shortly after this second accident, he suffered a nervous breakdown. Seven months later, in October 1916, True was discharged from the Royal Flying Corps. Just weeks later, he would be briefly hospitalised following his collapse inside a Southsea theatre. True himself would later ascribe this period of hospitalisation to his having contracted syphilis. (Note: The results of a Wassermann test within this hospital concluded True was free from this disease.)

Early the following year, True obtained a job as a test pilot at the Government Control Works in Yeovil, although he soon lost this job due to his erratic behaviour, short temper, and poor performance.

== Relocation to New York ==
In June 1917, True travelled to New York. Falsely claiming to be an English pilot with combat experience, he briefly obtained a job as a flying instructor with the United States War Department. He was soon deployed to Houston, although his poor performance soon saw his dismissal. True then briefly travelled to Mexico before returning to New York in June 1918.

=== Marriage ===
At a party in New York, True became acquainted with a young actress named Frances Roberts; introducing himself as a Royal Air Force pilot. The two married prior to his deployment to Houston, and following his return to New York in June 1918, they travelled extensively across America before relocating to England in February 1919. (Note: Shortly after their marriage, True was arrested for writing invalid cheques in his stepfather's name, spending several months incarcerated in a San Francisco prison. His wife remained loyal to him as he served this sentence.)

Shortly after relocating to England, True's family secured a job for him as an assistant manager at the Taquah Mining Company, located within the Gold Coast (now Ghana). He and his pregnant wife set sail for the region in late February. His habitual lying and general poor conduct saw him dismissed from the position within six months, and he and his wife again returned to England. This dismissal infuriated his stepfather, who severed all contact with True upon his return to England, but did continue to grant him a financial allowance to support himself and his family.

== Dissociative identity disorder ==
By 1920, True's daily morphine intake had increased to up to thirty grains. His behaviour was also markedly more erratic. At the insistence of his wife and mother, he spent approximately six months in a Southsea nursing home for treatment of his morphia addiction and the resulting mental ailments, which included an incipient split personality. While incarcerated at this facility, True was observed to be prone to sudden mood swings, and to frequently simply sit in silence for long periods of time while staring at either the sea or the sky. He was also convinced he was shadowed by a doppelgänger who shared his name (but spelled Ronald Trew) and who was his mortal enemy. (Note: True would blame this doppelgänger for his September 1921 conviction and fine for obtaining morphine from a Portsmouth chemist using forged prescriptions.)

On several occasions, True would absent himself from his nursing home and travel to London, where he would survive via acts of theft and passing forged cheques, although whenever confronted with bills or proof of his fraudulent activities, he would insist the matter he was confronted with did not belong to him, but "the other Ronald True."

Upon discharging himself from this nursing home, True relocated with his wife to Portsmouth. He and his wife lived together in this city for approximately twelve months. At the insistence of his family, True again became an in-patient at a nursing home in an effort to cure him of his morphine addiction. Upon his discharge, he briefly lived with his aunt in Folkestone, to whom he claimed three palmists across the world had informed him he was to be murdered at "the hands of a woman" and that, as he was only destined to live a short life, he intended to maximise his pleasures.

In late 1921, True abandoned his wife and child—removing both as beneficiaries from his will—after learning she had resumed her acting career. Shortly thereafter, he relocated alone to London, falsely informing his family a Mr. Harris had offered him a lucrative job. From thereon, he supported himself via his weekly allowance and by committing various acts of petty theft and fraud.

=== Relocation to London ===
On or about 7 January 1922, True severed all physical contact with his family and relocated to London, where he frequented various West End bars and clubs, living affluently but surviving upon his allowance, via acts of theft, and by paying various hotel and restaurant bills with forged cheques. Whenever confronted with suspicion of acts of theft or caught red-handed in the act, he would insist the perpetrator was one Ronald Trew, whom he described as an "armed and dangerous criminal" and who was continually shadowing him, passing about dud cheques which his own "poor mother" was having to honour. To protect himself against this individual, in early February, True purchased a pistol from an acquaintance named James Armstrong for £2, explaining he was determined to find and kill this individual. Later the same month, True informed a female acquaintance—whom he had threatened to continually keep his company or be shot—that he intended to commit the perfect murder, for which he would not be punished. (Note: By the third week of February, True had ceased harassing this woman after passing a dud cheque at the club where she worked.)

In the months prior to True's separation from his wife, she had become increasingly concerned about his general state of mind. On two occasions in early 1922, she travelled to London to successfully trace his whereabouts. On the second occasion, True's wife located him at a Soho restaurant and was sufficiently alarmed by his demeanour to report her concerns to Scotland Yard, who in turn referred her to a private detective. However, by the time she had relayed her concerns to Scotland Yard on 3 March, True had again vanished.

== Acquaintance with Gertrude Yates ==
True had first encountered 25-year-old Gertrude Yates on 18 February. Yates was a prostitute and call girl whose regular clients were frequently—if not exclusively—affluent individuals who could afford to entertain her at venues such as cinemas, restaurants, and dance-halls before spending the evening with her. She had first become acquainted with True in a West End lounge, being informed by True that he was a Major within the British Army. (Note: Yates was a former shop worker who, in the years prior to her death, had begun working as a prostitute and call girl using the alias Olive Young. She frequently entertained her clients in her basement flat at 13 Finborough Road, Fulham.)

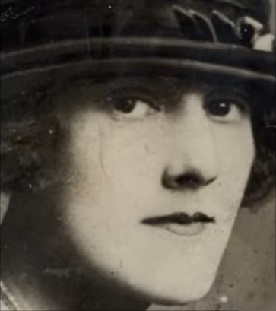
Gertrude Yates

On the first occasion the two spent the night together, True stole approximately £5 from her handbag before leaving her flat the morning after their acquaintance, resulting in Yates initially resolving never to see him again. However, over the following fortnight, True regularly pestered her with both haranguing and pleading telephone calls and by calling at her flat unannounced, although Yates would invariably refuse to speak with him.

By 2 March, True resided at the Grand Hotel on Northumberland Avenue. The same day, he acquired the chauffeuring services of a Knightsbridge-based vehicle hiring firm. His appointed chauffeur was a man named Luigi Mazzola, who frequently drove True to destinations across London as far afield as Richmond to locations such as dance-halls and hotels. Typically, True would spend all his money at these venues and, in the short duration of time Mazzola was employed as his chauffeur, True never paid the chauffeuring firm for his services.

On three consecutive evenings between 2 and 4 March, True instructed Mazzola to drive to Finborough Road, where Yates lived, although on each occasion, Yates was either not present in her home or refused to permit him entrance into her flat. On the third occasion, he returned alone to his chauffeur from the direction of Yates's flat and instructed Mazzola to drive him to the Castle Hotel, where he dined with a Mr. and Mrs. Sachs. In the course of their meal, he informed the couple of his knowledge of a woman who lived in a basement flat in Fulham who had money, and that he intended to obtain this money even if via the act of murder.

=== Murder ===
In the late evening of 5 March, True—by this time virtually penniless—again instructed Mazzola to drive him to Yates's flat. For unknown reasons, on this occasion, she allowed him to spend the evening in her company. (Note: Yates was last seen alive by her friend, Mrs. Doris Dent, at Piccadilly Circus tube station at approximately 10:30 p.m., purchasing a ticket to Earl's Court tube station, from where she invariably walked the short distance to her Finborough Road flat. Given the late hour, it is likely she allowed True into her flat to avoid a commotion.) Before True entered the flat, he instructed Mazzola his chauffeuring services were no longer required.

Some time after 7:30 the following morning, True prepared a cup of tea for himself and Yates. As Yates raised her head from her pillow to accept her cup, True bludgeoned her about the head five times with a rolling pin before thrusting a towel into her mouth—pushing her tongue backwards to obstruct her trachea—and tightening a dressing-gown cord around her neck, causing her to die of asphyxiation. He then drank his own cup of tea and ate some biscuits before dragging her naked body to the bathroom. True then stole approximately £8 from her purse and several items of jewellery from a dressing-table estimated to value approximately £200 (the equivalent of approximately £9,900 as of 2026). At approximately 9:35 a.m., he prepared to leave her flat.

As True prepared to leave the premises, he encountered the cleaning lady, a Miss Emily Steel, beginning to clean Yates's sitting room. In response, he exclaimed: "Don't wake Miss Young, we were late last night. She's in a deep sleep. I'll send the car round for her at twelve o' clock." Steel then handed True his coat before True left the premises to hail a taxi. Approximately 15 minutes later, Steel entered Yates's bedroom, discovering her heavily bloodstained bed with pillows stuffed beneath the quilts in an apparent effort to give the impression of a human form. A rolling pin was visible beneath the eiderdown. Steel then entered the bathroom, where she observed Yates's body.

Steel immediately contacted police, informing officers she knew the individual whom she had observed leaving her employer's flat as one "Major True". Inside the sitting room, investigators discovered a visiting card bearing the name Ronald True.

== Arrest ==
After leaving Yates's flat, True took a taxi to a nearby post office, where he phoned Mazzola, whom he instructed to drive to the address of his friend James Armstrong, then pick True himself up at the Strand Corner House later that morning. He was then driven to a menswear shop in Coventry Street where he purchased a new suit and bowler hat with money stolen from his victim, remarking to the salesman he had arrived from France via air that very morning and that he had acquired the blood on his clothes in an "aeroplane accident" shortly after crossing the English Channel. He then pawned two stolen rings at a Wardour Street pawnbrokers for £25 before, via prearrangement, meeting Armstrong at the Strand Corner House at 11 a.m. Mazzola drove the two men to various locations across London before driving the pair to the Hammersmith Palace of Varieties at about 8:40 p.m. His services were then dismissed.

Mazzola then returned to his garage, to find two Scotland Yard investigators—who had learned of True's habitual usage of his chauffeuring services—waiting. Having informed the investigators of True's whereabouts, Mazzola was then ordered by the investigators to drive them to the Hammersmith Palace of Varieties. True was arrested by four senior police officers inside the theatre at 9:45 p.m. that evening. He made no efforts to resist arrest.

True admitted to the arresting officers that he had been in Yates's flat the previous evening, but claimed to have left the premises when a "tall man, aged thirty-one" had begun arguing with Yates. Two days later, he was formally charged with Yates's murder. He was held on remand at a Brixton prison, to await trial. While incarcerated at this facility, he was placed under the observation of two medical officers, who, noting his excitable personality and insomnia, prescribed him sedatives in an effort to placate his temperament. (Note: These medical officers also noted True seemed elated as opposed to despondent over his predicament.)

== Trial ==
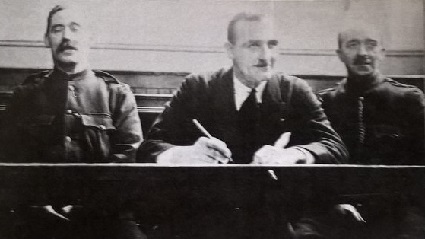
True (centre), pictured at his trial for the murder of Gertrude Yates. 1 May 1922.

The trial of Ronald True for the murder of Gertrude Yates began at the Old Bailey on 1 May 1922. He was tried before Mr Justice McCardie. Sir Richard Muir was the chief prosecutor. True was defended by Henry Curtis-Bennett.

Curtis-Bennett argued that his client was insane; he introduced two eminent psychiatrists who had separately examined True while on remand to testify that he suffered from a congenital mental disorder, which had been aggravated by his morphine addiction. Another witnesses to testify on behalf of the defence was a man to whom True had claimed an individual was visiting West End pubs and restaurants, impersonating him and "passing out dud cheques" in his name, which his mother was having to honour.

Richard Muir argued the motive behind Yates's murder was quite simple and driven by a sane motive: robbery. Muir contended that True needed money; that he had known Gertrude Yates had ample cash and valuables; and he had thus murdered her for her possessions. Having stolen everything of portable value he could carry, True had lost no time in turning the jewellery into cash. Muir contended these facts negated the defence's contention that Yates's murder was the act of a madman.

Muir did not call any prosecution witnesses; instead extensively cross-examining several defence witnesses in efforts to prove that, as True had made numerous efforts to avoid detection such as attempting to deter Yates's cleaning lady from entering her bedroom and claiming to a salesman the bloodstains on his clothes had been caused in an aeroplane accident, that he thus appreciated the criminality of his actions and was therefore criminally responsible. Muir also extensively discussed the M'Naghten Rules; emphasising that True knew the nature of his act, and since he had used every means that suggested itself to his mind to escape detection, he knew that what he had done was wrong. This made him legally culpable even if he was deranged.

"Ask yourselves, when you consider the evidence of those medical gentlemen, what were the facts before the murder? Had this man shown any inability to control his actions? He had ... been mixing with people day by day, and if you were to look at the matter during the periods (of time) spoken of by Armstrong, for example, the whole period of Armstrong's acquaintance with him, and of Mazzola's acquaintance, it is a period in which the prisoner had been controlling his actions as a fact, and if you judge this statement by these learned medical men by what happened after the murder, it is odd, because [they claim] he could not control his conduct."

— Section of Mr Justice McCardie's summation to the jury regarding the standards by which they would need to find True not guilty by reason of insanity. 5 May 1922.

=== Closing arguments ===
Following the closing arguments of both prosecution and defence, Judge McCardie instructed the jury that to find True insane, they would have to agree that he had no knowledge of what he was doing when he struck his victim not just once, but five times with the rolling pin before strangling her with her own dressing-gown cord, then attempting to dissuade the cleaning lady from discovering Yates's body before fleeing the premises.

Following a brief period of deliberation, the jury found True guilty of the wilful murder of Gertrude Yates on 5 May. Justice McCardie accordingly sentenced him to death. True did appeal his conviction, contending that, in reference to the M'Naghten Rules, Judge McCardie had misdirected the jury as to the criminal responsibility of the insane within his final address prior to their deliberations. This appeal was summarily dismissed by the Lord Chief Justice on 25 May.

== Reprieve ==
On 8 June 1922, True was reprieved by Home Secretary Edward Shortt, who had appointed three medical experts to assess True's sanity—all of whom concluded he was legally insane. On the basis of these experts' reports, Shortt recommended True's sentence be commuted to life imprisonment, to be served in a high-security psychiatric hospital.

The Home Secretary's decision to reprieve True caused considerable political and public controversy. Many believed, incorrectly, that True was being leniently treated for the crime of murder solely on account of his hailing from an influential family. This controversy was further heightened due to the concurrent case of an eighteen-year-old working-class pantry boy named Henry Julius Jacoby, who had murdered 65-year-old Lady Alice White in March 1922, and whom Justice McCardie had sentenced to death just days before True's trial. Although the jury that convicted Jacoby had strongly recommended mercy, he had been executed at Pentonville Prison on 7 June. (Note: Referencing the respective fates of True and Jacoby for the crime of murder, one newspaper remarked the men's respective social positions had "damned one and saved the other".)

Shortt was obliged to explain to the House of Commons that True's reprieve was not left to his personal discretion; the law gave him no option. At trial, True was found guilty by the stringent standards of the M'Naghten Rules, but the Home Secretary was legally held to different standards. Having information from the trial, which could not be ignored, that True's sanity was seriously in doubt, the Criminal Lunatics Act 1884 compelled him to order an enquiry. As True had been declared certifiably insane, the Common Law of England did not permit an insane person to be executed, mandating a reprieve.

=== Confinement and death ===
True was confined to Broadmoor Hospital. During his incarceration, he overcame his morphine addiction, and actively participated in the hospital's drama activities. He died of a heart attack while still incarcerated inside this facility on 8 January 1951 at the age of 59. Contemporary reports indicate the only person to attend his funeral was his 76-year-old mother.

== See also ==
- Capital punishment in the United Kingdom
- Insanity defence

== Cited works and further reading ==
- Carswell, Donald (1995) [1925]. Trial of Ronald True. Notable British Trials. William Hodge and Co. ISBN 0-85279-016-3.
- Fido, Martin (1995). Twentieth-century Murder: A Year by Year Account of the World's Most Pitiless Crimes. Bracken. ISBN 978-1-858-91390-2.
- Gaute, J.H.H.; Odell, Robin (1996). The New Murderer's Who's Who. Harrap Books. ISBN 978-0-245-54639-6.
- Hall, Angus (1976). Crimes of Horror. London: Hamlyn Publishing. ISBN 1-85051-170-5.
- Hodge, Harry (1994) [1954]. Famous Trials 2: Herbert Rowse Armstrong, Field and Gray, George Joseph Smith, Ronald True. Penguin Books. ISBN 978-0-140-00634-6.
- Honeycombe, Gordon (1982). The Murders of the Black Museum: 1870-1970. Hutchinson Publishing. pp. 234–241. ISBN 978-0-863-79040-9.
- Lane, Brian (1995). Chronicle of 20th Century Murder. Wiltshire: Select Editions. ISBN 978-0-425-14649-1.
- Lane, Brian (1991). The Murder Guide to Great Britain. London: Robinson Publishing Ltd. ISBN 1-854-87083-1.
- Morris, Jim (2015). The Who's Who of British Crime: In the Twentieth Century. Stroud: Amberley Publishing. ISBN 978-1-445-63924-6.
