= General Perera =

General Perera may refer to:

- Denis Perera (1930–2013), Sri Lanka Army general
- Janaka Perera (1946–2008), Sri Lanka Army major general
- Sumedha Perera (fl. 1970s–2010s), Sri Lanka Army major general

== See also ==
- General Periera (disambiguation)
