= George M. von Furstenberg =

English economist

George M. von Furstenberg (died 13 December 2022) was a noted economist, who served as the James H. Rudy Professor of Economics at Indiana University from 1983 to 2006. He was best known for his work in the areas of monetary policy, free trade policy and international finance.

== Early life and education ==
Von Furstenberg was born during Second World War. From 1955 to 1958, Von Furstenberg was educated at The Oratory School, a Roman Catholic boarding independent school for boys in the village of Woodcote in Oxfordshire in Southern England. He emigrated to America in his late teens, doing his undergraduate work at Columbia University, and graduating in magna cum laude in 1963. From there, he went on to a doctorate in International Finance at Princeton University, with an internship at the Brookings Institution as a pre-doctoral fellow.

== Life and career ==
Von Furstenberg served for a year as an assistant professor of economics at Cornell, followed by another stint at Brookings, this time as an Economic Policy Fellow assigned to the Program Evaluation Section of the Department of Housing and Urban Development (HUD). He returned to Cornell for two years as an assistant professor, then spent a summer as a consultant to HUD, before moving to Indiana as an associate professor. Following a stint as a visiting professor at the University of Augsburg, he became a full professor at Indiana, in 1973.

From 1973 to 1976 von Furstenberg served as Senior Staff Economist for the U.S. President's Council of Economic Advisors. He spent half a year as a resident economist at the American Enterprise Institute, then resumed his teaching duties in Bloomington. In 1978, he began a five-year stint as Chief of the Financial Studies Division of the International Monetary Fund. In 1983, he was named Rudy Professor of Economics.

While continuing to lecture at Indiana University, von Furstenberg made time for brief visiting professorships Justus-Liebig University and the University of Toronto and summer lectures at University of Szczecin, the Warsaw University School of Management International Business Program, and Catholic University of Lublin Business School. He was the recipient of numerous Fulbright and other grants, and consulted for several US government agencies as well as the Deutsche Bundesbank.

From 2000 to 2002, von Furstenberg was the inaugural Robert Bendheim Professor of Economic and Fiscal Policy at the Fordham Graduate School of Business.

The professor was married to Gabrielle, who predeceased him in 2019, and had one son. He spoke German and English fluently, and some knowledge of French, Latin and Spanish.

== Works ==
=== Articles and papers ===
==== Working papers ====
1. George M. von Furstenberg & B. Hofer, 1997. "Financial Integration in North America and in Europe Among Neighboring Countries at Different Stages of Development," Papers 25, American Institute for Contemporary German Studies.
2. Burton G. Malkiel & George M. von Furstenberg & Harry S. Watson, 1980. "Expectations, Tobins q, and Industry Investment," NBER Reprints 0054, National Bureau of Economic Research, Inc.

==== Articles ====
1. George M. von Furstenberg & Carlos B. Tabora, 2004. "Bolsa or NYSE: price discovery for Mexican shares," Journal of International Financial Markets, Institutions and Money, Elsevier, vol. 14(4), pp. 295–311.
2. George M. von Furstenberg & Jianjun Wei, 2002. "The Chinese crux of monetary union in East Asia," Paper to be delivered at a G8 Research Group Conference Calgary, June 22, 2002.
3. George M. von Furstenberg 2001. "Hopes and delusions of transparency1," The North American Journal of Economics and Finance, Elsevier, vol. 12(1), pp. 105–120.
4. George M. von Furstenberg, 2001. "Pressures for currency consolidation in insurance and finance: Are the currencies of financially small countries on the endangered list?," Journal of Policy Modeling, Elsevier, vol. 23(3), pp. 321–331.
5. George M. von Furstenberg, 2000. "Implications of changes in transparency in civilian and military spheres," Paper prepared for the symposium, The Kyushu-Okinawa Summit: The Challenges and Opportunities for the Developing World in the 21st Century, Tokyo, Japan, July 17, 2000.
6. Alexander, Volbert & George M. von Furstenberg, 2000. "Monetary unions--a superior alternative to full dollarization in the long run," The North American Journal of Economics and Finance, Elsevier, vol. 11(2), pp. 205–225.
7. "A Case Against U.S. Dollarization," Challenge: The Magazine of Economic Affairs, July/August 2000, pp. 108–121.
8. George M. von Furstenberg, 1998. "Price Stability: How Canada's Governor Crow Approached It," Journal of Policy Modeling, Elsevier, vol. 20(3), pp. 335–360
9. von Furstenberg, George M. & Fratianni, Michele, 1996. "Indicators of financial development," The North American Journal of Economics and Finance, Elsevier, vol. 7(1), pages 19–29. [Downloadable!]
10. George M. von Furstenberg & Joseph P. Daniels, 1992. "Can you trust G-7 promises?," International Economic Insights 3 September/October 1992, pp. 24–27.

=== Books ===
- Learning from the World's Best Central Bankers: Principles and Policies for Subduing Inflation, George M. von Furstenberg and Michael K. Ulan. Dordrecht NL: Kluwer Academic Publishers, 1998. With foreword by Burton G. Malkiel. ISBN 0-7923-8303-6
- Monetary Unions and Hard Pegs: Effects on Trade, Financial Development, and Stability, V. Alexander, J. Mélitz, and G. M. von Furstenberg, eds., Oxford University Press, 2004. Foreword by Robert A. Mundell. ISBN 0-19-927140-2
