= Anymachen Tibetan Culture Center =

School in Qinghai, Tibet, China

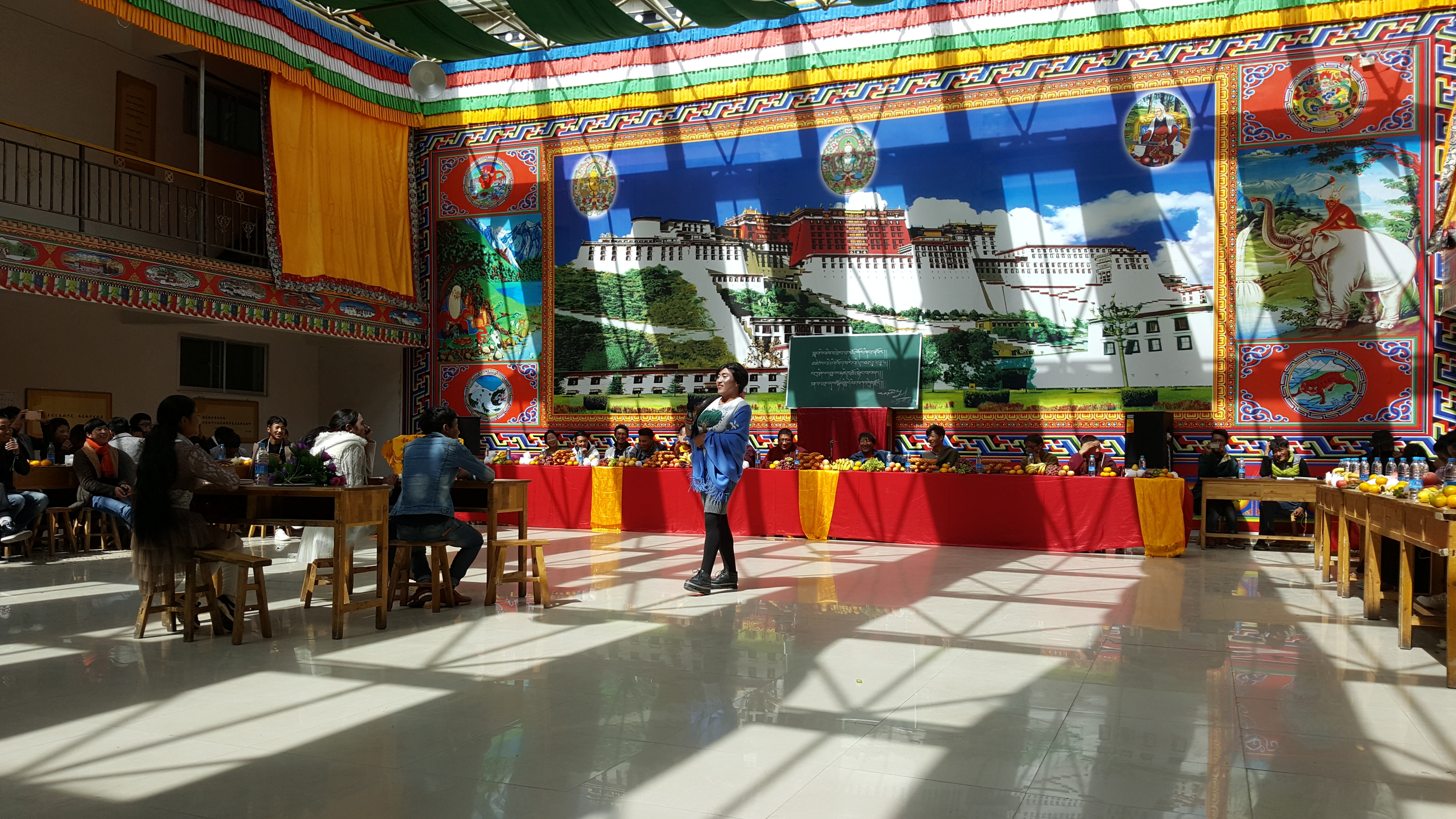
Students perform for teachers on Teachers' Day at Anymachen Tibetan Culture Center

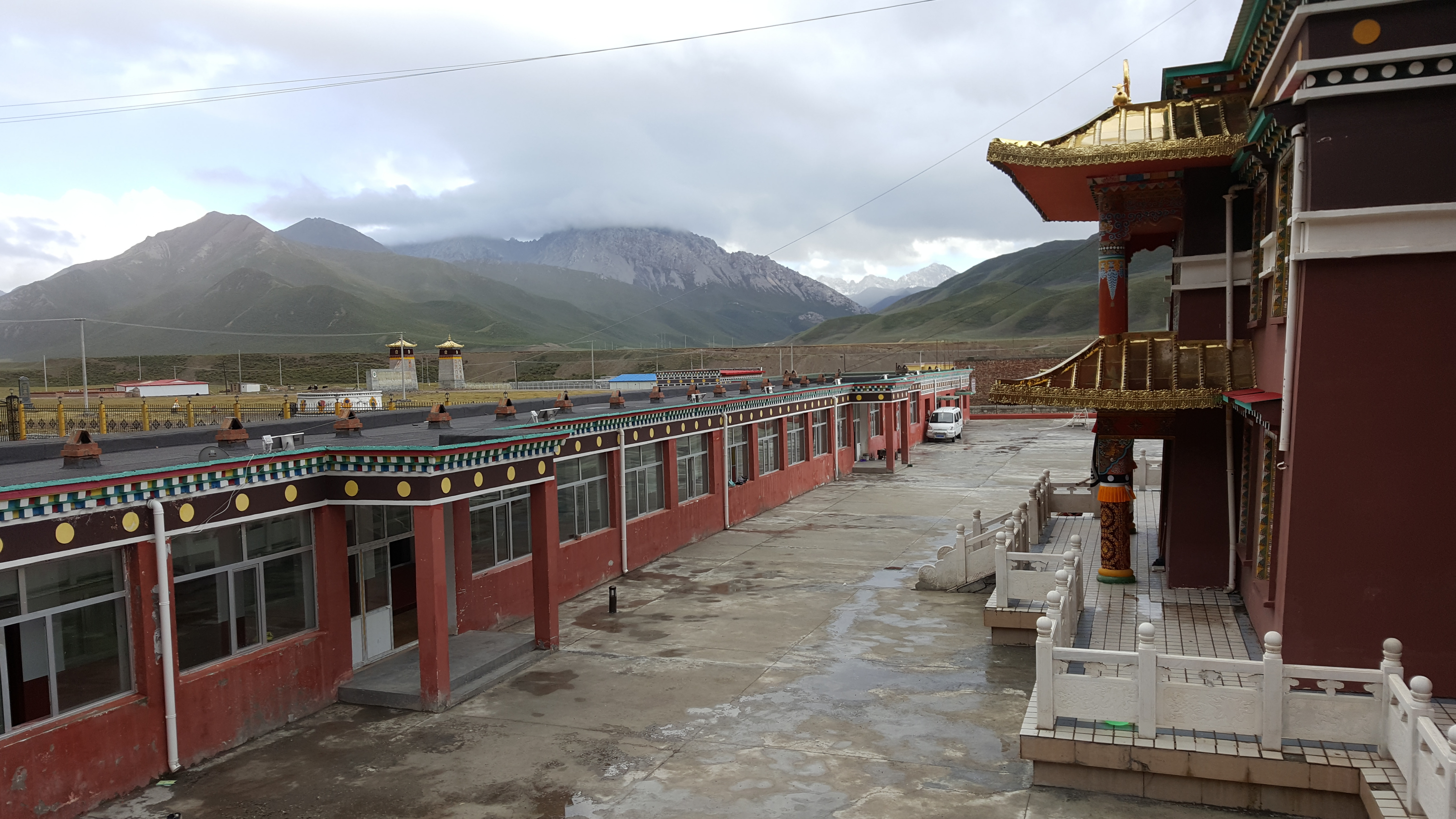
Anymachen Tibetan Culture Center consists of classrooms, dormitories for students and teachers, a dining hall, and an assembly hall, arranged around a multi-story Buddhist temple.

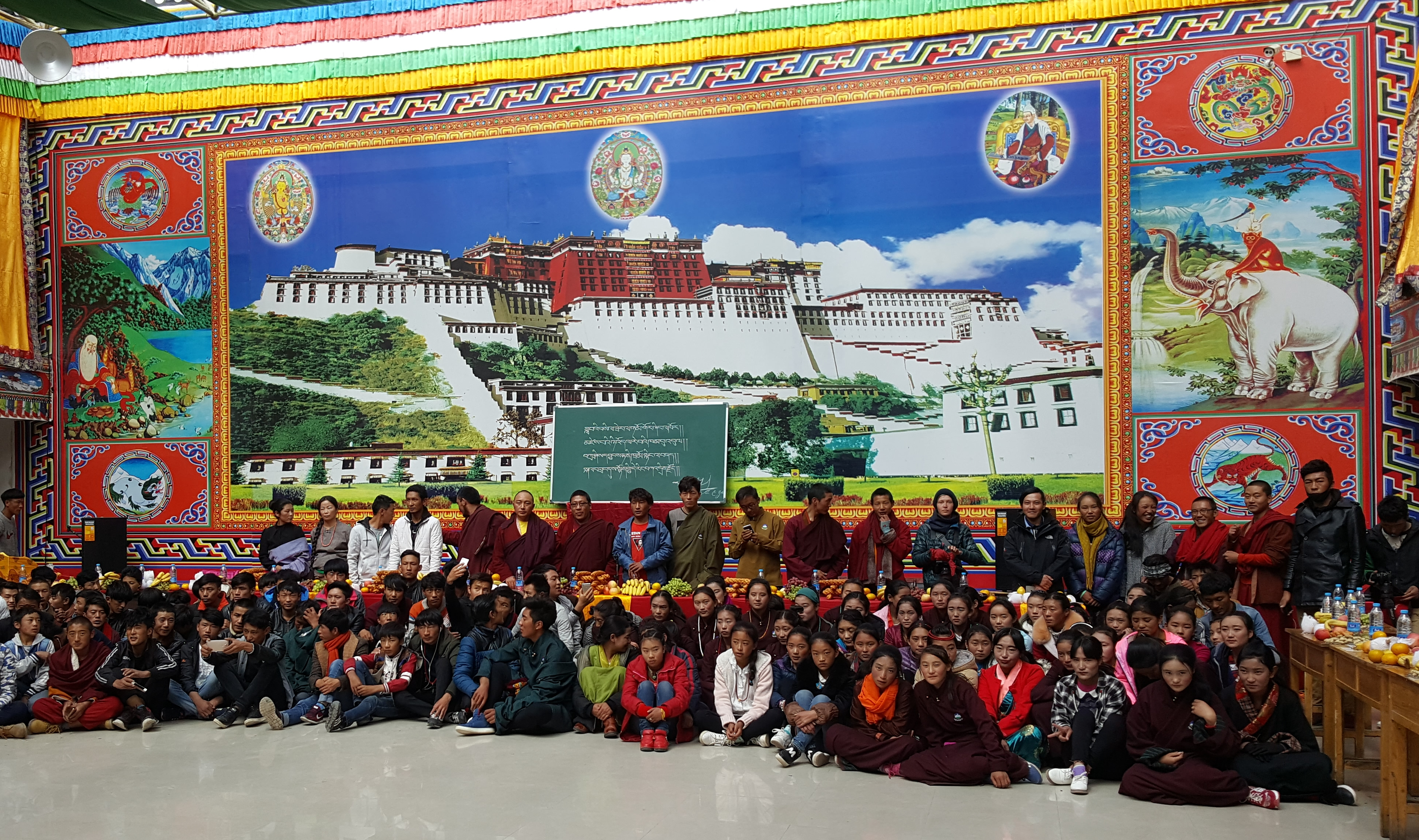
Students and teachers at Anymachen Tibetan Culture Center gather for a Teachers' Day group photo in 2016

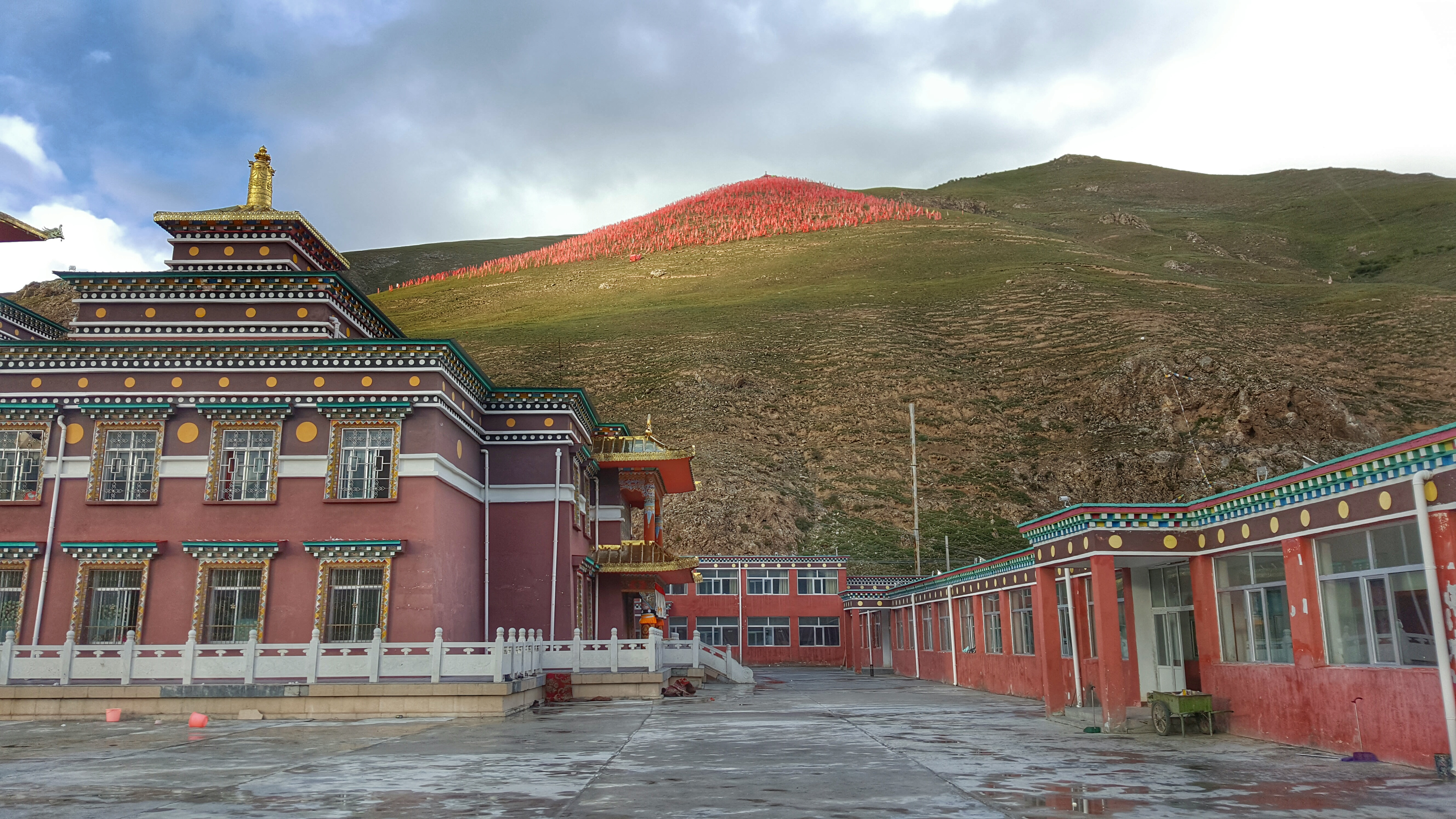
Anymachen Tibetan Culture Center main temple, assembly hall and dorms, in the town of Tawo Zholma (Xiadawu)

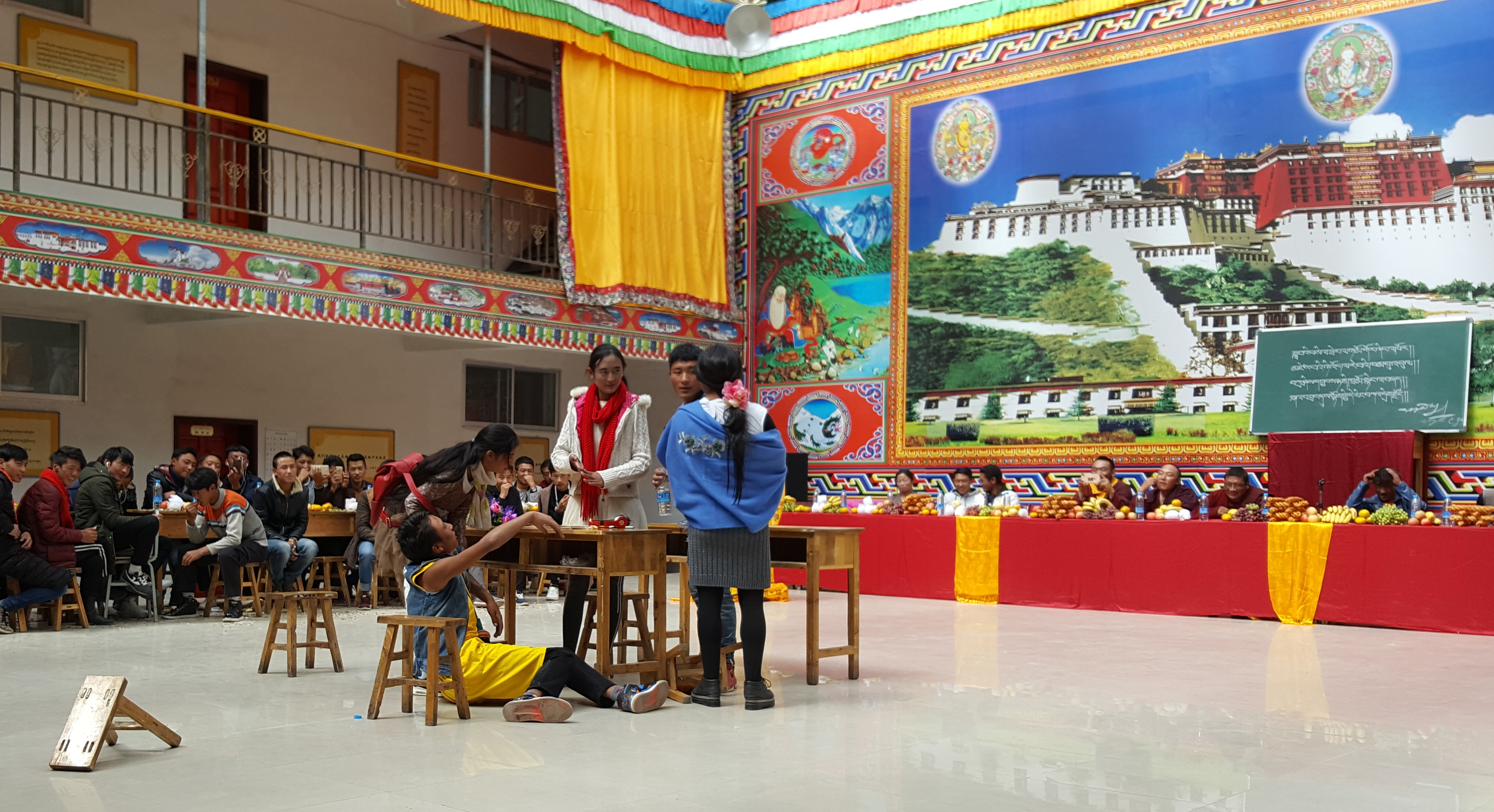
Students perform a humorous skit for teachers on Teachers' Day

The Anymachen Tibetan Culture Center is a school for boys in Qinghai, Tibet, China. It was founded in Zhandetan, a remote rural area near the town of Tawo Zholma, Xiaduwu Township, in Maqên County of the Golog Tibetan Autonomous Prefecture at the foot of a mountain glacier of the Amne Machin, by Tserin Lhagyal, Rinpoche of Guri Monastery, in the Nyingma tradition, who patiently cultivated Chinese officials over a period of years and gained permission to establish the school. Donations totaling $3 million were raised throughout China with 80% of the funds being donated by Han people who support Tibetan Buddhism. The small student body, young Tibetans from rural backgrounds, some orphans, study Tibetan language and culture, as well as Mandarin and English. A girls schools required fundraising and a separate building. As of 2016, both boys and girls were in attendance at the school.

== External links and further reading ==
- Qinghai Journey
