= The Oratory Preparatory School =

The Oratory Prep School

Location
- Goring Heath; Oxfordshire, RG8 7SF; England
- 51.51507°N 1.07944°W

Information
- Type: Private preparatory Day and boarding
- Motto: cor ad cor loquitor
- Religious affiliation: Roman Catholic (Oratorian)
- Established: 1925 (prep school); 1977 (pre-prep school)
- Founder: The Oratory School
- Local authority: Oxfordshire
- President: Lord Judge
- Headmaster: Andrew De Silva
- Gender: Co-educational
- Age: 2 to 13
- Enrollment: 330~
- Website: http://www.oratoryprep.co.uk/

The Oratory Prep School is a Catholic day and boarding school for some 330 boys and girls aged from two to thirteen, founded in 1925.

The school is co-educational and is separate from the nearby Oratory School, although they share a similar history.

== History ==
The Oratory School was founded on 1 May 1859 in Edgbaston, a suburb in Birmingham, "for the education of [Roman Catholic] boys not destined to ecclesiastical estate", meaning not aiming to become priests. In 1922, the original school moved to Caversham Park near Reading, which offered better accommodation.

In 1925, The Oratory Prep School was established with just four boys, at Rose Hill House, a Georgian-style country house in Emmer Green, less than a mile away from the main school. Its first Headmaster was Father Sebastian Ritchie, and by 1930 its numbers were up to thirty boys.

By 1941, the school, based at Caversham Park, was taking boys only between the ages of six and thirteen.

In 1941 Caversham Park was sold, and the prep school merged temporarily with Worth School, which was at Downside Abbey for the duration of the war. Two terms later, the Oratory School re-established itself for senior boys at Woodcote House, and three cottages in Exlade Street were used for classes for a few boys aged about 10 to 13, pending the re-establishment of a prep school.

In 1946, The Oratory Prep School re-opened at the Old Ryde, a fine house at Branksome Park, Poole, with 35 boys. The school moved to its current site in 1969, with sixty acres of grounds, amid open countryside and woodland overlooking the Thames Valley, close to Reading. In 1977, a new Pre-Preparatory Department opened, with 21 children, who included girls for the first time. Under a new headmaster, Michael Randell, who took over in 1981, the school developed further and became fully coeducational.

In 2019, the school became part of Bellevue Education.

== Present day ==
The school accepts children of all faiths, but still has close ties with the Roman Catholic church; Vincent Nichols, Archbishop of Westminster, sits on the Board of Governors, and Cardinal Baum was a member until his death in 2015. Children at the school are also expected to attend assemblies and weekly services.

The school is in South Oxfordshire, England, although it has a Reading postcode, and is within the area of the Oxfordshire County Council Local Education Authority.

== Curriculum ==
A majority of pupils sit the Common Entrance Examination and are accepted by nearby public schools such as Abingdon, Eton, Harrow, Marlborough, St Edward's School, Oxford, and Wellington.

== Boarding ==
Most children are day pupils, but the school makes provision for up to sixty boarders from Year 3 upwards Each room caters for up to five children with full-time, weekly and flexi boarders living and mixing together.

== Headmasters ==
- 1925–1938: Father Sebastian Ritchie
- 1938–1941: Ronald Richings
- The school merged with Worth during the Second World War
- 1946: Antony Patton
- 1952: Cyril Bull
- 1958: Christopher Maude
- 1969: P. J. G. Stow. M.A.
- 1977: George André Robertson
- 1981 - 1991: Michael Randell
- 1991 - 2006: David Sexon
- 2006 - 2010: Richard Hillier, later head of the Yehudi Menuhin School
- 2010 - 2017: Joseph Smith
- 2017 - 2022: Rob Stewart
- 2022 - 2026 Andrew De Silva
- 2026 William May

== Notable former pupils ==
- Jamie Salmon (b. 1959) - rugby player, New Zealand national rugby union team and England national rugby union team
- Tamara Taylor (b. 1981) - rugby player, England women's national rugby union team
- Tim Atkins - hockey player, Scotland men's national field hockey team
