= George André Robertson =

George André Robertson (8 September 1929, St Jean-de-Luz, France – 22 February 2007, Redhill, Surrey), was a British educator, headmaster and sportsman. An Old Amplefordian, he attended St Wilfrid's House (1943–1948) and was cricket captain in 1948 before attending Peterhouse, Cambridge (1949–1952).

== Cricketer ==
Robertson was a noted cricket player. He was in the 1st XI for all five years at the school, from his match on 14 May 1944 until his final match on 27 June 1948. In 1944, he won the Younghusband Cup for Best Bowler, taking 32 wickets for 308 runs, an average of 9.31, bowling in all 109.3 overs and 26 maidens. By 1947, his fourth year in the cricket team, he was described by the Ampleforth Journal [September 1947] as "probably the best bat in the eleven", but the journal hinted at a weakness by adding that he "might easily do great things when he has learnt better footwork".

In 1947 he took 30 wickets at 13.3. In his final season, 1948, he captained the XI. The Ampleforth Journal [September 1948] noted that "[George A.] Robertson became … the centre of the team and besides finishing at the head of the batting averages [32,44] was the mainstay of the bowling [average 10.34]", being awarded prizes as Best Cricketer [Downey Cup], Best All-Rounder and Highest Score. Robertson was Captain of the 1st XI in 1948, opening the batting and opening the bowling. He scored 100 retired in the first match, and in the season, he took 26 wickets at 10.47 each.

Robertson made two first-class appearances during the 1950 season, the first for Cambridge University and the second for Free Foresters Cricket Club against Cambridge University. He made his first-class debut against Hampshire and opening the bowling dismissed both Hampshire openers, finishing with figures of 2/53. The match was most notable for future England captain Peter May scoring an unbeaten double century for the university. The appearance for Free Foresters came three days later and Robertson took one further wicket.

== Teaching career ==
After Ampleforth, Robertson attended Peterhouse, Cambridge from 1949 to 1952, reading French and Spanish.

From 1952 to the mid-1980s and beyond to 1991, Robertson was a teacher and headmaster at several different preparatory schools. He joined the staff at Ladycross, at Seaford, Sussex, where he met his future wife. He taught at St Edmund's School, Hindhead, Surrey, and later at All Hallows, Cranmore, Somerset.

From 1967 to 1977, he was Headmaster of St. Martin's School, Nawton, North Yorkshire, near Kirkbymoorside. [this has since amalgamated with Gilling Castle to form St. Martin’s, Ampleforth].

In 1977 he became Headmaster of the Oratory Prep School. When ill health forced him to give up that post, he became Headmaster of an English school in Algarve, Portugal. In the mid-1980s, Robertson became Secretary of a golf club at an RAF base in Germany.

In 1986 he joined the staff of the Modern Language Department at the Oratory, coaching also Under 14 cricket sides and helping to develop the school golf. The Oratory School Magazine (2006; issue #166) noted that he "was largely responsible for creating a very special family atmosphere, one which is still warmly remembered by former pupils to the present day". Some remember him less warmly: I always wondered what happened to him.

== Family ==
He married Joan Turnbull (died 1984) in the 1950s. They had three sons: Simon, Andrew and Peter. Their marriage was dissolved in 1983.

== Health problems and death ==
In 1991, health problems (such as Parkinson's disease) forced him to retire and he went to live in Surrey, where he died on 22 February 2007 at the East Surrey Hospital in Redhill at the age of 77.
