= George Macnamara =

Irish cricketer (1893–1916)

Personal information
- Full name: George Frederick Macnamara
- Born: June 1893; Dublin, Ireland
- Died: 18 August 1916 (aged 23); Loos-en-Gohelle, Pas-de-Calais, France
- Batting: Right-handed
- Bowling: Unknown-arm medium

Domestic team information
- Years: Team
- 1913: Ireland

Career statistics
Competition	First-class
Matches	1
Runs scored	54
Batting average	54.00
100s/50s	–/–
Top score	30
Balls bowled	78
Wickets	0
Bowling average	–
5 wickets in innings	–
10 wickets in match	–
Best bowling	–
Catches/stumpings	1/–
- Source: CricketArchive, 3 November 2018

George Frederick Macnamara (June 1893 – 18 August 1916) was an Irish first-class cricketer.

Macnamara was born at Dublin in June 1893 to Richard and Mary Macnamara, with Richard being a prominent solicitor. He was one of six children. He was sent to England for his education, where he attended The Oratory School, one of England's leading Catholic schools. From there, he went up to New College, Oxford. He played cricket for his college, but was not selected to represent Oxford University Cricket Club. He did however play football for Oxford University, which earned him a half blue. During the summer break, Macnamara would return to Ireland, where he played club cricket for Leinster. He made one appearance in first-class cricket for Ireland against Scotland at Edinburgh in 1913. Batting twice in the match, Macnamara scored 30 runs in Ireland's first-innings, before being dismissed by Lovat Fraser, while in their second-innings he ended unbeaten on 24. He also bowled 13 wicket-less overs across both Scotland innings. He graduated from New College in 1914, with a fourth-class degree in history.

Macnamara served in the British Army during World War I, enlisting with the Royal Dublin Fusiliers as a second lieutenant (on probation) in August 1915. He had some previous military experience when he was a member of the Officers' Training Corps at Oxford University. He was confirmed in the rank of second lieutenant in April 1916. He was killed in action during the Battle of the Somme on 18 August 1916, while defending a salient near Loos-en-Gohelle. He is buried at the Philisophe British Cemetery at Mazingarbe.
