= Michael Roberts (cricketer) =

English cricketer

Personal information
- Full name: Michael David Tudor Roberts
- Born: 13 March 1989 (age 37); Oxford, Oxfordshire, England
- Batting: Right-handed
- Bowling: Right-arm off break

Domestic team information
- Years: Team
- 2006–2012: Berkshire
- 2012: Unicorns
- 2013: Hampshire (squad no. 13)

Career statistics
| Competition | First-class | List A |
|---|---|---|
| Matches | 3 | 1 |
| Runs scored | 81 | 4 |
| Batting average | 27.00 | 4.00 |
| 100s/50s | 0/0 | 0/0 |
| Top score | 44 | 4 |
| Catches/stumpings | 0/– | 0/– |
- Source: Cricinfo, 29 July 2013

Michael David Tudor Roberts (born 13 March 1989) is an English cricketer.

Roberts was born at Oxford in March 1989. He was educated at The Oratory School, before matriculating to the University of Bath. Roberts made his debut in minor counties cricket for Berkshire against Dorset in the 2006 Minor Counties Championship. His first spell in minor counties cricket with Berkshire lasted until 2012, with him making fourteen appearances in the Minor Counties Championship and seven in the MCCA Knockout Trophy. While playing for Berkshire in the 2011 Minor Counties Championship against Herefordshire, Roberts made a double century with a score of 205, sharing in a partnership of 371 for the first wicket with Jono McLean (210); their partnership of 371 remains as of 2026 the highest ever for Berkshire.

During this time he also played Second XI cricket for both Middlesex and Hampshire. In 2012, he was selected to play for the Unicorns in the 2012 Clydesdale Bank 40, making his List A debut in the competition against Derbyshire. Opening the batting for the Unicorns, Roberts made 4 runs before he was dismissed by Tim Groenewald.

On 4 October 2012 Roberts was offered a full contract by Hampshire after excelling in the Second XI team during the 2012 season scoring 610 runs at an average of 58.10. He made his first-class debut for the county the following season against Loughborough MCCU.
