= Niccolo d'Ardia Caracciolo =

Irish artist (1941 - 1989)

Niccolo Caracciolo
- Born: Niccolo d'Ardia Caracciolo; 18 September 1941; Dublin, Ireland
- Died: 16 December 1989 (aged 48)
- Known for: painter

Niccolo d'Ardia Caracciolo RHA (September 18, 1941 – December 16, 1989), known as Niccolo or Nick Caracciolo, was an Irish artist known for his portraits and landscapes.

== Early life and family ==
Born in Dublin on 18 September 1941, he was the only son of Ferdinando Caracciolo, Prince of Cursi, a member of an old Italian family, originally from Naples. His mother was Mary Purcell-Fitzgerald of The Island, near Waterford, now Waterford Castle, where he was reared. The artist Maria Levinge is his sister, who he tutored in art. He had another sister, Francesca.

After being educated at The Oratory School in Woodcote, England, he went to Florence at the age of 19 to study art at the Accademia di Belle Arti di Firenze at the suggestion of Pietro Annigoni, studying under Signorina Nera Simi. He continued to keep a house in Tuscany for the rest of his life, travelling back and forth to Ireland.

== Career ==
In 1964 Caracciolo was one of the painters chosen to paint a replica of the Sistine Chapel for the scenery of the 1965 film The Agony and the Ecstasy, on the life of Michelangelo. Becoming a noted portrait painter, among those who sat for him were Lord Iveagh, J. P. Donleavy, Anthony Bygraves, and Sir Marc Cochrane.

From 1975 to 1978 he lived at Rosemount House, near Moate, County Westmeath, where he painted many scenes of the surrounding countryside and exhibited at the Lad Lane Gallery in Dublin in 1978. He also exhibited at the Holly Solomon Gallery in New York.

In 1983 he became an associate Member of the Royal Hibernian Academy and in 1984 a full member of the Royal Hibernian Academy.

== Death and legacy ==
Caracciolo died near Siena, Italy in a road accident on 16 December 1989. He is buried at Calvary Cemetery Bunclody, County Wexford. The Don Niccolo d'Ardia Caracciolo RHA Medal and Award is awarded in his memory.
