= Francis French, 7th Baron de Freyne =

Anglo-Irish aristocrat

Francis Arthur John French, 7th Baron de Freyne of Coolavin, County Sligo (3 September 1927 – 24 November 2009) was an Anglo-Irish aristocrat, son of Francis French, 6th Baron de Freyne and Lina Victoria (née Arnott). He was educated at Ladycross School (Seaford, East Sussex) and at Glenstal Abbey School (County Limerick).

He inherited his title in 1935, at which time, until 1999, he could vote in the House of Lords. In 1999, all but 90 or so hereditary peers were stripped of voting rights in the Lords by Tony Blair's Labour government. Lord de Freyne was a Knight of the Sovereign Military Order of Malta.

In 1952, Lord de Freyne sold French Park, the family's ancestral home in Frenchpark, County Roscommon. Due to the successive Irish Land Acts, the remaining estate lands proved too small to sustain the running of the estate and the "Big House". The great house and demesne had been in the French family since 5,000 acres (20 km^{2}) were granted to Dominick French in 1666; prior to its dissemination during the Land Acts the estate comprised 36,000 acres (150 km^{2}). Having sold the estate, the family moved to Oxfordshire.

== Marriages & children ==
He married, firstly, Shirley Ann Pobjoy, daughter of Douglas Rudolph Pobjoy, on 30 January 1954; that union ended in divorce in 1978. He married, secondly, to Sheelin Deidre O'Kelly, daughter of Lt.-Col. Henry Kane O'Kelly, of County Wicklow, in July 1978.

By his first wife, Lord De Freyne had three children;

- Fulke Charles Arthur John French, 8th Baron de Freyne (b. 21 April 1957)
- Hon. Vanessa Rose Bradbury French (b. 19 September 1958)
- Hon. Patrick Dominic Fitzstephen Jude (b. 27 November 1969)

== Arms ==
Coat of arms of Francis French, 7th Baron de Freyne
Crest A dolphin embowed Proper. Escutcheon Ermine a chevron Sable. Supporters Dexter an ancient Irish warrior habited supporting with his dexter hand a battle-axe head downwards and bearing on his sinister arm a shield all Proper sinister a female figure Proper vested and scarf flowing Argent. Motto Malo Mori Quam Foedari (I Had Rather Die Than Be Disgraced)

Peerage of the United Kingdom
Preceded by Francis French	Baron de Freyne; 1935–2009	Succeeded by Charles French
