= Amne Machin =

Mountain in Qinghai, Tibet, China

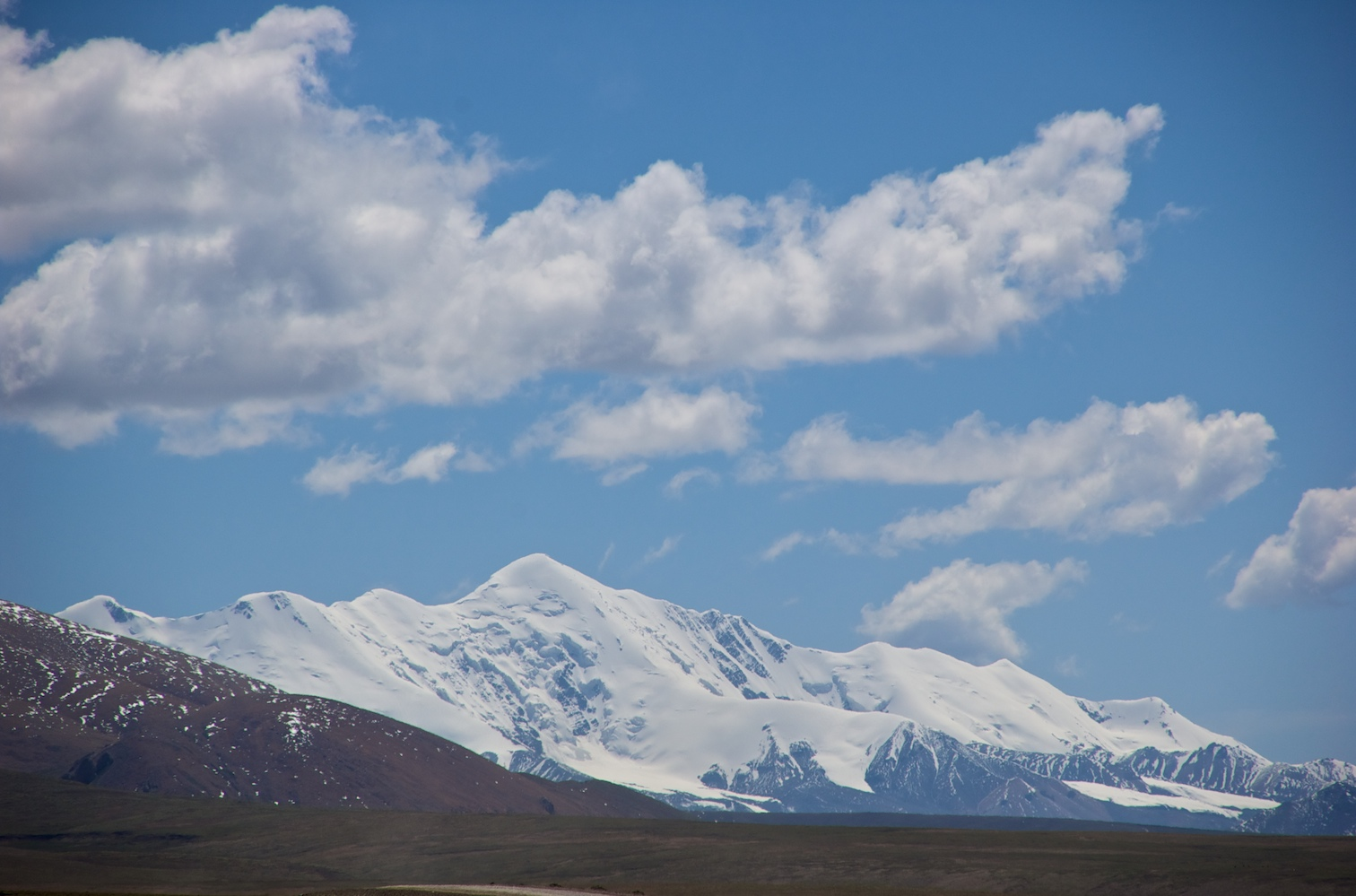
- Amne Machin II (Maqen Gangri), July 2008

Highest point
- Elevation: 6,282 m (20,610 ft)
- Prominence: 1,960 m (6,430 ft)
- Listing: List of mountains in China
- Coordinates: 34°47′54″N 99°27′45″E

Geography
- Location within Qinghai Location within China
- Location: Xueshan Township [zh], Maqên County, Golog Prefecture, Qinghai, China
- Parent range: Kunlun Mountains

Climbing
- First ascent: Amne Machin I: May 1981, Japanese expedition Amne Machin II: 1960, Beijing Institute of Geology expedition

Amne Machin

Chinese name
- Traditional Chinese: 阿尼瑪卿
- Simplified Chinese: 阿尼玛卿
Transcriptions
Standard Mandarin
- Hanyu Pinyin: Āní Mǎqīng
- Wade–Giles: A-ni Ma-ch‘ing

Tibetan name
- Tibetan: ཨ་མྱེ་རྨ་ཆེན།
Transcriptions
- Wylie: A-mye Rma-chen
- Tibetan Pinyin: Anyê Maqên

Amne Machin, Anyi Machen, or Anyê Maqên ("Grandfather Pomra") is the highest peak of a mountain range of the same name in the southeast of Qinghai province, China. It is revered in Tibetan Buddhism as the home of the chief indigenous deity of Amdo, Machen Pomra.

== Geography ==
The entire Amne Machin range is an eastern extension of the Kunlun Mountains, a major mountain system of Asia. The Amne Machin range runs in the general northwest-to-southeast direction in eastern Qinghai (Golog Tibetan Autonomous Prefecture and the adjacent areas of the Hainan Tibetan Autonomous Prefecture) and the southwestern corner of Gansu's Gannan Tibetan Autonomous Prefecture.

The existence of the ridge results in one of the great bends of the Yellow River. The river first flows for several hundreds of kilometers toward the east and southeast, along the southwestern side of the Amne Machin Range. In so doing it crosses the entire length of Golog Prefecture, and reaches the borders of Gansu and Sichuan. Then the river turns almost 180 degrees to the left, passing to the northeastern side of the Amne Machin, and flows toward the northwest for 200 to 300 kilometers (120 to 190 miles) through several prefectures of the northeastern Qinghai.

The Amne Machin Peak (the highest point of the range) is located in Maqên County of Golog Prefecture. Its elevation is estimated at 6,282 metres (20,610 ft).

A part of the range around its highest peak has been declared a section of the Sanjiangyuan ("Sources of Three Rivers") National Nature Reserve.

== History ==
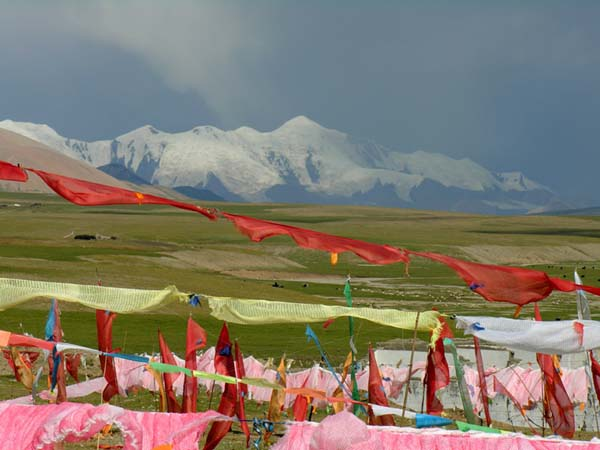
The Anye Machin Peak

The mountain was known to the ancient Chinese as Mount Jishi (積石山, 积石山, Jīshíshān). The Northern Wei-era commentary on the Han-era River Classic stated that the mountain was the site where Yu the Great tamed the Yellow River and that it was considered part of Longxi Commandery, located 1740 li (724 km or 449.9 mi) from Kunlun Mountain and 5000 li (2,080 km or 1,292 mi) from the Luo.

The massif had long been considered a sacred mountain and a place of pilgrimage, when before the Communist takeover up to 10,000 Golok people would make the 120-mile (193 km) circumambulation of the mountain each year. The first European to describe the mountain was the British explorer Brigadier-General George Pereira on his expedition on foot from Peking to Lhasa of 1921–1922, sometimes reckoned one of the great geographical discoveries of the twentieth century. Pereira, who saw Amne Machin from about 70 miles (113 km) away, thought its "height must be at least 25,000 feet [7,600 m], and might be anything; it dwarfed all other mountains near it."

However, the massif remained unclimbed until 1960. The Amne Machin mountains had been overflown by a few American pilots who overestimated the elevation to 30,000 feet (9,100 m). A 1930 article of National Geographic estimated the peak elevation to be 28,000 feet [8,500 m] according to the report of Joseph Rock, an American botanist and explorer who, despite death threats from the Golog Tibetans, had ventured to within 80 km (50 mi) of the mountain. For a while, the mountains were considered as a possible place for a peak higher than Mount Everest.

In 1948 an Associated Press journalist participated in a lengthy flyover; his airliner's Chinese pilot was American-born Moon Chin, who had flown "over the Hump" during World War II. Chin's instrumentation included radar and four altimeters; the mountain's altitude measurement, made "as we flew less than 100 feet [30 meters] above its summit," was "over 20,400 feet [6,220 meters]."

Joseph Rock downgraded his estimate publicly in 1956 to "not much more than 21,000 feet [6,400 meters]," he did give a detailed description of the peaks:

[T]he Am-nye Ma-Chhen Range has three prominent peaks; the southern pyramid (second highest) is called Spyan-ras-gzigs (Chenrezig), the Avalokitesvara, of which the Dalai Lama is believed to be an incarnation; the central lower peak, a smaller pyramid, Am-nye Ma-Chhen; and the northern, which is the highest, a huge, round, broad dome called dGra-hdul-rlung-shog (Dra-dul-lung-shog) Victor of enemies wind wing ... The dome in the north is the highest part, but it is not so imposing as the large pyramid at the southern end.

By 1980 Anyi Machen had been resurveyed at 6,282 metres (20,610 ft).

== Climbing history ==
In 1960, a Chinese expedition climbed the mountain, but it was demonstrated in 1980 that this expedition climbed Amne Machin II (Roche's Chenrezig), 6,268 meters (20,564 feet), 7 km (4.3 mi) south-southeast of the highest summit.

In 1981, Amne Machin I (Dradullunshog) was reached near-simultaneously by three groups, each of which had been led to believe they were the first and only ones to obtain a permit from the Chinese government. A Japanese expedition approached the summit from the south and put Giichiro Watanabe, Yoshio Yamamoto, and Katsumi Miyake on top on May 22, 1981, and five other expedition members three days later. Within three weeks, the American climbers Galen Rowell, Harold Knutsen and Kim Schmitz made an Alpine-style ascent over the east ridge of the northeastern summit to reach the main summit on June 9. They did not see any evidence of an earlier ascent. The very next day Siegfried Hupfauer, Hans Gaschbauer, Franz Lämmerhofer, Gerhard Schmatz and Peter Vogler of an Austro-German expedition reached the summit as well. They had followed the Japanese route and the 3,000 feet (914 m) of fixed rope they encountered en route convinced them that the Japanese had been the first to summit. The mountain remained busy that summer, as Kim Schmitz returned to the summit with two Canadian clients on June 12, another Japanese party summited in August, and in September an Australian team climbed the impressive northeast face and descended over the 6 km (3.7 mi) long unclimbed north-northeast ridge.

== In popular culture ==
- "Beyond the Great Snow Mountains", The Collected Short Stories of Louis L'Amour, Vol. 4, Part 1: Adventure Stories.
- Anymachen Tibetan Culture Center, a school in Maqên County

== See also ==
- List of ultras of Tibet, East Asia and neighbouring areas
