= Arthur French, 5th Baron de Freyne =

British and United States Army officer (1879–1915)

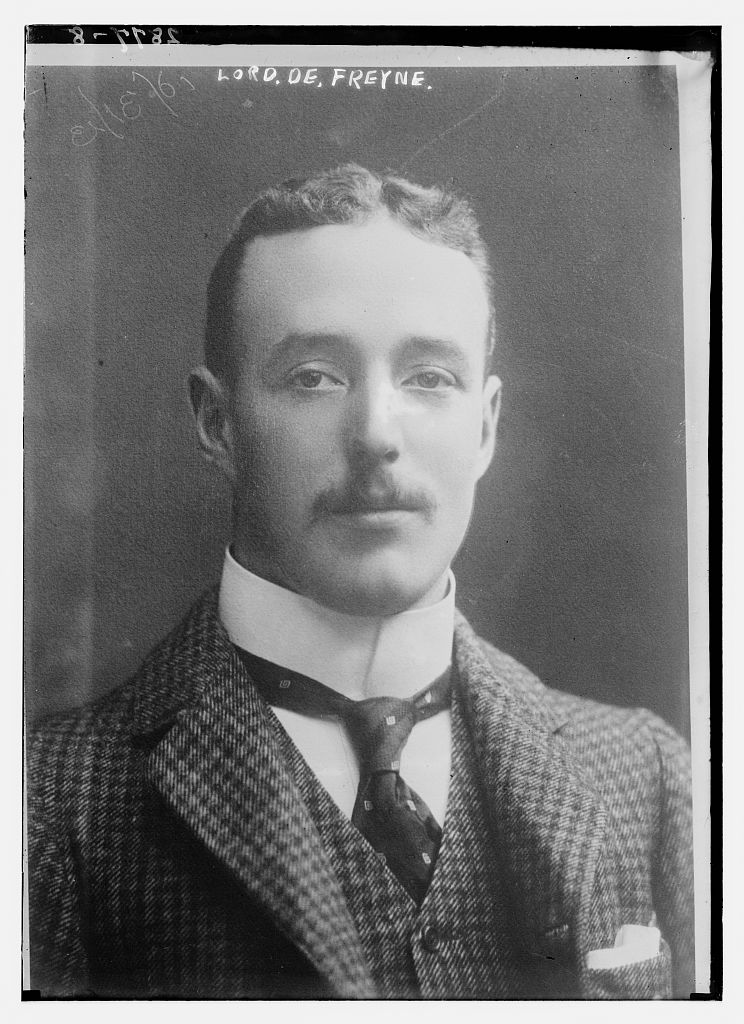

Arthur Reginald French, 5th Baron de Freyne (3 July 1879 – 9 May 1915) was Anglo-Irish military officer of the British Army who had also served in the ranks in the United States Army.

== Biography ==
He was born in London, to Arthur French of Frenchpark, County Roscommon (1855–1913), 4th Baron de Freyne, and his wife Lady Laura Octavia Dundas (died 1881).

A graduate of Sandhurst, French served as a lieutenant in the Royal Fusiliers from 1899 to 1901, and then in the Reserve of Officers until 1905. He enlisted for service with the Royal Garrison Regiment, but relinquished this appointment in June 1902.

In 1902, French's father cut him off financially when he married Annabelle Angus, the daughter of an innkeeper in Banffshire, Scotland, and the divorced wife of a brother officer, one Captain Alexander. The marriage was childless, though Annabelle brought a son to the marriage—Ronald True, who was convicted of murder in 1922 and spent the remainder of his life in Broadmoor Hospital.

Unable to keep himself in the style to which a British officer was accustomed, French resigned his commission. He sailed on the steamship Umbria for the United States, where he intended either to join the North-West Mounted Police or to travel to the ranch of his uncle William French in Frenchtown near Cimarron, New Mexico.

Landing in New York in mid-January 1905, French checked into the Hotel St. Denis at 799 Broadway at 11th. By the 19th he had disappeared from the hotel, leaving his substantial and expensive baggage behind. An uproar began, involving the New York City Police and the British consulate, which was widely reported in the press. In mid-February he was discovered nearby, at Fort Slocum, an island post in Long Island Sound just off New Rochelle. On 24 January he had enlisted as a private in the U.S. Army, and was assigned to A Company, the 8th Infantry Regiment at Slocum, where he had reported on 1 February. Known as “the Dook of Fort Slocum”, he was popular with the other troops, sponsoring dinners for his colleagues on the post by selling his civilian suits.

French remained with the regiment when it transferred to the Philippines, where he remained and enlisted several more times, although, contrary to legend, he remained a private throughout his American service. On 10 September 1913 his father died, and French inherited the title of Baron de Freyne, so in Mindanao on 19 October that year he purchased his way out of his American enlistment, a common and standard practice from 1890 to 1940.

French rejoined the British Army at the outbreak of the First World War and died on 9 May 1915, aged thirty-five, probably at about 16:00 hours, in the Battle of Aubers Ridge, fighting alongside his half-brother, the Hon. George Philip French, as a captain in the 3rd Battalion, South Wales Borderers. He is buried in the Cabaret-Rouge British Cemetery, Souchez, Pas-de-Calais, France.

He was succeeded as Baron de Freyne by another half-brother, Francis Charles French. His widow died in 1962.

== Arms ==
Coat of arms of Arthur French, 5th Baron de Freyne
Crest A dolphin embowed Proper. Escutcheon Ermine a chevron Sable. Supporters Dexter an ancient Irish warrior habited supporting with his dexter hand a battle-axe head downwards and bearing on his sinister arm a shield all Proper sinister a female figure Proper vested and scarf flowing Argent. Motto Malo Mori Quam Foedari (I Had Rather Die Than Be Disgraced)

Peerage of the United Kingdom
Preceded by Arthur French	Baron de Freyne; 1913–1915	Succeeded by Francis Charles French
