= Francis French, 6th Baron de Freyne =

Anglo-Irish hereditary peer

Francis Charles French, 6th Baron De Freyne DL (15 January 1884 – 24 December 1935) was an Anglo-Irish hereditary peer; he was a member of the House of Lords of the United Kingdom, and the Senate of Southern Ireland.

He was the son of Arthur French, 4th Baron de Freyne of Coolavin and Marie Georgiana Lamb. He married Lina Victoria Arnott, daughter of Major Sir John Alexander Arnott, 2nd Bt. and Caroline Sydney Williams, on 28 February 1916. He died at his home French Park, Frenchpark on 24 December 1935 at age 51.

He inherited the title Baron de Freyne in 1915. He was Deputy Lieutenant of County Roscommon and was also the High Sheriff in the County in 1912.

Lord de Freyne had one son; Francis Arthur John French, 7th Baron de Freyne of Coolavin (1927–2009).

== Arms ==
Coat of arms of Francis French, 6th Baron de Freyne
Crest A dolphin embowed Proper. Escutcheon Ermine a chevron Sable. Supporters Dexter an ancient Irish warrior habited supporting with his dexter hand a battle-axe head downwards and bearing on his sinister arm a shield all Proper sinister a female figure Proper vested and scarf flowing Argent. Motto Malo Mori Quam Foedari (I Had Rather Die Than Be Disgraced)

Peerage of the United Kingdom
Preceded by Arthur French	Baron de Freyne; 1915–1935	Succeeded by Francis French
