= Edward Pereira =

English cricketer, priest, and schoolmaster

The Revd Edward Thomas Pereira (26 September 1866 – 25 February 1939) was an English Catholic priest and schoolmaster, who played first-class cricket between 1895 and 1900 for Warwickshire and the Marylebone Cricket Club (MCC).

== Life ==
Born at Colwich, Staffordshire, to Eduardo Pereira (1817–1872) and the Hon. Margaret Stonor (1839–1894), he attended the Oratory School at Edgbaston. Influenced by Cardinal Newman, Pereira then became a Roman Catholic priest and schoolmaster. By 1910, Pereira was headmaster of the Oratory School and was in charge at the time of its move from Birmingham to Caversham, near Reading, where his family had owned property. He retired from the headmastership in 1930, being named as Warden in 1934, but was forced by ill health to retire to Birmingham Oratory in 1935 and died at Edgbaston, Warwickshire in 1939.

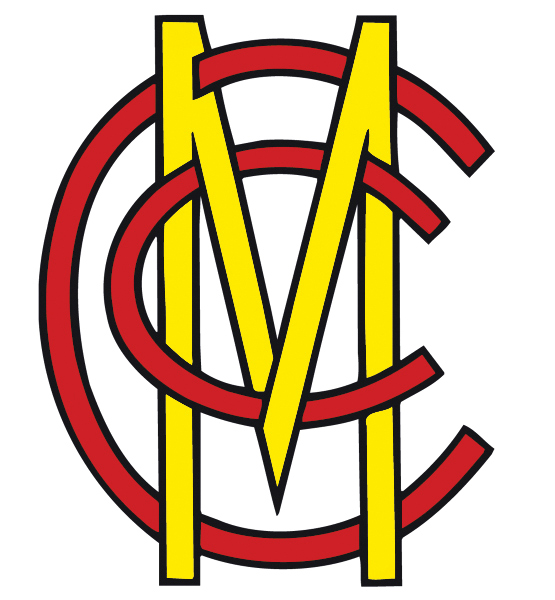

As a cricketer, Pereira was a right-handed middle order batsman; he also bowled right-arm fast, but only bowled two overs in first-class cricket. He played five times for Warwickshire in 1895 and 1896 and his best batting came in his first match, the game against Kent, when he top-scored with 34 in Warwickshire's first innings and made 24, just one behind Willie Quaife's 25, in the second. Against the 1896 Australians, Pereira was praised for his fielding, being rated as the finest fielder at point that the Australians had encountered. He played two games for MCC in 1900: in the first of these, he captained a team including Sir Arthur Conan Doyle against a London County side captained by Dr W. G. Grace.

His elder brother was George Pereira, the soldier and explorer, and his younger brother was Sir Cecil Pereira, also a distinguished soldier; both brothers were promoted generals.
