= George Pereira =

British Army general (1865–1923)

Brigadier-General George Pereira CB CMG DSO
- Born: 26 January 1865; Marylebone, London, England
- Died: 20 October 1923 (aged 58); Batang, Sichuan, Tibet
- Military career
- Allegiance: United Kingdom
- Branch: British Army
- Service years: 1884–1919
- Rank: Brigadier-General
- Nickname: "Hoppy"
- Unit: Grenadier Guards
- Commands: 43rd Brigade (1918); 47th Brigade (1916–1917); 1/4th (Denbighshire) Battalion, Royal Welsh Fusiliers
- Conflicts: Boxer Rebellion; Second Boer War; First World War
- Awards: Companion of the Order of the Bath; Companion of the Order of St Michael and St George; Distinguished Service Order; Croix de guerre (France)

Brigadier-General George Edward Pereira, CB, CMG, DSO (26 January 1865 – 20 October 1923) was a British Army officer, writer, diplomatist, and explorer in Central Asia, Tibet and Western China.

== Early life and family ==
George Pereira was descended from an old Roman Catholic family of Portuguese origins, which had profited in the 19th century from the Chinese trade, notably in Macao. He was eldest of the three sons of Edward Pereira by the Hon. Margaret Anne Stonor, eighth daughter of Thomas Stonor, 3rd Baron Camoys of Stonor Park, Oxfordshire. He was educated at The Oratory School in Edgbaston, where his younger brother Edward Pereira ('E.P.') (1866–1939) was later principal and benefactor. A third brother was Major General Sir Cecil Pereira (1869–1942), a distinguished commander in the Second Boer War and the First World War.

== Military career ==
George Pereira was commissioned into the Grenadier Guards as a lieutenant on 23 August 1884, and was promoted to captain on 4 November 1896.

Promoted to major on 2 May 1900, he served in China (1900) with the 1st Chinese Regiment, where he received the Distinguished Service Order (DSO) for his services during the Boxer Rebellion.

In April 1902 he was in charge of bringing to South Africa a reinforcement of 500 officers and men of the Grenadier Guards for the 2nd and 3rd battalions of the regiment, serving there during the Second Boer War. The war ended shortly after their arrival, in June 1902, and he returned home with other men of the 2nd Battalion on the SS Galeka in October 1902.

He became a military attaché in September 1905 and received a temporary promotion to lieutenant colonel whilst holding this appointment. By now a major, he retired from the army in July 1909.

In September 1913 he was promoted to lieutenant colonel.

During the First World War, he served on the Western Front as commanding officer (CO) of the 1/4th (Denbighshire) Battalion, Royal Welch Fusiliers, the pioneer battalion of the 47th (1/2nd London) Division) and was then promoted to be general officer commanding (GOC) of the 47th Infantry Brigade and was granted the temporary rank of brigadier general while employed in this role. This was a post he held from January 1916 to November 1917, during which time he was promoted to brevet colonel in June 1916, and then took over the 43rd Infantry Brigade in 1918. He was reputed to be one of the great characters of the 16th (Irish) Division, of which his 47th Brigade formed a part. Known to the men as "Hoppy" because of lameness after a riding accident, he was nevertheless an irascible fire-eater in addition to being a firm disciplinarian; characteristics he combined with an obvious concern for the welfare of his men. "Every officer and soldier of his brigade swears by him", one of his battalion commanders wrote.

== Explorer ==
Pereira had served as British military attaché in Peking from 1905 to 1910 and was fluent in Chinese. He made many adventurous journeys in China and Tibet, frequently travelling thousands of miles on foot. He was the first European to walk from Peking to Lhasa, when he described the Amne Machin massif in eastern Tibet in 1921–2, sometimes reckoned among the great geographical discoveries of the twentieth century.

His journey from Yunnan along the Tibetan border in 1923 was his last, as he died of some internal trouble just before reaching Kantze (where he was buried), near Batang, Sichuan, in October 1923.

His journals of Chinese exploration were edited shortly after his death. Further extracts from his journals have been published recently (2004–) in the Guards' Magazine, edited by his great nephew, Edward Pereira.
