= Cecil Pereira =

British Army general (1869–1942)

Major-General Sir Cecil Pereira KCB CMG
- Born: 24 July 1869
- Died: 26 October 1942 (aged 73)
- Military career
- Allegiance: United Kingdom
- Branch: British Army
- Service years: 1890–1923
- Rank: Major-General
- Unit: Coldstream Guards
- Commands: 56th (London) Infantry Division; 2nd Division; 1st Guards Brigade; 85th Brigade; 2nd Battalion, Coldstream Guards
- Conflicts: Second Boer War; First World War
- Awards: Knight Commander of the Order of the Bath; Companion of the Order of St Michael and St George; Commander of the Order of the Brilliant Star of Zanzibar; Commander of the Order of the Crown (Belgium); Croix de guerre (France)

Major-General Sir Cecil Edward Pereira, KCB, CMG (24 July 1869 – 26 October 1942) was a British Army officer who commanded the 2nd Division during the First World War.

== Military career ==
Educated at the Oratory School, Edgbaston, and later at the Royal Military College, Sandhurst, Pereira was commissioned into the Coldstream Guards in January 1890. He was promoted to lieutenant in July 1893 and was seconded for service under the Foreign Office in January 1898, and served in Uganda from 1898 and was promoted to captain in April 1899.

He was seconded for service in the Second Boer War in South Africa in March 1900, and attached to the Rhodesian Field Force.

Promoted in November 1905 to major, on 1 April 1908 he was made a deputy assistant adjutant general (DAAG) with a Territorial Force (TF) unit.

He was promoted to lieutenant colonel in November 1913 and then served in the First World War and was appointed commanding officer (CO) of the 2nd Battalion, Coldstream Guards in 1914. In February 1915 he was promoted to brevet colonel and in May was granted the temporary rank of brigadier general when he was placed in command of the 85th Infantry Brigade, which he led at the Battle of Loos in September–October that year. This was followed by his taking command of the 1st Guards Brigade in January 1916, before being promoted to temporary major general in December 1916 and being made general officer commanding (GOC) of the 2nd Division. His substantive rank was advanced from brevet colonel to colonel in November 1917, while his major general's rank became permanent in June 1918.

After the war he became General Officer Commanding 56th (London) Infantry Division from 1919 until his retirement from the army in June 1923.

During the Second World War Pereira commanded the Local Defence Volunteers in London.

== Family ==
Pereira had two brothers, George Pereira, a soldier and explorer, and Edward Pereira, a priest, schoolmaster and cricketer.

He was married by his brother at Brompton Oratory on 28 January 1903 to Helen Mary Josephine (Nellie) Lane Fox, daughter of George Lane-Fox; they had three sons and two daughters. They settled after 1924 at Caversham Place, near Reading, a house designed for him by Clough Williams-Ellis.

== Correspondence ==
His letters were edited by his grandson, E.A. Pereira & others, as Catholic General: The Private Wartime Correspondence of Maj-Gen Sir Cecil Edward Pereira, 1914–19 (Helion, 2020).

== Bibliography ==
- Davies, Frank; Maddocks, Graham (2014) [1995]. Bloody Red Tabs: General Officer Casualties of the Great War 1914–1918. Barnsley, South Yorkshire: Pen and Sword Books. ISBN 978-1-78346-237-7.

Military offices
Preceded by William Walker	GOC 2nd Division; 1916–1919	Succeeded by Richard Butler
Preceded by Charles Hull	GOC 56th (1st London) Division; 1919–1923	Succeeded by Sir Geoffrey Feilding
