= Peter Freyne =

American journalist

- Born: November 18, 1949; Bronx, New York City, New York
- Died: January 7, 2009 (aged 59); Burlington, Vermont
- Occupation: Journalist

Peter David Freyne (November 18, 1949 – January 7, 2009) was an American political journalist and columnist from the United States state of Vermont.
