= Baron de Freyne =

Title in the Peerage of the United Kingdom

Baron de Freyne, of Coolavin in the County of Sligo, is a title in the Peerage of the United Kingdom. It was created in 1851 for Arthur French, 1st Baron de Freyne, with remainder to his younger brothers John, Charles and Fitzstephen French. He had earlier represented County Roscommon in the House of Commons and later served as Lord Lieutenant of County Roscommon. French had already been created Baron de Freyne, of Artagh in the County of Roscommon, in 1839, also in the Peerage of the United Kingdom but with normal remainder to heirs male. Lord de Freyne was childless and on his death in 1856 the barony of 1839 creation became extinct. The barony of 1851 creation survives according to the special remainder by his younger brother John, the second Baron.

On his death, the title passed to another brother, Charles, the third Baron. In 1851 this Charles was married to Catherine Maree, daughter of Luke Maree, by a Catholic priest. Afterwards, a question arose as to the validity of the marriage with her being a Roman Catholic and he a Protestant and they were again married in 1854 in the Church of Ireland. By then they had had three sons, Charles French (MP; 1851–1925) (Member of Parliament for County Roscommon), John French (1853–1916) and William French (1854–1868). However, due to the uncertainty over the first marriage Lord de Freyne was succeeded by his eldest son born after the marriage of 1854, Arthur French, the fourth Baron. His eldest son, the fifth Baron, was killed in action at the Battle of Aubers Ridge in 1915. He was succeeded by his half-brother, the sixth Baron. As of 2017 the title is held by the latter's grandson, the 8th Baron, who succeeded his father in 2009.

The French family is descended from John French, of Frenchpark, County Roscommon, nicknamed An Tiarna Mór (the great landowner). He sat in the Irish House of Commons for Carrick, County Galway, and Tulsk. His son, Arthur French, represented County Roscommon in the Irish Parliament. His elder son, John French, was a member of the Irish Parliament for County Roscommon. He was about to be raised to the Peerage of Ireland as Baron Dangar in 1775 but died before the peerage was formally created. His younger brother, Arthur (1728–1799), member of the Irish Parliament for County Roscommon, refused the offer of the peerage originally intended for his brother. His son, Arthur French (d. 1820), was also a member of the Irish House of Commons for County Roscommon. His eldest son was the first Baron de Freyne. Fitzstephen French, youngest brother of the first Baron, was Member of Parliament for County Roscommon.

The family seat was French Park, also known as French Park House, on the outskirts of the village of Frenchpark, County Roscommon.

== Barons de Freyne; First creation (1839) ==
- Arthur French, 1st Baron de Freyne (1786–1856)

== Barons de Freyne; Second creation (1851) ==
- Arthur French, 1st Baron de Freyne (1786–1856)
- John French, 2nd Baron de Freyne (1788–1863)
- Charles French, 3rd Baron de Freyne (1790–1868)
- Arthur French, 4th Baron de Freyne (1855–1913)
- Arthur Reginald French, 5th Baron de Freyne (1879–1915)
- Francis Charles French, 6th Baron de Freyne (1884–1935)
- Francis Arthur John French, 7th Baron de Freyne (1927–2009)
- (Fulke) Charles Arthur John French, 8th Baron de Freyne (b. 1957)

== Arms ==
Coat of arms of Baron de Freyne
Crest A dolphin embowed Proper. Escutcheon Ermine a chevron Sable. Supporters Dexter an ancient Irish warrior habited supporting with his dexter hand a battle-axe head downwards and bearing on his sinister arm a shield all Proper sinister a female figure Proper vested and scarf flowing Argent. Motto Malo Mori Quam Foedari (I Had Rather Die Than Be Disgraced)

== See also ==
- Frenchpark
- Field Marshal Lord French
- Earl of Ypres
- Burkes Peerage

== Notes ==
=== Sources ===
- Hesilrige, Arthur G. M. (1921). Debrett's Peerage and Titles of courtesy. London: Dean & Son. p. 271.
- Kidd, Charles, Williamson, David (editors). Debrett's Peerage and Baronetage (1990 edition). New York: St Martin's Press, 1990,
- Leigh Rayment's Peerage Pages
