= Frenchpark =

Village in County Roscommon, Ireland

Frenchpark Dún Gar (Irish)
- Village
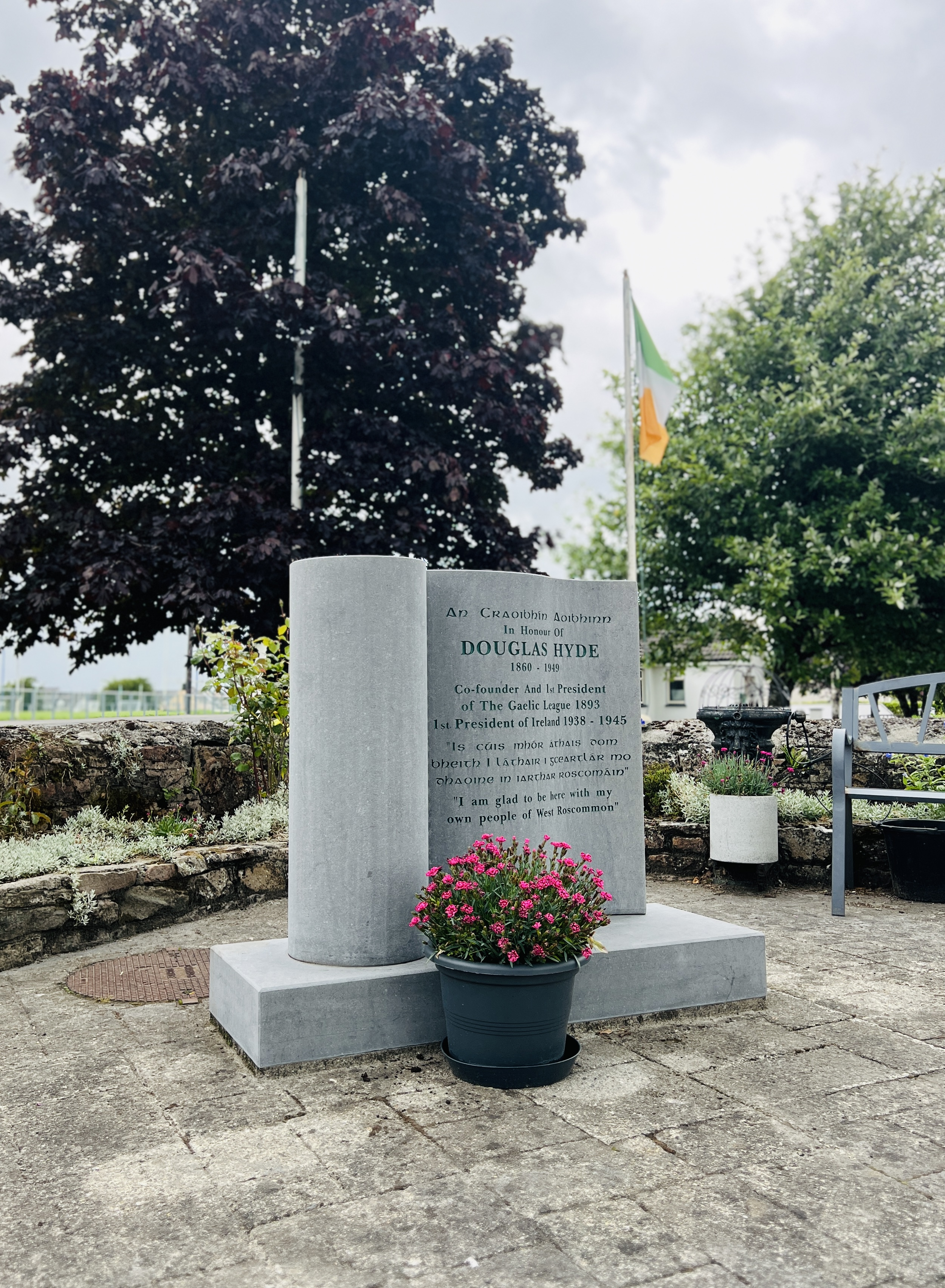
- The Hyde Monument at the crossroads within Frenchpark Village

- Location in Ireland
- Coordinates: 53°52′00″N 8°24′00″W
- Country: Ireland
- Province: Connacht
- County: County Roscommon
- Elevation: 82 m (269 ft)

Population (2022 Census of Ireland)
  - Total: 572
- Time zone: UTC+0 (WET)
  - Summer (DST): UTC-1 (IST (WEST))
- Irish grid reference: M737908

Frenchpark (Irish: Dún Gar) is a village in County Roscommon, Ireland, located at the junction of the N5 national primary road and the R361 regional road between Boyle and Castlerea. Frenchpark is associated with Douglas Hyde (1860–1949), the first President of Ireland and a leading figure in the Gaelic Revival, who spent much of his childhood in the village and later maintained a residence at nearby Ratra House.

The village takes its name from the French family, prominent landowners who settled in the area in the 17th century. Their estate, later known as Frenchpark House, influenced the development of the surrounding settlement until the early 20th century.

The area has documented prehistoric and medieval significance, including the remains of Cloonshanville Abbey. In the early modern period, Frenchpark developed as a regional market centre. Its strategic crossroads location supported agricultural trade and regular, nationally advertised fairs during the 18th and 19th centuries. Surviving historic structures include the 19th-century Market House and a smokehouse associated with the former Frenchpark demesne. A medieval stone cross, possibly dating to the 12th century, is also located near the abbey grounds.

== Etymology ==
The name Frenchpark was given by the French family of Galway, who acquired lands and settled in the area in the mid-17th century during the redistribution of property following the Cromwellian conquest. The estate became known as Frenchpark, and the name appears in surviving documentation from at least 1670, including the will of Dominick French, preserved in the National Library of Ireland.

The Irish name for the village is Dún Gar. According to the Placenames Database of Ireland, the name may be translated as “fort of favour” or “fort of grace.” The name appears in the Annals of Loch Cé, where it is associated with a castle and bawn in the medieval period. The Irish-language form remains in official usage.

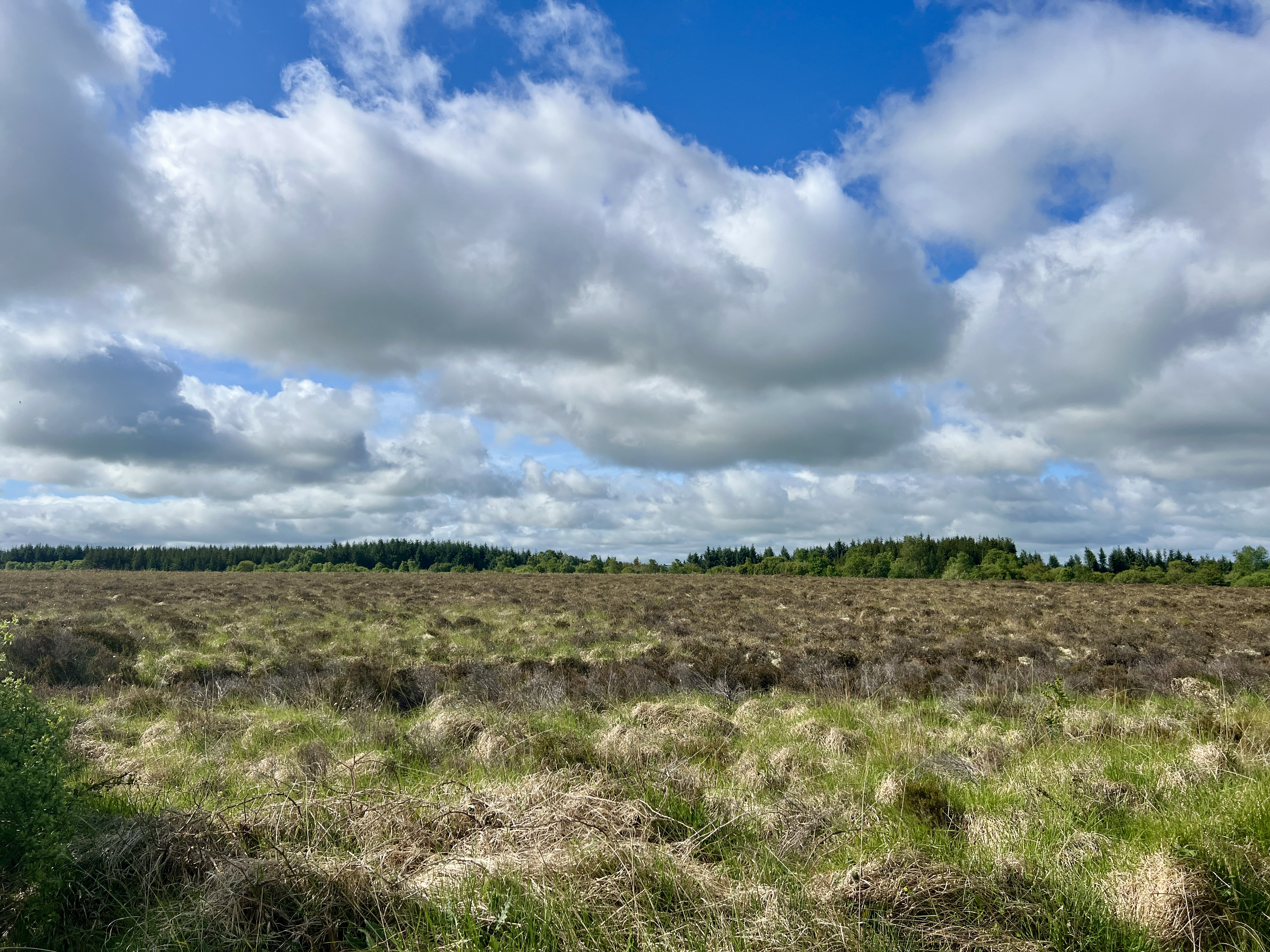
Boglands along Cloonshanville Road near Frenchpark

== Prehistory ==
=== Prehistoric Landscape ===
The area surrounding modern Frenchpark contains archaeological evidence of prehistoric activity. Recorded sites in the vicinity include fulachtaí fia (burnt mounds commonly associated with Bronze Age cooking), ringforts, souterrains and standing stones. Artefacts recovered in the wider area include metal objects and examples of bog butter, indicating sustained settlement and agricultural activity in prehistoric and early medieval periods.

Souterrains within the former Frenchpark demesne are recorded in the Archaeological Survey of Ireland. Local folklore associates some of these underground structures with druidic traditions, though no archaeological evidence supports a direct connection.

=== Iron Age and Ritual Landscape ===
The local topography around Frenchpark, rich in boglands, is consistent with wetland deposition practices documented across prehistoric and Iron Age Ireland. Archaeological scholarship recognises the deposition of wooden idols, animal remains and metal objects in waterlogged landscapes as part of ritual activity, often interpreted as occurring in liminal spaces associated with the Otherworld.

A major example of this tradition was uncovered in 2021 during excavations along the N5 near Rathcroghan, where archaeologists discovered the Gortnacrannagh Idol, a 2.5-metre carved wooden figure dated to approximately the fourth century AD. The figure was found preserved in a bog context alongside animal remains and associated materials interpreted as ritual deposits. The site lies approximately 13 km east of Frenchpark.

Although the idol was discovered outside the modern boundaries of the village, Frenchpark lies within the wider archaeological landscape centred on Rathcroghan (Crúachan), which has been described by archaeologists as an extensive ceremonial and settlement complex of Iron Age significance. The presence of prehistoric monuments and wetland sites in the surrounding area places Frenchpark within this broader cultural landscape.

== Early Christian and Medieval Period ==
The region encompassing modern Frenchpark and Tibohine formed part of the early medieval territory known as Crích Enna Airtigh, within the wider dynastic landscape of Ciarraighe Airtigh, located north of Cruachán (Rathcroghan). Control of this territory passed through branches of the Cíarraige and later Gaelic lineages including the Mac Donnchadha (Mac Donagh) and the MacDermot Gall, a cadet branch of the MacDermots of Moylurg. As elsewhere in medieval Ireland, political authority and ecclesiastical patronage were closely connected.

=== Teach Baoithín ===
The neighbouring townland of Tibohine (Irish: Tigh Baoithín), within the barony of Frenchpark, preserves the name of an early ecclesiastical foundation associated with a saint called Baoithín/Baithéne, and appears in the medieval Irish annals as an ecclesiastical site of note. In the early thirteenth century, the Annals of Ulster record the death of Diarmaid Mac Gilla Charraigh, described as erenagh of Tigh Baoithín, praised as an eminent priest noted for charity and hospitality. The same entry is recorded in the Annals of Connacht, naming him as aircindech Tige Baithin. These entries indicate Tibohine’s status as an established hereditary church centre in medieval Connacht.

The identity of the associated saint Baoithín is debated in historical sources. Some traditions identify him with Baithéne mac Brénaind, the successor of Colum Cille as abbot of Iona, while others distinguish a local Baoithín connected with Patrician foundations in the region. Modern scholarship suggests that these traditions may have become conflated over time, potentially reflecting efforts to align Tibohine with either Columban or Patrician ecclesiastical networks.

Douglas Hyde also collected material relating to the location and tradition of “Tigh Baoithín”; his notes are preserved in the National Library of Ireland.

=== Cloonshanville ===
Cloonshanville (Cluain Seanmhaol), near modern Frenchpark, is traditionally linked to early Christian foundations in the territory. In the 19th century, John O’Donovan, in the Ordnance Survey Letters, recorded local tradition identifying the site with a bishop named Connedus (Commedus), said to have been associated with St Patrick. Connedus is listed in the Acta Sanctorum Hiberniae among bishops connected with the education of St Cormac, son of Enna of Airtigh. By 1306, the site appears in papal taxation records of the Diocese of Elphin under the name Glynsennul, confirming its ecclesiastical status in the medieval period.

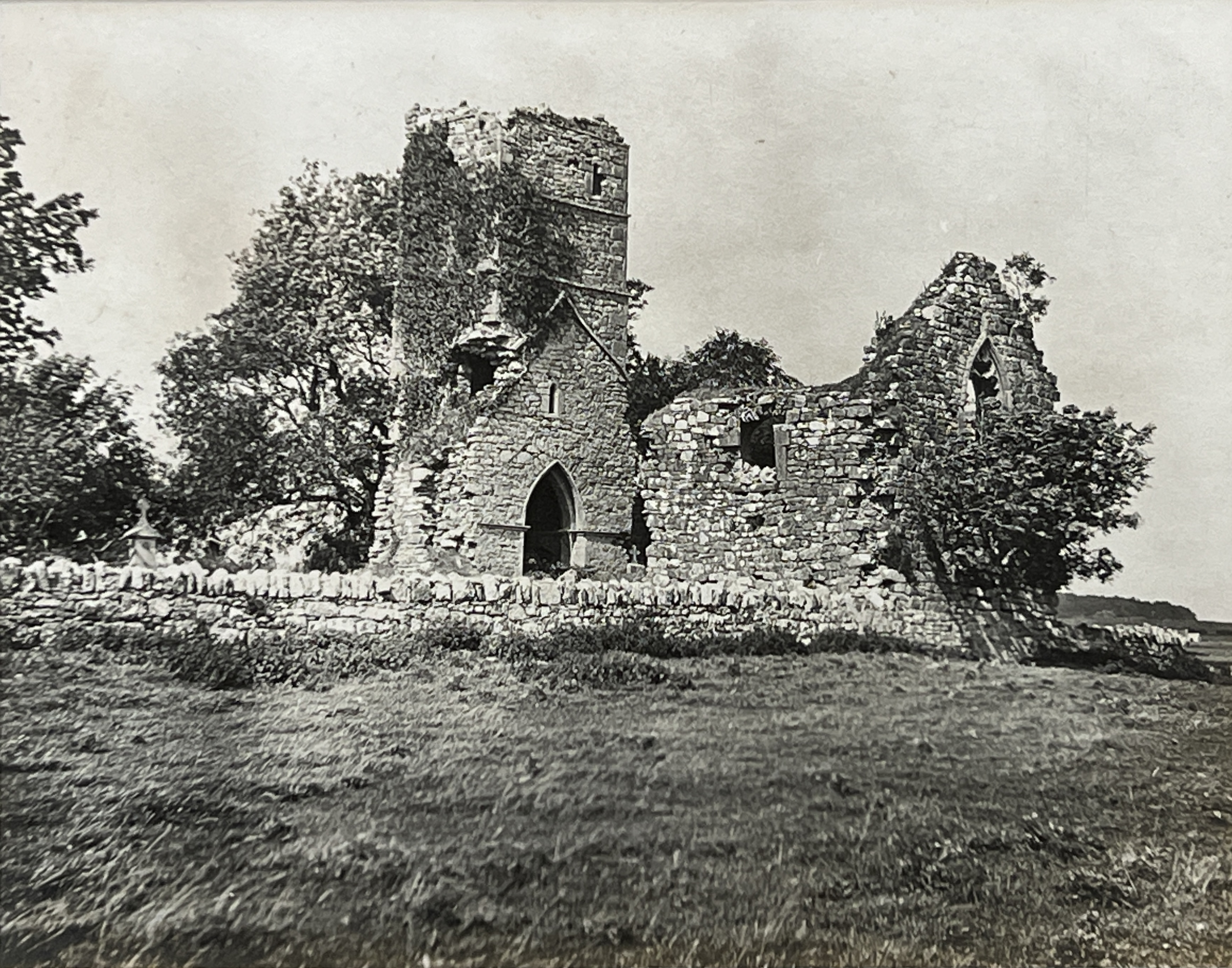
Cloonshanville in 1895 - Original held by Roscommon County Library, Frenchpark Album

Following the 12th-century church reforms, including the Synods of Ráth Breasail (1111) and Kells-Mellifont (1152), monastic foundations such as Cloonshanville were incorporated into the diocesan system centred on Elphin. This reflected the broader transition from earlier kin-based ecclesiastical networks to a territorial parish structure under episcopal governance.

In 1385, a Dominican friary dedicated to the Holy Cross was founded at Cloonshanville.The foundation is attributed to members of the MacDermot Roe or MacDermot Gall lineage, lords of Airteach. The friary functioned as a centre of worship and burial into the early modern period. In the late sixteenth century it was dissolved as a centre of worship, and its lands were leased by the Crown during the Tudor suppression of the monasteries in Ireland.

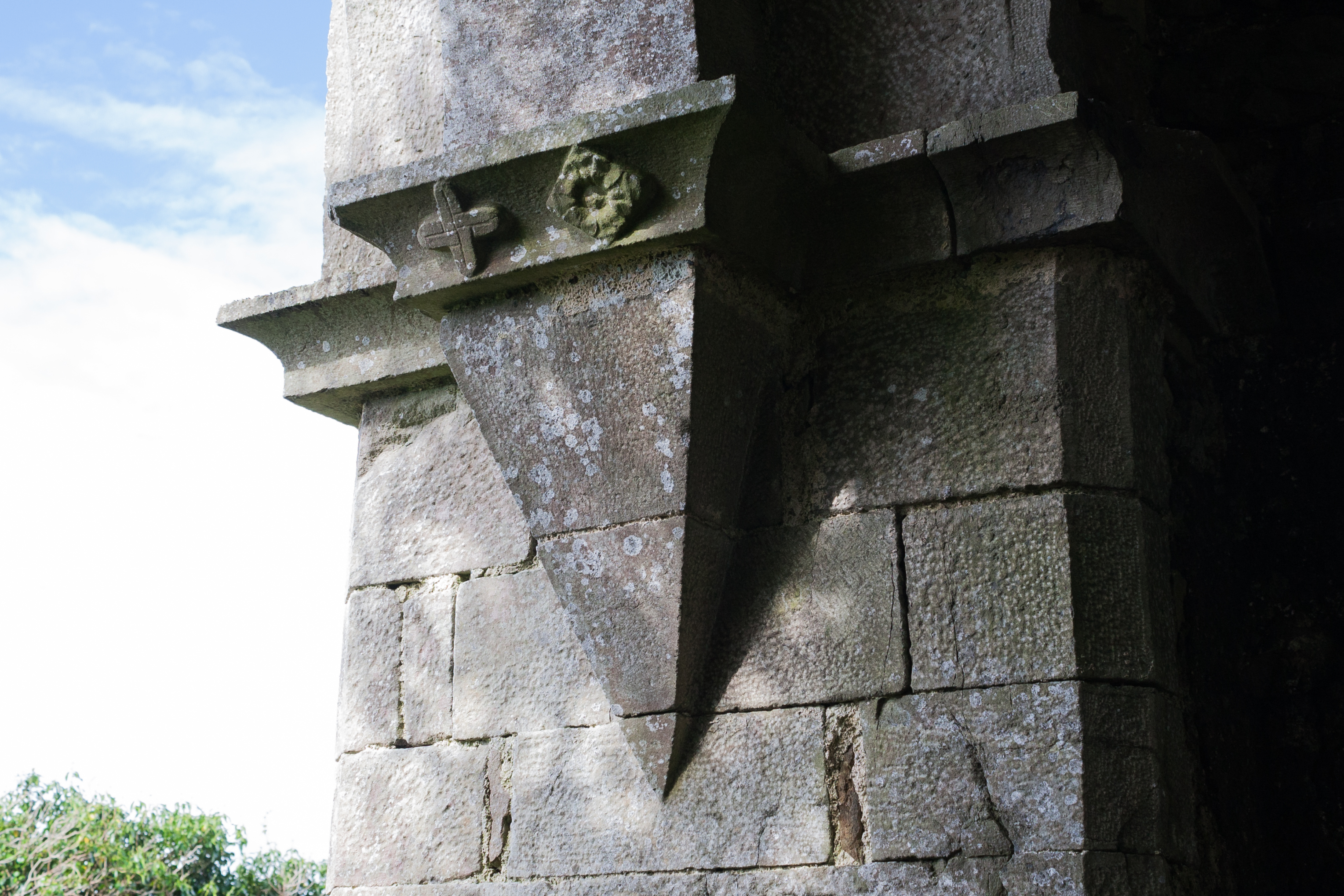
Details on the NW Corbel of the Cloonshanville tower

The surviving remains include a three-storey tower, sections of the chancel and north transept, traces of a cloister, and an enclosing graveyard. The tower maintains some of its original character, including decorative stone work on the interior. In 2025, during conservation efforts, two carved heads where identified at the top of the south wall. An unadorned 12th-century stone cross, approximately 3.9 metres in height, is also located near the abbey grounds.

Folklore associated with Cloonshanville Abbey and the Cloonshanville cross is recorded in the National Folklore Collection. Accounts collected in the 1930s Schools’ Collection refer to traditions of a “holy cow” linked to the site, stories involving witches, curses, and beliefs in the abbey bell hidden in the surrounding boglands among others.

Cloonshanville remains an active graveyard and is currently undergoing conservation and emergency preservation works.

== Early Modern Period ==
=== 17th to 19th centuries ===
The French family, originally from Galway, became the dominant landowners in this part of Roscommon in the late seventeenth century. Dominick French was granted 5000 acres of land in County Roscommon and his son John a further 2000 acres. John French's wealth and influence were such that he was nicknamed An Tiarna Mor (the Great Lord).

==== Barons de Freyne, former owners of Frenchpark ====
In the 1749 Census of Elphin it was the residence of Arthur French, MP in the Parliament of Ireland who was the eldest son of John (An Tiarna Mor) and his wife Anne Gore. His son Arthur French (1764-1820) was also an MP who was said to have died "from excessive fox hunting". His son, also named Arthur French (1786–1856), became the first Baron de Freyne.

Members of the French family were buried in the graveyard surrounding the ruins of Frenchpark Priory. At the time of Griffith's Valuation Frenchpark was owned by Rev. John Ffrench, Lord de Freyne and was valued at £60. Later in the 1800s the family converted to Roman Catholicism.

=== French Park ===
The ancestral seat of the Barons de Freyne was French Park, also known as French Park House, on the outskirts of Frenchpark village in County Roscommon. The manor house, originally built in the mid-17th century before being rebuilt in the Georgian style in the 18th century, was demolished after the sale of the estate by the 7th Baron de Freyne to the Irish Land Commission in 1952. The Land Commission removed the roof of the buildings in 1953 and eventually demolished the remaining structures in c. 1975. The present Lord de Freyne lives with his wife and family at Putney in the London Borough of Wandsworth.

A distant cousin of the de Freynes was Charlotte Despard (née French) (1844–1939), a scion of the French family of High Lake, a British-born, later Irish-based suffragist, novelist and Sinn Féin activist. Despard spent a lot of time at French Park where her father was born. In 1908 she joined with Hanna Sheehy-Skeffington and Margaret Cousins to form the Irish Women's Franchise League. She urged members to boycott the 1911 Census and withhold taxes and provided financial support to workers during the Dublin labour disputes.

In 1909, Despard met Mahatma Gandhi and was influenced for a time by his theory of passive resistance. She moved to Dublin after the First World War and was bitterly critical of her brother, Field Marshal John French, 1st Viscount French, the Lord Lieutenant of Ireland in 1919–21, who tended to ignore her. Lord French had previously served as the United Kingdom's Commander-in-Chief, Home Forces, during the First World War.

During the Irish War of Independence, together with Maud Gonne, Despard formed the Women's Prisoners' Defence League to support Republican prisoners. As a member of Cumann na mBan, she opposed the Anglo-Irish Treaty and was imprisoned by the new Government of the Irish Free State during the Irish Civil War. She is buried in the Republican Plot at Glasnevin Cemetery, Dublin.

=== Market House ===
The market house is in the centre of Frenchpark, on the main street and was constructed circa 1840. The market house was a place where people went to sell their cattle and farm produce (vegetables, potatoes and oats). On market day, which was always on a Thursday, they would trade, buy and sell. There was a large weighing scales outside the building. Unsold goods were stored in the building. The first electricity was generated for Frenchpark from this building. A film was made in the market house about "The Hanging of Robert Emmett". The building is now empty and is surrounded by high railings.

== See also ==
- Category:People from Frenchpark
- Frenchpark (barony)
