= The Oratory School =

Public school in Woodcote, Oxfordshire, England

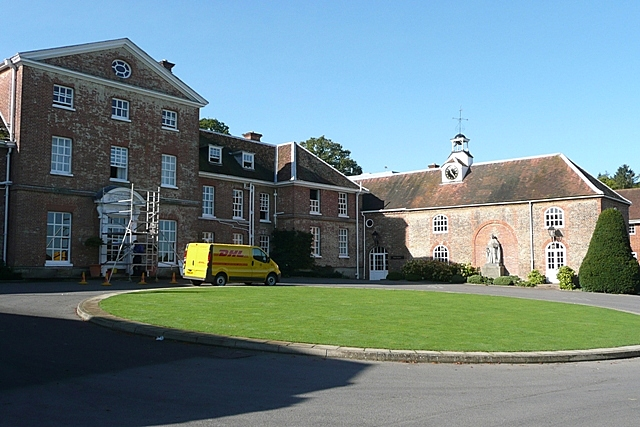

Location
- Woodcote, South Oxfordshire, RG8 0PJ; England; 51.532562°N 1.058421°W

Information
- Type: Public School; Private day and boarding
- Motto: Latin: Cor ad cor loquitur (Heart speaks to heart)
- Religious affiliation: Roman Catholic Oratorian
- Established: 1859
- Founder: Saint John Henry Newman
- Local authority: Oxfordshire
- Department for Education URN: 123282 Tables
- President: Nicholas Purnell
- Chairman of the Governors: Frank Gargent
- Head master: Matthew Fogg
- Gender: Boys and Girls
- Age: 11 to 18
- Enrolment: 373
- Houses: 4
- Colours: Oratory gold & black
- Publication: The Oratorian; The Buzz
- Former pupils: Old Oratorians
- Website: www.oratory.co.uk

The Oratory School (/ˈɒrətɒri/) is an HMC co-educational private Catholic boarding and day school for pupils aged 11–18 located in Woodcote, 6 miles (9.7 km) north-west of Reading, England. Founded in 1859 by John Henry Newman, The Oratory has historical ties to the Birmingham Oratory and the London Oratory School.

Although a separate entity from the nearby Oratory Preparatory School, it shares a common history. Newman founded the school with the intention of providing boys with a Catholic alternative to Eton College. Until 2020, when it first admitted girls, it was the only boys' Catholic public school left in the United Kingdom. According to the Good Schools Guide (last review: Oct 2021), the school is "an active choice for families looking for a small, nurturing environment."

The Oratory has received the highest grade of 'Excellent' for both Independent Schools Inspectorate (ISI Report: Nov 2021) categories: pupils' academic & other achievements and pupils' personal development.

== History ==
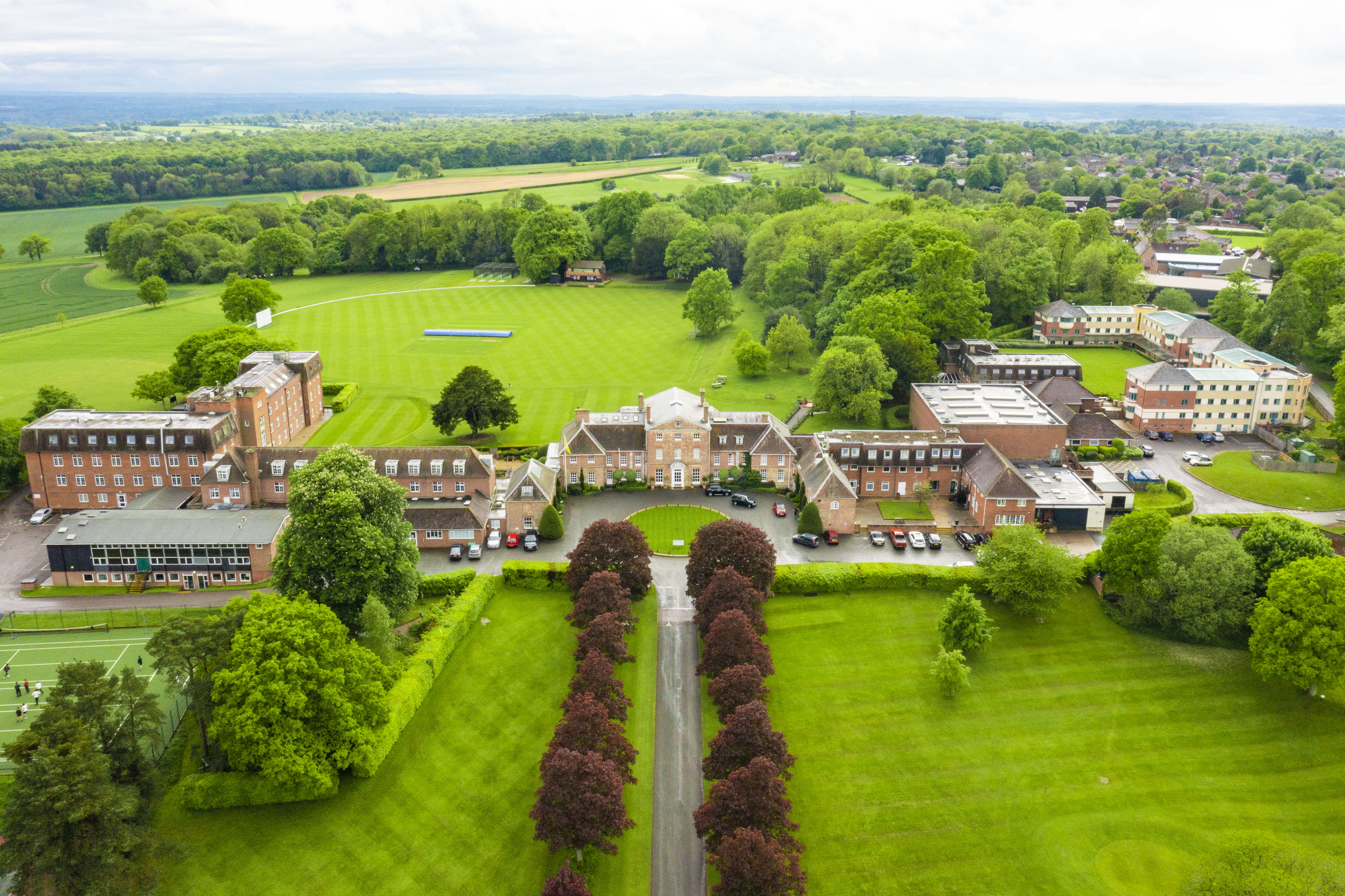
The Oratory School aerial view

The Oratory School was founded in 1859. The first boys arrived before work began on 1 May that year. The objective was to provide a Roman Catholic alternative to other schools, particularly for the sons of converts from Anglicanism who considered existing Catholic schools culturally and socially inferior.

The school was originally in Edgbaston, Birmingham, attached to the Birmingham Oratory Fathers' House and the Oratory Church. In 1923, under pressure for additional space, it moved to Caversham Park, a Victorian stately home near Reading. Following the outbreak of the Second World War, that property was requisitioned by the government, initially with the intention of being used as a hospital, but in the event being purchased in 1941 by the BBC as a base for its Monitoring Service. The school acquired a new site not far away in Woodcote, where it has remained since. According to a Freedom of Information Request the school withdrew from the Teachers Pension Scheme on 31 December 2020.

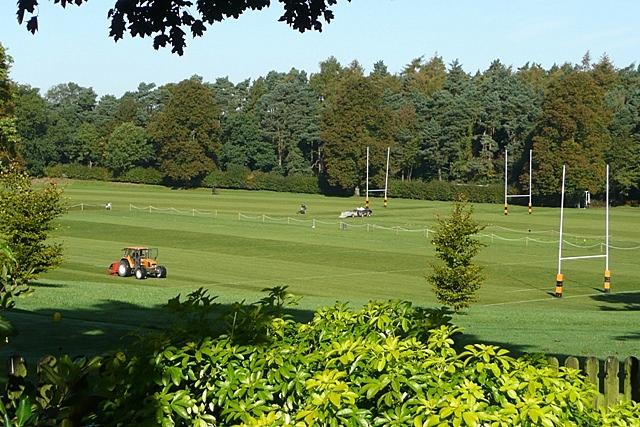
The playing fields

== Real tennis ==
The Oratory is one of five schools in the United Kingdom with a real tennis court (others being Clifton College, Radley, Canford, and Wellington College), and plays the sport, hosting championships and international tournaments. The UK Professional Singles Tournament has been held at the court, and in April 2006 the World Championships were held there. In January 2020 the World Championship Eliminator match took place between Camden Riviere and Old Oratorian, Nicky Howell.. The Oratory School hosted the Ladies Real Tennis World Championship in 2023, in an event won by Claire Fahey.

== Notable head masters ==
- 1862–1865 Tom Arnold
- 1910–1921 Edward Pereira
- 1933–1939 Illtyd Trethowan
- 2000–2014 Clive Dytor

== Controversy ==
=== Sexual abuse ===
In February 2013, it was discovered that Jonathan O'Brien, a former teacher, had been involved in sexually abusing boys aged ten to sixteen while working at The Oratory in the 1980s. O'Brien was sentenced to thirteen years imprisonment.

=== Disciplinary ===
In February 2014, there were allegations that older pupils had been beating younger students and killing animals outside school - including the skinning of a cat. A teacher resigned and alleged that she had done so because her concerns over the pupils' behaviour had been repeatedly ignored. She filed a claim against the school for "forced dismissal" but the claim was thrown out by the Reading employment tribunal as she had voluntarily resigned and was not "forced to quit". The then-headmaster Clive Dytor stated that the incidents she mentioned had already been dealt with.

== Notable Old Oratorians ==
- Gervase Elwes (1866–1921) – tenor
- Hilaire Belloc (1870–1953) – orator, poet, sailor, satirist, writer of letters, soldier, and political activist
- John Pius Boland (1870–1958) – Irish Nationalist politician, Member of Parliament (MP), gold medallist Olympic games for tennis (1896)
- George Henry Morris (1872–1914), Irish Guards officer
- Sir Adrian Carton de Wiart (1880–1963) – soldier and diplomat
- Simon Elwes (1902–1976) – war artist
- Christopher Tolkien (1924–2020) – academic editor
- Igor Judge, Baron Judge (1941-2023) – crossbench peer and jurist who served as Lord Chief Justice of England and Wales
- Michael Tolkien (b. 1943) – teacher and poet
- Michael Berkeley, Baron Berkeley of Knighton (b. 1948) – crossbench peer, composer, broadcaster
- Ayoola Erinle (b. 1980) – rugby union player
- Danny Cipriani (b. 1987) – rugby union player
- Benny Howell (b. 1988) – cricketer
- Jonathan Bailey (b. 1988) – actor
- Afonso, Prince of Beira (b. 1996) – Portuguese royal

== Notable staff ==
- Walter Abel Heurtley, classical archaeologist, taught at the school in the early 20th century, and was its bursar during the Second World War.
- Gerard Manley Hopkins, poet, taught at the school in 1867-68.

== See also ==
- The Oratory Preparatory School
- List of rowing blades by school and university
