= Owen Wynne (1723–1789) =

Member of the Irish Parliament (1749–1789)

Owen Wynne (1723 – 18 March 1789) was an Irish Member of Parliament. He sat in the House of Commons of Ireland from 1749 to 1789.

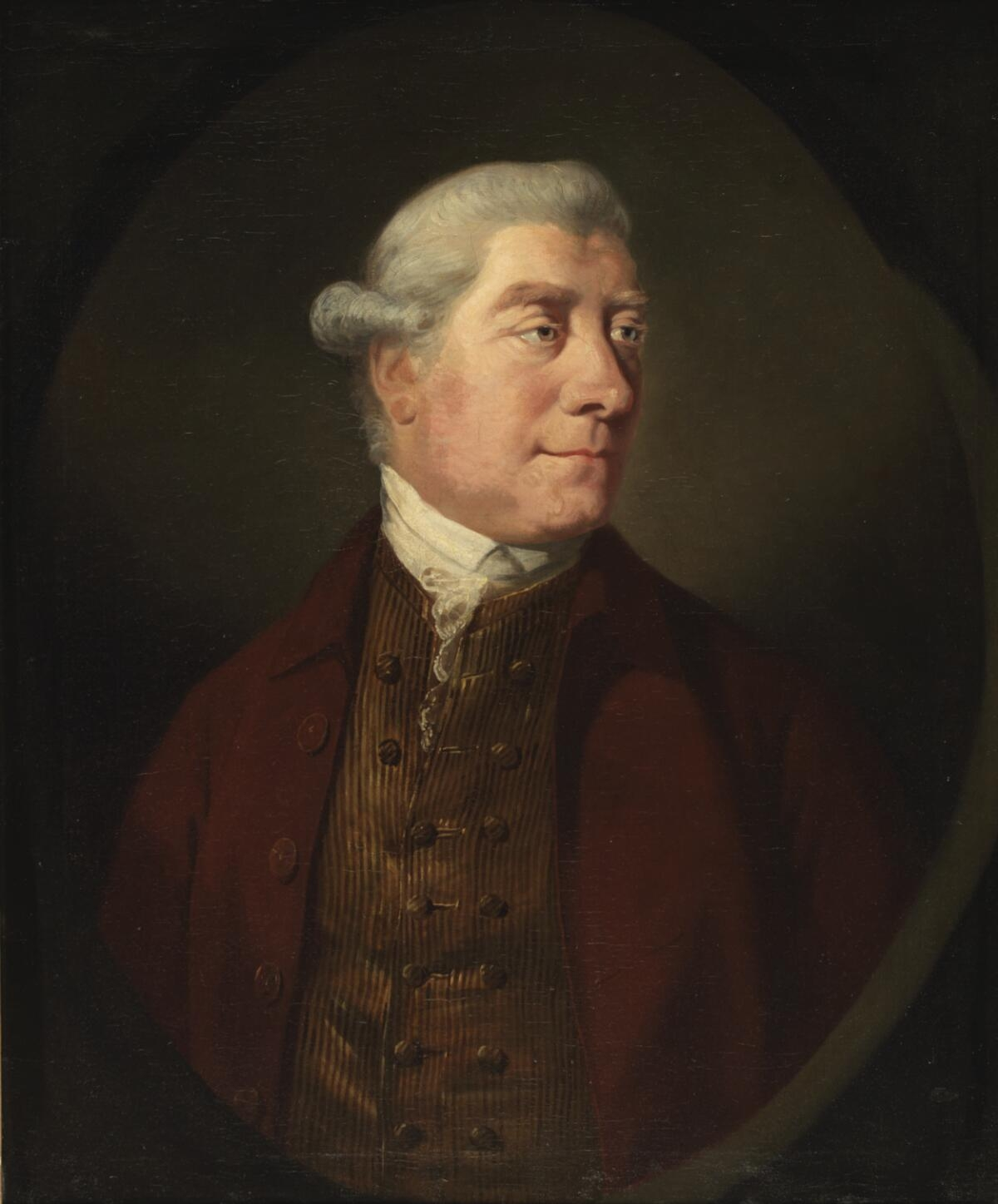
A painting from the Framed Works of Art collection at the National Library of Wales.

He was an MP for County Sligo from 1749 to 1778, and for Sligo from 1776 until 1789.

Wynne was a prominent landowner in Co. Leitrim and Co. Sligo. His main residence was Hazelwood House, Co. Sligo. However, he spent a good deal of time in Dublin due to his parliamentary responsibilities and had a house at 3 Henrietta Street. His great uncle Owen Wynne (1665–1737) was a prominent soldier and politician and had purchased the estates in Co. Sligo to add to the family's existing estates in Co. Leitrim. He then built Hazelwood House.

Wynne married Anne Maxwell, the sister of the first Earl of Farnham, on 13 December 1754. They had six sons and three daughters. The senior Wynne line of Hazelwood House died out in 1910 with the death of Owen Wynne VI (1843–1910) with no male heirs. However, the wider family continued to flourish through the descendants of Wynne's younger sons. These descendants include General Sir Arthur Singleton Wynne, Arthur Beavor Wynne, Archdeacon George Robert Wynne, Emily Wynne, Gladys Wynne, Canon Billy Wynne and Kathleen Lynn.

Parliament of Ireland
Preceded by Joshua Cooper I James Wynne	Member of Parliament for County Sligo; 1749–1778; With: Joshua Cooper to 1757; Benjamin Burton 1757–61; Sir Edward King, 5th Bt 1761–65; Paul Annesley Gore 1765–68; Joshua Cooper II from 1768	Succeeded by Joshua Cooper II; Owen Wynne II
Preceded by William Ormsby; John Wynne	Member of Parliament for Sligo; 1776–1789; With: Richard Hely-Hutchinson 1776–83; John Foster 1783; Thomas Dawson from 1783	Succeeded by Thomas Dawson; Robert Wynne
