= Arthur Wynne (British Army officer) =

British army general (1846–1936)

General Sir Arthur Wynne GCB DL
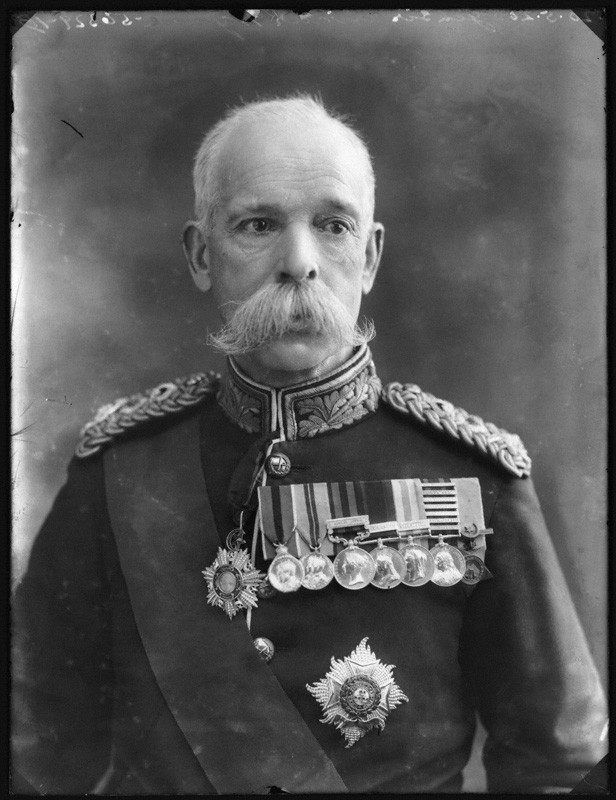
- Born: 5 March 1846
- Died: 6 February 1936 (aged 89)
- Military career
- Allegiance: (United Kingdom) British Empire
- Branch: British Army
- Service years: 1863–1911
- Rank: General
- Commands: 6th Division; Eastern District; 10th Division; Cape Colony District; 11th Infantry Brigade
- Conflicts: Second Anglo-Afghan War; Mahdist War; Second Boer War
- Awards: Knight Grand Cross of the Order of the Bath; Mentioned in Despatches; Order of the Medjidie, 3rd Class

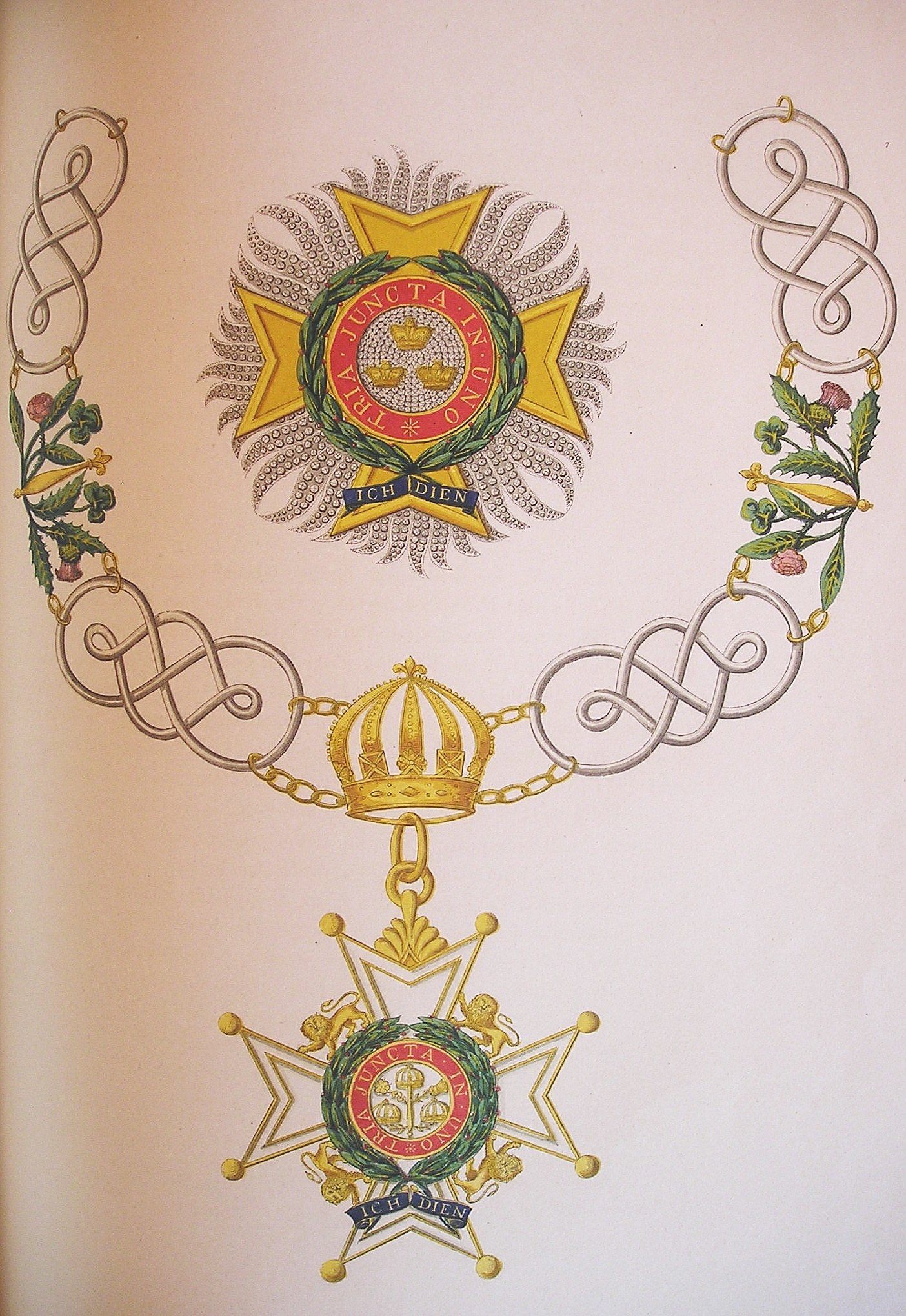
GCB insignia

General Sir Arthur Singleton Wynne, GCB, DL (5 March 1846 – 6 February 1936), was a senior British Army officer from the Anglo-Irish gentry who served as Military Secretary.

== Military career ==
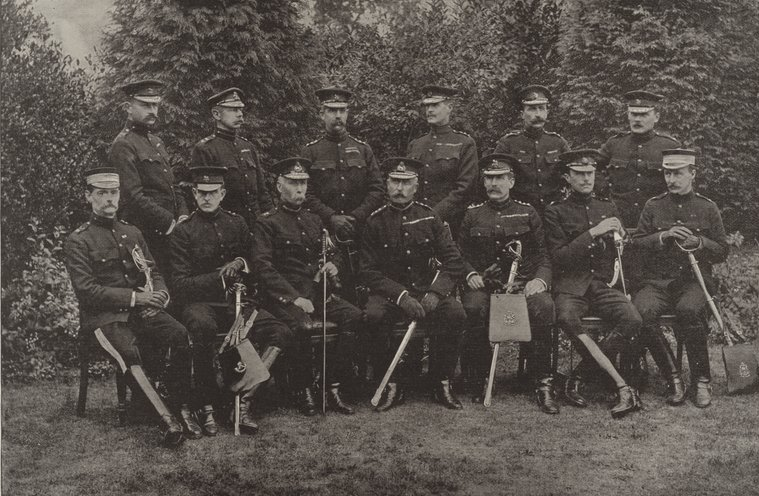
The retirement of the Duke of Connaught from the Aldershot Command, 1898. Stood in the back row, third from the left, is Colonel Wynne.

Commissioned into the 51st Regiment of Foot in 1863, Wynne became Adjutant of his regiment in 1868. In 1877, Wynne became Superintendent of Army Signalling during the Jowaki campaign. He served in the Second Anglo-Afghan War from 1878 and was Commander of Field Telegraphs with the Karum Valley Field Force. In 1885 he was awarded the Order of the Medjidie, 3rd Class, by the Khedive of Egypt for "service in Sudan", and by 1889 he was Deputy Assistant-Adjutant-General at Army Headquarters. By 1891 Wynne was Assistant-Adjutant-General at the Curragh. He then joined the General Staff at Malta before transferring to Aldershot.

Wynne served in the Second Boer War and was appointed Deputy Adjutant-General for the Natal Field Force in South Africa, and after the Battle of Spion Kop he was given command of the 11th Infantry Brigade in place of General Sir Edward Woodgate, who died from wounds sustained in action; During the Battle of the Tugela Heights in February 1900 Wynne was slightly injured, and his command was given to Colonel Walter Kitchener. He returned to duty the following month. After recovering, he was appointed in command of the Cape Colony District until his return to Great Britain in early 1902. He was mentioned in despatches (including by Lord Kitchener, dated 23 June 1902).

Following his return to Great Britain, Wynne was appointed Deputy Adjutant-General to the Forces on 14 May 1902, General Officer Commanding 10th Division within IV Army Corps and General Officer Commanding Eastern District in 1904 and General Officer Commanding 6th Division in 1905. He was promoted to lieutenant general in December 1905, and went on to be military secretary to the secretary of state for war and secretary of the selection board in October 1906, taking over from Colonel Spencer Ewart. He was made a Companion of the Order of the Bath (CB) in June 1907.

In retirement Wynne was promoted General and appointed Keeper of the Jewel House, holding the office from 1911 to 1917. From April 1913 to 1927 he also held the colonelcy of the King's Own Yorkshire Light Infantry. He lived at Haybergill near Warcop in Cumberland and served as Deputy Lieutenant of Westmoreland.

== Family ==
A descendant of the Welsh Wynne family from Merioneth via Lieutenant-General Owen Wynne (1665–1737), he was a great-grandson of the Rt Hon. Owen Wynne, MP (1723–1789), of Hazelwood House, County Sligo. His father was John Wynne (1799–1884), of Wynnstay House, Roebuck, County Dublin, and his mother was Anne Warren, daughter of Admiral Sir Samuel Warren.

He married Emily Mary Turner (1862–1959), daughter of Charles Turner, of Warcop House, Westmorland, on 8 September 1886. General Sir Arthur and Lady Wynne had three sons, all of whom saw service in the British Army:

- Owen Wynne (1887–1974), OBE, Colonel RE;
- Graeme Wynne (1889–1964), OBE, Major KOYLI;
- Arthur Wynne (1893–1964), AFC, Captain RAF.

== See also ==
- Burke's Landed Gentry of Ireland
- Tower of London

Military offices
Preceded by Sir Herbert Plumer	GOC Eastern District and 10th Division (renamed 6th Division in 1905); 1904–1906	Succeeded by Theodore Stephenson
Preceded by Sir John Spencer Ewart	Military Secretary; 1906–1911	Succeeded by Sir William Franklyn
Honorary titles
Preceded by Frederick Deshon	Colonel of the King's Own Yorkshire Light Infantry; 1913–1927	Succeeded by Sir Charles Deedes
