= Joshua Cooper (died 1757) =

Joshua Cooper (c. 1696 – 4 August 1757) was an Irish landowner and politician from Markree Castle, near Collooney in County Sligo.

He was High Sheriff of Sligo in 1718, and sat in the House of Commons of Ireland as Member of Parliament (MP) for County Sligo from 1719 until his death.

Cooper was the oldest son of Arthur Cooper (1667–1693) of Markree and his wife Mary Allen, daughter of Sir Joshua Allen and brother of the 1st Viscount Allen. Arthur's father was Edward Cooper (c. 1616–1676), a cornet in the Cromwellian army who was awarded lands in County Sligo in 1663 after the defeat of the O'Brien Clan. Edward bequeathed Markree to Arthur, and his lands in Limerick and Kerry to Arthur's younger brother Richard.

Joshua Cooper married Mary Bingham, the daughter of Richard Bingham of Newbrook, County Mayo. They had two sons, Joshua (1732–1800) and Richard. On his death, the Markree estate passed to Joshua, who was also an MP and became a Privy Councillor.

Parliament of Ireland
Preceded by William Ormsby; Chidley Coote	Member of Parliament for County Sligo; 1719–1757; With: William Ormsby to 1727; Owen Wynne I 1727–37; James Wynne 1737–49; Owen Wynne II from 1749	Succeeded by Owen Wynne II; Benjamin Burton
