= Alfred Charles Glyn Egerton =

British chemist

Sir Alfred Charles Glyn Egerton FRS
- 1932 portrait by Walter Stoneman
- Born: 11 October 1886; Glyn Cywarch, near Talsarnau, Gwynedd, Wales
- Died: 7 September 1959 (aged 72); Mouans-Sartoux, France
- Education: University College London
- Known for: Liquid methane
- Awards: Rumford Medal (1946)
- Scientific career
- Fields: Chemistry
- Workplaces: Royal Military Academy, Woolwich; Clarendon Laboratory; Imperial College of Science

Sir Alfred Charles Glyn Egerton, FRS (11 October 1886 – 7 September 1959) was a British chemist. After enlisting in the Coldstream Guards, he was seconded to the Department of Explosives Supply and did research into munitions. After the war he studied the vapour pressure of metals before his interest turned to combustion. He pioneered the use of liquid methane as a fuel.

== Early life ==
Egerton was born in Glyn Cywarch, near Talsarnau, Gwynedd, Wales, on 11 October 1886, the fourth son of Colonel Sir Alfred Mordaunt Egerton, an officer of the Rifle Brigade and the Royal Horse Guards, and Comptroller to the Duke of Connaught and Strathearn, and his wife, The Honourable Mary Georgina Ormsby-Gore, the oldest daughter of William Ormsby-Gore, 2nd Baron Harlech. He grew up at Glyn Cywarch and Brogyntyn, houses that belonged to his maternal grandfather. He was educated at Eton College, which he entered in 1900. Contemporaries included Robert Strutt, Thomas Ralph Merton and Julian Huxley.

After graduating from Eton in 1904, he entered University College London, where he read chemistry under the tutelage of Sir William Ramsay. He graduated in 1908 with first-class honours, and went to Nancy University to perform post-graduate work. He intended to then proceed to Germany, but this was cut short in 1909 by an offer of a position as an instructor at the Royal Military Academy, Woolwich. His research there was largely devoted to nitrogen oxides, on which he published three papers in 1913 and 1914. He was commissioned as a second lieutenant on 1 July 1909 in University of London contingent of the Officers' Training Corps.

== Career ==
In 1913 he went to Berlin to work in the laboratory of Walther Nernst. Frederick Lindemann was also there at this time, and the two became friends. During the July Crisis in 1914, Nernst helped Egerton and his wife leave Germany. They arrived back in England on 3 August 1914, the day before Britain declared war on Germany, joining the Great War.

Egerton joined the Coldstream Guards, but was soon seconded to the Department of Explosives Supply in the Ministry of Munitions, where he helped with the design and construction of the chain of National Explosives Factories in response to the Shell Crisis of 1915. Two of his brothers were killed in the war. During the final stages of the war, he was engaged in studying the problem of synthetic ammonia production. In January 1919, soon after the war ended, he joined an Inter-Allied mission under Harold Hartley, the Controller of the Chemical Warfare Department in the Ministry of Munitions, to study the German chemical industry. He found that the Germans had been able to produce vast quantities of synthetic ammonia using the Haber process.

Later that year he joined the Clarendon Laboratory at Oxford University, where he succeeded Henry Tizard as Reader in Thermodynamics in 1923. He resumed work that he had commenced in Berlin on the vapour pressure of metals. He wrote seven papers on the topic in 1923, but by 1935 he discontinued research in the area, having measured the vapour pressure, heat of vapourisation and specific heat ratios of cadmium, lead, magnesium, potassium, sodium, thallium and zinc. From 1924 on, he had become increasingly interested in combustion. He was particularly interested in the phenomenon of engine knocking, and how it might be prevented. He studied the propagation of flames, the mechanism of hydrocarbon oxidation, and the role of peroxides in their combustion. For his research, he created a special kind of burner that could create a stationary plane flame front for the purpose of examining the flame's properties.

Egerton was elected a fellow of the Royal Society in 1925, and served on its council from 1931 to 1933, and as its Physical Secretary from 1938 to 1948. He also served on several quangos, including the Scientific and Advisory Committee of Department of Scientific and Industrial Research, the Fuel Research Board, the Heating and Ventilating Research Committee, the Engine Committee of the Aeronautical Research Council, the Water Pollution Board and the Advisory Committee of the London, Midland and Scottish Railway.

In 1936, he assumed the chair of Chemical Technology at the Imperial College of Science. During the Second World War he pioneered the use of liquid methane as an alternative to petrol as a fuel for motor vehicles. Trials were carried out with a bus on a route in the Midlands. He was a member of the War Cabinet's Scientific Advisory Committee, and was Chairman of the Admiralty's Fuel and Propulsion Committee. In 1943, he was sent to Washington, DC, to reorganise the British Central Scientific Office there, and to improve scientific liaison with the Americans. In this, he was successful, establishing good relations with American scientific administrators such as Vannevar Bush and James Conant. He was knighted for his services on 1 January 1943, an honour which King George VI conferred on him in a ceremony at Buckingham Palace on 9 February 1943. After the war he was awarded the Rumford medal in 1946. He was the Chairman of the Scientific Advisory Council of the Ministry of Fuel and Power from 1948 to 1953, and was director of the Salters' Institute of Industrial Chemistry from 1949 to 1959. Between 1948 and his retirement from the Imperial College of Science in 1952, he published seventeen papers.

== Family ==
In 1912 Egerton married The Honourable Ruth Julia Cripps, the daughter of Charles Cripps, 1st Baron Parmoor, and the sister of his friend Stafford Cripps. They had no children, but did adopt a nephew.

== Death ==
Egerton died on 7 September 1959 at Mas del Soleou, a country estate in Mouans-Sartoux, France, that he had inherited from his mother. His papers are held by the Royal Society and the Imperial College Archives and Corporate Records Unit. His correspondence with Lord Cherwell is in the Nuffield College, Oxford library, and correspondence with Archibald Hill is kept in the Churchill Archives Centre.
