= Joshua Cooper (1732–1800) =

Irish politician

Joshua Cooper (1732 – 16 December 1800) was an Irish landowner and politician from County Sligo.

Cooper was educated at Trinity College Dublin.

He sat in the House of Commons of Ireland from 1761 to 1783, as a Member of Parliament (MP) for Castlebar from 1761 to 1768, and for County Sligo 1768 to 1783. He was made a Privy Councillor in 1776 by King George III.

Cooper was the older of two sons of Joshua Cooper MP and his wife Mary, the daughter of Richard Bingham of Newbrook, County Mayo. He inherited his father's estate of Markree Castle near Collooney. He married Alicia Synge, daughter of Edward Synge, the Bishop of Elphin. On his death, Markree passed to his oldest son Joshua Edward Cooper (c. 1761–1837), who was an MP for County Sligo from 1790 to 1806. Joshua Edward became deranged by 1806, and management of Markree passed to Joshua's younger son Edward Synge Cooper (1762–1830), whose son Edward Joshua Cooper inherited Markree in 1837.

His great-grandson Edward Joshua Cooper, also an MP, was a noted astronomer who built Markree Observatory in the 1830s.

Parliament of Ireland
| Preceded by John Browne; Henry Mitchell | Member of Parliament for Castlebar; 1761 – 1768; With: Sir Charles Bingham, 7th Bt 1761; Richard Gore from 1761 | Succeeded by Edward Kirwan; John Knox |
| Preceded by Owen Wynne I Paul Annesley Gore | Member of Parliament for County Sligo; 1768 – 1783; With: Owen Wynne I to 1778; Owen Wynne II from 1778 | Succeeded by Owen Wynne II; Charles O'Hara |
