= Billy Wynne =

Billy Wynne may refer to:

- Billy Wynne (baseball) (born 1943), American former MLB pitcher
- Billy Wynne (minister) (1919–2000), Irish minister

== See also ==
- Bill Wynne (1922–2021), American author, photographer, award-winning photojournalist, and community advocate
- Bill Wynne (baseball) (1869–1951), American MLB pitcher
