= NGC 46 =

Star in the Pisces constellation

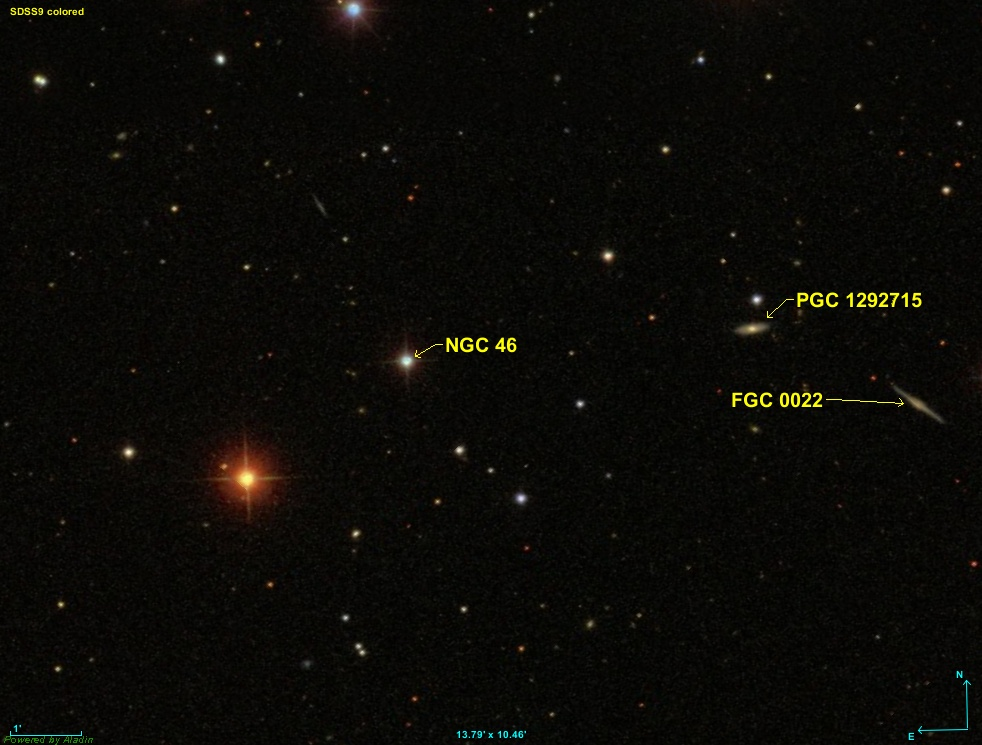
- NGC 46 as seen on SDSS

Observation data Epoch J2000 Equinox ICRS
- Constellation: Pisces
- Right ascension: 00^{h} 14^{m} 09.88^{s}
- Declination: +05° 59′ 15.8″
- Apparent magnitude (V): 11.68

Astrometry
Radial velocity (R_{v})	−1.55±0.81 km/s
Proper motion (μ)	RA: 19.837 mas/yr Dec.: 2.189 mas/yr
Parallax (π)	2.2990±0.0224 mas
Distance	1,420 ± 10 ly (435 ± 4 pc)

Details
Mass	1.11 M_{☉}
Radius	1.47 R_{☉}
Luminosity	2.56 L_{☉}
Surface gravity (log g)	4.15 cgs
Temperature	6,017 K

Other designations
- TYC 8-572-1, GSC 00008-00572, NGC 46

Database references
SIMBAD	data

NGC 46, occasionally referred to as PGC 5067596, is a star located approximately 1,420 light-years from the Solar System in the constellation Pisces. It was first discovered on October 22, 1852, by Irish astronomer Edward Joshua Cooper, who incorrectly identified it as a nebula.

== See also ==
- List of NGC objects (1–1000)
- Pisces (constellation)
