= Joshua Edward Cooper =

Irish politician (died 1837)

Colonel Joshua Edward Cooper (c. 1761 – 8 June 1837) was an Irish landowner and politician from County Sligo.

Cooper was the oldest son of Joshua Cooper MP (1732–1800) of Markree Castle, and his wife Alicia, daughter of Edward Synge, Bishop of Elphin. He was the older brother of Edward Synge Cooper. He was educated by Rev. Richard Norris in Drogheda, and then at Trinity College Dublin. In 1801 he married Elizabeth Lindesay, daughter of Robert Lindesay MP, from Loughry, County Tyrone. On his father's death in 1801, he inherited Markree.

He sat in the House of Commons of Ireland from 1790 to 1800, as one of the two Members of Parliament for County Sligo. After the Act of Union in 1800, he sat in the House of Commons of the United Kingdom until 1806 as MP for County Sligo. He appears to have participated little in the proceedings of the Westminster Parliament, and stood down at the general election 1806, by which time he was deranged. His younger brother Edward Synge Cooper took over the running of the family estates, and was returned in his place as MP for County Sligo.

Cooper was Governor of County Sligo in 1802. He was also an officer in the Sligo militia, as a major in 1793, lieutenant-colonel in 1795, and colonel from 1804 to 1807.

Cooper died in 1837. He and Elizabeth had no children, and Markree was inherited by his nephew Edward Joshua Cooper, son of Edward Synge Cooper.

Parliament of Ireland
Preceded by Charles O'Hara; Owen Wynne	Member of Parliament for County Sligo; 1790–1800; With: Charles O'Hara	Succeeded by Parliament of the United Kingdom
Parliament of the United Kingdom
Preceded by Parliament of Ireland	Member of Parliament for County Sligo; 1801–1806; With: Charles O'Hara	Succeeded by Charles O'Hara; Edward Synge Cooper
