= Alexander Perceval =

Irish politician (1787–1858)

Colonel Alexander Perceval
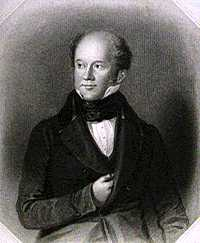

Serjeant-at-Arms of the House of Lords
- In office 1841 – 9 December 1858
- Monarch: Victoria

Member of Parliament for County Sligo
- In office 17 May 1831 – 30 September 1841 Serving with Edward Joshua Cooper (to July 1841); William Ormsby-Gore (from July 1841)

Junior Lord of the Treasury
- In office 1841
- Prime Minister: Sir Robert Peel

Treasurer of the Ordnance
- In office 12 January 1835 – 9 May 1835
- Monarch: William IV
- Preceded by: Thomas Creevey
- Succeeded by: Sir Henry Parnell, Bt

Personal details
- Born: 1787 Derbyshire, England
- Died: 9 December 1858 (aged 70–71) London, England
- Resting place: West Norwood Cemetery
- Party: Conservative
- Spouse: Jane Anne L'Estrange
- Parent: Rev. Philip Perceval
- Military career
- Allegiance: United Kingdom
- Rank: Colonel

Colonel Alexander Perceval (1787 – 9 December 1858) was an Irish politician.

== Early life ==
Perceval was born in 1787

He was the eldest surviving son of Rev. Philip Perceval of Temple House, Ballymote, Sligo. He succeeded his father in 1800.

== Political career ==
He sat in the House of Commons for County Sligo from 1831 to 1841, when his growing financial difficulties compelled him to resign his seat. He served briefly as a Junior Lord of the Treasury in Sir Robert Peel's second government (1841).

He was Sergeant-at-Arms of the House of Lords from 1841 until his death.

== Death ==
He died at Chester Street, London, on 9 December 1858 and was buried at West Norwood Cemetery. He had married Jane Anne, the daughter of Col. Henry Peisley L’Estrange of Moystown, Cloghan, King's County and had a large family. Due to his extravagance Temple House had to be sold but was bought back for the family by his third son, also Alexander (1821–1866).

Military offices
Preceded by Thomas Creevey	Treasurer of the Ordnance; 1835	Succeeded by Sir Henry Parnell, Bt
Parliament of the United Kingdom
Preceded by Edward Joshua Cooper; Henry King	Member of Parliament for County Sligo; 1831–1841; With: Edward Joshua Cooper to July 1841; William Ormsby-Gore from July 1841	Succeeded by William Ormsby-Gore; John Ffolliott
