= Henry King (British Army officer) =

British Army general

Lieutenant-General The Honourable Sir Henry King KCB
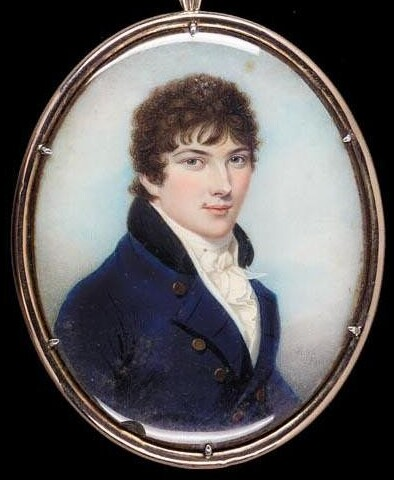

Member of the British Parliament for County Sligo
- In office 1822–1831

Personal details
- Born: 4 July 1776
- Died: 25 November 1839 (aged 63) Winkfield
- Spouses: Mary Hewitt (m. 1802; died 1821); Catherine Philipps (m. 1832)
- Children: 7
- Parents: Robert King, 2nd Earl of Kingston (father); Caroline Fitzgerald (mother)

Military service
- Allegiance: United Kingdom
- Branch/service: British Army
- Years of service: 1794–1839
- Rank: Lieutenant-General
- Battles/wars: French Revolutionary Wars; Anglo-Russian Invasion of Holland (WIA); Haitian Revolution; Napoleonic Wars; Hanover Expedition (POW); British invasions of the River Plate; Peninsular War; Battle of Bussaco; Battle of Fuentes d'Onoro; Siege of Badajoz; Battle of Salamanca

Lieutenant-General Sir Henry King KCB (4 July 1776 – 25 November 1839) was a British Army officer and Member of Parliament for County Sligo in Ireland. He was the fourth son of Robert King, 2nd Earl of Kingston (1754–1799).

== Military career ==
Henry King joined the army as an ensign in the 47th Foot in 1794. He was subsequently a lieutenant (1795), a captain in the 56th Foot (1796), the Life Guards (1799) and the 43rd Foot (1802), a major in the 5th Foot (1804), a lieut.-colonel in 1809, a colonel in 1814 and a major-general in 1825. He was then colonel of the 1st West India Regiment (1834) and a lieut.-general in 1838. He was severely wounded in both legs in 1799 and captured in 1805. Following the disbandment of his battalion in 1816 he was appointed to the office of Groom of the Bedchamber to the Prince Regent, afterwards George IV of the United Kingdom, serving from 1817 to 1830. He was knighted KCB on 28 March 1835.

He lived at Grove Lodge at Winkfield Row, near Windsor in Berkshire.

== Personal life ==
He died in 1839 and was buried in the parish church at Winkfield. He had married twice: firstly Mary, the daughter of the Hon. and Very Rev. John Hewitt, dean of Cloyne, with whom he had three sons and four daughters and secondly Catherine, the daughter of Rev. Edward Philipps, and widow of J. Richardson.

Parliament of the United Kingdom
Preceded by Charles O'Hara; Edward Synge Cooper	Member of Parliament for County Sligo; 1822–1831; With: Edward Synge Cooper 1822–1830; Edward Joshua Cooper 1830–1831	Succeeded by Edward Joshua Cooper; Alexander Perceval
Military offices
Preceded by Sir Peregrine Maitland	Colonel of the 1st West India Regiment; 1834–1839	Succeeded by Sir William Nicolay
