= John Ffolliott (Conservative MP) =

Irish landowner and Member of Parliament

John Ffolliott (28 December 1798 – 11 February 1868) was an Irish landowner and Member of Parliament.

== Biography ==
He was the eldest son of John Ffolliott of Hollybrook House, County Sligo, by his wife Frances, sister of Sir William Jackson Homan, 1st Baronet. He was descended from a common ancestor with the Ffolliots of Worcestershire. In January 1814, while still a minor, he inherited the Worcestershire property of his great-uncle John (son of John Folliott), but he barred the entail in 1822 and sold the manors of Lickhill and Lower Mitton to Joseph Craven of Steeton.

Ffolliott sat in Parliament for County Sligo from September 1841. He was a Conservative, and in 1846 he voted in favour of agricultural protection. He sat until shortly before 1 March 1850, when he accepted the Chiltern Hundreds.

On 17 December 1822 Ffolliott married Maria Lucy, daughter of Herbert Rawson Stepney of Durrow, King's County, by his wife Alicia Vincentia, daughter of Henry Peisley L'Estrange of Moystown, King's County. They had a son John, who succeeded to Hollybrook House, and a daughter Zaida Maria, who married on 15 June 1847 Sir Thomas Erskine, 2nd Baronet, of Cambo.

Parliament of the United Kingdom
Preceded by Alexander Perceval; William Ormsby-Gore	Member of Parliament for County Sligo; 1841–1850; With: William Ormsby-Gore	Succeeded by William Ormsby-Gore; Sir Robert Gore-Booth
