= County Sligo (UK Parliament constituency) =

UK parliamentary constituency in Ireland, 1801–1885

- Former county constituency for the House of Commons
- County: County Sligo

1801–1885
- Seats: 2
- Created from: County Sligo (IHC)
- Replaced by: North Sligo; South Sligo

County Sligo is a former county constituency in Ireland, represented in the House of Commons of the Parliament of the United Kingdom. It returned two Members of Parliament (MPs), elected by the bloc vote system of election.

== History and boundaries ==
In 1801, the constituency succeeded the constituency of County Sligo in the Irish House of Commons, comprising the whole of County Sligo, except the parliamentary borough of Sligo. After the Sligo and Cashel Disfranchisement Act 1870, the borough ceased to have separate representation, and eligible voters were added to the roll for the county constituency.

From 1885 the constituency was divided into North Sligo and South Sligo.

== Members of Parliament ==
Election	1st Member	1st Party	2nd Member	2nd Party
1801	Joshua Edward Cooper	Tory	Charles O'Hara	Tory
Nov 1806	Edward Synge Cooper	Tory	Charles O'Hara	Tory
Dec 1822	Edward Synge Cooper	Tory	Henry King	Whig
Aug 1830	Edward Joshua Cooper	Tory	Henry King	Whig
May 1831	Edward Joshua Cooper	Tory	Alexander Perceval	Tory
Dec 1834	Edward Joshua Cooper	Conservative	Alexander Perceval	Conservative
Jul 1841	William Ormsby-Gore	Conservative	Alexander Perceval	Conservative
Sep 1841	William Ormsby-Gore	Conservative	John Ffolliott	Conservative
Mar 1850	William Ormsby-Gore	Conservative	Sir Robert Gore-Booth	Conservative
Jul 1852	Richard Swift	Ind. Irish	Sir Robert Gore-Booth	Conservative
Apr 1857	Edward Joshua Cooper	Conservative	Sir Robert Gore-Booth	Conservative
May 1859	Charles William Cooper changed name to O'Hara, 1860	Conservative	Sir Robert Gore-Booth	Conservative
Jul 1865	Edward Henry Cooper	Conservative	Sir Robert Gore-Booth	Conservative
Dec 1868	Denis Maurice O'Conor	Liberal	Sir Robert Gore-Booth	Conservative
Dec 1874	Denis Maurice O'Conor	Home Rule League	Sir Robert Gore-Booth	Conservative
Jan 1877	Denis Maurice O'Conor	Home Rule League	Edward King-Harman	Home Rule
Apr 1880	Denis Maurice O'Conor	Home Rule League	Thomas Sexton	Parnellite Home Rule League
Oct 1882	Denis Maurice O'Conor	Irish Parliamentary	Thomas Sexton	Irish Parliamentary
Aug 1883	Nicholas Lynch	Irish Parliamentary	Thomas Sexton	Irish Parliamentary
1885	constituency abolished: see North Sligo and South Sligo			

== Elections ==
=== Elections in the 1830s ===
General election 1830: County Sligo (2 seats)
Party	Candidate	Votes	%
Tory	Edward Joshua Cooper	465	47.9
Whig	Henry King	390	40.2
Whig	Fitzstephen French	116	11.9
Turnout		514	84.3
Registered electors		610	
Majority		75	7.7
Tory hold			
Majority		274	28.3
Whig hold			

General election 1831: County Sligo (2 seats)
Party	Candidate	Votes	%	±%
Tory	Edward Joshua Cooper	361	43.0	+19.1
Tory	Alexander Perceval	287	34.2	+10.3
Whig	Henry King	191	22.8	−29.3
Majority		96	11.4	+3.7
Turnout		c. 420	c. 69.9	c. −14.4
Registered electors		600		
Tory hold		Swing	+16.9	
Tory gain from Whig		Swing	+12.5	

General election 1832: County Sligo (2 seats)
Party	Candidate	Votes	%
Tory	Edward Joshua Cooper	Unopposed	
Tory	Alexander Perceval	Unopposed	
Registered electors		695	
Tory hold			
Tory hold			

General election 1835: County Sligo (2 seats)
Party	Candidate	Votes	%
Conservative	Edward Joshua Cooper	Unopposed	
Conservative	Alexander Perceval	Unopposed	
Registered electors		694	
Conservative hold			
Conservative hold			

General election 1837: County Sligo (2 seats)
Party	Candidate	Votes	%
Conservative	Edward Joshua Cooper	511	38.5
Conservative	Alexander Perceval	443	33.4
Whig	Daniel Jones	368	27.7
Whig	Charles Joseph McDermott	5	0.4
Majority		75	5.7
Turnout		c. 664	c. 64.1
Registered electors		1,036	
Conservative hold			
Conservative hold			

=== Elections in the 1840s ===
General election 1841: County Sligo (2 seats)
Party	Candidate	Votes	%	±%
Conservative	William Ormsby-Gore	Unopposed		
Conservative	Alexander Perceval	Unopposed		
Registered electors		1,093		
Conservative hold				
Conservative hold				

Perceval was appointed a commissioner of the Treasury, causing a by-election.

By-election, 28 September 1841: County Sligo
Party	Candidate	Votes	%	±%
Conservative	John Ffolliott	Unopposed		
Conservative hold				

General election 1847: County Sligo (2 seats)
Party	Candidate	Votes	%	±%
Conservative	William Ormsby-Gore	Unopposed		
Conservative	John Ffolliott	Unopposed		
Registered electors		837		
Conservative hold				
Conservative hold				

=== Elections in the 1850s ===
Ffolliott resigned by accepting the office of Steward of the Chiltern Hundreds, causing a by-election.

By-election, 12 March 1850: County Sligo
Party	Candidate	Votes	%	±%
Conservative	Robert Gore-Booth	Unopposed		
Conservative hold				

General election 1852: County Sligo (2 seats)
Party	Candidate	Votes	%	±%
Conservative	Robert Gore-Booth	943	35.9	N/A
Independent Irish	Richard Swift	870	33.1	New
Conservative	William Ormsby-Gore	774	29.5	N/A
Whig	John Taaffe	39	1.5	New
Turnout		1,313 (est)	62.4 (est)	N/A
Registered electors		2,105		
Majority		73	2.8	N/A
Conservative hold		Swing	N/A	
Majority		96	3.6	N/A
Independent Irish gain from Conservative		Swing	N/A	

General election 1857: County Sligo (2 seats)
Party	Candidate	Votes	%	±%
Conservative	Robert Gore-Booth	1,471	45.2	+9.3
Conservative	Edward Joshua Cooper	1,471	45.2	+15.7
Whig	John Ball	305	9.4	+7.9
Independent Irish	Richard Swift	5	0.2	−32.9
Majority		1,166	35.9	+33.1
Turnout		1,776 (est)	74.3 (est)	+11.9
Registered electors		2,389		
Conservative hold		Swing	+12.9	
Conservative gain from Independent Irish		Swing	+16.1	

General election 1859: County Sligo (2 seats)
Party	Candidate	Votes	%	±%
Conservative	Robert Gore-Booth	Unopposed		
Conservative	Charles William Cooper	Unopposed		
Registered electors		2,445		
Conservative hold				
Conservative hold				

=== Elections in the 1860s ===
General election 1865: County Sligo (2 seats)
Party	Candidate	Votes	%	±%
Conservative	Edward Henry Cooper	Unopposed		
Conservative	Robert Gore-Booth	Unopposed		
Registered electors		3,181		
Conservative hold				
Conservative hold				

General election 1868: County Sligo (2 seats)
Party	Candidate	Votes	%	±%
Liberal	Denis Maurice O'Conor	1,671	41.7	New
Conservative	Robert Gore-Booth	1,208	30.1	N/A
Conservative	Edward Henry Cooper	1,129	28.2	N/A
Liberal	Cornelius Alexander Keogh	2	0.0	New
Turnout		2,840 (est)	87.8 (est)	N/A
Registered electors		3,233		
Majority		542	13.5	N/A
Liberal gain from Conservative		Swing	N/A	
Majority		1,206	2.9	N/A
Conservative hold		Swing	N/A	

=== Elections in the 1870s ===
General election 1874: County Sligo (2 seats)
Party	Candidate	Votes	%	±%
Home Rule	Denis Maurice O'Conor	Unopposed		
Conservative	Robert Gore-Booth	Unopposed		
Registered electors		3,539		
Home Rule gain from Liberal				
Conservative hold				

Gore-Booth's death caused a by-election.

By-election, 12 Jan 1877: County Sligo (1 seat)
Party	Candidate	Votes	%	±%
Home Rule	Edward King-Harman	Unopposed		
Registered electors		3,414		
Home Rule gain from Conservative				

=== Elections in the 1880s ===
General election 1880: County Sligo (2 seats)
Party	Candidate	Votes	%	±%
Parnellite Home Rule League	Thomas Sexton	1,591	36.1	N/A
Home Rule	Denis Maurice O'Conor	1,551	35.2	N/A
Home Rule	Edward King-Harman	1,267	28.7	N/A
Majority		284	6.5	N/A
Turnout		2,205 (est)	67.7 (est)	N/A
Registered electors		3,256		
Home Rule gain from Conservative		Swing	N/A	
Home Rule hold		Swing	N/A	

O'Conor's death caused a by-election.

By-election, 18 Aug 1883: County Sligo (1 seat)
Party	Candidate	Votes	%	±%
Irish Parliamentary	Nicholas Lynch (MP)	1,545	61.1	N/A
Conservative	Charles Kane O'Hara	983	38.9	New
Majority		562	22.2	N/A
Turnout		2,528	79.6	+11.9
Registered electors		3,174		
Irish Parliamentary hold		Swing		
