= Charles O'Hara (politician) =

Irish landowner and Member of Parliament (1746–1822)

Charles O'Hara (16 April 1746 – 19 September 1822) was an Irish landowner and politician.

He was born the son of Charles O'Hara (1715–1776) of Annaghmore, County Sligo, an MP in the Parliament of Ireland. He was educated at Christ Church, Oxford and entered the Middle Temple in 1765 to study law. He was called to the Irish bar in 1771 and succeeded his father in 1776.

He was then the leading landowner in Count Sligo and was a Member of Parliament in the Parliament of Ireland for Dungannon in 1776, sitting until 1783. He was afterwards MP for County Sligo from 1783 until the Union with Great Britain in 1800/01. After the Union he served as MP for County Sligo in the Parliament of the United Kingdom from 1801 to 1822. He also served as High Sheriff of Sligo for 1785–86 and as a Commissioner of the treasury in Ireland from April 1806 to April 1807.

He married Margaret, the daughter and heiress of John Cookson, MD, of Yorkshire, with whom he had a son and 3 daughters.

Parliament of Ireland
Preceded by Owen Wynne; Joshua Cooper	Member of Parliament for County Sligo; 1783–1800; With: Owen Wynne; Joshua Edward Cooper	Succeeded by Parliament of the United Kingdom
Parliament of the United Kingdom
Preceded by Parliament of Ireland	Member of Parliament for County Sligo; 1801–1822; With: Joshua Edward Cooper; Edward Synge Cooper	Succeeded by Edward Synge Cooper; Henry King
