= Arthur Beavor Wynne =

Anglo-Irish geologist

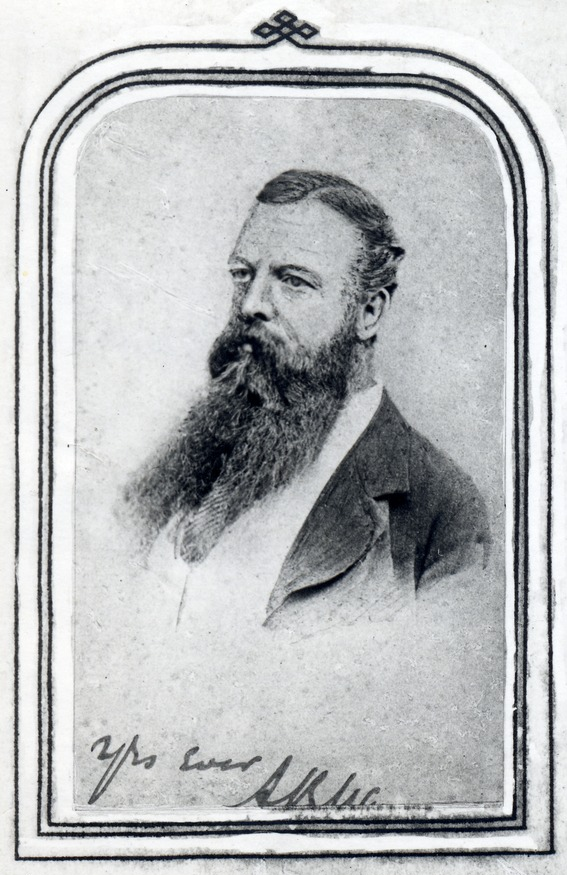

Arthur Beavor Wynne (15 October 1837 – 22 December 1906) was an Anglo-Irish geologist who worked in Geological Survey of India. He worked on stratigraphy of the Himalayas, and the geology of parts of western India.

He was born in Sligo, the son of Richard Beavor Wynne, who, after the passage of the Slave Compensation Act 1837, had received £1,307 in compensation for 91 slaves on the Virgin Islands. A grandson of Owen Wynne (1723-1789) of Hazelwood House, Co. Sligo - and his mother was Hannah Matilda Taafe Irwin. He joined the Geological Survey of Ireland in 1855 and moved to the Indian Geological Survey in 1862. After working for 11 years, he retired due to ill health and in 1883, he rejoined the Irish Survey. He became a president of the Royal Geological Society of Ireland in 1889. He died in Switzerland.

His works included his notes on the geology of Kutch and Bombay.

He was an uncle of Kathleen Lynn, a pioneer of medical services for children in Ireland and chief medical officer to the Irish Citizens' Army in the Easter Rising of 1916.
