= Alfred Mordaunt Egerton =

English soldier and courtier (1843–1908)

Sir Alfred Mordaunt Egerton
- Born: 30 March 1843
- Died: 26 May 1908 (aged 65)
- Military career
- Allegiance: United Kingdom
- Branch: British Army
- Service years: 1861–1888
- Rank: Colonel
- Awards: Knight Commander of the Royal Victorian Order; Companion of the Order of the Bath; Commander 1st Class of the Order of Philip the Magnanimous (Hesse); Order of Saint Anna, 2nd Class (Russia); Commander of the Order of the Redeemer (Greece); Commander of the Order of the North Star (Norway)

Colonel Sir Alfred Mordaunt Egerton, KCVO, CB (30 March 1843 – 26 May 1908) was an English soldier and courtier.

== Early life and family ==
Alfred Mordaunt Egerton was born on 30 March 1843, the youngest son of the Rev. Thomas Egerton and his wife, Charlotte, daughter of Sir William Milner, Baronet. In 1878, he married the Honourable Mary Georgina Ormsby-Gore, DStJ, the daughter of William Ormsby-Gore, 2nd Baron Harlech; she was a Lady-in-waiting to the Duchess of Connaught.

They had four sons:

- Lieutenant Colonel Arthur George Edward Egerton (1879–1915), who was killed in action in the First World War;
- Captain Louis Edwin William Egerton (1880–1917), an alumnus of Christ Church, Oxford, and an officer in the Royal Buckinghamshire Hussars also killed in action during the First World War;
- Major Josslyn Seymour Egerton (1883–1946), sometime Page of Honour to Queen Victoria, and an officer in the British Army;
- Sir Alfred Charles Glyn Egerton (1886–1959), the chemist.

== Military and court career ==
Egerton was schooled at Eton College between 1856 and 1859. In 1861, he purchased a commission as an ensign in the Rifle Brigade. He served with the 2nd Battalion in India from 1863 to 1866, purchasing a promotion to lieutenant in 1865. Egerton was subsequently with the 1st Battalion of the Rifle Brigade in Canada (1866–68) and then moved over to the Royal Horse Guards in 1869.

By then a captain, in 1878 the Duke of Connaught appointed Egerton his equerry in the room of Lieutenant Colonel Arthur Frederick Pickard. In 1881, he was promoted to major and in 1888 retired with the honorary rank of colonel. He served as Comptroller and Treasurer to the Duke of Connaught from 1890. A keen shooter, rower, cricketer and cyclist, for his royal service Egerton was appointed a Companion of the Order of the Bath in 1896, and a Commander (1901) and then Knight Commander (1905) of the Royal Victorian Order. He died on 26 May 1908. In 2011, Bonhams auctioned his set of medals and orders for £62,400, including the Commander 1st Class's badge of the Order of Philip of Hesse, the 2nd class badge of the Russian Order of St Anne, the Commander's badges of the Greek Order of the Redeemer and the Swedish Order of the North Star.

== Likenesses ==
- Photograph by Orlando Norie (c. 1887) in the Royal Collection; albumen print with watercolour border, ref. number RCIN 2502635.
