= Arthur Frederick Pickard =

Recipient of the Victoria Cross

Arthur Frederick Pickard VC CB
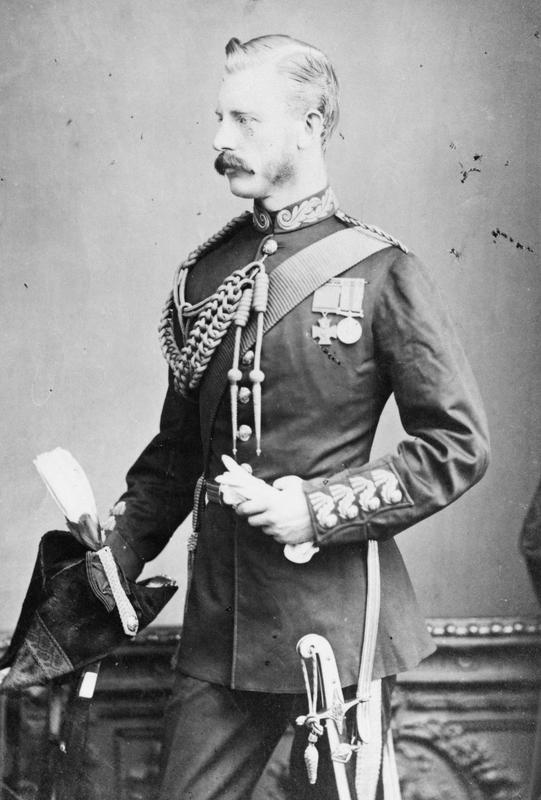
- Arthur William Pickard, c. 1875
- Born: 12 April 1844; Worksop, England
- Died: 1 March 1880 (aged 35); Cannes, France
- Burial place: Cimitiere Protestant du Grand Jus, Cannes
- Military career
- Allegiance: United Kingdom
- Branch: (United Kingdom of Great Britain and Ireland) British Army
- Rank: Lieutenant colonel
- Units: Royal Artillery
- Campaigns: New Zealand Wars; Invasion of Waikato
- Awards: Victoria Cross; Companion of the Order of the Bath; Order of Saint Stanislaus (Russia); Order of Leopold (Austria)

Lieutenant Colonel Arthur Frederick Pickard VC CB (12 April 1844 – 1 March 1880) was a British Army officer and courtier. For his actions in New Zealand in 1863, he was awarded the Victoria Cross, the highest award for gallantry in the face of the enemy that can be awarded to British and Commonwealth forces. After further service and promotion in the Royal Artillery, Pickard was appointed an Equerry to the Duke of Connaught and Strathearn in 1871; seven years later, he was made Assistant Keeper of the Privy Purse and Assistant Private Secretary to the Queen and promoted to lieutenant colonel, but died of tuberculosis in France, aged 35, less than two years later.

== Early life ==
Pickard was born on 12 April 1844 at Forest Hill in the Nottinghamshire town of Worksop. He was the third son of a former officer in the Royal Artillery, Henry William Pickard (1794–1873), JP, of Sturminster Marshall, Dorset, and 11 Carlton Crescent, Southampton, and his wife, Elizabeth, daughter of John Fullerton, of Thrybergh Park in Yorkshire. The Pickard family claimed descent from a medieval Lord Mayor of London; in the 18th century, Jocelyn Pickard, a barrister from Lincoln's Inn, moved to Bloxworth House in Dorset and married a Dorsetshire heiress; Henry William Pickard was his great-grandson in the direct male-line, although he was his father's youngest son.

== Military and court career ==
In 1858, Gentleman Cadet Pickard was promoted to the rank of lieutenant in the Royal Artillery . In May 1871, Pickard was appointed Equerry to Prince Arthur, later the Duke of Connaught and Strathearn; later that year, he was promoted to the rank of second captain, and in 1872 to brevet major. In December 1877, the Queen appointed Pickard a groom-in-waiting after the resignation of Lieutenant-Colonel William Henry Frederick Cavendish; the following year, he was promoted to the rank of lieutenant colonel and in July he stepped aside as Connaught's Equerry, when he was appointed Extra Equerry and Captain Alfred Mordaunt Egerton replaced him. Later that year, the Queen appointed him Assistant Keeper of the Privy Purse, and her Assistant Private Secretary, and shortly afterwards, he was promoted to the full rank of major. In March 1879, he was appointed a Companion of the Order of the Bath.

=== Victoria Cross ===
When Pickard was a 19-year-old lieutenant, he was serving in the Invasion of Waikato (one of the campaigns in the New Zealand Wars); he and Assistant Surgeon William Temple were awarded the Victoria Cross, the United Kingdom's highest bravery award, for the following deed, which took place on 20 November 1863 at Rangiriri, New Zealand. His citation reads:

For gallant conduct during the assault on the enemy's position at Rangiriri, in New Zealand, on the 20th of November last, in exposing their lives to imminent danger, in crossing the entrance of the Maori keep, at a point upon which the enemy had concentrated their fire, with a view to render assistance to the wounded, and, more especially to the late Captain Mercer, of the Royal Artillery. Lieutenant Pickard, it is stated, crossed, and re-crossed the parapet, to procure water for the wounded, when none of the men could be induced to perform this service, the space over which he traversed being exposed to a crossfire; and testimony is borne to the calmness displayed by him, and Assistant-Surgeon Temple, under the trying circumstances in which they were placed.

=== Death ===
On 1 March 1880, Pickard died at Cannes, in France, reportedly of tuberculosis. He was buried at the city's Grand Jas Cemetery. His medal group – consisting of his Victoria Cross, the insignia of the Order of the Bath, the Russian Order of St Stanislas and the Austrian Order of Leopold, and his New Zealand War Medal – were purchased at auction in New Zealand on behalf of the Michael Ashcroft Trust in 2002. They are on display at the Lord Ashcroft Gallery in the Imperial War Museum in London.
