= Hazelwood House, Sligo =

Palladian house in County Sligo, Ireland

Hazelwood House
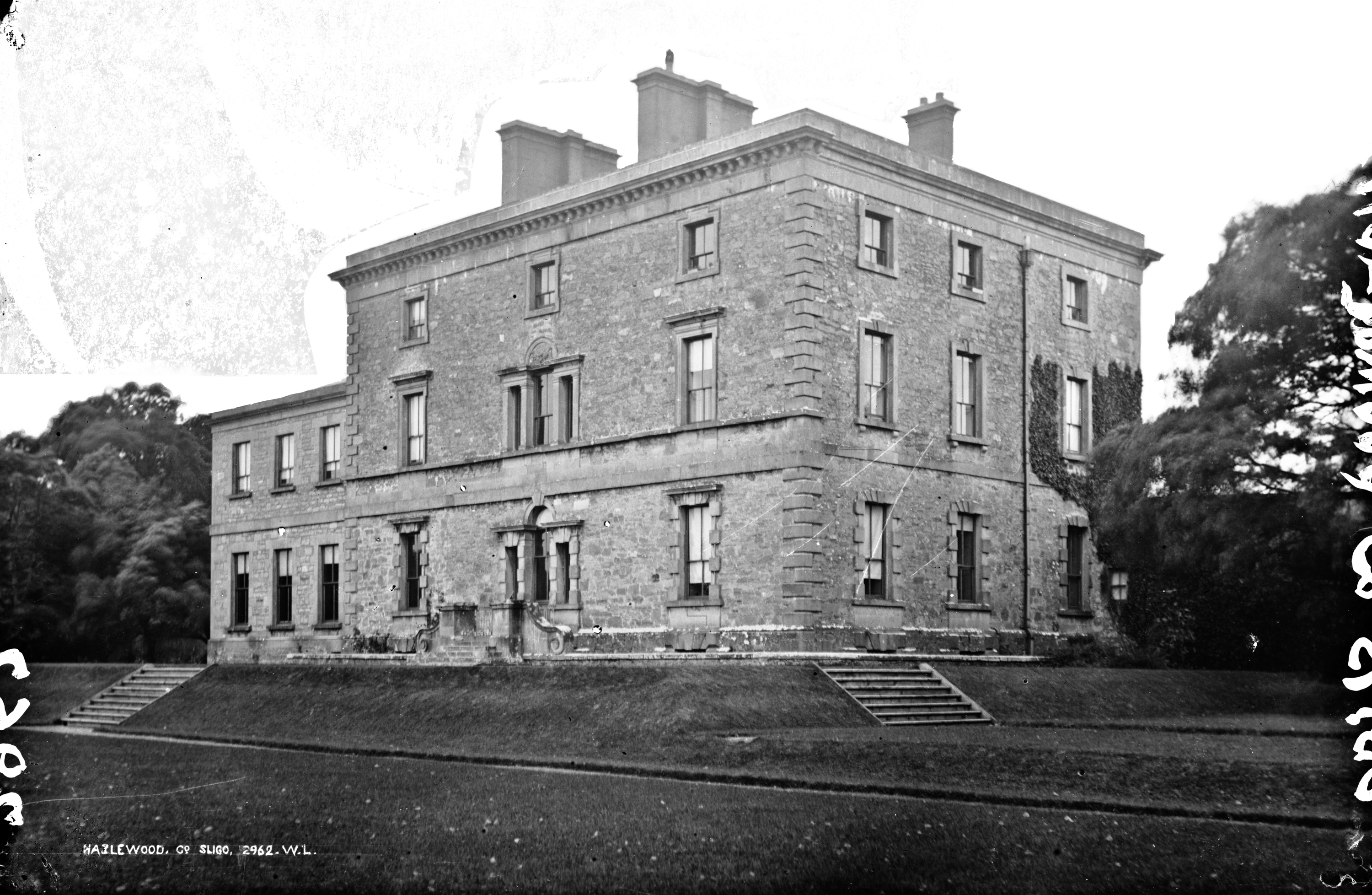
- View of Hazelwood House, 1900

- Location within Ireland

General information
- Status: Protected structure
- Type: House
- Architectural style: Palladian
- Classification: Derelict
- Location: Sligo, Ireland
- Coordinates: 54.2565°N 8.4339°W
- Estimated completion: 1731
- Owner: David Raethorne

Technical details
- Material: limestone
- Floor count: 3

Design and construction
- Architect: Richard Cassels
- Developer: Owen Wynne

Hazelwood House is an 18th-century Palladian style country house located in the parish of Calry in the north of County Sligo in the west of Ireland. The house, which is located in a 70-acre (28 ha) demesne approximately 2 miles (3 km) south-east of Sligo town, is a protected structure. Hazelwood, an ancient area of woodland, forms part of the original estate.

== Location ==
Situated on a peninsula jutting into Lough Gill, just east of Sligo Town, with views of Ben Bulben to the north, the house stands in a wooded estate originally 15,000 acres (6,100 ha) in extent, but now reduced to a demesne of 81 acres (33 ha).

== Architecture ==
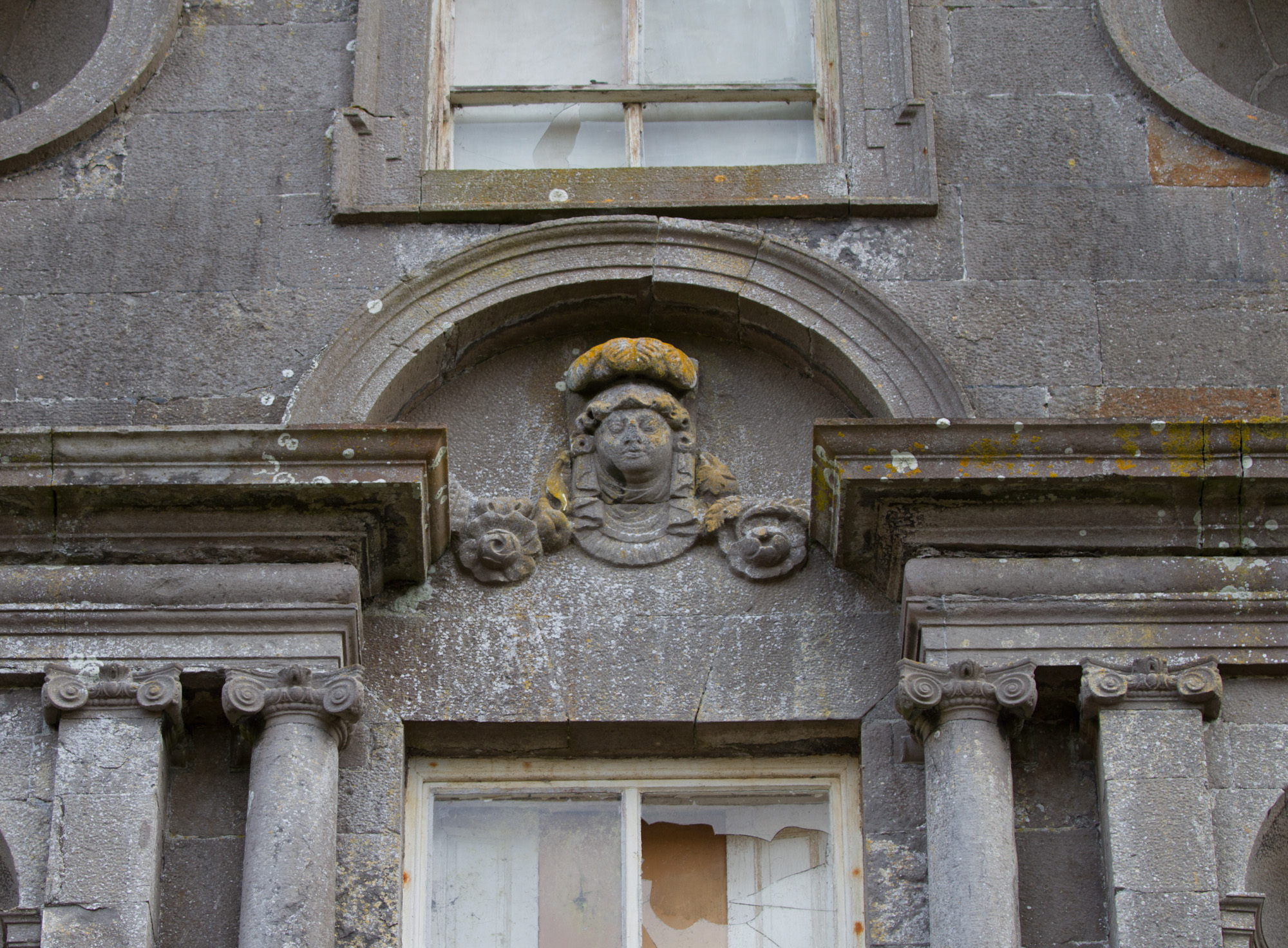
External architectural features

The house was likely the first Palladian house in Ireland designed by Richard Cassels in 1731, the architect who also designed Leinster House, Powerscourt House and Russborough House.

It consists of a 5-bay by 3-bay main block in three storeys with 2-storey wings on either side connected to the main block by single-storey quadrants. The building is constructed of limestone ashlar with slate roofs.

Since construction, the house saw several decades of neglect and alteration. For example, in the 1870s, a three-bay, two-storey wing was added on the western side of the main block. The main staircase was removed in the 1950s and replaced with a concrete flight of stairs. A number of chimney pieces were taken and replaced with replicas.

The building's entry in the National Inventory of Architectural Heritage (NIAH) database describes it as one of County Sligo's "most neglected treasures", and of architectural, social and historical value. It is listed on the Record of Protected Structures for the Sligo County Council administrative area.

== History ==
The original name for the area is Annagh (Irish: Eanach), meaning "marsh", and was on land belonging to the Ó Conchobhair Sligigh (O'Conor Sligo), who were the Gaelic lords of the territory of Cairbre Drom Cliabh.

There was an O'Conor castle located here that, according to O'Rorke (1889), was located at Castle Point on Lough Gill, south of the present house.

This area belonged to the O'Conors throughout the Medieval period, before passing to Andrew Crean, a wealthy merchant in nearby Sligo Town, in the early 17th century. The estate was later purchased by Thomas Wentworth, the 1st Earl of Strafford (better known as Lord Wentworth; 1593–1641).

In 1635, during the planning for the aborted Plantation of Connacht, the estate was bought by Sir Phillip Perceval, who was acting secretly on behalf of the 1st Viscount Wentworth (who was later created the 1st Earl of Strafford in 1640), Lord Deputy of Ireland, and Sir George Radcliffe. Subsequent allegations claimed that Perceval tricked O'Conor into selling by claiming that it belonged to the Crown and would be subject to Plantation without any recompense to O'Conor. The hostility created by this was instrumental in the Gaelic gentry in County Sligo taking part in the 1641 rebellion.

In 1687, the estate went to Thomas Wilson and later, in 1722, it went to the Wynne family.

=== Wynne family ===
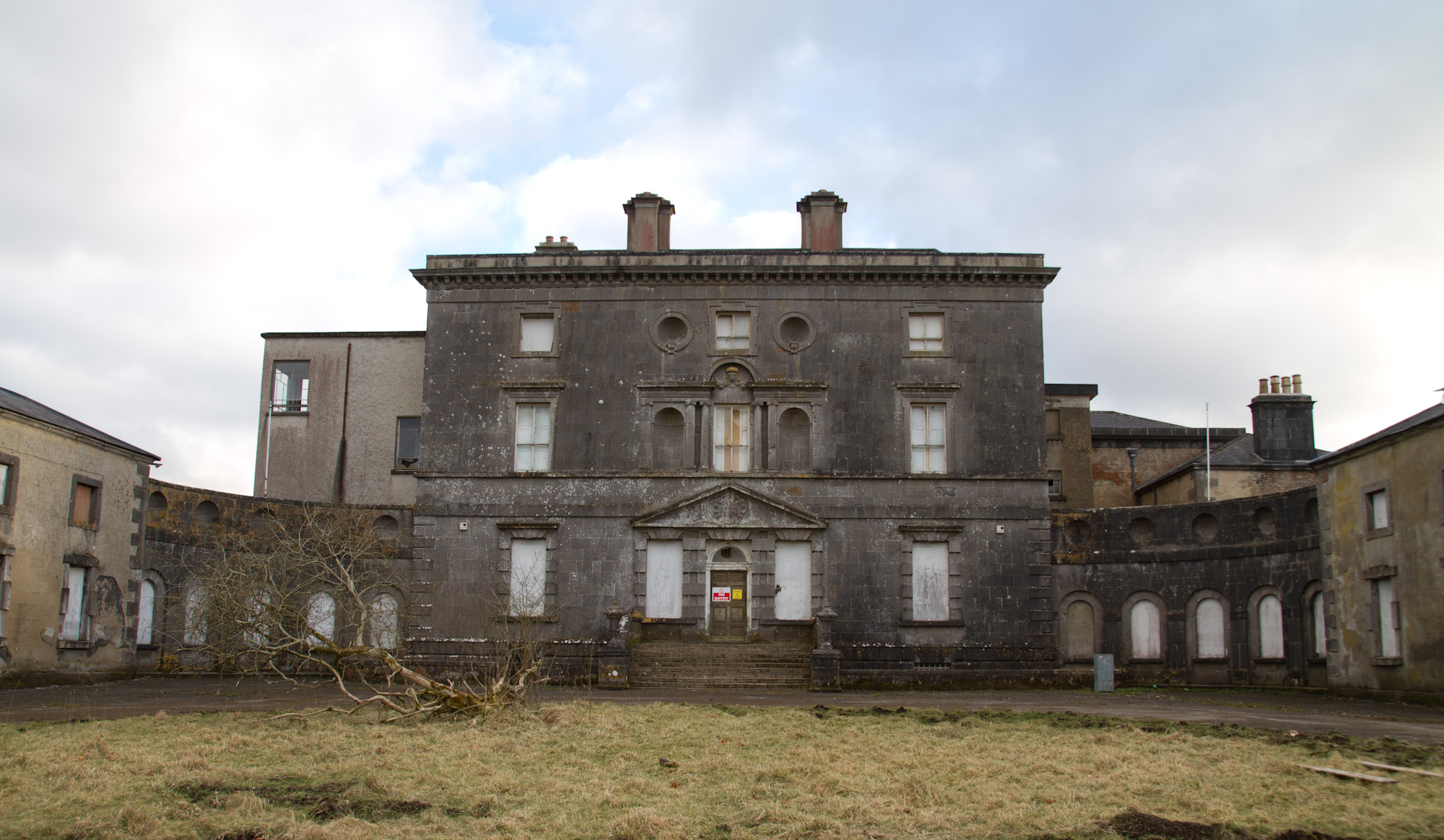
Front facade of Hazelwood House

Lt-Gen. Owen Wynne, a descendant of the Welsh Wynne family of Merioneth, descendants of Osborn Fitzgerald, purchased the estate in 1722. In addition to the 14,500 acres (5,900 ha), the conveyance also included extensive property within the Borough of Sligo, together with the fairs, markets and tolls.

On his death in 1737, the estate passed to his nephew, M.P. Owen Wynne (1687–1756) who was also an army officer. He was succeeded by his son, a third Owen, who was High Sheriff of Sligo for 1723 and 1745. The house then passed to the latter's son, a fourth Owen Wynne (1723–1789), who was an M.P. for County Sligo in the Irish Parliament and an Irish Privy Counsellor.

His eldest son, a fifth Owen Wynne (1755–1841), inherited the house on his death and was also an M.P. for County Sligo in the Irish Parliament and High Sheriff. It was during this period of ownership in 1822 that new gate lodges and adjacent houses on the land were designed by Martin Geraghty.

He was followed by his son, John Arthur Wynne (1801–1865), MP for Sligo and High Sheriff for 1840, and John Arthur's son, a sixth Owen (1843–1910), High Sheriff for 1874.

The sixth Owen Wynne was the last Wynne to occupy Hazelwood House and died without a male heir in 1910. His daughter Murial and her husband Philip Dudley Percival then occupied the house, selling off the livestock and machinery until they left Hazelwood in 1923.

Although the sixth Owen Wynne died without male heirs, the wider family survived through the descendants of the fourth M.P. Owen Wynne (1723–1789), in particular.

His descendants include the Archdeacon George Robert Wynne, author Emily Wynne, artist Gladys Wynne, General Sir Arthur Wynne, geologist Arthur Beavor Wynne, doctor Kathleen Lynn and minister Canon Billy Wynne.

=== 20th century ===
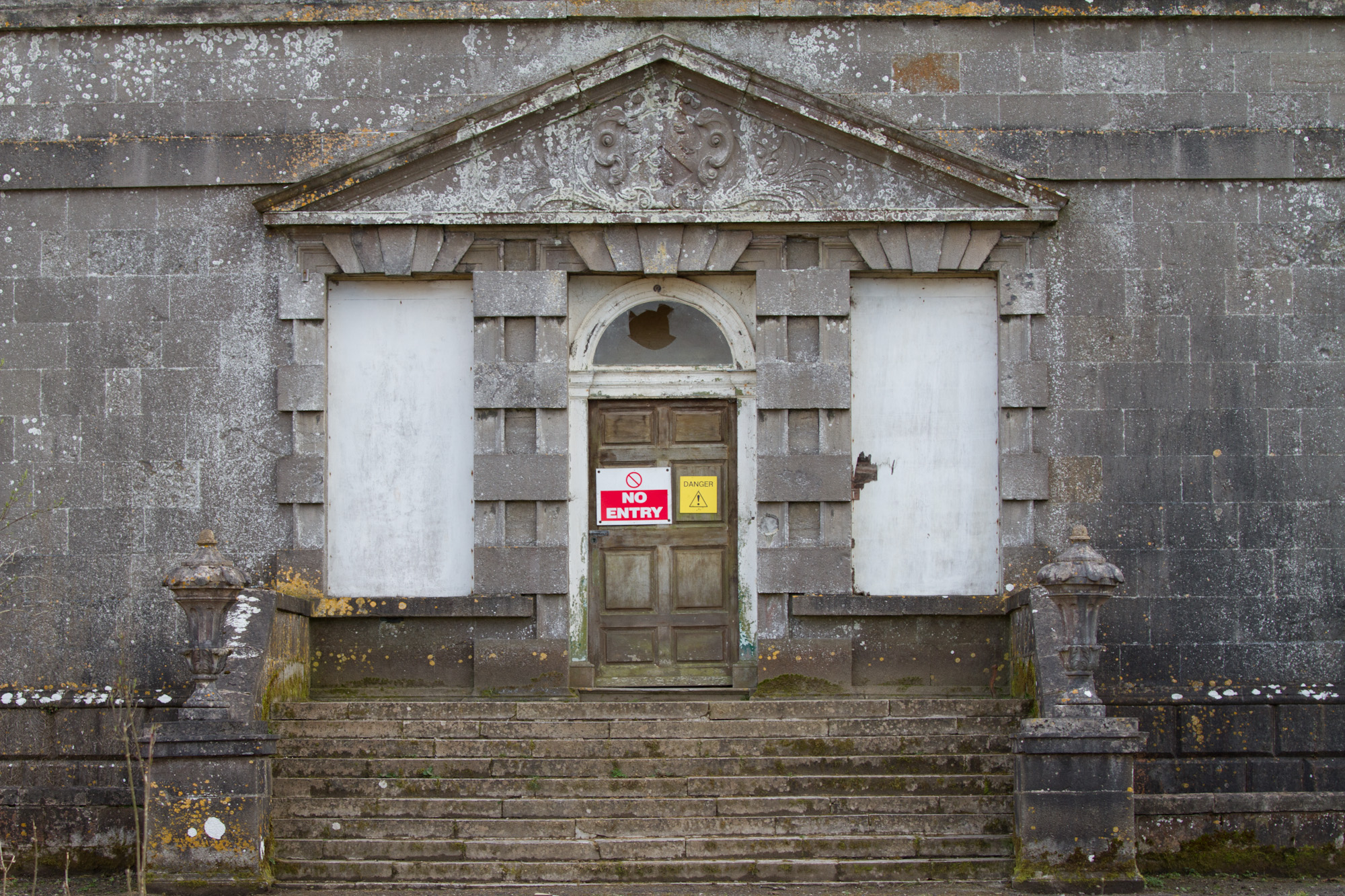
Hazelwood's boarded up doorway (2011)

The house then stood empty until 1930, when a retired tea planter named Berridge lived there, carrying out repairs and renovations before the house and lands were sold to the Land Commission and the State Forestry Department in 1937.

In 1940 the house was occupied by the Irish Army's 12th Cyclist Squadron and served as their barracks until January 1945.

In 1946 it was sold to the Department of Health for use as a psychiatric hospital.

In c.1969 it was sold again to the Italian manufacturing company SNIA S.p.A. to use as part of a nylon yarn factory complex which they built to the rear of the house. The factory closed in 1983 and was acquired in 1987 by the South Korean company SaeHan Information Systems, who produced video tapes on the site until 2005.

=== Later history ===
The property was sold in April 2006 for €7-€10 million to a local consortium, Foresthaze Developments, who applied in 2007 for permission to develop the site. The application was refused by Sligo County Council and the owners served with a notice to improve the fabric of the building to ensure its preservation. Foresthaze Developments was placed in receivership in October 2013. The house was empty from 2005 to 2015, and fell into poor condition with water damage to the West wing. Members of the community founded an action group, "Hazelwood Heritage Society", to campaign for the restoration of the house and its grounds.

In 2015, the estate was purchased by Hazelwood Demesne Limited, which was founded by Irish investor David Raethorne to establish a whiskey distillery on the estate. The new owners secured planning permission to repurpose the former factory into a single malt whiskey distillery in early 2016, and construction of the distillery started shortly thereafter. The Lough Gill Distillery was fully commissioned in 2019, and opened in December of that year.
