= 1877 County Sligo by-election =

UK Parliamentary by-election

A by-election took place in County Sligo on 12 January 1877. It was fought due to the death of the incumbent Conservative MP, Sir Robert Gore-Booth. It was won by the Home Rule League candidate Edward King-Harman.
