= Edward Synge Cooper =

Irish landowner and politician

Edward Synge Cooper (5 March 1762 – 16 August 1830) was an Irish landowner and politician from County Sligo. He sat in the House of Commons of the United Kingdom from 1806 to 1830.

Cooper was the second son of Joshua Cooper MP (1732–1800) of Markree Castle, and his wife Alicia, daughter of Edward Synge, Bishop of Elphin. He was educated by Rev. Richard Norris in Drogheda, and then at Trinity College Dublin. In 1801 he married Anne Verelst, daughter of Bengal Governor Harry Verelst of Aston Hall, Yorkshire. They had three sons.

At the 1806 general election he was elected as one of the two Members of Parliament (MPs) for County Sligo, succeeding his older brother Joshua Edward Cooper, who was deranged. He also took over the management of the family estate.

In his first Parliament, he was a regular attender but took little active role, preferring "to look about me". In his second Parliament, he claimed credit for having helped secure the passage of the Highways (Ireland) Act 1809, which reformed the role of grand juries, and from 1810 onwards he opposed Catholic relief.

He died on 16 August 1830, shortly after standing down from Parliament at the 1830 general election. His son Edward Joshua Cooper, who had been elected in his place in 1830, inherited Markree in 1837 on the death of Joshua Edward Cooper.

His second wife Anne survived her husband and all three of her sons. She died in November 1864, at Dunboden, County Westmeath, aged 92. Her oldest son Edward Joshua had died a year before her in 1863, her second son Joshua Henry died in infancy, and her youngest son Richard died in 1850.

Parliament of the United Kingdom
Preceded by Charles O'Hara; Joshua Edward Cooper	Member of Parliament for County Sligo; 1806–1830; With: Charles O'Hara to 1822; Henry King from 1822	Succeeded by Henry King; Edward Joshua Cooper
