= Gladys Wynne =

Irish watercolour painter

- Born: 1876
- Died: 1968 (aged 91–92)
- Known for: Painting
- Style: Landscape

Edith Gladys Wynne (27 June 1876 – 24 March 1968) was an Irish watercolour artist who spent most of her life in Glendalough, County Wicklow. She painted the area and landscape throughout her career.

== Work ==
Although Co. Wicklow, and particularly Glendalough, had a huge influence on Wynne and are strongly represented in her work, there were also other influences. She visited Florence and Rome as part of her art education and she also travelled in Germany. Evidence of her travels can be seen in a number of her painted scenes of Italy and a book she wrote on architectural history for children which was first published by Thomas Nelson in about 1913.

From 1902 until 1963, Wynne exhibited regularly with the Watercolour Society of Ireland. She also exhibited with the Belfast Art Society and the Dublin Sketching Club. Apart from the Glendalough area, subjects included Killarney, the Bog of Allen, the County Dublin coast, and County Donegal. Her work is signed 'G. Wynne'.

In her history of Irish watercolours published in 1990, Patricia Butler describes Wynne's early work as displaying a strong sense of space, colour and light with later works having less sense of freedom. Wynne is included in the National Gallery of Ireland's guide to Irish women artists published to accompany an exhibition in 1987 and in Theo Snoddy's Dictionary of Irish artists.

== Biography ==
Wynne was born at Holywood, County Down where her father, George Robert Wynne, was the Church of Ireland rector. She was a great-granddaughter of Owen Wynne (1723–1789) of Hazelwood House, Sligo. Her mother, Ellen Lees Smith, was the daughter of the Rev. G. Sidney Smith. Gladys had one brother and four sisters. Her brother, George Robert Llewellyn Wynne (known as Llewy), became a Church of Ireland rector like his father.

Wynne's father moved several times during his ministry. After Holywood, Co. Down, he was Rector of Killarney from 1880 to 1904 and Rector of St. Michael's in Limerick from 1904 to 1910. He retired to live in Glendalough in 1910 where Wynne cousins owned property.

Wynne, who never married, appears to have continued living with her parents well into adulthood. She is recorded as being at her father's address in the 1911 census. After her father's death in 1912, Wynne continued to live in Glendalough for the rest of her life and she died there at the age of 91. Writing just after her death, Tom Nisbet, a fellow watercolour artist, described her as a ‘marvellous woman, selfless in her devotion to those who needed her; blest with a radiant friendliness, a rare talent for refined, atmospheric water colour painting and a lively wit that was innocent of malice’.
