= Richard Swift (politician) =

Irish politician, died 1872

Member of Parliament for County Sligo
- In office 26 July 1852 – 11 April 1857 Serving with Robert Gore-Booth
- Preceded by: Robert Gore-Booth; William Ormsby-Gore
- Succeeded by: Robert Gore-Booth; Edward Joshua Cooper

Personal details
- Born: 1811
- Died: 24 March 1872 (aged 60–61)
- Party: Independent Irish

Richard Swift (1811 – 24 March 1872) was an Irish Independent Irish Party politician.

== Political career ==
Swift was elected Independent Irish Party MP for County Sligo at the 1852 general election and held the seat until 1857 when he was defeated, ending fourth and last in that year's poll.

Parliament of the United Kingdom
| Preceded by Robert Gore-Booth; William Ormsby-Gore | Member of Parliament for County Sligo; 1852–1857; With: Robert Gore-Booth | Succeeded by Robert Gore-Booth; Edward Joshua Cooper |
