= William Temple (VC) =

British Army officer (1833–1919)

William Temple VC
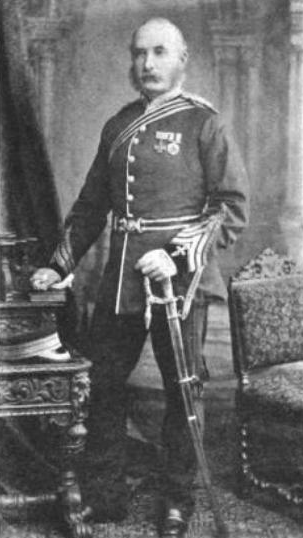
- Born: 7 November 1833; Monaghan Town, Ireland
- Died: 13 February 1919 (aged 85); Tunbridge Wells, England
- Military career
- Allegiance: United Kingdom
- Branch: British Army
- Rank: Lieutenant Colonel
- Units: Royal Artillery
- Conflicts: New Zealand Wars: Invasion of Waikato

Lieutenant Colonel William Temple VC (7 November 1833 – 13 February 1919) was a British Army officer and an Irish recipient of the Victoria Cross (VC), the highest award for gallantry in the face of the enemy that can be awarded to British and Commonwealth forces.

== Early life ==
Temple was born in Monaghan Town, Ireland, on 7 November 1833.

== Victoria Cross ==
Temple was 30 years old and an Assistant Surgeon in the Royal Regiment of Artillery during the Invasion of Waikato (one of the campaigns in the New Zealand Wars), when the following deed took place on 20 November 1863 at Rangiriri, New Zealand for which he and Lieutenant Arthur Frederick Pickard were awarded the VC:

For gallant conduct during the assault on the enemy's position at Rangiriri, in New Zealand, on the 20th of November last, in exposing their lives to imminent danger, in crossing the entrance of the Maori keep, at a point upon which the enemy had concentrated their fire, with a view to render assistance to the wounded, and, more especially to the late Captain Mercer, of the Royal Artillery. Lieutenant Pickard, it is stated, crossed, and re-crossed the parapet, to procure water for the wounded, when none of the men could be induced to perform this service, the space over which he traversed being exposed to a crossfire; and testimony is borne to the calmness displayed by him, and Assistant-Surgeon Temple, under the trying circumstances in which they were placed.

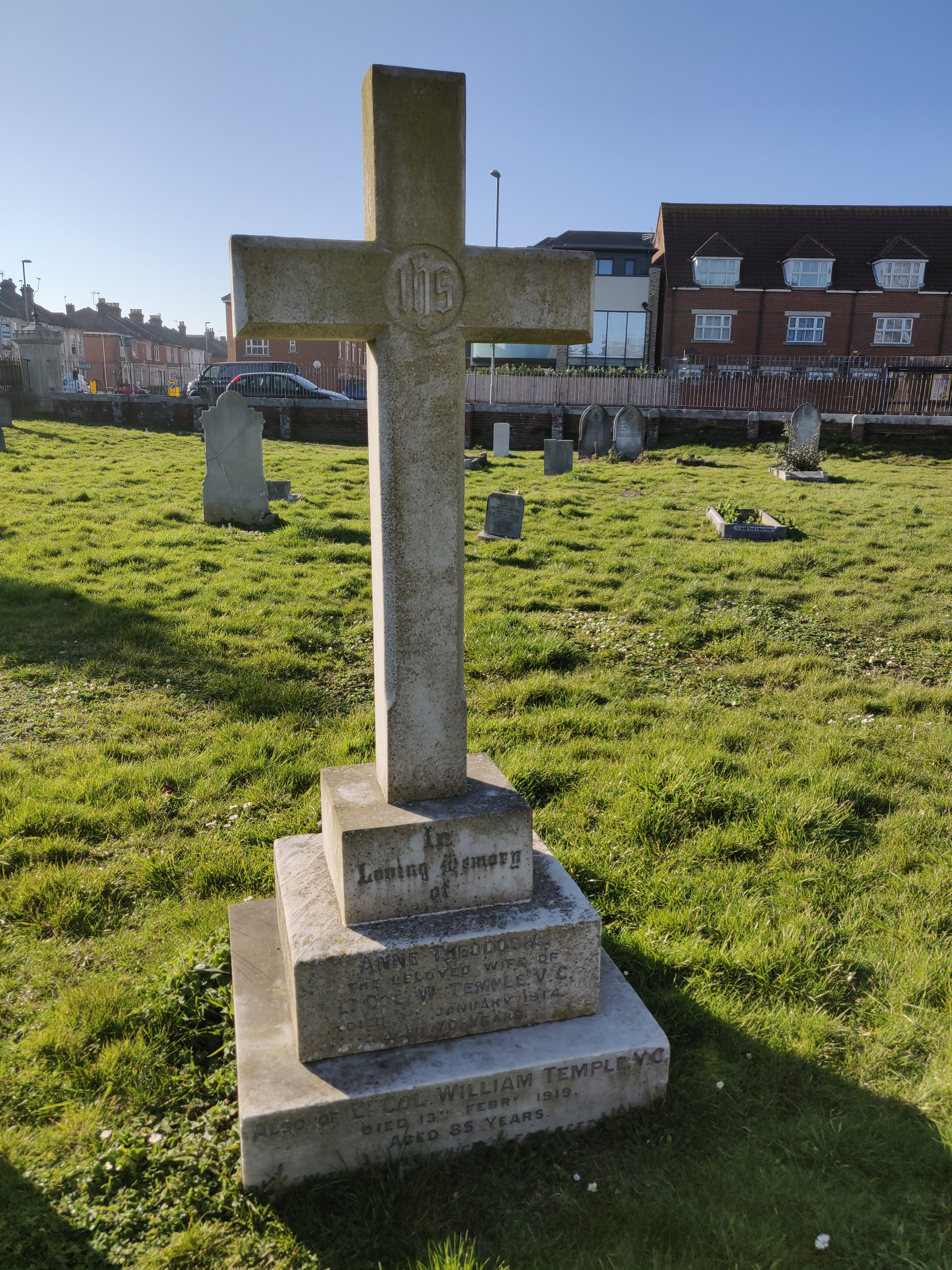
Grave of William Temple V.C.

From 1884 until 1889 he served in India as a lieutenant colonel and secretary to the surgeon-general of the Indian Medical Service. On 10 April 1885 he became brigade surgeon and from 1886 until 1889 was honorary surgeon to the Viceroy of India. Temple died in Tunbridge Wells, Kent, and is buried in the Highland Road Cemetery in Portsmouth, Hampshire.
