= County Sligo (Parliament of Ireland constituency) =

Pre-1801 Irish constituency

- Former county constituency for the Irish House of Commons
- County: County Sligo

–1801
- Seats: 2
- Replaced by: County Sligo (UKHC)

County Sligo was a constituency represented in the Irish House of Commons until 1800.

== Members of Parliament ==
- 1585 Sir Valentine Browne, James Crofton and John Marbury
- 1613–1615 Brian McDonagh and Thady O'Hara
- 1634–1635 Fearghal Ó Gadhra (Farrell O'Gara) and Tadhg O’Connor Sligo
- 1639–1649 Theobald Taaffe (inherited peerage 1642) and George Radcliffe (replaced April 1641 by Patrick Casey)
- 1661–1666 Sir Francis Gore and Robert Morgan

=== 1689–1801 ===
Election	First MP	Second MP
1689	Henry Crofton	Oliver O'Gara
1692	Hugh Morgan	Edward Wingfield
1713	Chidley Coote	William Ormsby
1719	Joshua Cooper I	William Ormsby
1727	Joshua Cooper I	Owen Wynne
1737	Joshua Cooper I	James Wynne
1749	Joshua Cooper I	Owen Wynne
1757	Benjamin Burton	Owen Wynne
1761	Sir Edward King, 5th Bt	Owen Wynne
1765	Paul Annesley Gore	Owen Wynne
1768	Joshua Cooper II	Owen Wynne
1778	Joshua Cooper II	Owen Wynne
1783	Charles O'Hara	Owen Wynne
1790	Charles O'Hara	Joshua Edward Cooper
1801	Succeeded by Westminster constituency of County Sligo	
