= Robert Wynne (Archdeacon of Aghadoe) =

George Robert Wynne (1838–1912), known as Robert, was a Church of Ireland minister and prolific author of works on religious topics.

He was born in Wicklow on 6 March 1838. His father, also George, was a grandson of Owen Wynne (1723–1789) of Hazelwood House, Co. Sligo, an officer in the British army (2nd. Dragoons, Scots Greys) and later Secretary to the Wicklow Grand Jury. His mother was Clara Frances Wynne, daughter of Rev. Henry Wynne of Killucan, Co. Westmeath and a first cousin of his father.

Wynne was educated at Trinity College, Dublin where he studied Experimental & Natural Science and Divinity. While at Trinity, he was awarded the Vice-Chancellor’s prize for English verse and Hebrew. He obtained his BA in 1861. He continued his academic interests in later life and was awarded an MA in 1875 and a BD and DD in 1889. He was ordained in 1861. His first curacy was of Rathdrum, Co. Wicklow from 1861 to 1862. He was curate of St. Ann’s parish in Dublin from 1862 until 1864 when he became Rector of Whitechurch in south County Dublin. He left Whitechurch in 1871 for Hollywood, Co. Down and then became Rector of Killarney from 1880 to 1904. His final ministry was as Rector of St. Michael’s in Limerick from 1904 to 1910. He was appointed Archdeacon of Aghadoe in 1885. He was made a Canon of St. Patrick’s Cathedral, Dublin in 1889 and of Limerick Cathedral in 1904 and was Chaplain to the Lord Lieutenant of Ireland from 1886 to 1896.

He married Ellen Lees Smith, the daughter of the Revd. G. Sidney Smith, on 6 June 1863 at Aghaven Church, County Fermanagh. They had one son, another George, and five daughters, Helen, Florence, Charlotte, Maria Cerise and Edith Gladys (known as Gladys). Their son, George Robert Llewellyn, became a Church of Ireland rector in his turn, while Gladys became a successful watercolour artist.

The Rev. Wynne was a prolific author, writing many novels with a religious theme as well as general works and journal articles on religious topics. The Daily Express described him as being ‘one of the chief devotional writers in the Irish Church of the present day’. The main catalogue of the British Library contains over 40 works written by him. He also wrote lighter items as illustrated by an article on life in Killarney outside the tourist season. The Church of Ireland Gazette suggested that the busy parish of Hollywood, Co. Down had not suited him and it was the comparative quiet of Killarney that had enabled him to devote time to writing.

As well as theology, his interests included Esperanto (he was a fellow of the British Esperanto Society), meteorology and botany. During his ministry in Killarney he was involved in efforts to improve the lives of the poor through supported emigration to the United States and Canada.

He retired in 1910 to live at the Lodge, Glendalough, Co. Wicklow – then part of an estate owned by Wynne cousins. (The Lodge is now an An Oige Youth Hostel). He died there on 2 May 1912. Writing of him after his death, the Church of Ireland Gazette described him as ‘a charming personality’ who had done ‘great work in his own unobtrusive way’. He was ‘of a type that can hardly be replaced. His death leaves the Irish Church he loved so much the poorer’.
