= William Ormsby-Gore, 2nd Baron Harlech =

British peer, Lord lieutenant and politician

William Richard Ormsby-Gore, 2nd Baron Harlech (3 March 1819 – 26 June 1904), was an Anglo-Irish peer and Member of Parliament.

== Biography ==
Lord Harlech was the younger son of William Ormsby-Gore and Mary Jane Ormsby. He was educated at Eton College and later purchased an Ensigncy in the 53rd Foot. He purchased a Lieutenancy in 1839 and exchanged into the 13th Light Dragoons in 1841, purchasing a Captaincy in 1846 and a Majority in 1852.

In the 1841 general election, Ormsby-Gore was elected unopposed as a Conservative Party MP for County Sligo. In the 1852 general election, there was a contest for the seat and he was defeated by a nationalist-inclined Liberal candidate. He returned to Parliament in a by-election on 17 May 1858 as MP for County Leitrim, a seat he held until 1876.

Ormsby-Gore bought an estate at Derrycarne near Dromod in County Leitrim and went on to rise to high office in the county: he became High Sheriff there for 1857, and was appointed as Lord Lieutenant of County Leitrim in 1878, which he remained until his death.

On 14 January 1876, Ormsby-Gore's elder brother John was created Baron Harlech. As he had no sons, the peerage was created with a special remainder to his younger brother, meaning that he was made heir presumptive of the peerage should the first Baron die without legitimate male heirs. This was an unusual procedure and it was determined at the time that the last such case had been 45 years before. As it happened, the first Baron died on 15 June 1876 and Ormsby-Gore became the second Baron Harlech.

Harlech was appointed by the Lord Lieutenant of Shropshire to be a Deputy Lieutenant of the county on 22 February 1882.

== Marriage and children ==
Lord Harlech married Lady Emily Charlotte Seymour, daughter of Admiral Sir George Francis Seymour and sister of Francis Hugh George Seymour, 5th Marquess of Hertford, in 1850. They had six children:

- Mary Georgina Ormsby-Gore (born 1851, died 28 August 1937), married in 1878 Colonel Sir Alfred Mordaunt Egerton, KCVO, CB (a descendant of the 2nd Earl of Bridgewater) and had issue. She was Lady-in-Waiting to The Duchess of Connaught and to Princess Patricia of Connaught
- William Seymour Ormsby-Gore (born 27 December 1852, died May 1853)
- George Ralph Charles Ormsby-Gore, 3rd Baron Harlech (born 21 January 1855, died 8 May 1938)
- Major Henry Arthur Ormsby-Gore (born 18 March 1857, died 12 March 1921)
- Emily Ormsby-Gore (born 1859, died 12 Jul 1929), married in 1886 Hugh Fortescue, 4th Earl Fortescue and was the mother of Hugh Fortescue, 5th Earl Fortescue and Denzil Fortescue, 6th Earl Fortescue.
- Captain Seymour Fitzroy Ormsby-Gore, FRGS (born 18 January 1863, died 10 November 1950), unmarried, Conservative Member of Parliament for Gainsborough between 1900 and 1906.

Lord Harlech died on 26 June 1904, aged 85, and was succeeded in the barony by his eldest surviving son George.

Coat of arms of William Ormsby-Gore, 2nd Baron Harlech
Notes Coat of arms of the Ormsby-Gore family Coronet A coronet of a Baron Crest 1st: an Heraldic Tiger rampant Argent; 2nd: a Dexter Arm embowed in armour proper holding in the hand a Man's Leg also in armour couped at the thigh Escutcheon Quarterly: 1st and 4th, Gules a Fess between three Cross Crosslets fitchy Or (Gore); 2nd and 3rd, Gules a Bend between six Cross Crosslets Or (Ormsby) Supporters Dexter: an Heraldic Tiger Argent maned and tufted Sable ducally gorged Or; Sinister: a Lion Or Motto In Hoc Signo Vinces (Under this sign thou shalt conquer)

Parliament of the United Kingdom
Preceded by Edward Joshua Cooper; Alexander Perceval	Member of Parliament for County Sligo; 1841–1852; With: Alexander Perceval 1841; John Ffolliott 1841–1850; Sir Robert Gore-Booth, Bt 1850–1852	Succeeded by Sir Robert Gore-Booth, Bt; Richard Swift
Preceded by Hugh Lyons-Montgomery; John Brady	Member of Parliament for County Leitrim; 1858–1876; With: John Brady	Succeeded by John Brady; Francis O'Beirne
Honorary titles
Preceded by The Viscount Southwell	Lord Lieutenant of Leitrim; 1878–1904	Succeeded by The Lord Harlech
Peerage of the United Kingdom
Preceded by John Ormsby-Gore	Baron Harlech; 1876–1904	Succeeded by George Ormsby-Gore
