= Billy Wynne (minister) =

Cleric, founder of the Samaritans in Ireland

Robert William Maurice (Billy) Wynne (1919–2000) was a Church of Ireland minister and the founder of the Samaritans organisation in the Republic of Ireland.

== Education and career ==
Wynne was educated at Portora Royal School in Enniskillen and Kingstown Grammar School. He left school at the age of 15 to work as an apprentice in Drummond's Seed Shop on Dawson Street in Dublin. He began studying for the ministry four years later. Wynne graduated from Trinity College Dublin in 1944 and, following his ordination as deacon, was appointed curate of Clontarf. He then served as curate at Holy Trinity Church, Rathmines before becoming Rector of Delgany in Co. Wicklow in 1952. He became Rector of Monkstown, Co. Dublin in 1958. His final ministry was as Rector of St. Ann's in the centre of Dublin from 1979 until 1987.

Wynne's path to founding a branch of the Samaritans in Dublin began in 1959 when a letter he had written to a fellow clergyman in need of help was seen by Chad Varah, the founder of the Samaritans in England. Varah wrote to Wynne to ask if he would be willing to establish a similar type of service in Ireland. Varah found a willing ally in Wynne. Interviewed in 1983, Wynne explained that ‘I had always thought that Christianity was about compassion, love and caring and having met so many depressed and suicidal persons during my early church days, I often wondered what I could do to help in a practical way’. During the first few years, most of the telephone support was provided by Wynne. Gradually friends and parishioners got involved until in 1970 a Dublin branch of the Samaritans was opened using temporary accommodation in Kildare Street.

The establishment of the Samaritans in the Republic of Ireland was not without opposition. The Roman Catholic Archbishop of Dublin, John Charles McQuaid, considered such a service to be unnecessary. Speaking in 1984, Wynne held that McQuaid ‘… could not be convinced that people who are despairing and suicidal may not feel able to approach a priest. The Archbishop’s argument was that the churches of all denominations had clergy who were skilled in dealing with people in trouble and that there was no need for an outside agency’. Nonetheless, by the time the Dublin branch opened in 1970, two prominent Roman Catholics – the Rev. John F. Brennan SJ and Vincent Grogan SC – were closely involved.

The establishment of the Samaritans in the Republic was far from being Wynne's only initiative to meet social and community needs. He created a 'Friendly Room' in Monkstown's parish hall in the 1960s as a place where people could talk, listen to music, share a coffee together and find companionship regardless of their religion. While he was at St. Ann's, he expanded the church's remit to include providing people with practical help on issues such as housing and social security and access to counselling and other services.

Wynne's commitment to helping people 'in a practical way' was widely recognised. In 1977 he was made a Canon of St. Patrick's Cathedral, Dublin – the National Cathedral of the Church of Ireland. He received a People of the Year Award in 1983 and a Lord Mayor of Dublin's Millennium Award in 1988. He received an honorary Doctorate in Laws from the University of Dublin (Trinity College) in 1996.

Further insight into what motivated Wynne is provided by his recollection of one of his parishioners when he was a young curate. She would often ask him to pray for those tempted to commit suicide. In time he came to think that his parishioner was suffering these thoughts herself but had no one to talk to about them. He also knew from personal experience what it was like to have depression.

Wynne had a reputation for being unconventional. One of his colleagues described him as 'unpredictable', recalling occasions when toy airplanes, tennis balls and a bicycle were used as props to illustrate points Wynne wished to make during his weekly sermons. Wynne, however, saw himself as an 'old conservative' although one who was not afraid of change and of 'breaking old moulds'.

After Wynne retired in 1987 he wrote a fortnightly column in the Irish Times which was subsequently published as a book. He also helped the Missions to Seamen.

== Family ==
Wynne was born on 12 April 1919 into a family with strong connections to the Church of Ireland. His father was the Rev. George Robert Llewellyn Wynne and his grandfather Archdeacon Robert Wynne. His mother, Alice Deane, was from a family of Barbadian sugar planters. Wynne married Cecil Florence Collins on 26 April 1949. They had three sons – John, Peter and Stephen.

Descended from the Wynnes of Hazelwood House, Co. Sligo, Wynne once described his family as having been 'staunchly unionist'. In 1984 he said that the Protestant community in the Republic had only recently come to believe that it had a rightful place in the country. He described his father's fear when the republican de Valera came to power in 1932. 'He immediately put the furniture into storage and threatened to take off for England’. His father continued to live in Ireland until his death in 1945.

Wynne died on 17 January 2000. His funeral took place at St. Patrick's Cathedral, Dublin on 20 January. During his funeral address, Canon Cecil Hyland, Rector of Howth, said that the hallmark of Wynne's ministry was compassion – 'because he was "a man who struggled within himself", he was able to help others in their struggles'.
