= Owen Wynne (British Army officer) =

Irish general, commander and member of the Parliament of Ireland

Lieutenant-General Owen Wynne (1665–1737) was an Irish general and commander in the British Army, and a member of the Parliament of Ireland.

He was the third son of Owen Wynne, who settled in Ireland about the year 1658, having previously lived in Wales. In 1688 he was serving in the army of James II, but being a Protestant, he transferred his allegiance to the Prince of Orange on the breaking out of the Glorious Revolution. He was with Major-General Kirke's force sent from England to the relief of Londonderry, and he also took some part in the defence of Enniskillen, and served through the War in Ireland.

Owen Wynne was appointed a major in his brother James Wynne's Dragoons on 1 November 1694, and served with his Regiment through the Flanders campaign of 1694 to 1697, being promoted lieutenant-colonel in July 1695, taking the place of Charles Ross, promoted colonel of the regiment on the death of James Wynne. He served under John Churchill, 1st Duke of Marlborough and was promoted colonel in 1703, and in 1705 he raised and commanded a regiment of foot. The year 1706 saw him a brigadier-general, and in 1709 he was promoted to major-general.

In 1715 Major-General Wynne raised and commanded the regiment later known as the 9th Lancers. From the head of Owen Wynne's Dragoons, he was transferred to the colonelcy of the 5th Horse, later the 4th Dragoon Guards. Promotion to lieutenant-general followed in 1726, and in 1728 Owen Wynne was appointed Commander-in-Chief of the Royal Irish Army. In August 1732 he was transferred from the 5th Horse to the colonelcy of his old regiment, the Royal Irish Dragoons, which appointment he retained until his death in 1737.

Owen Wynne represented Ballyshannon in Parliament from 1715 to 1727, and from 1727 to 1737 was member for County Sligo. He was also a Privy Councillor, and in 1736 was Governor of Londonderry. It is stated that he several times refused a peerage.

Parliament of Ireland
Vacant Carrick was not represented in the Patriot Parliament	Member of Parliament for Carrick; 1692–1695; With: Roger Smith	Succeeded by Richard St George; John French
Preceded by Richard Warburton; Richard Geering	Member of Parliament for Ballyshannon; 1713–1727; With: John Rochfort	Succeeded by William Conolly; Thomas Pearson
Preceded by Joshua Cooper; William Ormsby	Member of Parliament for County Sligo; 1727–1737; With: Joshua Cooper	Succeeded by Joshua Cooper; James Wynne
Military offices
Preceded by Charles Ross	Lieutenant-Colonel of the Royal Dragoons of Ireland; 1695–1705	Succeeded by Robert Hunter
New regiment	Colonel of Wynne's Regiment of Dragoons; 1715–1719	Succeeded by James Crofts
Preceded by Sherrington Davenport	Colonel of Wynne's Regiment of Horse; 1719–1732	Succeeded by Thomas Pearce
Preceded by Charles Ross	Colonel of the Royal Dragoons of Ireland; 1732–1737	Succeeded by The Viscount Molesworth
Preceded by The Lord Barry of Santry	Governor of Londonderry; 1735?–1737	Succeeded by Thomas Pearce
