= Benjamin Burton (politician, born 1736) =

Irish politician (1736–1763)

Benjamin Burton (1736–1763) was an Irish politician. He was the eldest son of Benjamin Burton (1709–67).

Burton was born in Dublin and educated at Eton and Trinity College Dublin.

He represented County Sligo from 1757 until 1761, and Boyle from 1761 until his death, in 1763.
