= Clarence Goff =

Anglo-Irish landowner and politician (1867–1949)

Clarence Goff JP DL

High Sheriff of Roscommon
- In office 1891–1891
- Preceded by: Michael Joseph Balfe
- Succeeded by: Michael Burke

Personal details
- Born: Thomas Clarence Edward Goff; 28 May 1867 London, England
- Died: 13 March 1949 (aged 81)
- Party: Conservative
- Spouse: Lady Cecile Heathcote-Drummond-Willoughby (m. 1896)
- Relations: Lord Augustus FitzClarence (grandfather)
- Children: Elizabeth Moyra Goff; Thomas Robert Charles Goff
- Parent(s): Thomas William Goff; Dorothea FitzClarence
- Education: Eton College
- Alma mater: Christ Church, Oxford

Thomas Clarence Edward Goff JP DL (28 May 1867 – 13 March 1949) was an Anglo-Irish landowner, farmer, and politician who was a great-grandson of King William IV.

== Early life ==
Goff was born in London on 28 May 1867. He was the son of Thomas William Goff (1829–1876) and Dorothea (née FitzClarence) Goff (1845–1870). His mother died when Goff was only three. His father, a Member of Parliament for County Roscommon and a captain in the 7th Dragoon Guards, died when Goff was aged nine.

Goff's maternal grandparents were the Rev. Lord Augustus FitzClarence, an illegitimate son of King William IV, and Sarah Elizabeth Catharine Gordon, a granddaughter of George Gordon, 9th Marquess of Huntly. His paternal grandparents were the Reverend Thomas Goff and Anne (née Caulfeild) Goff, a granddaughter of the Ven. John Caulfeild, Archdeacon of Kilmore, a niece of Lt.-Gen. James Caulfeild, and a great-granddaughter of the 1st Earl of Glandore.

Goff was educated at Eton and Christ Church, Oxford. After leaving Oxford, "he travelled extensively abroad, both in Europe and America, and returned with a determination to devote himself to political life."

His elder sister was Ethel Anne Goff, who married Henry de Courcy Agnew, a son of Sir Andrew Agnew, 8th Baronet, of Lochnaw, and grandson of Charles Noel, 1st Earl of Gainsborough.

== Career ==
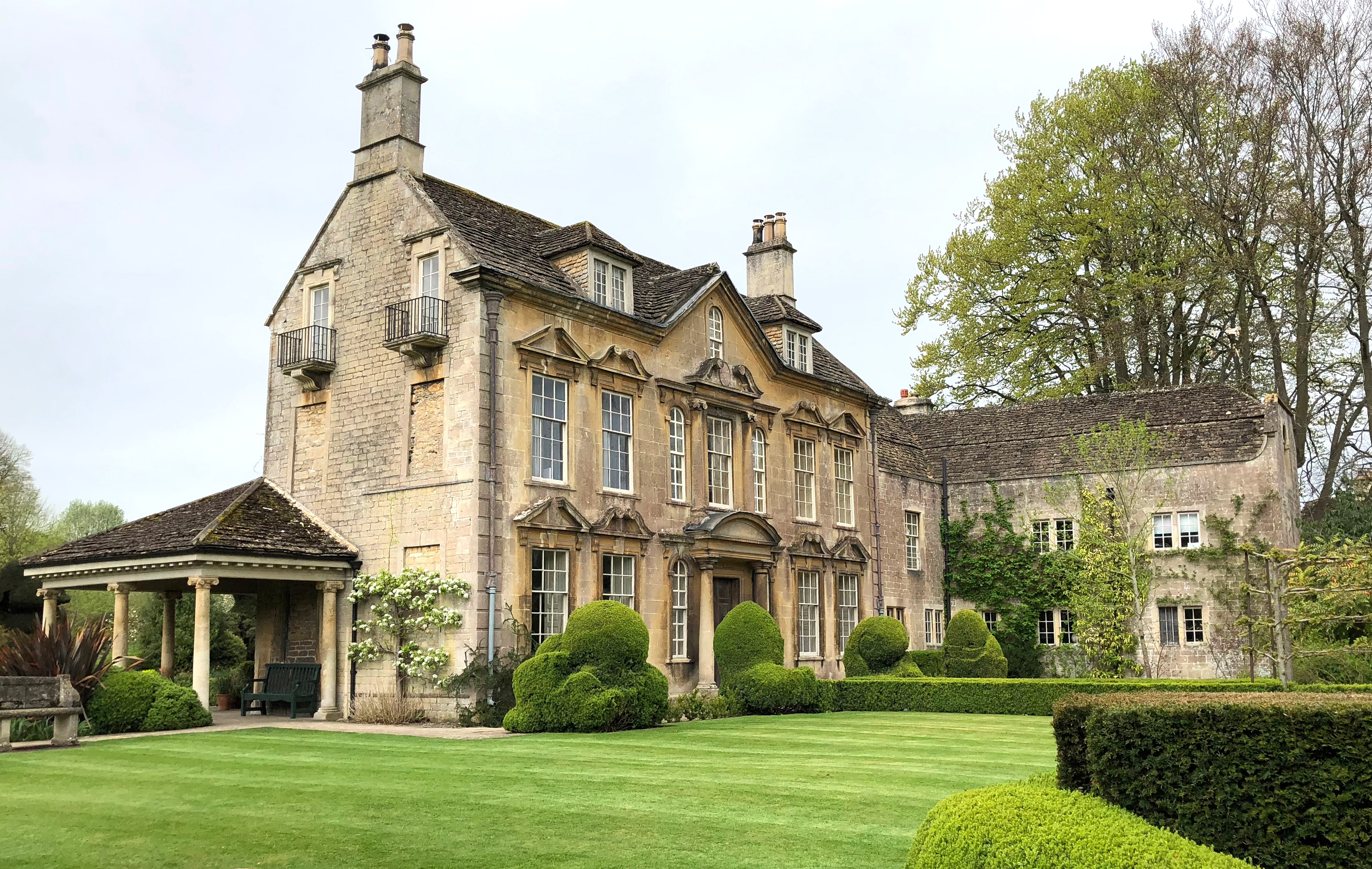
The Courts in Holt

Goff was a landowner in four Irish counties and farmed about 800 acres of his own land.

He was a Justice of the Peace, and High Sheriff of Roscommon in 1891 and was also a London County Councillor. In 1895, he was an unsuccessful Unionist candidate to represent Buckrose in Yorkshire in the House of Commons, losing to the Liberal candidate Angus Holden by a margin of 90 votes. In 1899, he was appointed a Deputy Lieutenant for County Roscommon.

In 1890, Goff was living at Carrowroe Park in Roscommon, Ireland, a substantial limestone country house with a Doric portico, which had been occupied by the Rev. William Battersby (who held the property from the Earl of Essex) in the 1850s. Battersby was married to Mary Maud Caulfeild, a daughter of the Ven. John Caulfeild and an aunt of Goff's grandmother Anne.

In 1921, towards the close of the Irish War of Independence, Goff purchased The Courts, an early Georgian house in Holt, Wiltshire, where the Goffs further developed the gardens, which had been laid out by Sir George Hastings in the early 1900s. The gardens feature an arboretum, working vegetable garden and orchard, a Sundial Lawn, and a folly temple. Queen Mary visited the Goffs at Holt. They gave the whole property to the National Trust in 1943, subject to a life tenancy for their daughter, Moyra Goff, who lived in the main house until her death in 1990.

=== Military service ===
Goff served in the British Army between 1915 and 1920, becoming captain in The Royal Scots (Lothian Regiment). During the Second World War, Goff commanded the Holt and Staverton Local Defence Volunteers.

== Personal life ==
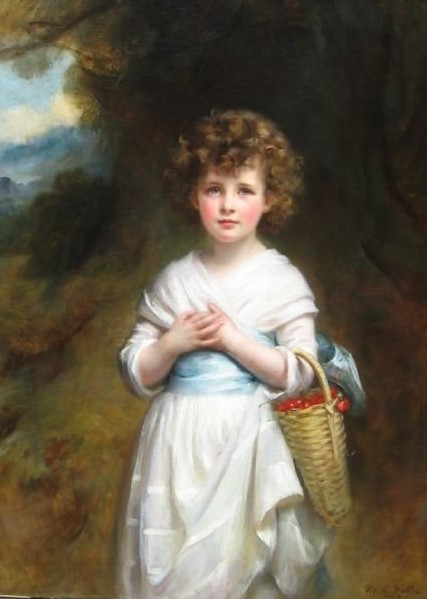
Portrait of Goff's daughter Elizabeth Moyra Goff by Mary Lemon Waller, 1902

On 15 April 1896, Goff married Lady Cecile Heathcote-Drummond-Willoughby (1874–1960), at St Paul's Church, Knightsbridge, with John Egerton, Viscount Brackley, eldest son of the Earl of Ellesmere, acting as his best man. The wedding reception was held at 12, Belgrave Square, the Ancaster residence in London. (Note: Their wedding reception was attended by Prince and Princess Adolphus of Teck, the Duke and Duchess of St Albans, the Duke and Duchess of Sutherland, the Duke and Duchess of Buccleuch, the Marquis and Marchioness of Huntly, the Earl and Countess of Lonsdale, Sir Henry and Lady Evelyn Ewert (Lady Cecile's sister and brother-in-law), Lady Tryon, Mr. and Lady Margaret Ormsby Gore, Lord and Lady Magheramorne, Lady Augustus FitzClarence (Goff's grandmother), Mr. and Lady Mary Turner, Miss FitzClarence (Goff's cousin), Mr. and Mrs. Henry Agnew (his sister and brother-in-law), Miss Muriel Goff (his sister), Mr. D. Goff, and Mr. and Mrs. C. Goff.) Lady Cecile was the fourth daughter of Gilbert Heathcote-Drummond-Willoughby, 1st Earl of Ancaster and Lady Evelyn Elizabeth Gordon, a daughter of Charles Gordon, 10th Marquess of Huntly. Their London residence was at 46 Pont Street in the Royal Borough of Kensington, and they were the parents of:

- (Elizabeth) Moyra Goff (1897–1990), who never married, travelled to America, and lived at The Courts until her death in 1990; she was the subject of a 1902 portrait by Mary Lemon Waller.
- Thomas Robert Charles Goff (1898–1975), who was educated at Eton and Christ Church, Oxford, and studied the piano with Irene Scharrer; he fought in the First World War and was admitted to the Middle Temple in 1922, from where he was called as a barrister. In 1933 he formed a partnership with J. C. Cobby, a master cabinet maker, to make clavichords, harpsichords and lutes. He served as aide-de-camp to the Governor General of Canada and in 1959 was appointed an Officer of the Order of the British Empire.

In 1899, Goff's wife Lady Cecile travelled to India. In 1930 her book A Woman of the Tudor Age, about her ancestress Katherine Brandon, Duchess of Suffolk, was published.

Goff died on 13 March 1949, and his widow on 27 July 1960.

== Arms ==
Coat of arms of Clarence Goff

Notes
Confirmed 7 January 1861 by Sir John Bernard Burke, Ulster King of Arms.
Crest
A squirrel sejant Proper charged on the shoulder with a fleur-de-lis Or and holding in its forepaws a nut also Proper.
Escutcheon
Azure on a chevron between two fleur de lis in chief and a demi-lion rampant couped in base Or an annulet Gules.
Motto
Honestas Optima Politia

Honorary titles
Preceded by Michael Joseph Balfe	High Sheriff of Roscommon; 1891–1891	Succeeded by Michael Burke
