= Dennis O'Connor =

Dennis O'Connor may refer to:

- Dennis O'Connor (judge), Associate Chief Justice of Ontario
- J. Dennis O'Connor (born 1942), Chancellor of the University of Pittsburgh
- Dennis James O'Connor (1886–1946), Quebec politician
- Dennis O'Connor, a Québécois actor known from such movies as The Park Is Mine and Self Defense, as well as some TV series.

== See also ==
- Denis O'Conor, Irish nobleman and politician
- Denis Charles Joseph O'Conor, Irish lawyer
- Denis Maurice O'Conor, Irish barrister and politician
- Denis O'Connor (disambiguation)
