= Thomas William Goff =

Irish politician (1829 - 1876)

Captain Thomas William Goff

Member of Parliament for County Roscommon
- In office 16 May 1859 – 5 March 1860 Serving with Fitzstephen French
- Preceded by: Fitzstephen French; Oliver Dowell John Grace
- Succeeded by: Fitzstephen French; Charles Owen O'Conor

Personal details
- Born: 6 July 1829
- Died: 3 June 1876 (aged 46) Haymarket, London
- Party: Conservative
- Spouse: Dorothea FitzClarence (m. 1863; died 1870)
- Children: 3, including Clarence
- Parent(s): Thomas Goff; Anne Caulfeild

Thomas William Goff (6 July 1829 – 3 June 1876) was an Irish Conservative politician.

== Early life ==
He was a son of the Reverend Thomas Goff and the former Anne Caulfeild. His paternal grandparents were Robert Goff and Sarah (née French) Goff and his maternal grandparents were Commodore Thomas Gordon Caulfeild (a son of the Ven. John Caulfeild and brother of Lt.-Gen. James Caulfeild) and Theodosia (née Talbot) Caulfield (a granddaughter of the 1st Earl of Glandore).

== Career ==
Goff gained the rank of Captain in the 7th Dragoon Guards and held the office of High Sheriff of Roscommon, in 1858.

Goff was elected Conservative MP for County Roscommon at the 1859 general election, but was unseated on petition in March the next year on the grounds of treating.

== Personal life ==
On 17 March 1863, Goff was married to Dorothea FitzClarence (1845–1870), a daughter of Sarah Elizabeth Catharine Gordon (a granddaughter of George Gordon, 9th Marquess of Huntly through Maj. Lord Henry Gordon) and Lord Augustus FitzClarence (an illegitimate son of William IV of the United Kingdom). Together, they lived at Oakport House in Roscommon, Ireland (inherited from his paternal grandmother's family), and were the parents of:

- Ethel Anne Goff (1864–1928), who married Henry de Courcy Agnew, a son of Sir Andrew Agnew, 8th Baronet of Lochnaw and Lady Mary Arabella Louisa Noel (a daughter of Charles Noel, 1st Earl of Gainsborough), in 1885. After his death, she married, secondly, Edmund Charrington in July 1911.
- Muriel Helen Goff (b. 1865)
- Thomas Clarence Edward Goff (1867–1949), who held the office of High Sheriff of Roscommon in 1891; he married Lady Cecile Heathcote-Drummond-Willoughby, a daughter of Gilbert Heathcote-Drummond-Willoughby, 1st Earl of Ancaster and Lady Evelyn Elizabeth Gordon (a daughter of Charles Gordon, 10th Marquess of Huntly), in 1896.

His wife died on 15 May 1870 at Brompton Crescent, Kensington. Goff died on 3 June 1876 at Rupert Street, Haymarket, London.

== Arms ==
Coat of arms of Thomas William Goff
Notes Confirmed 7 January 1861 by Sir John Bernard Burke, Ulster King of Arms. Crest A squirrel sejant Proper charged on the shoulder with a fleur-de-lis Or and holding in its forepaws a nut also Proper. Escutcheon Azure on a chevron between two fleur de lis in chief and a demi-lion rampant couped in base Or an annulet Gules. Motto Honestas Optima Politia

Parliament of the United Kingdom
Preceded by Fitzstephen French; Oliver Dowell John Grace	Member of Parliament for County Roscommon; 1859–1860; With: Fitzstephen French	Succeeded by Fitzstephen French; Charles Owen O'Conor
Honorary titles
Preceded by Daniel H. Irwin	High Sheriff of Roscommon; 1858	Succeeded by Patrick Hugh O'Conor
