= Denis O'Connor =

Denis O'Connor may refer to:

- Sir Denis O'Connor (British Army officer) (1907–1988), British general
- Sir Denis O'Connor (police officer) (born 1949), British police officer
- Denis O'Connor (bishop) (1841–1911), Roman Catholic Archbishop of Toronto
- Denis O'Connor (British-Irish sculptor), sculptor
- Denis O'Connor (New Zealand sculptor) (born 1947), New Zealand ceramicist, sculptor and writer

== See also ==
- Dennis O'Connor (disambiguation)
- Denis O'Conor, Irish nobleman and politician
- Denis Charles Joseph O'Conor (1869–1917), Irish lawyer
- Denis Maurice O'Conor (1840–1883), Irish politician
