= Charles French (politician) =

Charles French (21 October 1851 – 27 October 1925) was a politician in Ireland, serving as Member of the Parliament of the United Kingdom.

The eldest son of Charles French, 3rd Baron de Freyne by his wife Catherine Maree, French was born before his parents' marriage on 17 May 1854 and so was not eligible to succeed to the title of Baron de Freyne, which passed to his younger brother, Arthur, in 1868. He married Constance Eleanor Chichester on 21 January 1880.

French was elected to represent County Roscommon in a Parliamentary by-election, 24 June 1873, and held the seat until the 1880 general election.

He was High Sheriff of Roscommon in 1887.

Parliament of the United Kingdom
Preceded by Fitzstephen French; Charles Owen O'Conor	Member of Parliament for County Roscommon; 1873–1880; With: Charles Owen O'Conor 1873–1880	Succeeded by Andrew Commins; James Joseph O'Kelly
