= Arthur French, 1st Baron de Freyne =

Irish peer and politician (1786–1856)

Arthur French, 1st Baron de Freyne and de Freyne (1786 – 29 September 1856) was an Irish peer and member of parliament. The French family were of French descent and were previously named de Freyne.

De Freyne was the eldest son of Arthur French of Frenchpark and his wife Margaret Costello of Edmondstown. The French family had been major landowners in County Sligo and County Roscommon for many years. He was elected to Parliament for his father's old constituency of County Roscommon in 1821, a seat he held until 1832. In 1839 he was raised to the peerage as Baron de Freyne, of Artagh in the County of Roscommon, with remainder to heirs male. Twelve years later, in 1851, he was made Baron de Freyne, of Coolavin in the County of Sligo, with a special remainder to his three younger brothers John, Charles and Fitzstephen. He later served as Lord Lieutenant of County Roscommon from 1855 until his death the following year.

Lord de Freyne married Mary (d. 7 September 1843), daughter of Christopher McDermott, in 1818, but the marriage was childless. He died on 29 September 1856 when the barony of 1839 became extinct. However, he was succeeded in the barony of 1851 according to the special remainder by his younger brother, John.

== Arms ==
Coat of arms of Arthur French, 1st Baron de Freyne
Crest A dolphin embowed Proper. Escutcheon Ermine a chevron Sable. Supporters Dexter an ancient Irish warrior habited supporting with his dexter hand a battle-axe head downwards and bearing on his sinister arm a shield all Proper sinister a female figure Proper vested and scarf flowing Argent. Motto Malo Mori Quam Foedari (I Had Rather Die Than Be Disgraced)

== Sources ==
- Kidd, Charles, Williamson, David (editors). Debrett's Peerage and Baronetage (1990 edition). New York: St Martin's Press, 1990,
- Leigh Rayment's Peerage Pages
- Leigh Rayment's Historical List of MPs
- David Beamish's Peerage Page

Parliament of the United Kingdom
Preceded by Arthur French; Stephen Mahon	Member of Parliament for County Roscommon; 1821–1832; With: Stephen Mahon 1821–1826; Robert King 1826–1830; Owen O'Conor 1830–1831; Denis O'Conor 1831–1832	Succeeded by Denis O'Conor; Fitzstephen French
Honorary titles
Preceded by The Viscount Lorton	Lord Lieutenant of Roscommon; 1854–1856	Succeeded by Edward King Tenison
Peerage of the United Kingdom
New creation	Baron de Freyne (of Artagh); 1839–1856	Extinct
New creation	Baron de Freyne (of Coolavin); 1851–1856	Succeeded by John French
