= William Creek (priest) =

William Creek (1837–1899) was a 19th-century Anglican Archdeacon in Ireland.

Creek was educated at Trinity College, Dublin. and ordained in 1861. Creek spent his whole career at Kildallan: from 1860 to 1874 as Curate; and from 1874 as Incumbent. He was Archdeacon of Kilmore from 1884 until his death on 14 September 1899.
