= Matthew Handcock =

Matthew Handcock (1658-1740) was an 18th-century Anglican priest in Ireland.

The son of William Handcock, an MP in the Irish House of Commons, he educated at Trinity College, Dublin. He was Archdeacon of Kilmore from 1699 until his death.
