= Bosphorus (disambiguation) =

The Bosphorus or Bosporus is a major waterway in Istanbul, Turkey, that forms part of the Turkish Straits.

Bosphorus or Bosporus may also refer to:

== Places ==
- Boğaziçi (Istanbul), the neighborhoods surrounding the Bosphorus in Istanbul, Turkey
- The Bosporan Kingdom, an ancient Hellenic state
- Bosporus (see), the ancient Crimean city and Latin Catholic titular archbishopric
- Eastern Bosphorus, a strait in Russia
- Kerch Strait, Crimea, which was known as the Cimmerian Bosporus historically

== Other uses ==
- Boğaziçi University, an institute of higher education in Istanbul, Turkey, whose name means Bosphorus in Turkish
- Le Bosphore Égyptien, French newspaper published in Egypt between 1882 and 1894
