= 1873 County Roscommon by-election =

UK Parliamentary by-election

The 1873 County Roscommon by-election was fought on 24 June 1873. The by-election was fought due to the death of the incumbent MP of the Liberal Party, Fitzstephen French. It was won by the unopposed Liberal candidate Charles French.
