= Gus Kelly =

Irish cricketer (1877–1951)

Cricket information
- Batting: Right-handed
- Bowling: Right-arm fast

International information
- National side: Ireland

Career statistics
Competition	First-class
Matches	26
Runs scored	614
Batting average	16.59
100s/50s	0/1
Top score	52
Balls bowled	2567
Wickets	55
Bowling average	22.85
5 wickets in innings	2
10 wickets in match	0
Best bowling	5/32
Catches/stumpings	10/–
- Source: CricketArchive, 6 December 2022

Gustavus William Francis Blake Kelly (2 April 1877 – 16 August 1951) was an Irish cricketer. A right-handed batsman and a right-arm fast bowler, he played 18 times for the Ireland cricket team between 1895 and 1914 including nine first-class matches. He also played first-class cricket for Oxford University and the MCC.

== Early life ==
Born in Dublin, he first attended Clongowes Wood College, then a centre of excellence for cricket before boarding at the Oratory School, near Reading, Berkshire, where he was a key member of the Oratory XI. He lastly spent a short time at Stonyhurst College, Lancashire, before going up to Lincoln College, Oxford.

== Playing career ==
Kelly made his debut for Ireland against Surrey in August 1895. He played twice more for Ireland that month, including a match against the MCC at Lord's, but it would be six years before he again featured in high-level cricket.

He made his first-class debut playing for Oxford University against Surrey in May 1901. He played for the university against Somerset the following month, before returning to the Ireland side to play against South Africa. He played four more first-class matches for Oxford University that year, gaining his blue when he played against Cambridge University in July.

He played ten first-class matches for Oxford University in 1902, including a matches against his native Ireland and the touring Australian team, and returned to the Ireland team for a match against London County in June 1903. He played three more times for Ireland before he made his first-class debut for them against Yorkshire in May 1907. He also played for Ireland against South Africa that year.

His appearances for Ireland were sporadic over the rest of his career, playing against Philadelphia (twice) and Yorkshire in 1908, against Scotland in 1910 and 1911 before he played a first-class match for the MCC against Oxford University in June 1912. He played for Ireland against South Africa that year, and played twice more against Scotland before his career came to an end in July 1914.

== Statistics ==
In all matches for Ireland, Kelly scored 204 runs at an average of 8.87 with a top score of 30 against South Africa in June 1901. He took 41 wickets at an average of 17.12, with a best innings bowling performance of 5/42 against Scotland in July 1910, the only time he took five wickets in an innings for Ireland.

== Personal life ==
In 1900, he married Eily Mary Comyn, whose brother Dan Comyn was a splendid opening bat for Dublin University, Phoenix and Ireland. Two of their sons, Acheson and Gustavus, both played for Ireland.

He served as High Sheriff of Roscommon in 1920.
