= Gustavus Kelly =

Irish cricketer

Cricket information
- Batting: Right-handed
- Bowling: Right-arm fast-medium

International information
- National side: Ireland

Career statistics
Competition	First-class
Matches	7
Runs scored	275
Batting average	30.55
100s/50s	0/1
Top score	76*
Balls bowled	940
Wickets	17
Bowling average	23.35
5 wickets in innings	2
10 wickets in match	0
Best bowling	6/62
Catches/stumpings	5/0
- Source: CricketArchive, 6 December 2022

Gustavus Noel Blake Kelly (26 December 1901 – 14 March 1980) was an Irish cricketer. A right-handed batsman and a right-arm fast-medium bowler, he played six times for the Ireland cricket team between 1922 and 1926, including four first-class matches. He also played first-class cricket for Dublin University.

== Playing career ==
Kelly made his first-class debut playing for Dublin University against Essex in July 1922. Eight days later, he made his debut for Ireland, playing against Scotland in a first-class match. He played a second first-class match for Dublin University against Northamptonshire in June 1924, and also played for Ireland against Scotland and the MCC that year.

His final first-class match for Dublin University was against Northamptonshire in June 1926, before playing his final two matches for Ireland, against Wales and Scotland, which were also his final two first-class matches.

== Statistics ==
In all matches for Ireland, Kelly scored 176 runs at an average of 22.00, with a top score of 37 not out against the MCC in August 1924. He took 14 wickets at an average of 17.29, taking five wickets in an innings twice, the best of which was 6/62 against Wales in his penultimate game for Ireland.

== Relations ==
Kelly came from a cricketing family. His brother Achey and his father Gus both played for Ireland, as did his uncle Dan Comyn.
