= James O'Kelly (politician) =

Irish nationalist journalist and politician

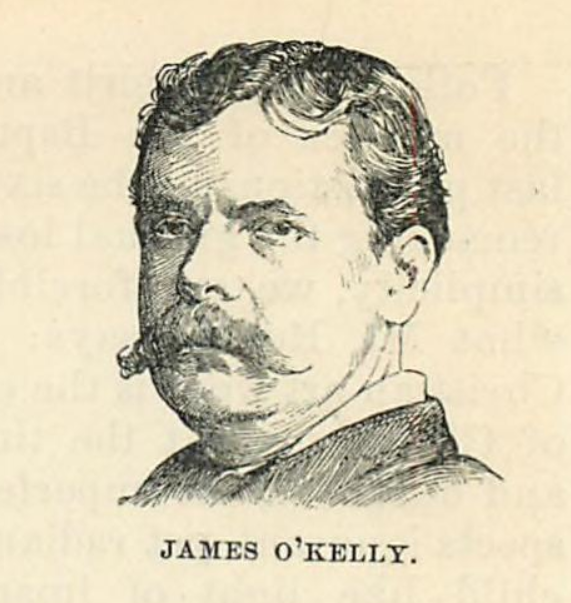
James O'Kelly, circa 1887

James Joseph O'Kelly (1845 – 22 December 1916) was an Irish nationalist journalist, politician and member of the House of Commons of the United Kingdom of Great Britain and Ireland and as member of the Irish Parliamentary Party represented the County Roscommon and North Roscommon constituencies between 1880 and 1916.

== Background ==
His grandparents on his father's side came from County Roscommon. His father, John O'Kelly, ran a blacksmith's shop and dray making business in Dublin's Peterson's Lane, which connects Townsend Street with City Quay. He also owned the Cumberland cottages off Westland Row. He was educated in Dublin. He was sent to London at a very early age to learn the craft of sculpting from his maternal uncle John Lawlor, however, on his father's insistence, he returned from London to take up an apprenticeship in the family business.

After his father's death in 1861, the Dublin properties were sold and the family moved to London. James returned to John Lawlor's studio where he worked for two years before departing to join the French Foreign Legion.

== Journeys ==
Kelly went with the French Foreign Legion to Mexico. Around 1865, O'Kelly deserted from the French Foreign Legion and escaped to Baltimore. Although he returned immediately to London, it was his first contact with America. He used the pseudonym Captain James Martin at the Home Rule conference in the Bilton Hotel. Having establishing himself as a journalist in London, he made a return visit to America to see John Devoy in 1871. He secured a position with the New York Herald as a journalist. In 1874, he released The Mambi-Land, or Adventures of a Herald Correspondent in Cuba (published by J. B. Lippincott & Co.). He was very successful with this paper and became Drama Critic and Art Editor. Aside from this occupation he dealt in paintings through the Goupil Gallery on Fifth Avenue. This episode of his career may have spanned the best part of twenty years. It is probable that the connections established there were instrumental in Aloysius O'Kelly's later move to America.

He attended the Home Rule conference in Dublin's Bilton Hotel, 19 May 1870, under the name Mr Martin. In August 1875 he was in Dublin for the Centennial celebrations for Daniel O'Connell and he interviewed John O'Connor Power for the New York Herald, prior to Power's tour of North America to promoted Home Rule. He was a close associate of John O'Connor Power and, in 1877, he persuaded John Devoy to take a positive approach to the Irish party's policy at Westminster. The following year O'Kelly arranged a meeting between Clan na Gael's William Carroll and Irish parliamentarians. This was flagged as a New Departure.

O'Kelly reported on the revolt in Cuba.

Escaping imprisonment by the Spanish in Cuba, Kelly joined the US troops in their campaign to eliminate the Sioux chief, Sitting Bull.

== Back in Ireland ==
In the 1880s he returned to Ireland, where he pursued an active political career. He was a member of the military council of the IRB. In the UK general election of 1880 he was elected Home Rule League MP for County Roscommon. In 1880, despite Parnell's opposition, he supported the Compensation for Disturbance Bill.

In October 1881, Charles Stewart Parnell, Member of Parliament and leader of the Irish Party, then at the height of his powers, was arrested and imprisoned in Kilmainham Gaol. Two days after his arrest, O'Kelly, along with some other Party members, including John Dillon and William O'Brien, were also imprisoned under the Coercion Act in Kilmainham where they remained until May 1882.

In December 1883, James O'Kelly travelled to Sudan with his brother, Aloysius, a war artist, to report (for the Daily News) on the River War, the Jihad of the famous Mahdi. He also published articles in Le Bosphore Égyptien, a French daily published in Cairo, Egypt.

O'Kelly won election to the new Roscommon North seat in the 1885 general election and was returned unopposed in the same seat in 1886. When the Irish Parliamentary Party split in 1890 over Parnell's leadership, O'Kelly supported Parnell. On hearing of the death of Parnell, he called at Walsingham Terrace, Brighton, where the Parnell family was staying, and offered his assistance. As a Pro-Parnellite he subsequently lost his seat to an Anti-Parnellite in the 1892 general election, but won re-election in Roscommon North in the 1895 election. He was then returned unopposed to the same seat in successive elections (1900, 1906, 1910) until his death in 1916.

He represented the Irish Independent newspaper in the British House of Commons in London.

His brother was the painter Aloysius O'Kelly.

Parliament of the United Kingdom
Preceded by Charles Owen O'Conor; Charles French	Member of Parliament for County Roscommon; 1880 – 1885; With: Andrew Commins	Constituency divided
New constituency	Member of Parliament for North Roscommon; 1885 – 1892	Succeeded by Matthias McDonnell Bodkin
Preceded by Matthias McDonnell Bodkin	Member of Parliament for North Roscommon; 1895–1916	Succeeded by George Noble Plunkett
