= Fitzstephen French =

Irish politician

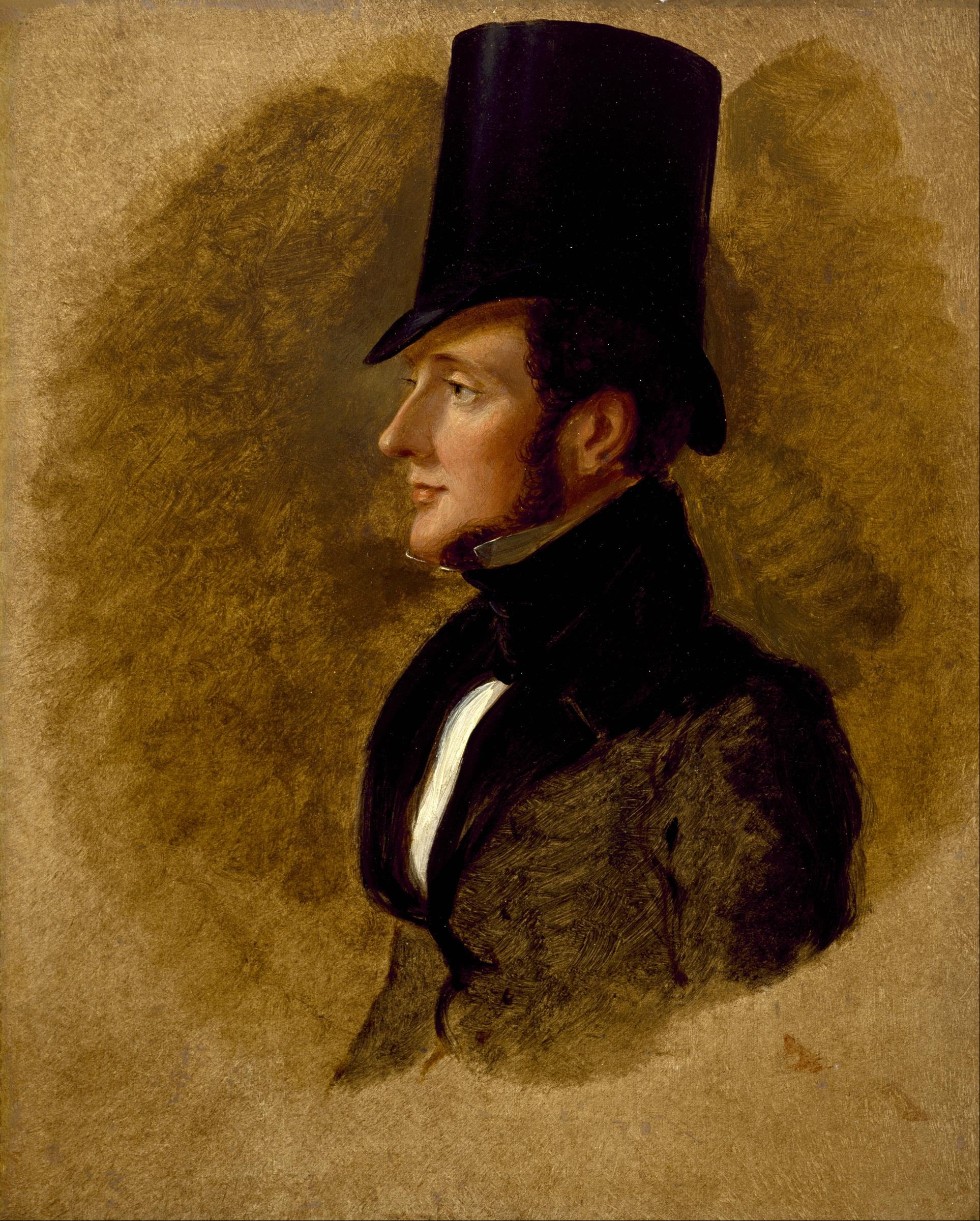
Portrait by George Hayter

Fitzstephen French PC (7 December 1801 – 4 June 1873) was a Whig Member of Parliament for County Roscommon. He was the younger brother of Captain Charles French, 3rd Baron De Freyne and a son of Arthur French. Elected in 1832, he held the seat up until his death aged 71 in 1873. He was resident in London for most of this time.

Parliament of the United Kingdom
Preceded by Arthur French; Denis O'Conor	Member of Parliament for County Roscommon; 1832 – 1873; With: Denis O'Conor 1832–1847; Oliver Dowell John Grace1847–1859; Thomas William Goff 1859–1860; Charles Owen O'Conor 1860–1873	Succeeded by Charles French; Charles Owen O'Conor
