= The Courts Garden =

National Trust property in Wiltshire, England

Coordinates: 51.3549°N 2.2009°W

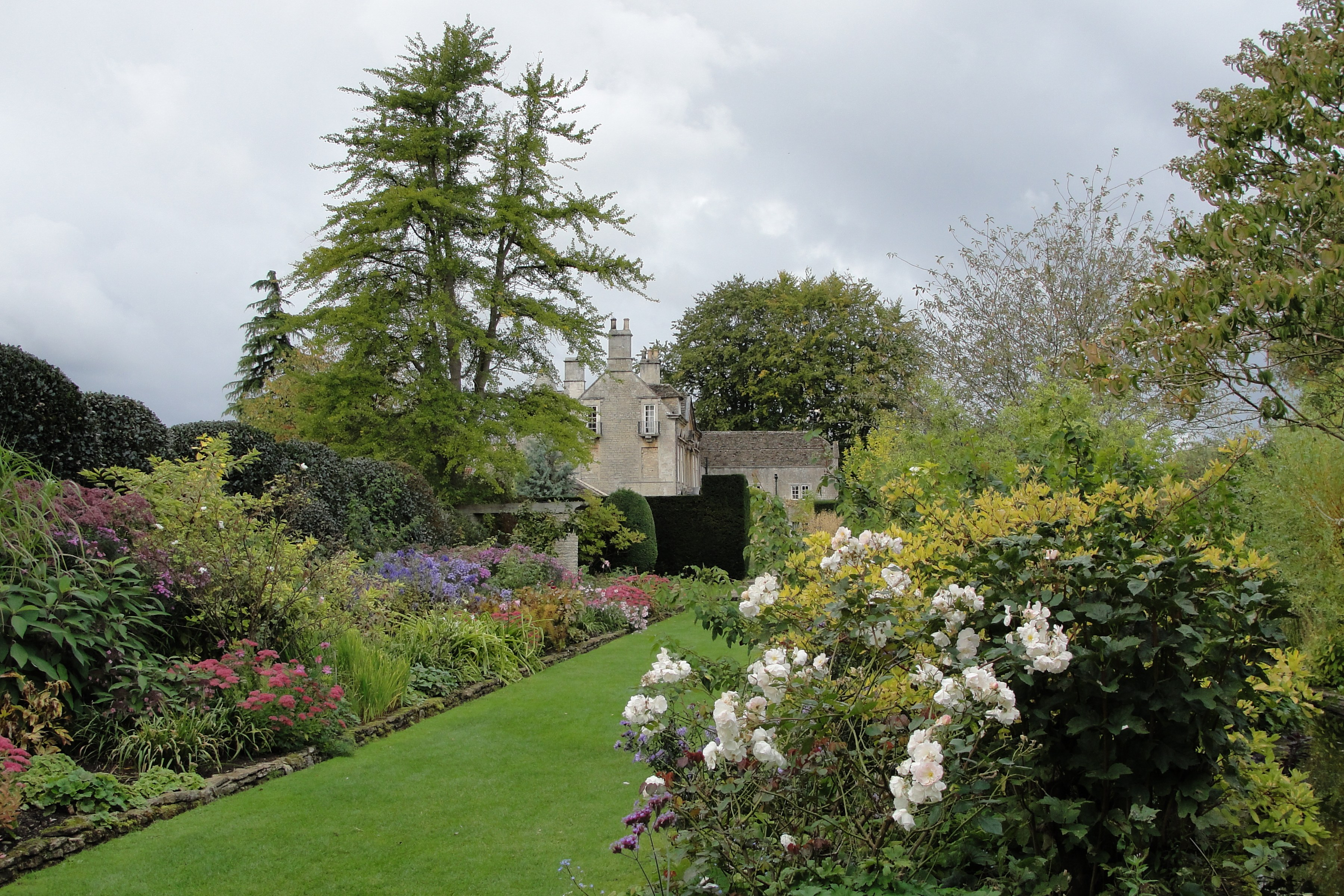
Temple Borders at The Courts Garden

The Courts Garden is an English country garden in Holt, near Trowbridge, Wiltshire, England. The garden has been in the ownership of the National Trust since 1943 and is Grade II listed.

== History ==
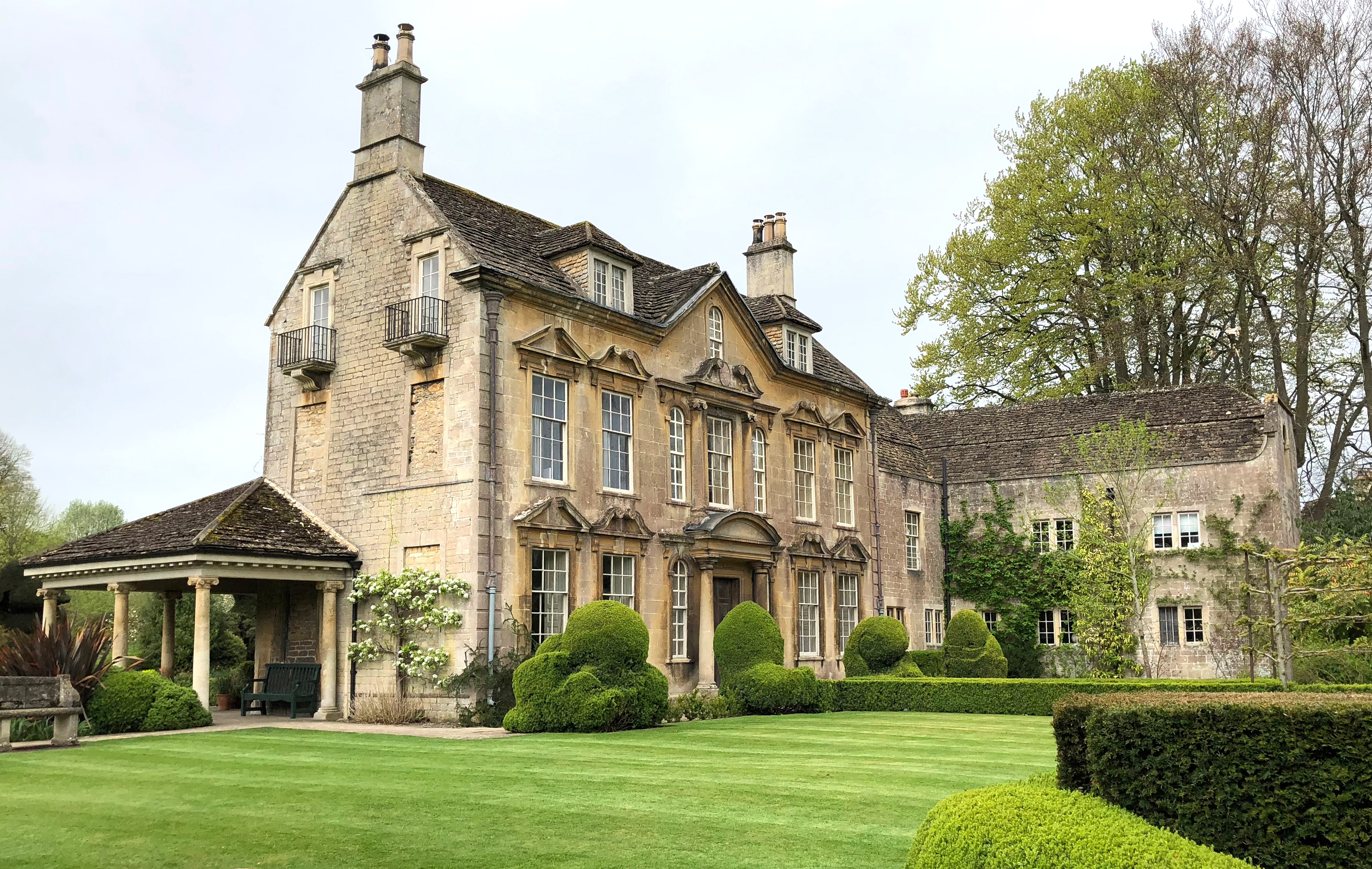
The Courts House

The house known as The Courts, which was built c. 1720 and incorporated earlier fabric, was the home of a wealthy clothier from nearby Bradford-on-Avon, at the time a prosperous wool town. The Courts served as the village law court where cloth weavers could settle their disputes. Around 1797, it was bought by John Davis and it remained in his family until 1900. Davis likely built the cloth mill which was next to the house. Following the decline of the wool trade in the area, his grandson demolished the mill around 1888.

In 1900, The Courts was bought by architect Sir George Hastings. He altered the house and laid out the garden which covered part of the site of the former mill, using the existing stream to create a water garden and various ponds and canals. In 1909, Hastings built a Georgian-style conservatory and introduced a collection of garden ornaments brought from Ranelagh House in Barnes, London.

In 1910, The Courts was bought by the Misses Barclay and Trim, and in 1921 by Major Thomas Clarence Edward Goff and his wife, Lady Cecile (a daughter of Gilbert Heathcote-Drummond-Willoughby, 1st Earl of Ancaster). Lady Cecile, strongly influenced by Gertrude Jekyll, was a keen gardener and she created various 'garden rooms' surrounded by clipped yews and box hedges, similar in style and layout to the contemporary gardens at Hidcote in Gloucestershire and Great Dixter in East Sussex. The gardens feature an arboretum, working vegetable garden and orchard, a Sundial Lawn, and a folly temple. While owned by the Goffs, Queen Mary visited the family at Holt.

The house was designated as Grade II* listed in 1962, and in 1987 the garden was listed at Grade II on the Register of Historic Parks and Gardens of Special Historic Interest.

=== National Trust ownership ===
The Goffs donated the whole property to the National Trust in 1943. Their daughter, Moyra Goff, retained a life tenancy and lived in the main house until her death in 1990.

== Gallery ==
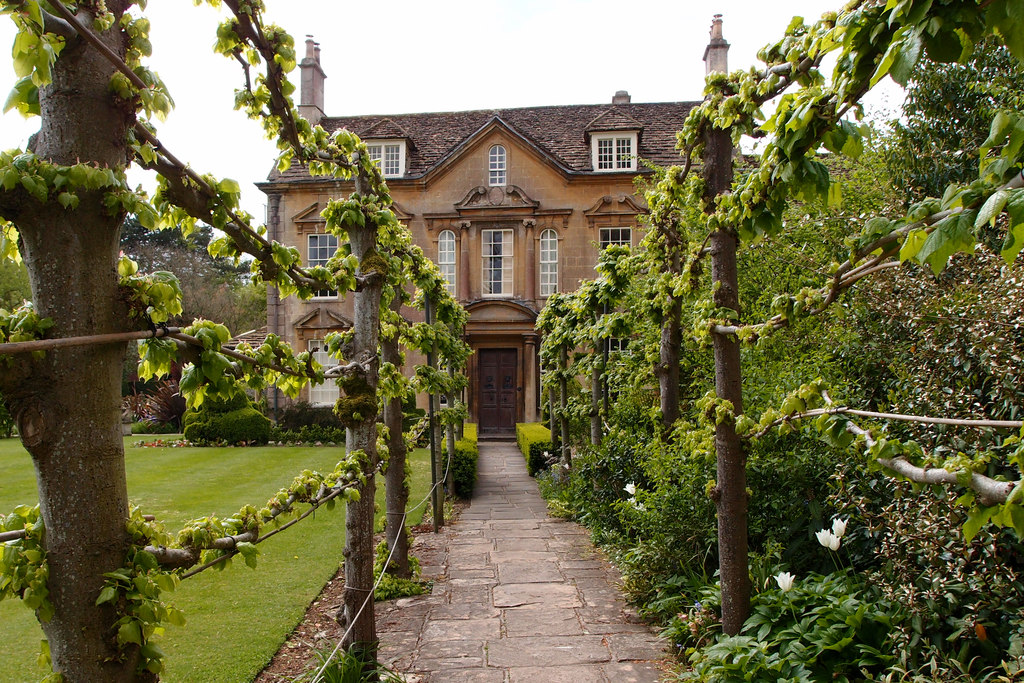
Entrance to The Courts Garden

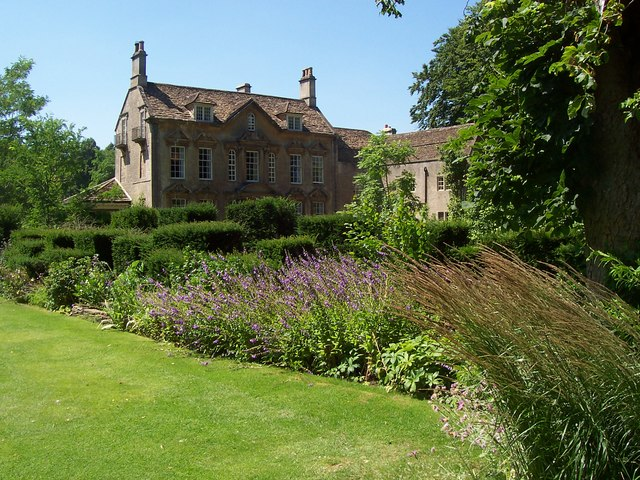
The Courts House from the Entrance Gate

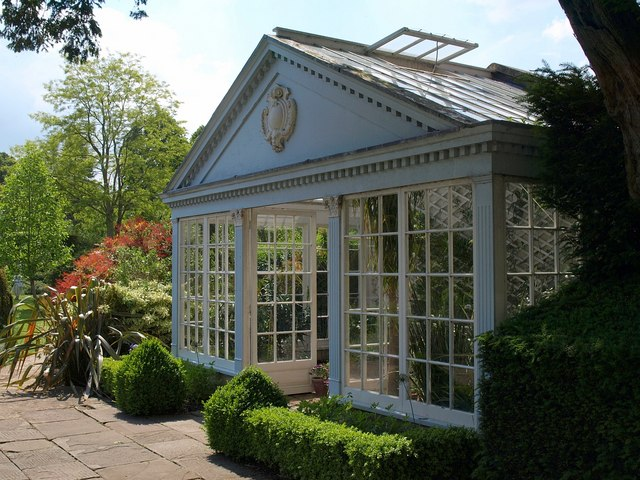
The greenhouse

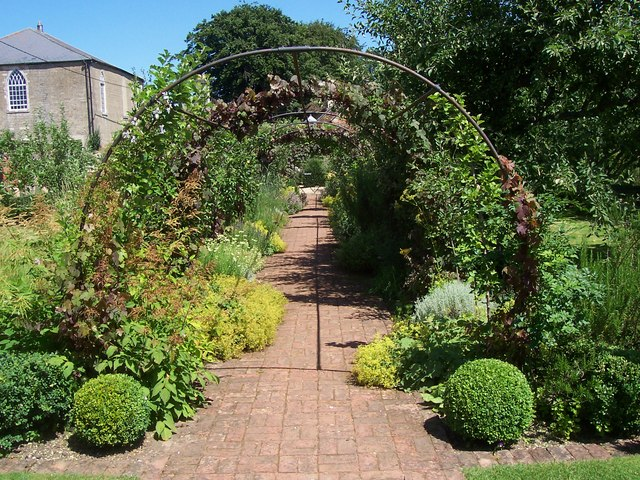
The kitchen gardens

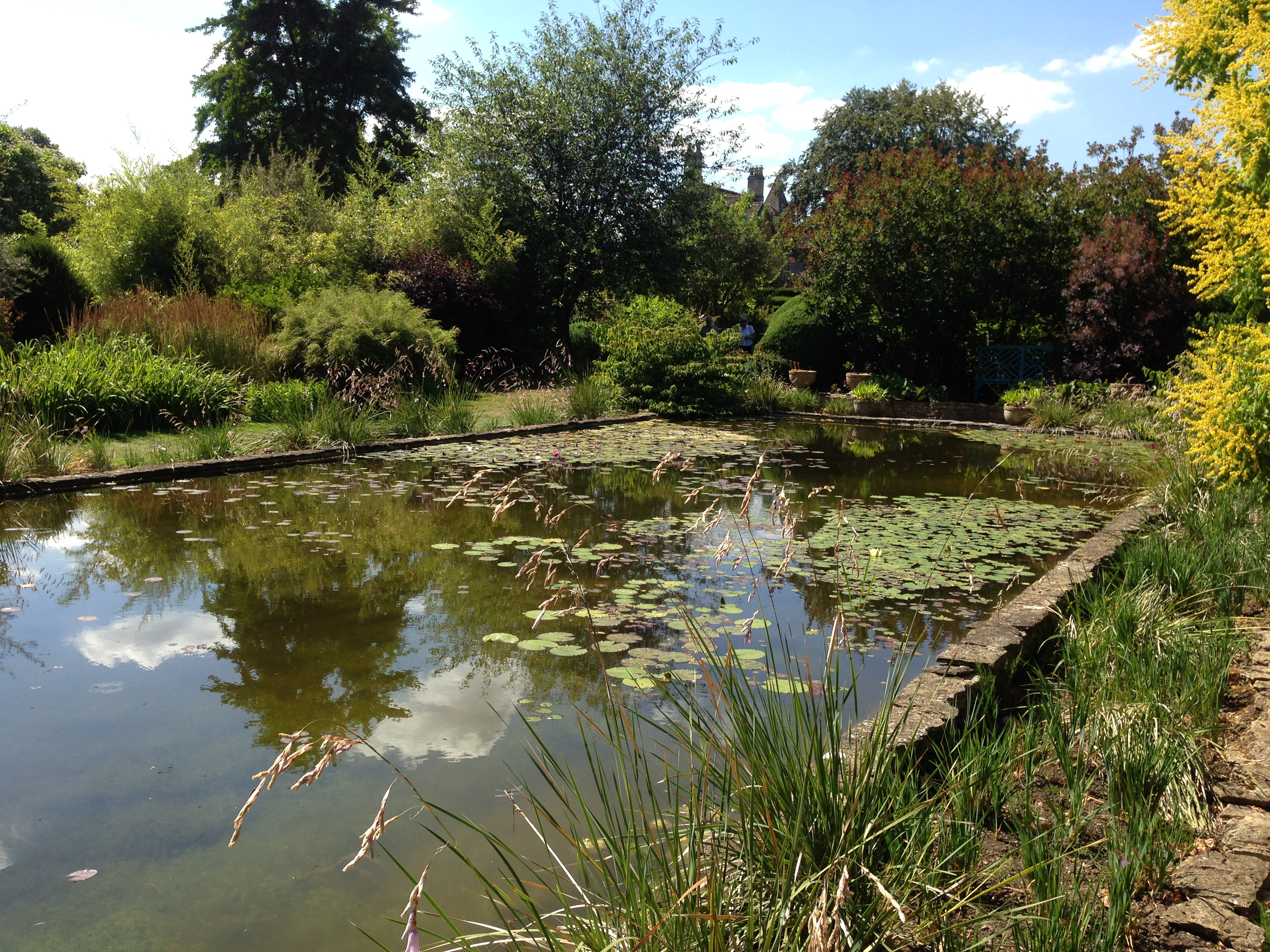
The Lily pond and dye pool

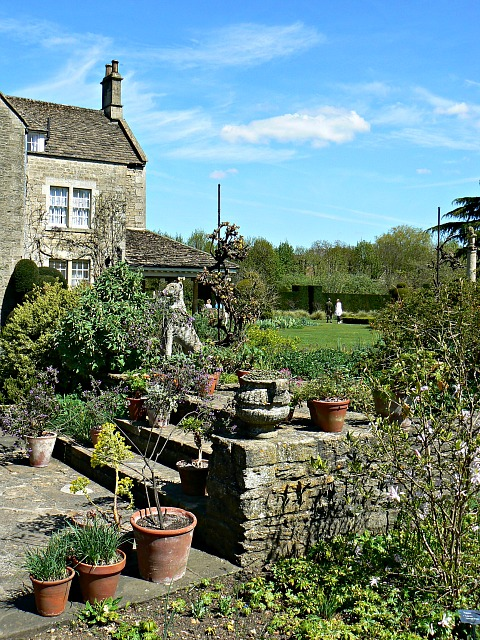
Steps and garden ornaments
