= Andrew Commins =

Irish lawyer and politician

Dr Andrew Commins (1829 – 7 January 1916) was an Irish lawyer and politician.

Andrew Commins was born in Ballybeg, County Carlow and educated at St. Patrick's College, Carlow and Queen's College, Cork where he was awarded an MA in 1854. In 1858, he was awarded an LLD degree from the University of London. He became a barrister at Lincoln's Inn in 1860, working on the Northern Circuit.

In 1876, he was elected as an Irish Home Rule Councillor to Liverpool Town Council to represent the Vauxhall ward which he continued to represent until 1892, when he was elected as an alderman, a post he continued to hold until his resignation in 1913.

In 1880, he was elected to parliament for County Roscommon representing the Home Rule League, then the Irish Parliamentary Party. From 1885 he sat for the new constituency of South Roscommon. In the Parnell split of 1891, he was a member of the majority Anti-Parnellite group, and in the general election of 1892 lost his seat to a Parnellite candidate. In a June 1893 by-election he was returned for South East Cork, and sat as MP for the constituency until the general election of 1900.

== Notes ==
Parliament of the United Kingdom
Preceded by Charles Owen O'Conor; Charles French	Member of Parliament for County Roscommon; 1880 – 1885; With: James Joseph O'Kelly	Constituency divided
New constituency	Member of Parliament for South Roscommon; 1885 – 1892	Succeeded by Luke Hayden
Preceded by John Morrogh	Member of Parliament for South East Cork; 1893 – 1900	Succeeded by Eugene Crean
