= The Mambi-Land, or Adventures of a Herald Correspondent in Cuba =

1874 historical book by James J. O'Kelly

The Mambi-Land, Or Adventures of a Herald Correspondent in Cuba
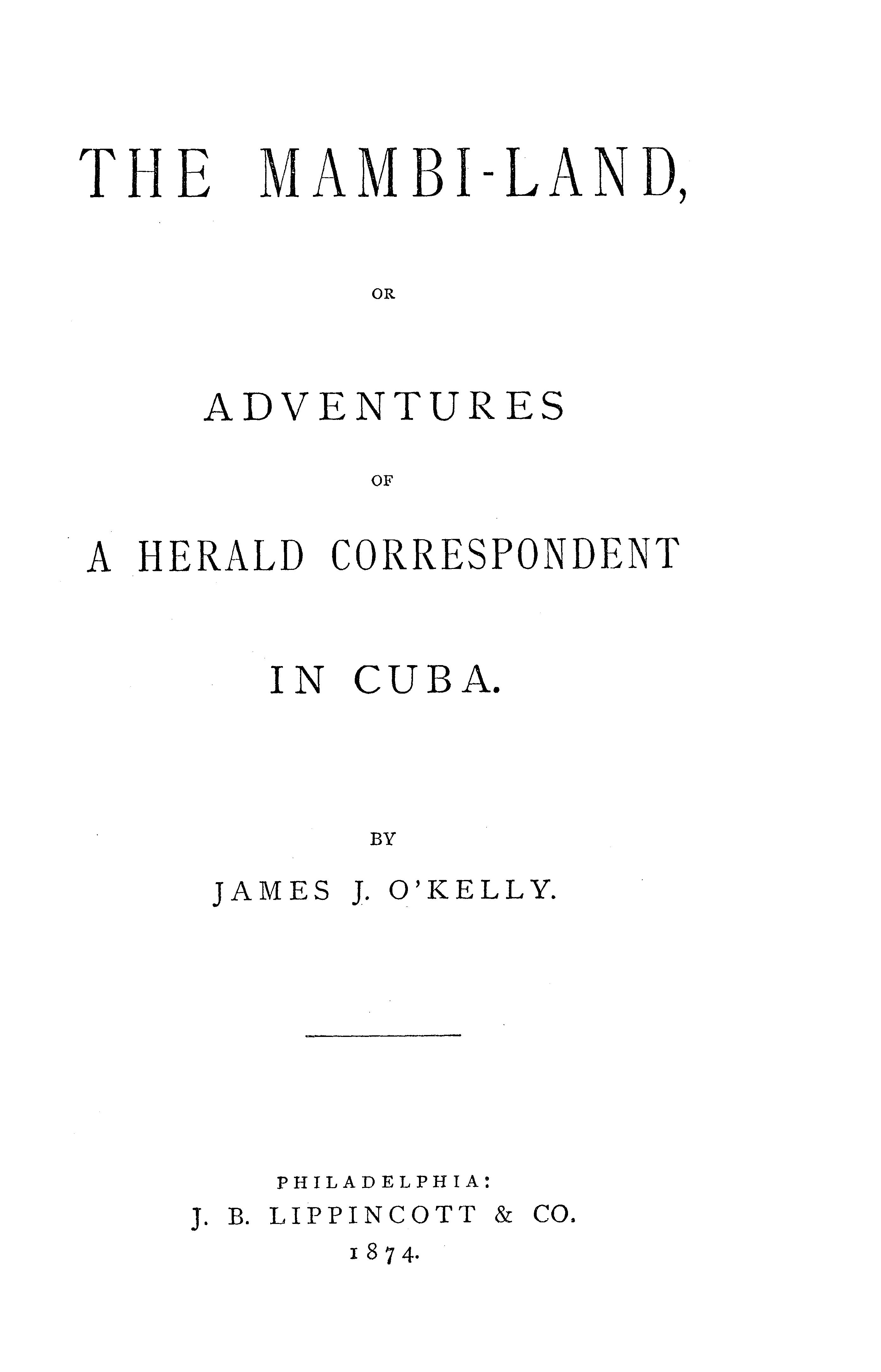
- Author: James Joseph O'Kelly
- Language: English
- Genre: History
- Publisher: J. B. Lippincott & Co.
- Publication date: 1874
- Publication place: United States
- Media type: Print (Hardcover, Paperback)
- Pages: 359
- OCLC: 2354228

The Mambi-Land, Or Adventures of a Herald Correspondent in Cuba is a historical book by James Joseph O'Kelly, published in 1874 by J. B. Lippincott & Co.

== History ==
The Mambi-Land, Or Adventures of a Herald Correspondent in Cuba is the first comprehensive account of Cuba's Ten Years' War and offers insight into the first war of independence against Spain spanning from 1868 to 1878. "Mambi-Land" refers to the territory controlled or significantly influenced by Cuban independence fighters, known as "mambises".

In late 1872, the New York Herald sent James J. O'Kelly, an Irish nationalist and journalist, as its special correspondent to cover the war, offering one of the few eyewitness accounts of the conflict.

Originally published in New Orleans in 1874, the Spanish language edition, introduced by Fernando Ortiz, was first released in Havana in 1930.
