= High Sheriff of Roscommon =

The High Sheriff of Roscommon was the British Crown's judicial representative in County Roscommon, Ireland, from 1575 until 1922, when the office was abolished in the new Free State and replaced by the office of Roscommon County Sheriff. The sheriff had judicial, electoral, ceremonial and administrative functions and executed High Court Writs. In 1908, an Order in Council made the Lord-Lieutenant the Sovereign's prime representative in a county and reduced the High Sheriff's precedence. However the sheriff retained his responsibilities for the preservation of law and order in the county. The usual procedure for appointing the sheriff from 1660 onwards was that three persons were nominated at the beginning of each year from the county and the Lord Lieutenant then appointed his choice as High Sheriff for the remainder of the year. Often the other nominees were appointed as under-sheriffs. Sometimes a sheriff did not fulfil his entire term through death or other event and another sheriff was then appointed for the remainder of the year. The dates given hereunder are the dates of appointment. All addresses are in County Roscommon unless stated otherwise.

== High Sheriffs of County Roscommon ==
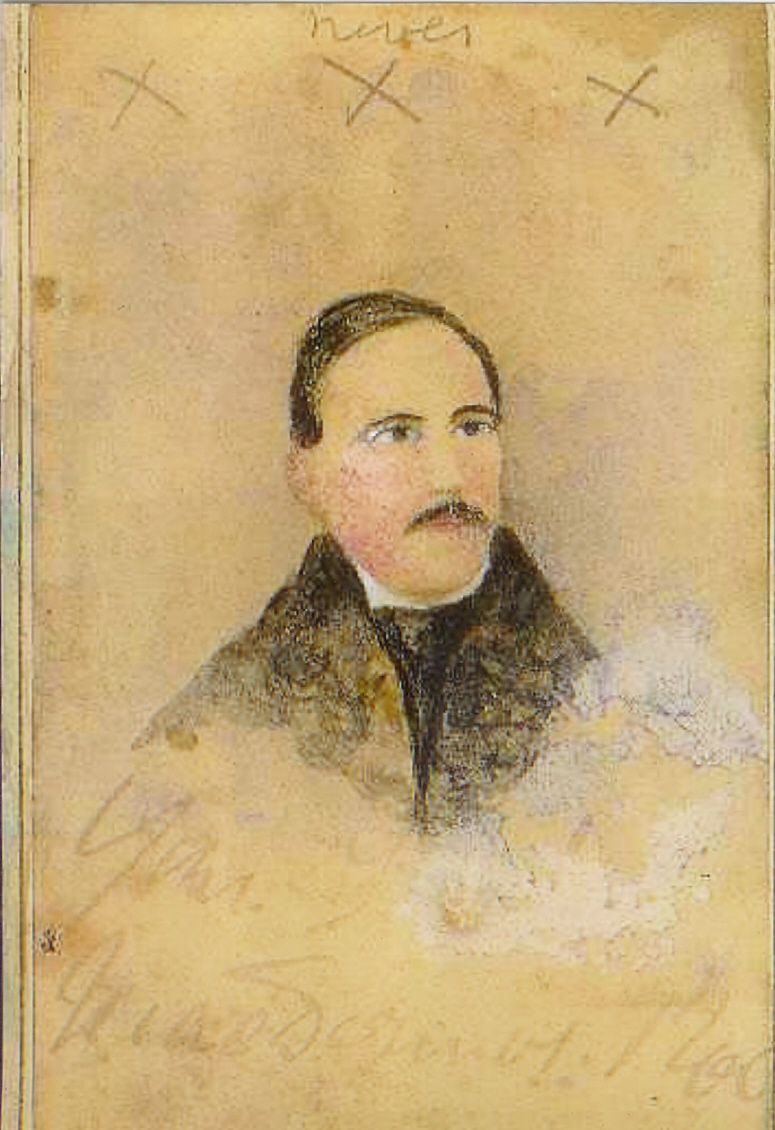
Thomas Charles MacDermot Roe of Alderford

- 1621: William O'Mulloy of Ughterthiera
- 1641: William O'Mulloy of Ughterthiera
- 1650: George Lane of Tulsk
- 1657: James King of Charlestown
- 1659: Owen Wynne
- 1664: Edmund Donelan of Cloghan
- 1665:
- 1679: Edmund Donelan of Cloghan
- 1680:
- 1683: Robert Sandys
- 1685: Robert Sandys
- 1692: Walter Pollard of Castlepollard
- 1693: Theobald Mulloy

== 18th century ==
- 1708: Caspar Wills of Willsgrove
- 1709: Sir Arthur Shaen, 2nd Baronet
- 1713: Henry Talbot
- 1714: William Lister of Athleague and Castle Coote
- 1715:
- 1718: Sir Arthur Shaen, 2nd Baronet
- 1719: Owen Lloyd
- 1721: James Lawder of Kilmore
- 1722: Arthur French
- 1723:
- 1731: James Irwin of Roxborough
- 1737: St. George Ussher St. George, 1st Baron St. George
- 1739: Thomas Lyster of Grange
- 1740:
- 1745: Thomas Lyster of Grange
- 1746:
- 1751: Owen Lloyd (son of Owen, HS 1719)
- 1753: William Talbot
- 1754:
- 1755: Godfrey Wills of Willsgrove
- 1760: Sir Marcus Lowther-Crofton, 1st Baronet of the Mote
- 1762: Thomas O'Naghten
- 1773: Sir Edward Crofton, 2nd Baronet of the Mote
- 1775: Owen Lloyd (son of Owen, HS 1751)
- 1779: Mathew Lyster
- 1780:
- 1782: Samuel Owens the Younger of Dundermot
- 1783: Thomas Mitchell the Younger, of Castlestrange
- 1784: Henry Moore Sandford of Castlerea
- 1785: Maurice Mahon of Strokestown
- 1786: John Yeadon Lloyd of Anneville
- 1788: Nehemiah Sandys of Sandfield
- 1790: Sir Richard Bligh Saint-George, 2nd Baronet
- 1791: Thomas Tenison of Castle Tenison (Kilronan Castle)
- 1792: Charles Birch
- 1793:
- 1795: Owen Young
- 1798: Oliver Mills of Knockall

== 19th century ==
- 1800: William Lloyd of Rockville
- 1801:
- 1804: William Caulfield
- 1805: St George Caulfield
- 1806: John Browne
- 1807: W. Robert Wells
- 1807: William Brudenell Murphy of Kilbrew
- 1808: Bartholomew Mahon
- 1809: Thomas Kirkwood (son of James)
- 1810: George Davys
- 1811: Henry Irwin
- 1812: Edward Mills
- 1813: Henry Irwin
- 1814: James Lyster
- 1815: Anthony Lyster
- 1816: George Mills
- 1817: Michael Griffin
- 1818: Owen Lloyd of Rockville (son of William, HS 1800)
- 1819: William Talbot
- 1820: Daniel O'Kelly
- 1821: Sir Robert King, 2nd Baronet
- 1822: Dennis H. Kelly
- 1823: Robert Goff
- 1824: Thomas Coury, of Strokestown
- 1825: William Lloyd, of Rockfield.
- 1826: John Caulfeild
- 1827: William Christopher St. George French of Cloonequin, Tulsk
- 1828:
- 1830: Henry Sandford Pakenham
- 1831: Oliver Dowell John Grace of Mantua
- 1832:
- 1833: Guy Lloyd of Croghan House
- 1834:
- 1835: Robert King, 6th Earl of Kingston of Rockingham
- 1836: Denis O'Conor of Mount Druid
- 1837: Edmund Mitchell of Castlestrange
- 1839: Roderic O'Connor of Milton
- 1840:
- 1842: Richard Irwin of Rathmill
- 1844: Thomas George Wills-Sandford of Willsgrove and Castlerea
- 1845: Garrett O'Moore of Cloghan Castle
- 1846:
- 1847: John Dowell Fitzgerald Grace of Mantua House
- 1848: James Kirkwood (son of Thomas,1808) of Hughestown, Carrick-on-Shannon.
- 1849: John Irwin, of Leabeg, Ballimore.
- 1850: Henry Sandford Packenham Mahon, of Strokestown House, Strokestown.
- 1851:
- 1852: Christopher French of Cloonyquin.
- 1853:
- 1854: Patrick O'Conor of Dundermott.
- 1855: Robert Edward King, 7th Earl of Kingston.
- 1856: Arthur O'Connor of Elphin House, Elphin
- 1857: John Talbot
- 1857: Arthur O'Conor of The Palace, Elphin.
- 1858: Daniel H. Irwin of Beechwood.
- 1858: Thomas William Goff of Oakport.
- 1860: Patrick Hugh O'Connor of Dundermott.
- 1861: Captain Patrick Joseph Balfe of South Park, Castlerea.
- 1862: John H. Dillon, Johnston, Athlone.
- 1863: Roderick Joseph O'Connor of Milton
- 1864: Richard Irwin
- 1865: Denis Maurice O'Conor
- 1866: Major Henry Taaffe-Ferrall, Moylurg House, Clogher.
- 1867: Guy Lloyd of Croghan House.
- 1870: Robert William Waithman of Moyne Park, County Galway.
- 1871:
- 1873: Thomas Yaden Lloyd Kirkwood.
- 1875: Thomas Charles MacDermott Roe of Alderford.
- 1875: Michael Joseph Balfe of South Park.
- 1877: Charles Mathew O'Conor of Mount Druid.
- 1878:
- 1880: John Christopher Murphy of Mullen.
- 1881: John Woulfe Flanagan of Rathfudagh.
- 1882: James Glancy.
- 1884: Charles Owen O'Conor of Belanagare and Clonalis
- 1886: William John Talbot of Mount Talbot.
- 1887: Charles French.
- 1889: William Lloyd of Rockville, Drumana.
- 1890: Michael Joseph Balfe of South Park.
- 1891: Thomas Clarence Edward Goff of Carrowroe Park.
- 1892: Michael Burke of Carrowroe Park.
- 1893: Edwin Hughes of Dalchoulin, Craigavad.
- 1895: Henry Packenham Mahon of Strokestown.
- 1896: Walter George Raleigh Chichester-Constable, of Runnamoat.
- 1898: Denis Charles Joseph O'Conor of Belanagare and Clonalis.
- 1899: Algernon Thomas St George Caulfeild of Donamon Castle.

== 20th century ==
- 1900: Stanley Victor Coote of Carrowroe Park.
- 1901: Edward Ferguson Bowen of Mantua.
- 1902: Arthur John St. George French of Cloonyquin.
- 1903:
- 1904: Edward Wills Sandford Wills of Cashlieve, Ballinlough.
- 1906: Thomas George Wills-Sandford.
- 1907: Sir Henry Christopher Grattan-Bellew, 3rd Baronet.
- 1908: Sir William Henry Mahon, Bt. of Castlegaar.
- 1909: William Hutchinson Lloyd.
- 1910: Patrick Fetherston.
- 1911: John Merrick Lloyd, of Croghan.
- 1912: Francis Charles French, 6th Baron de Freyne of Coolavin.
- 1913:
- 1914: Colonel James Nicholson Soden Kirkwood, Woodbrook House, Carrick on Shannon.
- 1915: William Joseph French.
- 1916:
- 1917: Rt. Hon. Sir Thomas Joseph Stafford, 1st Bt., of Rockingham.
- 1918: Owen Phelim O'Conor of Clonalis, Castlerea.
- 1919: Sir Capel Molyneux, 7th Bt.
- 1920: Gustavus William Francis Blake "Gus" Kelly.
