= Charles Owen O'Conor =

Irish politician, O'Conor Don

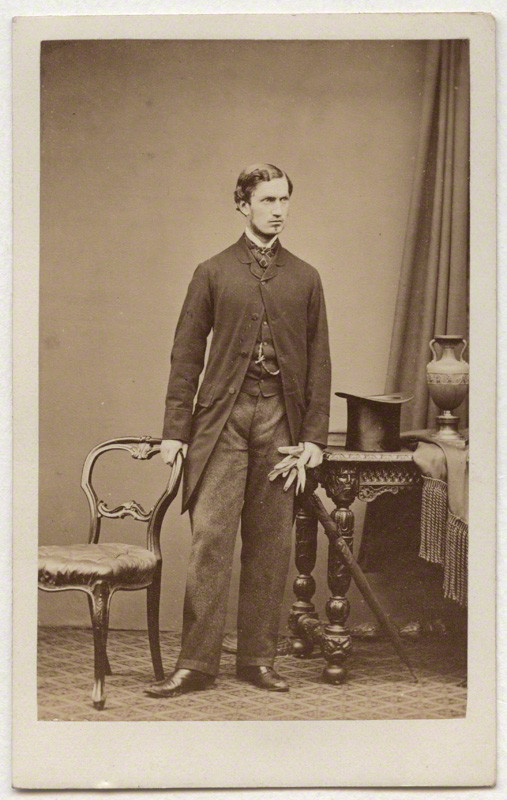
Portrait of O'Conor

Charles Owen O'Conor, O'Conor Don PC (Ire) (Irish: Cathal Eóghan Ó Conchubhair Donn; 7 May 1838 – 30 June 1906), was an Irish politician.

== Life ==
The eldest son of Denis O'Conor, he was educated at Downside School in England and became an Irish Liberal Party Member of Parliament (MP) for County Roscommon from March 1860 until he was defeated at the 1880 general election. He was an unsuccessful candidate for Wexford in 1883. He was appointed High Sheriff of Sligo for 1863 and High Sheriff of Roscommon for 1884.

He was also President of the Society for the Preserving the Irish Language, a precursor of the Gaelic League. He wrote a history of his family called "The O'Conors of Connacht".

== Personal life ==
He married on the 21 April 1868, Georgina Mary Perry, the daughter of Thomas Perry of Bitham House, Warwickshire, England, with whom he had four sons;

- Denis Charles Joseph O'Conor, O'Conor Don (b. 26 Oct 1869, d. 22 Feb 1917)
- Owen Phelim O'Conor, O'Conor Don (b. 10 Dec 1870, d. 1 Mar 1943)
- Charles Hugh O'Conor of Lucan house, Dublin (b. 24 Jan 1872, d. 28 Apr 1939); he was the father of Rev. Charles Denis Mary Joseph Anthony O'Conor, O'Conor Don SJ (b. 25 Mar 1906, d. 1981), on whose death in 1981, the title of O'Conor Don passed to Charles's Owen's great nephew Denis Armar O'Conor, O'Conor Don (b. 13 Jan 1912, d. 10 Jul 2000).
- Roderick Joseph O'Conor (b. 24 Jan 1872, d. 1878)

Georgina died on the 18 August 1872 and he married on 16 September 1879 to Ellen Letitia More-O'Ferrall, the daughter of Lewis More O'Ferrall, of Lissard House, Co. Longford.

He died on 30 June 1906 at age 68.

== Ancestry ==
Ancestors of Charles Owen O'Conor

8.Denis O'Conor of Bellanagare Castle
4.Owen O'Conor, O'Conor Don
9. Catherine Browne
2.Denis O'Conor, O'Conor Don
10. Edward Moore Esq of Mount Browne, Dublin
5. Jane Moore
11. Jane Reynolds
1. Charles Owen O'Conor, O'Conor Don
12. Isidore Blake Esq of Towerhill House, Co. Mayo
6. Major Maurice Blake of Towerhill house, Co. Roscommon
13. Frances Ruttledge
3. Mary Blake
14. Valentine O'Connor of Dublin
7. Maria O'Connor
15. Mary Moore

Parliament of the United Kingdom
Preceded by Fitzstephen French; Thomas William Goff	Member of Parliament for County Roscommon; 1860–1880; With: Fitzstephen French 1860–1873; Charles French 1873–1880	Succeeded by Andrew Commins; James Joseph O'Kelly
Honorary titles
Preceded by The Earl of Kingston	Lord Lieutenant of Roscommon; 1896–1906	Succeeded by The O'Conor Don
