= Craig McCauley =

Anglican priest

Craig William Leslie McCauley (born 1972) is an Anglican priest: He was Archdeacon of Kilmore from 2010 until 2023.

McCauley was born in 1972 and educated at Glamorgan University, All Hallows College, Trinity College Dublin and the Irish Bible Institute. He was ordained after a period of study at the Church of Ireland Theological College in 1999. His first posts were curacies at Seapatrick and Kill. After that he was the rector at Lurgan from 2004 until 2023, when he became incumbent at Naas.
