= John Caulfeild (priest) =

John Caulfeild (1738–1816) was an Anglican priest in Ireland in the second half of the 18th-century and the first decades of the 19th.

Caulfield was born in Inverness, the son of Colonel William Caulfeild, a nephew of William Caulfeild, 2nd Viscount Charlemont, and Catherine Moore. He was educated at Westminster and Christ Church, Oxford. He held livings at Castlerahan and Kilashee. He was Archdeacon of Kilmore from 1776 until 1810.

He married Euphemia Gordon and had 3 sons. One son was James Caulfeild (1782–1852), Army officer, Indian administrator, and MP.
