= Oliver Dowell John Grace =

Irish landowner and politician

Member of Parliament for County Roscommon
- In office 9 August 1847 – 16 May 1859 Serving with Fitzstephen French
- Preceded by: Fitzstephen French; Denis O'Conor
- Succeeded by: Fitzstephen French; Thomas William Goff

Personal details
- Born: 19 October 1791 Mantua, County Roscommon, Ireland
- Died: 25 January 1871 (aged 79) Mantua, County Roscommon, Ireland
- Party: Whig
- Other political affiliations: Independent Irish Party

Oliver Dowell John Grace (born 19 October 1791) was an Irish landowner and politician from County Roscommon, serving at various times as a magistrate, grand juror (1820s and 1830s), high sheriff (1831), and member of Parliament (MP) for County Roscommon from 1847 to 1859. Grace was elected as a Whig MP in 1847, briefly switching to the Independent Irish Party prior to reelection in 1852, before standing for reelection once more as a Whig in 1857. In 1867, Grace was appointed Vice Lieutenant of Roscommon, an office he held until his death.

== Early life and career ==
Grace distinguished himself from many of the absentee landed classes of the time through his deep Irish roots, Roman Catholic faith, and permanent residency at his Mantua estate. While sharing beliefs with the gentry on rights of property, his background led Grace to be an advocate for the native Irish, claiming to oppose any government that did not advance and promote Ireland's interests. Grace demonstrated these beliefs in 1832 by declining to join in the customary address of the clergy, nobility, gentry and landed proprietors to Lord Lorton, the largest landowner in Roscommon, upon his appointment as lord lieutenant of the county. Grace denounced the appointment, citing Lorton as an "enemy of reform", a view he claimed to share with the majority of landowners in the county.

Grace was an outspoken champion of tenant rights, aiming to better the conditions of tenants by providing a legal security to guarantee residency in the lands they live. His particular ties to the tenantry on his own estate were reflected in his later life through his funding of a new National School for Mantua in 1869, and his willingness to allow his house to serve as a chapel before the building of the local church in 1870. Grace's noteworthy care for his tenants are reflected in census figures around the period of Famine (1845–1852). Between 1841 and 1851, the population of Grace's estate declined by just 5.5%, considerably lower than the 37% decline in the surrounding areas. The population on his Mantua estate then recovered in the following decade, rising by 10.2%, while the surrounding population fell by 6.9%. Before his death, Grace demonstrated his generosity as a landlord by granting leases to all his tenants who applied for them. His funeral procession included 100 vehicles and 2000 people on foot, reflecting his popularity.

== Personal life ==
Grace is buried in the family mausoleum at Tulsk Abbey.

Grace had two children: John Dowell Fitzgerald Grace and Mary Clare. Mary later married Robert Archbold, MP for County Kildare. After the death of Archbold in 1855, Mary entered the Sisters of Mercy and, in 1868, founded a convent in Elphin.

Parliament of the United Kingdom
Preceded by Fitzstephen French; Denis O'Conor	Member of Parliament for County Roscommon; 1847–1859; With: Fitzstephen French	Succeeded by Fitzstephen French; Thomas William Goff
