= County Roscommon (UK Parliament constituency) =

UK parliamentary constituency in Ireland, 1801–1885

- Former county constituency for the House of Commons
- County: County Roscommon

1801–1885
- Seats: 2
- Created from: County Roscommon (IHC)
- Replaced by: North Roscommon and South Roscommon

County Roscommon was a UK Parliament constituency in Ireland. The constituency sent two MPs to Westminster from the Acts of Union 1800 until the constituency was split into North Roscommon and South Roscommon in 1885.

== Boundaries ==
This constituency comprised the whole of County Roscommon.

== Members of Parliament ==
| Year | 1st Member | 1st Party | 2nd Member | 2nd Party |
|---|---|---|---|---|
| 1801 | Arthur French (I) | | Thomas Mahon | |
| 1802 | Arthur French (I) | | Edward King | |
| 1806 | Arthur French (I) | | Stephen Mahon | |
| 1821 | Arthur French (II) | Whig | Stephen Mahon | |
| 1826 | Arthur French (II) | Whig | Robert King | Tory |
| 1830 | Arthur French (II) | Whig | Owen O'Conor | Whig |
| 1831 | Arthur French (II) | Whig | Denis O'Conor | Repeal Association |
| 1832 | Fitzstephen French | Whig | Denis O'Conor | Repeal Association |
| 1847 | Fitzstephen French | Whig | Oliver Dowell John Grace | Whig |
| 1852 | Fitzstephen French | Ind. Irish | Oliver Dowell John Grace | Ind. Irish |
| 1857 | Fitzstephen French | Whig | Oliver Dowell John Grace | Whig |
| 1859 | Fitzstephen French | Liberal | Thomas William Goff | Conservative |
| 1860 | Fitzstephen French | Liberal | Charles Owen O'Conor | Liberal |
| 1873 | Charles French | Liberal | Charles Owen O'Conor | Liberal |
| 1874 | Charles French | Home Rule League | Charles Owen O'Conor | Home Rule League |
| 1880 | Andrew Commins | Parnellite Home Rule League | James O'Kelly | Parnellite Home Rule League |
| 1885 | Constituency divided: see North Roscommon and South Roscommon | | | |

== Elections ==
=== Elections in the 1830s ===
General election 1830: Roscommon
| Party | Candidate | Votes | % |
|---|---|---|---|
| Whig | Arthur French | Unopposed | |
| Whig | Owen O'Conor | Unopposed | |
| Registered electors | | 629 | |
| Whig hold | | | |
| Whig gain from Tory | | | |

General election 1831: Roscommon
| Party | Candidate | Votes | % |
|---|---|---|---|
| Whig | Arthur French | 514 | 38.4 |
| Whig | Owen O'Conor | 479 | 35.8 |
| Tory | William Lloyd | 346 | 25.8 |
| Majority | | 133 | 10.0 |
| Turnout | | c. 670 | c. 91.8 |
| Registered electors | | 729 | |
| Whig hold | | | |
| Whig hold | | | |

O'Conor's death caused a by-election.

By-election, 25 July 1831: Roscommon
| Party | Candidate | Votes | % |
|---|---|---|---|
| Repeal | Denis O'Conor | Unopposed | |
| Repeal gain from Whig | | | |

General election 1832: Roscommon
| Party | Candidate | Votes | % |
|---|---|---|---|
| Whig | Fitzstephen French | Unopposed | |
| Repeal | Denis O'Conor | Unopposed | |
| Registered electors | | 1,776 | |
| Whig hold | | | |
| Repeal gain from Whig | | | |

General election 1835: Roscommon
| Party | Candidate | Votes | % |
|---|---|---|---|
| Whig | Fitzstephen French | 985 | 39.4 |
| Repeal (Whig) | Denis O'Conor | 955 | 38.2 |
| Conservative | Thomas Johnston Barton | 523 | 20.9 |
| Conservative | Arthur Browne | 40 | 1.6 |
| Turnout | | 1,453 | 78.0 |
| Registered electors | | 1,864 | |
| Majority | | 30 | 1.2 |
| Whig hold | | | |
| Majority | | 432 | 17.3 |
| Repeal hold | | | |

General election 1837: Roscommon
| Party | Candidate | Votes | % |
|---|---|---|---|
| Whig | Fitzstephen French | Unopposed | |
| Repeal (Whig) | Denis O'Conor | Unopposed | |
| Registered electors | | 2,070 | |
| Whig hold | | | |
| Repeal hold | | | |

=== Elections in the 1840s ===
General election 1841: Roscommon
| Party | Candidate | Votes | % | ±% |
|---|---|---|---|---|
| Whig | Fitzstephen French | Unopposed | | |
| Repeal | Denis O'Conor | Unopposed | | |
| Registered electors | | 1,059 | | |
| Whig hold | | | | |
| Repeal hold | | | | |

O'Conor was appointed a Lord Commissioner of the Treasury, requiring a by-election.

By-election, 21 July 1846: Roscommon
| Party | Candidate | Votes | % | ±% |
|---|---|---|---|---|
| Repeal | Denis O'Conor | Unopposed | | |
| Repeal hold | | | | |

General election 1847: Roscommon
| Party | Candidate | Votes | % | ±% |
|---|---|---|---|---|
| Whig | Fitzstephen French | 205 | 41.8 | N/A |
| Whig | Oliver Dowell John Grace | 170 | 34.7 | N/A |
| Repeal | Valentine O'Connor Blake | 115 | 23.5 | N/A |
| Majority | | 55 | 11.2 | N/A |
| Turnout | | 245 (est) | 18.3 (est) | N/A |
| Registered electors | | 1,341 | | |
| Whig hold | | Swing | N/A | |
| Whig gain from Repeal | | Swing | N/A | |

=== Elections in the 1850s ===
General election 1852: Roscommon
| Party | Candidate | Votes | % | ±% |
|---|---|---|---|---|
| Independent Irish | Fitzstephen French | Unopposed | | |
| Independent Irish | Oliver Dowell John Grace | Unopposed | | |
| Registered electors | | 2,236 | | |
| Independent Irish gain from Whig | | | | |
| Independent Irish gain from Whig | | | | |

General election 1857: Roscommon
| Party | Candidate | Votes | % | ±% |
|---|---|---|---|---|
| Whig | Fitzstephen French | Unopposed | | |
| Whig | Oliver Dowell John Grace | Unopposed | | |
| Registered electors | | 2,890 | | |
| Whig gain from Independent Irish | | | | |
| Whig gain from Independent Irish | | | | |

General election 1859: Roscommon
| Party | Candidate | Votes | % | ±% |
|---|---|---|---|---|
| Liberal | Fitzstephen French | 1,930 | 40.6 | N/A |
| Conservative | Thomas William Goff | 1,541 | 32.4 | New |
| Liberal | Edward King-Tenison | 1,280 | 26.9 | N/A |
| Liberal | Patrick Dignan | 3 | 0.0 | N/A |
| Turnout | | 2,377 (est) | 71.1 (est) | N/A |
| Registered electors | | 3,345 | | |
| Majority | | 389 | 8.2 | N/A |
| Liberal hold | | Swing | N/A | |
| Majority | | 261 | 5.5 | N/A |
| Conservative gain from Liberal | | Swing | N/A | |

=== Elections in the 1860s ===
On petition, Goff was unseated and a by-election was called.

By-election, 26 March 1860: Roscommon
| Party | Candidate | Votes | % | ±% |
|---|---|---|---|---|
| Liberal | Charles Owen O'Conor | Unopposed | | |
| Liberal gain from Conservative | | | | |

General election 1865: Roscommon
| Party | Candidate | Votes | % | ±% |
|---|---|---|---|---|
| Liberal | Fitzstephen French | Unopposed | | |
| Liberal | Charles Owen O'Conor | Unopposed | | |
| Registered electors | | 3,650 | | |
| Liberal hold | | | | |
| Liberal gain from Conservative | | | | |

General election 1868: Roscommon
| Party | Candidate | Votes | % | ±% |
|---|---|---|---|---|
| Liberal | Fitzstephen French | Unopposed | | |
| Liberal | Charles Owen O'Conor | Unopposed | | |
| Registered electors | | 3,814 | | |
| Liberal hold | | | | |
| Liberal hold | | | | |

=== Elections in the 1870s ===
French's death caused a by-election

By-election, 24 Jun 1873: Roscommon
| Party | Candidate | Votes | % | ±% |
|---|---|---|---|---|
| Liberal | Charles French | Unopposed | | |
| Registered electors | | 3,809 | | |
| Liberal hold | | | | |

General election 1874: Roscommon
| Party | Candidate | Votes | % | ±% |
|---|---|---|---|---|
| Home Rule | Charles Owen O'Conor | Unopposed | | |
| Home Rule | Charles French | Unopposed | | |
| Registered electors | | 3,710 | | |
| Home Rule gain from Liberal | | | | |
| Home Rule gain from Liberal | | | | |

=== Elections in the 1880s ===
General election 1880: Roscommon
| Party | Candidate | Votes | % | ±% |
|---|---|---|---|---|
| Parnellite Home Rule League | Andrew Commins | 1,585 | 31.1 | N/A |
| Parnellite Home Rule League | James Joseph O'Kelly | 1,479 | 29.0 | N/A |
| Home Rule | Charles Owen O'Conor | 1,107 | 21.7 | N/A |
| Home Rule | Thomas Austin Patrick Mapother | 933 | 18.3 | N/A |
| Majority | | 372 | 7.3 | N/A |
| Turnout | | 2,552 (est) | 70.8 (est) | N/A |
| Registered electors | | 3,602 | | |
| Home Rule hold | | Swing | N/A | |
| Home Rule hold | | Swing | N/A | |

== See also ==
- Roscommon (Dáil constituency)
