= James Caulfeild (East India Company officer) =

Irish British Army soldier and political officer

Lieutenant-General James Caulfeild (30 January 1782 – 4 November 1852) was an Irish British Army soldier and political officer in British India, and a Liberal party politician.

== Background ==
Caulfeild was the son of the Venerable John Caulfeild, Archdeacon of Kilmore, County Cavan, grandson of the Hon. Toby Caulfeild, younger son of William Caulfeild, 1st Viscount Charlemont. His mother was Euphemia (née Gordon).

== Military and political career ==
Caulfeild joined the Bengal Army of the East India Company as a Cadet in 1798 and arrived in India on 10 September 1799. He was commissioned as a Cornet 13 June 1800 and appointed to the 5th Native Cavalry in June 1801. Promoted Lieutenant 11 March 1805, he was absent on sick furlough from 15 September 1807 to 21 January 1812. Back in India he served with the Governor General's Bodyguard 1812–14. In 1817-18 he served with the 5th Native Cavalry in the Third Anglo-Maratha War and against the Pindaris, during which he was promoted Brevet Captain and appointed brigade major to the Nagpur Subsidiary Force.

In 1819 Caulfeild was appointed 1st assistant to the British Resident at Indore, after which his career was in the East India Company's Political Service. He was Political Agent in Haraoti (the territories of Bundi and Kotah in the Rajputana Agency) 1822–32, then Superintendent to the Mysore Princes in 1836, before being appointed Resident at Lucknow in 1839. Meanwhile, his military career progressed through seniority: regimental Captain 1818, Major 1823, Lieutenant-Colonel 1829, Brevet Colonel 1834. He was awarded a CB in 1831. He published Observations on our Indian Administration, Civil and Military (Calcutta, 1831).

Caulfeild left India on furlough in 1841, and never returned. Promoted to major-general in 1841 and lieutenant-general in 1851, he was a Director of the East India Company 1848–51 and stood for Parliament, unsuccessfully contesting the seat of Abingdon in 1845 and 1847 before finally winning it in July 1852. Caulfeild's career as a Member of Parliament was short, however, because he died at Copsewood, Pallaskenry, County Limerick, 4 November 1852.

== Family ==
Caufeild married Letitia, daughter of Lt-Gen Hugh Stafford, at Cawnpore on 6 December 1814. She died 26 August 1826. Their son, James Gordon Caulfeild, was born at Cawnpore 18 May 1815 and also served in the Bengal Army (Cadet 1832, Ensign 1835, Lieutenant 1838). At the time of his death at Madeira (21 September 1844) he was a lieutenant in the 68th Bengal Native Infantry.

Caufeild was married a second time to Anne Rachel, daughter of the late Major William Blake of the 13th Bengal Native Infantry. She died in 1890. Their son George Caulfeild of Copsewood (1841–1922) served in the Rifle Brigade and was High Sheriff of Limerick. Lieutenant-General Caulfeild had two further sons by his second marriage.

Parliament of the United Kingdom
| Preceded by Sir Frederic Thesiger | Member of Parliament for Abingdon; 1852 | Succeeded by Lord Norreys |
