= Le Bosphore Égyptien =

French daily newspaper in Egypt (1882–1894)

- Type: Daily newspaper
- Founder(s): Octave Borelli
- Editor-in-chief: Octave Borelli
- Founded: 1878
- Political alignment: Pro-French
- Language: French
- Ceased publication: 1894
- Headquarters: Port Said; Cairo
- Country: Kingdom of Egypt

Le Bosphore Égyptien was a French-language daily newspaper published in Egypt between 1878 and 1894. The paper is known for its opposition against the British rule in Egypt and its support for the French interests in the region. However, the political stance of the paper changed over time in favor of the British rule. It described itself as a political, literary and news publication.

== History and profile ==
Le Bosphore Égyptien was launched in Port Said in 1878. Its founder and editor was a lawyer, Octave Borelli, and its directors were Giraud and Emile Barrière. The headquarters of the paper was moved to Cairo, and it began to be published daily.

Arthur Rimbaud published articles about his visit to Africa in the paper. Another contributor was James O’Kelly, an Irish journalist and politician. O’Kelly advocated the nationalist Irish-Egyptian interests in his writings. Through its links to O’Kelly the paper became one of the media outlets which were often quoted by the Irish press. In turn, Le Bosphore Égyptien frequently made references to the Irish resistance to British rule to provide a model for the resistance to British rule in Egypt.

Le Bosphore Égyptien was subject to temporary bans due to its pro-French and anti-British stance. For instance, it was closed by the authorities in April 1885. It resumed publication soon after the Egyptian Foreign Affairs Minister Nubar Pasha expressed the regret of the Egyptian government about its closure to the French charge d'agent in Cairo.

Later Le Bosphore Égyptien began to support the British rule in Egypt and welcomed the appointment of Eldon Gorst as councillor in the Ministry of Interior in 1894. The same year Le Bosphore Égyptien stopped publication.
