= Denis Charles Joseph O'Conor =

Irish lawyer and hereditary Chief of the Name O'Conor

Denis Charles Joseph O'Conor, O'Conor Don (26 October 1869 – 22 February 1917) was an Irish lawyer and hereditary Chief of the Name O'Conor.

O'Conor was the son of Charles Owen O'Conor and Georgina Mary Perry. He was educated at Downside School and the University of London, graduating in law. He was called to the bar at King's Inn. In 1898 he served as High Sheriff of Roscommon, and in 1906 he was appointed Lord Lieutenant of Roscommon in succession to his father. He was a Justice of the Peace for County Roscommon and was admitted to the Privy Council of Ireland in 1916.

Honorary titles
Preceded by Charles Owen O'Conor	Lord Lieutenant of Roscommon; 1906–1917	Succeeded by William John Talbot
