= Dan Comyn =

Irish cricketer (1872–1949)

Cricket information
- Batting: Right-handed
- Bowling: Leg-break

International information
- National side: Ireland

Career statistics
Competition	First-class
Matches	8
Runs scored	290
Batting average	18.12
100s/50s	0/1
Top score	54
Balls bowled	140
Wickets	0
Bowling average	–
5 wickets in innings	–
10 wickets in match	–
Best bowling	–
Catches/stumpings	1/–
- Source: CricketArchive, 6 December 2022

Andrew Daniel Comyn (23 September 1872 – 23 May 1949) was an Irish cricketer. He was a right-handed batsman and a leg-break bowler.

He played for Ireland 16 times between 1893 and 1904, making his debut against a Combined Services team. Four of these matches were first-class matches in 1902. He also played four first-class matches for Dublin University in 1895.

His brother-in-law and two nephews also played cricket for Ireland.
