= Denis O'Conor =

Irish nobleman and politician (1794–1847)

Denis O'Conor, O'Conor Don Donnchadh Ó Conchubhair, Ó Conchubhair Donn

Member of Parliament for County Roscommon
- In office July 1831 – August 1847
- Preceded by: Owen O'Conor, O'Conor Don
- Succeeded by: Oliver Dowell John Grace

Personal details
- Party: Whigs, Radicals; Repeal Association
- Spouse: Mary Blake (m. 1824)
- Children: Charles Owen O'Conor; Denis Maurice O'Conor
- Education: St Edmund's College, Ware, Trinity College, University of Dublin, Lincoln's Inn, King's Inns.
- Occupation: Barrister, landowner, politician.

Denis O'Conor, O'Conor Don (Irish: Donnchadh Ó Conchubhair Donn; 1794–1847) of Clonalis, County Roscommon, was an Irish nobleman, and Member of Parliament (MP) in the British House of Commons.

== Early life and family ==
He was born in May 1794 to Owen O'Conor, O'Conor Don and his wife Jane Moore daughter of Edward Moore of Mount Browne, County Dublin and Jane Reynolds. Denis was the eldest of four children. He had one brother Edward who became an agent for their father and then to Denis, and two sister Jane and Catherine. He was brought up in Belanagare in County Roscommon until his father moved the family to Clonalis on the death of his fourth cousin once removed, Alexander O'Conor, O'Conor Don in 1820 whom his father inherited the title of O'Conor Don.

The O'Conors were prominent Catholic gentry who had been the traditional Kings of Connacht and counted among their ancestors two twelfth-century High-Kings of Ireland, Tairrdelbach Mor Ua Conchobair and Ruaidrí Ua Conchobair who was the last high king of Ireland.

On his father's side, he was a nephew of Rev. Charles O'Conor and Matthew O'Conor. His father's first cousin was Thomas O'Conor and therefore Denis was a second cousin of Thomas's son Charles O'Conor of New York. His great-grandfather was the eminent antiquarian, writer and protagonist for catholic civil rights during the penal laws, Charles O'Conor of Belanagare.

His maternal grandfather was a wealthy Catholic brewer in Dublin who was descended from Lewis O'More youngest brother of Rory O'More. His maternal grandmother was a daughter of Thomas Reynolds of Rathfarnham and Dundrum Castle. Thomas was a successful Silk manufacturer who descended from a cadet branch of Mac Raghnaill chiefs of Lough Scur in County Leitrim. Through this connection Denis's Mother was a first cousin of Thomas Reynolds.

He was educated at St Edmund's College, Ware, Trinity College, University of Dublin, Lincoln's Inn and the King's Inn to train as a barrister and took the Grand Tour in the early 1820s.

== Career ==
In the 1820s, he supported the pro-Catholic agitation in Roscommon led by his father, the O’Conor Don, later that decade and assisted in his return for the county, following the granting of emancipation, in 1830. He moved the resolution for repeal of the legislative Union with Britain at a county meeting, on 14 January 1831, and seconded one in favour of parliamentary reform at another, on the 16 April 1831.

On the death of his father in June 1831, less than a month after he had regained his seat at the general election, he not only succeeded to his ancient title and estates, but, as heir to his father's patriotic reputation, was the obvious choice of the county's liberal Catholics for the representation. Denis was elected unopposed to the seat, which he held until his death in 1847. His father had been an emancipationist and O'Conor continued in this tradition, always voting with Daniel O'Connell.

O'Connell wrote to Denis a month after his father's death:

The death of my most respected and loved friend, your father, was to me a severe blow ... How little does the world know of the value of the public services of men who like him held themselves always in readiness without ostentation or parade but with firmness and sincerity to aid in the struggles which nations make for liberty ... I really know no one individual to whom the Catholics of Ireland are so powerfully indebted for the successful result of their contest for emancipation ... His was not holiday patriotism ... No, in the worst of times and when the storms of calumny and persecution from our enemies and apathy and treachery from our friends raged at their height he was always found at his post.

He was neither a prominent nor a particularly effective parliamentarian. His rather infrequent interventions were long-winded and pedantic, though always temperate. He was by disposition a conventional Whig rather than a repealer, but family loyalty kept him in O'Connell's camp.

In 1843, he was much drawn to the liberal–unionist alliance of William Smith O'Brien and Thomas Wyse; he joined with them in obstructing the arms bill at the end of May 1843 and supported O'Brien a few months later in drawing up his remonstrance against British policy in Ireland, which served as a manifesto for the liberal unionists. However, when O'Brien was looking for signatures O'Conor demurred because, in Wyse's opinion, he was afraid of what O'Connell would say. O'Connell spoke well but blandly of O'Conor and Charles Wood, joint Parliamentary Secretary to the Treasury, termed him ‘a gentleman, not wise but worth attention and civility’.

On 6 July 1846, O'Conor was appointed Junior Lord of the Treasury in Lord John Russell's government; he was one of five Irish MPs who obtained junior ministerial posts as a result of the Irish party's alliance with the whigs.

== Personal life ==
On 27 August 1824, he married his first cousin once removed Mary Blake (died 1841), daughter of Major Maurice Blake, of Towerhill house, in County Mayo, and Maria O'Connor, daughter of the wealthy catholic merchant Valentine O'Connor, from a cadet branch of the O'Conor Sligo who had settled in Galway and Mary Moore. Mary's father was from a cadet branch of the Blake baronets of Menlough through a younger son of Sir Valentine Blake, 3rd Baronet. They had seven children:

- Jane O'Conor. A Catholic nun at Princethorp Convent.
- Kate O'Conor. A Catholic nun at Princethorp Convent.
- Josephine O'Conor. A Catholic nun at Princethorp Convent.
- Eugenia O'Conor. A Catholic nun at Princethorp Convent.
- Dionysia O'Conor. A Catholic nun at Princethorp Convent.
- Charles Owen O'Conor, O'Conor Don (1838–1906).
- Denis Maurice O'Conor (1840–1883).

He was a founding member of the Reform Club and a member of Brooks's in London as well as being a member of the Stephen's Green Club in Dublin. He died on 22 July 1847. His eldest son Charles Owen succeeded him.

== Ancestry ==
Ancestors of Denis O'Conor

8. Charles O'Conor of Bellanagare Castle
4.Denis O'Conor of Bellanagare Castle
9. Catherine O'Hagan
2.Owen O'Conor, O'Conor Don
10. Martin Browne Esq of Cloonfad house, Co. Roscommon
5. Catherine Browne
11. Alice Mahon
1. Denis O'Conor, O'Conor Don
12. James Moore Esq of Mount Browne, Dublin
6. Edward Moore Esq of Mount Browne Co. Dublin
13. Mary Cullen
3. Jane Moore
14. Thomas Reynolds of Rathfarnham and Dundrum Castle
7. Jane Reynolds
15. Joan Grumley

== Notes ==
Parliament of the United Kingdom
| Preceded by Owen O'Conor | Member of Parliament for County Roscommon; 1831 – 1847 | Succeeded by Oliver Grace |
Political offices
| Preceded by Henry Bingham Baring; William Cripps; Swynford Carnegie; Ralph Neville | Junior Lord of the Treasury; 1846 – 1847 | Succeeded by Richard Bellew |
