= Archdeacon of Kilmore =

The Archdeacon of Kilmore is a senior ecclesiastical officer within the Diocese of Kilmore, Elphin and Ardagh.

The archdeaconry can trace its history from Maelisa Mac Gillco Erain, the earliest known incumbent, who died in 1199, to the current incumbent, Canon Ian W. Horner (incumbent Rector of Bailieborough group of parishes since 2016), who succeeded Canon Craig McCauley in 2023. Archdeacon Horner is responsible for the disciplinary supervision of the clergy within his half of the Diocese of Kilmore, Elphin and Ardagh.
