= List of MPs elected in the 1880 United Kingdom general election =

1880–1885 Parliament of the United Kingdom
←	1874–1880 Parliament	1885–1886 Parliament	→
- The Palace of Westminster in 1880

Overview
- Legislative body: Parliament of the United Kingdom
- Jurisdiction: United Kingdom
- Meeting place: Palace of Westminster
- Term: 29 April 1880 – 18 November 1885
- Election: 1880 United Kingdom general election
- Government: Second Gladstone ministry

House of Commons
- Members: 652
- Speaker: Sir Henry Brand (until 1884); Arthur Peel
- Leader: William Ewart Gladstone
- Prime Minister: William Ewart Gladstone
- Leader of the Opposition: Benjamin Disraeli (until 1881); Stafford Northcote
- Third-party leader: Charles Stewart Parnell
- Party control: Liberal Party

House of Lords
- Lord Chancellor: Roundell Palmer, 1st Earl of Selborne
- Leader: Granville Leveson-Gower, 2nd Earl Granville
- Leader of the Opposition: Marquess of Salisbury

Crown-in-Parliament Victoria

Sessions
- 1st: 29 April 1880 – 7 September 1880
- 2nd: 24 November 1880 – 27 August 1881
- 3rd: 7 February 1882 – 2 December 1882
- 4th: 15 February 1883 – 25 August 1883
- 5th: 5 February 1884 – 14 August 1884
- 6th: 23 October 1884 – 14 August 1885

This is a list of members of Parliament (MPs) elected in the 1880 general election, held from March to April 1880.

Table of contents:

A B C D E F G H I J K L M N O P Q R S T U V W X Y Z By-elections Changes

== A ==
Constituency	MP	Party
Aberdeen	John Webster	Liberal
Aberdeenshire East	Sir Alexander Hamilton-Gordon	Liberal
Aberdeenshire West	Robert Farquharson	Liberal
Abingdon	John Creemer Clarke	Liberal
Andover	Francis Buxton	Liberal
Anglesey	Richard Davies	Liberal
Antrim (two members)	James Chaine	Conservative
Antrim (two members)	Edward Macnaghten	Conservative
Argyllshire	Lord Colin Campbell	Liberal
Armagh	George Beresford	Conservative
Armagh County (two members)	Maxwell Close	Conservative
Armagh County (two members)	James Richardson	Liberal
Ashton-under-Lyne	Hugh Mason	Liberal
Athlone	Sir John Ennis, Bt	Liberal
Aylesbury (two members)	Sir Nathan Rothschild, Bt	Liberal
Aylesbury (two members)	George W. E. Russell	Liberal
Ayr Burghs	Richard Campbell	Liberal
Ayrshire North	Robert Cochran-Patrick	Conservative
Ayrshire South	Claud Alexander	Conservative
== B ==
Constituency	MP	Party
Banbury	Bernhard Samuelson	Liberal
Bandon	Percy Bernard	Conservative
Banffshire	Robert Duff	Liberal
Barnstaple (two members)	Viscount Lymington	Liberal
Barnstaple (two members)	Robert Carden	Conservative
Bath (two members)	Sir Arthur Hayter, Bt	Liberal
Bath (two members)	Edmond Wodehouse	Liberal
Beaumaris	Morgan Lloyd	Liberal
Bedford (two members)	Samuel Whitbread	Liberal
Bedford (two members)	Charles Magniac	Liberal
Bedfordshire (two members)	James Howard	Liberal
Bedfordshire (two members)	Marquess of Tavistock	Liberal
Belfast (two members)	James Corry	Conservative
Belfast (two members)	William Ewart	Conservative
Berkshire (three members)	Robert Loyd-Lindsay	Conservative
Berkshire (three members)	John Walter	Liberal
Berkshire (three members)	Philip Wroughton	Conservative
Berwickshire	Edward Marjoribanks	Liberal
Berwick-upon-Tweed (two members)	Dudley Marjoribanks	Liberal
Berwick-upon-Tweed (two members)	Hon. Henry Strutt	Liberal
Bewdley	Charles Harrison	Liberal
Birkenhead	David MacIver	Conservative
Birmingham (three members)	John Bright	Liberal
Birmingham (three members)	Philip Henry Muntz	Liberal
Birmingham (three members)	Joseph Chamberlain	Liberal
Blackburn (two members)	William Edward Briggs	Liberal
Blackburn (two members)	William Coddington	Conservative
Bodmin	Hon. Frederick Leveson-Gower	Liberal
Bolton (two members)	John Kynaston Cross	Liberal
Bolton (two members)	John Pennington Thomasson	Liberal
Boston (two members)	William Ingram	Liberal
Boston (two members)	Thomas Garfit	Conservative
Bradford (two members)	William Edward Forster	Liberal
Bradford (two members)	Alfred Illingworth	Liberal
Brecon	Cyril Flower	Liberal
Breconshire	William Fuller-Maitland	Liberal
Bridgnorth	William Henry Foster	Conservative
Bridport	Charles Warton	Conservative
Brighton (two members)	John Robert Hollond	Liberal
Brighton (two members)	William Thackeray Marriott	Liberal
Bristol (two members)	Samuel Morley	Liberal
Bristol (two members)	Lewis Fry	Liberal
Buckingham	Sir Harry Verney, Bt	Liberal
Buckinghamshire (three members)	Sir Robert Harvey, Bt	Conservative
Buckinghamshire (three members)	Hon. Thomas Fremantle	Conservative
Buckinghamshire (three members)	Hon. Rupert Carington	Liberal
Burnley	Peter Rylands	Liberal
Bury	Robert Needham Philips	Liberal
Bury St Edmunds (two members)	Edward Greene	Conservative
Bury St Edmunds (two members)	Joseph Hardcastle	Liberal
Buteshire	Thomas Russell	Liberal
== C ==
Constituency	MP	Party
Carnarvon	William Bulkeley Hughes	Liberal
Carnarvonshire	Watkin Williams	Liberal
Caithness	Sir John Sinclair, Bt	Liberal
Calne	Lord Edmond FitzMaurice	Liberal
Cambridge (two members)	William Fowler	Liberal
Cambridge (two members)	Hugh Shield	Liberal
Cambridge University (two members)	Spencer Horatio Walpole	Conservative
Cambridge University (two members)	Alexander Beresford Hope	Conservative
Cambridgeshire (three members)	Hon. Sir Henry Brand	Liberal
Cambridgeshire (three members)	Benjamin Rodwell	Conservative
Cambridgeshire (three members)	Edward Hicks	Conservative
Canterbury (two members)	Alfred Gathorne-Hardy	Conservative
Canterbury (two members)	Robert Peter Laurie	Conservative
Cardiff	Sir Edward James Reed	Liberal
Cardigan	David Davies	Liberal
Cardiganshire	Lewis Pugh Pugh	Liberal
Carlisle (two members)	Sir Wilfrid Lawson, Bt	Liberal
Carlisle (two members)	Robert Ferguson	Liberal
Carlow	Charles Dawson	Home Rule League
County Carlow (two members)	Edmund Dwyer Gray	Home Rule League
County Carlow (two members)	Donald Horne McFarlane	Home Rule League
Carmarthen Boroughs	Benjamin Thomas Williams	Liberal
Carmarthenshire (two members)	Viscount Emlyn	Conservative
Carmarthenshire (two members)	W. R. H. Powell	Liberal
Carrickfergus	Thomas Greer	Conservative
Cavan (two members)	Charles Joseph Fay	Home Rule League
Cavan (two members)	Joseph Biggar	Home Rule League
Chatham	Sir John Eldon Gorst	Conservative
Chelsea (two members)	Sir Charles Dilke, Bt	Liberal
Chelsea (two members)	Joseph Firth	Liberal
Cheltenham	Charles de Ferrieres	Liberal
Cheshire East (two members)	William Legh	Conservative
Cheshire East (two members)	William Cunliffe Brooks	Conservative
Cheshire Mid (two members)	Hon. Wilbraham Egerton	Conservative
Cheshire Mid (two members)	Piers Egerton-Warburton	Conservative
Cheshire West (two members)	Sir Philip Grey Egerton, Bt	Conservative
Cheshire West (two members)	Hon. Wilbraham Tollemache	Conservative
Chester (two members)	Hon. Beilby Lawley	Liberal
Chester (two members)	John George Dodson	Liberal
Chichester	Lord Henry Lennox	Conservative
Chippenham	Gabriel Goldney	Conservative
Christchurch	Horace Davey	Liberal
Cirencester	Thomas Chester-Master	Conservative
Clackmannanshire and Kinross-shire	Sir William Patrick Adam	Liberal
Clare (two members)	James Patrick Mahon	Home Rule League
Clare (two members)	William O'Shea	Home Rule League
Clitheroe	Richard Fort	Liberal
Clonmel	Arthur John Moore	Home Rule League
Cockermouth	Edward Waugh	Liberal
Colchester (two members)	Richard Causton	Liberal
Colchester (two members)	William Willis	Liberal
Coleraine	Sir Henry Bruce, Bt	Conservative
Cork (two members)	John Daly	Home Rule League
Cork (two members)	Charles Stewart Parnell	Home Rule League
County Cork (two members)	William Shaw	Home Rule League
County Cork (two members)	David la Touche Colthurst	Home Rule League
Cornwall East (two members)	Thomas Agar-Robartes	Liberal
Cornwall East (two members)	William Copeland Borlase	Liberal
Cornwall West	Sir John St Aubyn, Bt	Liberal
Cornwall West	Arthur Vivian	Liberal
Coventry (two members)	Sir Henry Jackson, Bt	Liberal
Coventry (two members)	William Wills	Liberal
Cricklade (two members)	Sir Daniel Gooch, Bt	Conservative
Cricklade (two members)	Nevil Story Maskelyne	Liberal
Cumberland East (two members)	Stafford Howard	Liberal
Cumberland East (two members)	Sir Richard Musgrave, Bt	Conservative
Cumberland West (two members)	Hon. Percy Wyndham	Conservative
Cumberland West (two members)	David Ainsworth	Liberal
== D ==
Constituency	MP	Party
Darlington	Theodore Fry	Liberal
Denbigh Boroughs	Sir Robert Cunliffe, Bt	Liberal
Denbighshire (two members)	Sir Watkin Williams-Wynn, Bt	Conservative
Denbighshire (two members)	George Osborne Morgan	Liberal
Derby (two members)	Michael Thomas Bass	Liberal
Derby (two members)	Samuel Plimsoll	Liberal
Derbyshire East (two members)	Hon. Francis Egerton	Liberal
Derbyshire East (two members)	Alfred Barnes	Liberal
Derbyshire North (two members)	Lord Edward Cavendish	Liberal
Derbyshire North (two members)	John Frederick Cheetham	Liberal
Derbyshire South (two members)	Sir Henry Wilmot, Bt	Conservative
Derbyshire South (two members)	William Evans	Liberal
Devizes	Sir Thomas Bateson, Bt	Conservative
Devonport (two members)	Sir John Henry Puleston	Conservative
Devonport (two members)	George Edward Price	Conservative
Devonshire East (two members)	Sir John Kennaway, Bt	Conservative
Devonshire East (two members)	William Walrond	Conservative
Devonshire North (two members)	Sir Thomas Dyke Acland, Bt	Liberal
Devonshire North (two members)	Sir Stafford Northcote, Bt	Conservative
Devonshire South (two members)	Sir Massey Lopes, Bt	Conservative
Devonshire South (two members)	John Carpenter Garnier	Conservative
Dewsbury	Sir John Simon	Liberal
Donegal (two members)	Thomas Lea	Liberal
Donegal (two members)	John Kinnear	Liberal
Dorchester	William Brymer	Conservative
Dorset (three members)	Hon. Henry Portman	Liberal
Dorset (three members)	John Floyer	Conservative
Dorset (three members)	Hon. Edward Digby	Conservative
Dover (two members)	Alexander George Dickson	Conservative
Dover (two members)	Charles Freshfield	Conservative
Down (two members)	Viscount Castlereagh	Conservative
Down (two members)	Lord Arthur Hill	Conservative
Downpatrick	John Mulholland	Conservative
Drogheda	Benjamin Whitworth	Home Rule League
Droitwich	John Corbett	Liberal
Dublin (two members)	Maurice Brooks	Home Rule League
Dublin (two members)	Robert Spencer Dyer Lyons	Liberal
County Dublin (two members)	Thomas Edward Taylor	Conservative
County Dublin (two members)	Ion Hamilton	Conservative
Dublin University	Hon. David Plunket	Conservative
Dublin University	Edward Gibson	Conservative
Dudley	Henry Brinsley Sheridan	Liberal
Dumfries	Ernest Noel	Liberal
Dumfriesshire	Robert Jardine	Liberal
Dunbartonshire	Archibald Orr-Ewing	Conservative
Dundalk	Charles Russell	Liberal
Dundee (two members)	George Armitstead	Liberal
Dundee (two members)	Frank Henderson	Liberal
Dungannon	Thomas Alexander Dickson	Liberal
Dungarvon	Frank Hugh O'Donnell	Home Rule League
Durham City (two members)	Farrer Herschell	Liberal
Durham City (two members)	Thomas Charles Thompson	Liberal
Durham County North (two members)	Charles Palmer	Liberal
Durham County North (two members)	John Joicey	Liberal
Durham County South	Joseph Pease	Liberal
Durham County South	Hon. Frederick Lambton	Liberal
== E ==
Constituency	MP	Party
East Retford (two members)	Francis Foljambe	Liberal
East Retford (two members)	Frederick Mappin	Liberal
Edinburgh (two members)	Duncan McLaren	Liberal
Edinburgh (two members)	James Cowan	Liberal
Edinburgh and St Andrews Universities	Lyon Playfair	Liberal
Elgin	M. E. Grant Duff	Liberal
Elginshire and Nairnshire	Sir George Macpherson-Grant, Bt	Liberal
Ennis	James Lysaght Finigan	Home Rule League
Enniskillen	Viscount Cole	Conservative
Essex East (two members)	James Round	Conservative
Essex East (two members)	Samuel Ruggles-Brise	Conservative
Essex South (two members)	Thomas Charles Baring	Conservative
Essex South (two members)	William Makins	Conservative
Essex West (two members)	Lord Eustace Cecil	Conservative
Essex West (two members)	Sir Henry Selwin-Ibbetson, Bt	Conservative
Evesham	Daniel Rowlinson Ratcliff	Liberal
Exeter (two members)	Edward Johnson	Liberal
Exeter (two members)	Henry Northcote	Conservative
Eye	Ellis Ashmead-Bartlett	Conservative
== F ==
Constituency	MP	Party
Falkirk Burghs	John Ramsay	Liberal
Fermanagh (two members)	William Humphrys Archdale	Conservative
Fermanagh (two members)	Viscount Crichton	Conservative
Fife	Robert Preston Bruce	Liberal
Finsbury (two members)	William McCullagh Torrens	Liberal
Finsbury (two members)	Sir Andrew Lusk, Bt	Liberal
Flint	John Roberts	Liberal
Flintshire	Lord Richard Grosvenor	Liberal
Forfarshire	James William Barclay	Liberal
Frome	Henry Samuelson	Liberal
== G ==
Constituency	MP	Party
Galway Borough (two members)	John Orrell Lever	Home Rule League
Galway Borough (two members)	T. P. O'Connor	Home Rule League
County Galway (two members)	Mitchell Henry	Home Rule League
County Galway (two members)	John Philip Nolan	Home Rule League
Gateshead	Walter James	Liberal
Glamorganshire (two members)	Christopher Rice Mansel Talbot	Liberal
Glamorganshire (two members)	Henry Vivian	Liberal
Glasgow (three members)	George Anderson	Liberal
Glasgow (three members)	Charles Cameron	Liberal
Glasgow (three members)	Robert Tweedie Middleton	Liberal
Glasgow and Aberdeen Universities	James Alexander Campbell	Conservative
Gloucester (two members) (representation suspended 1881)	Charles James Monk	Liberal
Gloucester (two members) (representation suspended 1881)	Thomas Robinson	Liberal
Gloucestershire East (two members)	Sir Michael Hicks Beach, Bt	Conservative
Gloucestershire East (two members)	John Yorke	Conservative
Gloucestershire West (two members)	Robert Kingscote	Liberal
Gloucestershire West (two members)	Henry Reynolds-Moreton	Liberal
Grantham (two members)	John William Mellor	Liberal
Grantham (two members)	Charles Savile Roundell	Liberal
Gravesend	Thomas Bevan	Liberal
Great Grimsby	Edward Heneage	Liberal
Great Marlow	Owen Williams	Conservative
Greenock	James Stewart	Liberal
Greenwich (two members)	Thomas Boord	Conservative
Greenwich (two members)	Baron Henry de Worms	Conservative
Guildford	Denzil Onslow	Conservative
== H ==
Constituency	MP	Party
Hackney (two members)	John Holms	Liberal
Hackney (two members)	Henry Fawcett	Liberal
Haddington	Sir David Wedderburn, Bt	Liberal
Haddingtonshire	Lord Elcho	Conservative
Halifax (two members)	Sir James Stansfeld	Liberal
Halifax (two members)	John Dyson Hutchinson	Liberal
Hampshire North (two members)	William Wither Bramston Beach	Conservative
Hampshire North (two members)	George Sclater-Booth	Conservative
Hampshire South (two members)	Lord Henry Douglas-Scott-Montagu	Conservative
Hampshire South (two members)	Francis Compton	Conservative
The Hartlepools	Thomas Richardson	Liberal
Harwich	Sir Henry Tyler	Conservative
Hastings (two members)	Thomas Brassey	Liberal
Hastings (two members)	Charles James Murray	Conservative
Haverfordwest	William Edwardes	Liberal
Hawick	George Trevelyan	Liberal
Helston	William Molesworth-St Aubyn	Conservative
Hereford (two members)	Joseph Pulley	Liberal
Hereford (two members)	Robert Reid	Liberal
Herefordshire (three members)	Sir Joseph Bailey, Bt	Conservative
Herefordshire (three members)	Michael Biddulph	Liberal
Herefordshire (three members)	Thomas Duckham	Liberal
Hertford	Arthur Balfour	Conservative
Hertfordshire (three members)	Hon. Henry Cowper	Liberal
Hertfordshire (three members)	Abel Smith	Conservative
Hertfordshire (three members)	Frederick Halsey	Conservative
Horsham	Sir Henry Fletcher, Bt	Conservative
Huddersfield	Edward Leatham	Liberal
Huntingdon	Edward Montagu	Conservative
Huntingdonshire (two members)	William Fellowes	Conservative
Huntingdonshire (two members)	Lord Douglas Gordon	Liberal
Hythe	Edward Watkin	Liberal
== I ==
Constituency	MP	Party
Inverness	Charles Fraser-Mackintosh	Liberal
Inverness-shire	Donald Cameron	Conservative
Ipswich (two members)	Thomas Cobbold	Conservative
Ipswich (two members)	Jesse Collings	Liberal
Isle of Wight	Hon. Evelyn Ashley	Liberal
== K ==
Constituency	MP	Party
Kendal	John Whitwell	Liberal
Kent East (two members)	Edward Leigh Pemberton	Conservative
Kent East (two members)	Aretas Akers-Douglas	Conservative
Kent Mid (two members)	Sir William Hart Dyke, Bt	Conservative
Kent Mid (two members)	Sir Edmund Filmer, Bt	Conservative
Kent West (two members)	Sir Charles Mills, Bt	Conservative
Kent West (two members)	Viscount Lewisham	Conservative
Kerry (two members)	Rowland Ponsonby Blennerhassett	Home Rule League
Kerry (two members)	Sir Rowland Blennerhassett, Bt	Liberal
Kidderminster	John Brinton	Liberal
Kildare (two members)	Charles Henry Meldon	Home Rule League
Kildare (two members)	James Leahy	Home Rule League
Kilkenny City	John Francis Smithwick	Home Rule League
County Kilkenny (two members)	Patrick Martin	Home Rule League
County Kilkenny (two members)	Edward Marum	Home Rule League
Kilmarnock Burghs	John Dick Peddie	Liberal
Kincardineshire	Sir George Balfour	Liberal
King's County (two members)	Sir Patrick O'Brien, Bt	Home Rule League
King's County (two members)	Bernard Charles Molloy	Home Rule League
King's Lynn (two members)	Hon. Robert Bourke	Conservative
King's Lynn (two members)	Sir William ffolkes, Bt	Liberal
Kingston upon Hull (two members)	Charles Morgan Norwood	Liberal
Kingston upon Hull (two members)	Charles Wilson	Liberal
Kinsale	Eugene Collins	Home Rule League
Kirkcaldy Burghs	Sir George Campbell	Liberal
Kirkcudbright	John Heron-Maxwell	Liberal
Knaresborough	Sir Henry Meysey-Thompson, Bt	Liberal
== L ==
Constituency	MP	Party
Lambeth (two members)	Sir James Lawrence, Bt	Liberal
Lambeth (two members)	William McArthur	Liberal
Lanarkshire North	Sir Thomas Colebrooke, Bt	Liberal
Lanarkshire South	John Hamilton	Liberal
Lancashire North (two members)	Hon. Frederick Stanley	Conservative
Lancashire North (two members)	Joseph Feilden	Conservative
Lancashire North-East (two members)	Spencer Cavendish	Liberal
Lancashire North-East (two members)	Frederick William Grafton	Liberal
Lancashire South-East (two members)	Robert Leake	Liberal
Lancashire South-East (two members)	William Agnew	Liberal
Lancashire South-West (two members)	R. A. Cross	Conservative
Lancashire South-West (two members)	John Ireland Blackburne	Conservative
Launceston	Sir Hardinge Giffard	Conservative
Leeds (three members)	John Barran	Liberal
Leeds (three members)	William Ewart Gladstone	Liberal
Leeds (three members)	William Jackson	Conservative
Leicester (two members)	Peter Alfred Taylor	Liberal
Leicester (two members)	Alexander McArthur	Liberal
Leicestershire North (two members)	John Manners	Conservative
Leicestershire North (two members)	Edwyn Sherard Burnaby	Conservative
Leicestershire South (two members)	Albert Pell	Conservative
Leicestershire South (two members)	Thomas Paget	Liberal
Leith Burghs	Andrew Grant	Liberal
Leitrim (two members)	Francis O'Beirne	Home Rule League
Leitrim (two members)	Arthur Loftus Tottenham	Conservative
Leominster	James Rankin	Conservative
Lewes	William Christie	Conservative
Lichfield	Richard Dyott	Conservative
Limerick City (two members)	Richard O'Shaughnessy	Home Rule League
Limerick City (two members)	Daniel Fitzgerald Gabbett	Home Rule League
County Limerick (two members)	Edward John Synan	Home Rule League
County Limerick (two members)	William Henry O'Sullivan	Home Rule League
Lincoln (two members)	Charles Seely	Liberal
Lincoln (two members)	John Hinde Palmer	Liberal
Lincolnshire Mid (two members)	Henry Chaplin	Conservative
Lincolnshire Mid (two members)	Hon. Edward Stanhope	Conservative
Lincolnshire North (two members)	Rowland Winn	Conservative
Lincolnshire North (two members)	Robert Laycock	Liberal
Lincolnshire South (two members)	Sir William Welby-Gregory, Bt	Conservative
Lincolnshire South (two members)	John Compton Lawrance	Conservative
Linlithgowshire	Peter McLagan	Liberal
Lisburne	Sir Richard Wallace, Bt	Conservative
Liskeard	Leonard Courtney	Liberal
Liverpool (three members)	Viscount Sandon	Conservative
Liverpool (three members)	Edward Whitley	Conservative
Liverpool (three members)	John Ramsay	Liberal
City of London (four members)	William Cotton	Conservative
City of London (four members)	John Hubbard	Conservative
City of London (four members)	Robert Fowler	Conservative
City of London (four members)	William Lawrence	Liberal
London University	Robert Lowe	Liberal
Londonderry	Charles Lewis	Conservative
Londonderry County (two members)	Hugh Law	Liberal
Londonderry County (two members)	Sir Thomas McClure, Bt	Liberal
Longford (two members)	George Errington	Home Rule League
Longford (two members)	Justin McCarthy	Home Rule League
Louth County (two members)	Alexander Martin Sullivan	Home Rule League
Louth County (two members)	Philip Callan	Home Rule League
Ludlow	George Windsor-Clive	Conservative
Lymington	Edmund Hegan Kennard	Conservative
== M ==
Constituency	MP	Party
Macclesfield (two members)	William Brocklehurst	Liberal
Macclesfield (two members)	David Chadwick	Liberal
Maidstone (two members)	Alexander Henry Ross	Conservative
Maidstone (two members)	John Evans Freke-Aylmer	Conservative
Maldon	George Courtauld	Liberal
Mallow	William Moore Johnson	Liberal
Malmesbury	Walter Powell	Conservative
Malton	Charles Wentworth-Fitzwilliam	Liberal
Manchester (three members)	Hugh Birley	Conservative
Manchester (three members)	Jacob Bright	Liberal
Manchester (three members)	John Slagg	Liberal
Marlborough	Lord Charles Brudenell-Bruce	Liberal
Marylebone (two members)	Sir Thomas Chambers	Liberal
Marylebone (two members)	Daniel Grant	Liberal
Mayo (two members)	John O'Connor Power	Home Rule League
Mayo (two members)	Charles Stewart Parnell (seat taken by Isaac Nelson on 26 May)	Home Rule League
Meath (two members)	Charles Stewart Parnell	Home Rule League
Meath (two members)	Robert Henry Metge	Home Rule League
Merioneth	Samuel Holland	Liberal
Merthyr Tydvil (two members)	Henry Richard	Liberal
Merthyr Tydvil (two members)	Charles James	Liberal
Middlesbrough	Isaac Wilson	Liberal
Middlesex (two members)	Lord George Hamilton	Conservative
Middlesex (two members)	Octavius Coope	Conservative
Midhurst	Sir Henry Holland, Bt	Conservative
Midlothian	William Ewart Gladstone	Liberal
Monaghan (two members)	John Givan	Liberal
Monaghan (two members)	William Findlater	Liberal
Monmouth Boroughs	Edward Carbutt	Liberal
Monmouthshire (two members)	Frederick Courtenay Morgan	Conservative
Monmouthshire (two members)	John Rolls	Conservative
Montgomery	Hon. Frederick Hanbury-Tracy	Liberal
Montgomeryshire	Stuart Rendel	Liberal
Montrose	William Edward Baxter	Liberal
Morpeth	Thomas Burt	Liberal
== N ==
Constituency	MP	Party
Newark (two members)	Thomas Earp	Liberal
Newark (two members)	William Newzam Nicholson	Conservative
Newcastle-under-Lyme (two members)	William Shepherd Allen	Liberal
Newcastle-under-Lyme (two members)	Charles Donaldson-Hudson	Conservative
Newcastle-upon-Tyne (two members)	Joseph Cowen	Liberal
Newcastle-upon-Tyne (two members)	Ashton Wentworth Dilke	Liberal
Newport (Isle of Wight)	Charles Clifford	Liberal
New Ross	Joseph Foley	Home Rule League
Newry	Henry Thomson	Conservative
New Shoreham (two members)	Sir Walter Burrell, Bt	Conservative
New Shoreham (two members)	Robert Loder	Conservative
Norfolk North (two members)	Sir Edmund Lacon, Bt	Conservative
Norfolk North (two members)	Edward Birkbeck	Conservative
Norfolk South (two members)	Sir Robert Buxton, Bt	Conservative
Norfolk South (two members)	Robert Gurdon	Liberal
Norfolk West (two members)	George Bentinck	Conservative
Norfolk West (two members)	William Tyssen-Amherst	Conservative
Northallerton	George Elliot	Conservative
Northampton (two members)	Henry Labouchère	Liberal
Northampton (two members)	Charles Bradlaugh	Liberal
Northamptonshire North (two members)	Brownlow Cecil	Conservative
Northamptonshire North (two members)	Hon. Charles Spencer	Liberal
Northamptonshire South (two members)	Sir Rainald Knightley, Bt	Conservative
Northamptonshire South (two members)	Fairfax Cartwright	Conservative
Northumberland North (two members)	Henry Percy	Conservative
Northumberland North (two members)	Sir Matthew White Ridley, Bt	Conservative
Northumberland South (two members)	Wentworth Beaumont	Liberal
Northumberland South (two members)	Albert Grey	Liberal
Norwich (two members)	Jeremiah Colman	Liberal
Norwich (two members)	Jacob Henry Tillett	Liberal
Nottingham (two members)	Charles Seely	Liberal
Nottingham (two members)	John Skirrow Wright	Liberal
Nottinghamshire North (two members)	The Viscount Galway	Conservative
Nottinghamshire North (two members)	Cecil Foljambe	Liberal
Nottinghamshire South (two members)	Thomas Thoroton-Hildyard	Conservative
Nottinghamshire South (two members)	George Storer	Conservative
== O ==
Constituency	MP	Party
Oldham (two members)	J. T. Hibbert	Liberal
Oldham (two members)	Hon. Edward Stanley	Liberal
Orkney and Shetland	Samuel Laing	Liberal
Oxford (two members)	Sir William Vernon Harcourt	Liberal
Oxford (two members)	Joseph William Chitty	Liberal
Oxfordshire (three members)	John North	Conservative
Oxfordshire (three members)	William Cornwallis Cartwright	Liberal
Oxfordshire (three members)	Edward Vernon Harcourt	Conservative
Oxford University (two members)	John Mowbray	Conservative
Oxford University (two members)	John Gilbert Talbot	Conservative
== P ==
Constituency	MP	Party
Paisley	William Holms	Liberal
Peebles and Selkirk	Charles Tennant	Liberal
Pembroke	Henry George Allen	Liberal
Pembrokeshire	William Davies	Liberal
Penryn and Falmouth (two members)	David James Jenkins	Liberal
Penryn and Falmouth (two members)	Reginald Brett	Liberal
Perth	Charles Stuart Parker	Liberal
Perthshire	Sir Donald Currie	Liberal
Peterborough (two members)	Hon. John Wentworth-FitzWilliam	Liberal
Peterborough (two members)	George Hammond Whalley	Liberal
Petersfield	William Nicholson	Liberal
Plymouth (two members)	Edward Bates	Conservative
Plymouth (two members)	Peter Stewart Macliver	Liberal
Pontefract	Hugh Childers	Liberal
Pontefract	Sidney Woolf	Liberal
Poole	Charles Schreiber	Conservative
Portarlington	Hon. Bernard FitzPatrick	Conservative
Portsmouth (two members)	Thomas Charles Bruce	Conservative
Portsmouth (two members)	Sir Henry Drummond Wolff	Conservative
Preston (two members)	Edward Hermon	Conservative
Preston (two members)	Sir John Holker	Conservative
== Q ==
Queen's County (two members)	Richard Lalor	Home Rule League
Queen's County (two members)	Arthur O'Connor	Home Rule League
== R ==
Constituency	MP	Party
Radnor	Spencer Cavendish	Liberal
Radnorshire	Sir Richard Green-Price, Bt	Liberal
Reading (two members)	George Shaw-Lefevre	Liberal
Reading (two members)	George Palmer	Liberal
Renfrewshire	William Mure	Liberal
Richmond (Yorkshire)	John Dundas	Liberal
Ripon	George Goschen	Liberal
Rochdale	Thomas Bayley Potter	Liberal
Rochester (two members)	Arthur Otway	Liberal
Rochester (two members)	Roger Leigh	Conservative
Roscommon (two members)	Andrew Commins	Home Rule League
Roscommon (two members)	James Joseph O'Kelly	Home Rule League
Ross and Cromarty	Alexander Matheson	Liberal
Roxburghshire	Hon. Arthur Elliot	Liberal
Rutland (two members)	Gerard Noel	Conservative
Rutland (two members)	George Finch	Conservative
Rye	Frederick Andrew Inderwick	Liberal
== S ==
Constituency	MP	Party
St Andrews	Stephen Williamson	Liberal
St Ives	Sir Charles Reed	Liberal
Salford (two members)	Benjamin Armitage	Liberal
Salford (two members)	Arthur Arnold	Liberal
Salisbury (two members)	William Grenfell	Liberal
Salisbury (two members)	John Passmore Edwards	Liberal
Sandwich (two members)	Edward Knatchbull-Hugessen	Liberal
Sandwich (two members)	Henry Brassey	Liberal
Scarborough (two members)	Sir Harcourt Vanden-Bempde-Johnstone, Bt	Liberal
Scarborough (two members)	William Sproston Caine	Liberal
Shaftesbury	Hon. Sidney Glyn	Liberal
Sheffield (two members)	A. J. Mundella	Liberal
Sheffield (two members)	Charles Stuart-Wortley	Conservative
Shrewsbury (two members)	Charles Cecil Cotes	Liberal
Shrewsbury (two members)	Henry Robertson	Liberal
Shropshire North (two members)	Viscount Newport	Conservative
Shropshire North (two members)	Stanley Leighton	Conservative
Shropshire South (two members)	John Edmund Severne	Conservative
Shropshire South (two members)	Sir Baldwyn Leighton, Bt	Conservative
County Sligo (two members)	Denis Maurice O'Conor	Home Rule League
County Sligo (two members)	Thomas Sexton	Home Rule League
Somerset East (two members)	Sir Philip Miles, Bt	Conservative
Somerset East (two members)	Lord Brooke	Conservative
Somerset Mid (two members)	Sir Richard Paget, Bt	Conservative
Somerset Mid (two members)	William Gore-Langton	Conservative
Somerset West (two members)	Vaughan Vaughan-Lee	Conservative
Somerset West (two members)	Mordaunt Bisset	Conservative
Southampton (two members)	Henry Lee	Liberal
Southampton (two members)	Charles Parker Butt	Liberal
South Shields	James Cochran Stevenson	Liberal
Southwark (two members)	Arthur Cohen	Liberal
Southwark (two members)	Thorold Rogers	Liberal
Stafford (two members)	Alexander Macdonald	Liberal
Stafford (two members)	Charles McLaren	Liberal
Staffordshire East (two members)	Michael Bass	Liberal
Staffordshire East (two members)	Henry Wiggin	Liberal
Staffordshire North (two members)	William Young Craig	Liberal
Staffordshire North (two members)	Harry Davenport	Conservative
Staffordshire West (two members)	Francis Monckton	Conservative
Staffordshire West (two members)	Alexander Staveley Hill	Conservative
Stalybridge	William Summers	Liberal
Stamford	Marston Clarke Buszard	Liberal
Stirling Burghs	Henry Campbell-Bannerman	Liberal
Stirlingshire	Joseph Cheney Bolton	Liberal
Stockport (two members)	Charles Henry Hopwood	Liberal
Stockport (two members)	Frederick Pennington	Liberal
Stockton	Joseph Dodds	Liberal
Stoke-upon-Trent (two members)	William Woodall	Liberal
Stoke-upon-Trent (two members)	Henry Broadhurst	Liberal
Stroud (two members)	Walter John Stanton	Liberal
Stroud (two members)	Henry Brand	Liberal
Suffolk East (two members)	The Lord Rendlesham	Conservative
Suffolk East (two members)	Frederick St John Barne	Conservative
Suffolk West (two members)	Thomas Thornhill	Conservative
Suffolk West (two members)	William Biddell	Conservative
Sunderland (two members)	Sir Edward Temperley Gourley	Liberal
Sunderland (two members)	Sir Henry Havelock-Allan, Bt	Liberal
Surrey East (two members)	James Watney	Conservative
Surrey East (two members)	William Grantham	Conservative
Surrey Mid (two members)	Sir Henry Peek, Bt	Conservative
Surrey Mid (two members)	Sir James Lawrence, Bt	Conservative
Surrey West (two members)	George Cubitt	Conservative
Surrey West (two members)	Hon. St John Brodrick	Conservative
Sussex East (two members)	George Burrow Gregory	Conservative
Sussex East (two members)	Montagu Scott	Conservative
Sussex West (two members)	Sir Walter Barttelot, Bt	Conservative
Sussex West (two members)	Earl of March	Conservative
Sutherland	Marquess of Stafford	Liberal
Swansea District	Lewis Llewelyn Dillwyn	Liberal
== T ==
Constituency	MP	Party
Tamworth (two members)	Hamar Alfred Bass	Liberal
Tamworth (two members)	Jabez Balfour	Liberal
Taunton (two members)	Sir Henry James	Liberal
Taunton (two members)	Sir William Palliser	Conservative
Tavistock	Lord Arthur Russell	Liberal
Tewkesbury	William Edwin Price	Liberal
Thirsk	Lewis Payn Dawnay	Conservative
Tipperary (two members)	Patrick James Smyth	Home Rule League
Tipperary (two members)	John Dillon	Home Rule League
Tiverton (two members)	Sir John Heathcoat-Amory, Bt	Liberal
Tiverton (two members)	William Nathaniel Massey	Liberal
Tower Hamlets (two members)	Charles Ritchie	Conservative
Tower Hamlets (two members)	James Bryce	Liberal
Tralee	Daniel O'Donoghue	Home Rule League
Truro (two members)	Sir James McGarel-Hogg, Bt	Conservative
Truro (two members)	Edward Brydges Willyams	Liberal
Tynemouth and North Shields	Thomas Eustace Smith	Liberal
Tyrone (two members)	John Ellison-Macartney	Conservative
Tyrone (two members)	Edward Falconer Litton	Liberal
== W ==
Constituency	MP	Party
Wakefield	Robert Bownas Mackie	Liberal
Wallingford	Walter Wren	Liberal
Walsall	Sir Charles Forster, Bt	Liberal
Wareham	Montague Guest	Liberal
Warrington	John Gordon McMinnies	Liberal
Warwick (two members)	Arthur Peel	Liberal
Warwick (two members)	George Repton	Conservative
Warwickshire North (two members)	Charles Newdigate Newdegate	Conservative
Warwickshire North (two members)	William Bromley-Davenport	Conservative
Warwickshire South (two members)	Sir John Eardley-Wilmot, Bt	Conservative
Warwickshire South (two members)	Gilbert Leigh	Liberal
Waterford City (two members)	Richard Power	Home Rule League
Waterford City (two members)	Edmund Leamy	Home Rule League
County Waterford (two members)	Henry Villiers-Stuart	Liberal
County Waterford (two members)	John Aloysius Blake	Home Rule League
Wednesbury	Alexander Brogden	Liberal
Wenlock (two members)	Alexander Brown	Liberal
Wenlock (two members)	Hon. Cecil Weld-Forester	Conservative
Westbury	Charles Phipps	Conservative
Westmeath (two members)	Timothy Daniel Sullivan	Home Rule League
Westmeath (two members)	Henry Joseph Gill	Home Rule League
Westminster (two members)	William Smith	Conservative
Westminster (two members)	Sir Charles Russell, Bt	Conservative
Westmorland (two members)	William Lowther	Conservative
Westmorland (two members)	Thomas Taylour	Conservative
Wexford	William Redmond	Home Rule League
County Wexford (two members)	John Barry	Home Rule League
County Wexford (two members)	Garrett Byrne	Home Rule League
Weymouth and Melcombe Regis (two members)	Henry Edwards	Liberal
Weymouth and Melcombe Regis (two members)	Sir Frederick Johnstone, Bt	Conservative
Whitby	Arthur Pease	Liberal
Whitehaven	George Cavendish-Bentinck	Conservative
Wick District	John Pender	Liberal
Wicklow (two members)	William Joseph Corbet	Home Rule League
Wicklow (two members)	James Carlile McCoan	Home Rule League
Wigan (two members)	Lord Balniel	Conservative
Wigan (two members)	Thomas Knowles	Conservative
Wigtown	John McLaren	Liberal
Wigtownshire	Sir Herbert Maxwell, Bt	Conservative
Wilton	Hon. Sidney Herbert	Conservative
Wiltshire North (two members)	George Sotheron-Estcourt	Conservative
Wiltshire North (two members)	Walter Long	Conservative
Wiltshire South (two members)	Lord Henry Thynne	Conservative
Wiltshire South (two members)	Viscount Folkestone	Conservative
Winchester (two members)	Viscount Baring	Liberal
Winchester (two members)	Richard Moss	Conservative
Windsor	Robert Richardson-Gardner	Conservative
Wolverhampton (two members)	Hon. Charles Pelham Villiers	Liberal
Wolverhampton (two members)	Henry Fowler	Liberal
Woodstock	Lord Randolph Churchill	Conservative
Worcester (two members)	Thomas Rowley Hill	Liberal
Worcester (two members)	Æneas John McIntyre	Liberal
Worcestershire East (two members)	William Henry Gladstone	Liberal
Worcestershire East (two members)	George Hastings	Liberal
Worcestershire West (two members)	Frederick Knight	Conservative
Worcestershire West (two members)	Sir Edmund Lechmere, Bt	Conservative
Wycombe	Hon. William Carington	Liberal
== Y ==
Constituency	MP	Party
York (two members)	Ralph Creyke	Liberal
York (two members)	Joseph Johnson Leeman	Liberal
Yorkshire East Riding (two members)	Christopher Sykes	Conservative
Yorkshire East Riding (two members)	William Harrison-Broadley	Conservative
Yorkshire North Riding (two members)	Frederick Milbank	Liberal
Yorkshire North Riding (two members)	Viscount Helmsley	Conservative
Yorkshire West Riding East (two members)	Sir Andrew Fairbairn	Liberal
Yorkshire West Riding East (two members)	Sir John Ramsden, Bt	Liberal
Yorkshire West Riding North (two members)	Lord Frederick Cavendish	Liberal
Yorkshire West Riding North (two members)	Sir Mathew Wilson, Bt	Liberal
Yorkshire West Riding South (two members)	Henry Wentworth-Fitzwilliam	Liberal
Yorkshire West Riding South (two members)	William Henry Leatham	Liberal
Youghal	Sir Joseph Neale McKenna	Home Rule League

== See also ==
- UK general election, 1880
- List of parliaments of the United Kingdom
