= Weguelin =

Weguelin is a surname. Notable people with the surname include:

- Christopher Weguelin (1838–1881), Irish politician
- John Reinhard Weguelin (1849–1927), English painter and illustrator
- Thomas Matthias Weguelin (1809–1885), English politician
