= Florence O'Driscoll =

Florence O'Driscoll (1858 – 6 January 1939) was an Irish nationalist politician and member of parliament (MP) in the House of Commons of the United Kingdom of Great Britain and Ireland.

He was elected as an Irish National Federation (Anti-Parnellite) MP for the South Monaghan constituency at the 1892 general election. He did not contest the 1895 general election.

He unsuccessfully contested the Mid Tipperary constituency at the 1900 general election as a Healyite Nationalist candidate.

Parliament of the United Kingdom
Preceded by Joseph Neale McKenna	Member of Parliament for South Monaghan; 1892 – 1895	Succeeded by James Daly
