= James Daly (Irish nationalist politician) =

Irish politician

James Daly (1852–1910) was an Irish nationalist politician and Member of Parliament (MP) in the House of Commons of the United Kingdom of Great Britain and Ireland.

He was first elected as the Irish National Federation (Anti-Parnellite) MP for the South Monaghan constituency at the 1895 general election. He was re-elected unopposed as the Irish Parliamentary Party MP at the 1900 general election.

He resigned in February 1902, owing chiefly to the refusal of the party leaders to publish the names of those members who were receiving payment from the Parliamentary fund and those who were not.

The subsequent by-election was won unopposed by John McKean of the Irish Parliamentary Party.

Parliament of the United Kingdom
Preceded by Florence O'Driscoll	Member of Parliament for South Monaghan; 1895 – 1902	Succeeded by John McKean
