= Christopher Weguelin =

Irish politician (1838–1881)

Member of Parliament for Youghal
- In office 23 November 1868 – 20 April 1869
- Preceded by: Joseph Neale McKenna
- Succeeded by: Montague Guest

Personal details
- Born: 1838
- Died: 6 September 1881 (aged 43)
- Party: Liberal

Christopher Weguelin (1838 – 6 September 1881) was an Irish Liberal politician.

Weguelin was educated at Harrow School and then Trinity College, Cambridge. Between 1867 and 1881, he was a director of the Bank of England.

Weguelin was elected MP as a Liberal candidate for Youghal in the 1868 general election, but his election was declared void the next year, due to treating. He was unseated, causing a by-election.

Parliament of the United Kingdom
Preceded by Joseph Neale McKenna	Member of Parliament for Youghal; 1868 – 1869	Succeeded by Montague Guest
