= Seán MacEntee =

Irish politician (1889–1984)

- MacEntee, c. 1920s

Tánaiste
- In office 23 June 1959 – 21 April 1965
- Taoiseach: Seán Lemass
- Preceded by: Seán Lemass
- Succeeded by: Frank Aiken

Minister for Social Welfare
- In office 27 November 1957 – 12 October 1961
- Taoiseach: Seán Lemass
- Preceded by: Paddy Smith
- Succeeded by: Kevin Boland

Minister for Health
- In office 20 March 1957 – 21 April 1965
- Taoiseach: Seán Lemass
- Preceded by: Tom O'Higgins
- Succeeded by: Donogh O'Malley

Minister for Local Government and Public Health
- In office 18 August 1941 – 18 February 1948
- Taoiseach: Éamon de Valera
- Preceded by: Éamon de Valera
- Succeeded by: Timothy J. Murphy (Local Government)

Minister for Industry and Commerce
- In office 16 September 1939 – 18 August 1941
- Taoiseach: Éamon de Valera
- Preceded by: Éamon de Valera
- Succeeded by: Sean Lemass

Minister for Finance
- In office 13 June 1951 – 2 June 1954
- Taoiseach: Éamon de Valera
- Preceded by: Patrick McGilligan
- Succeeded by: Gerard Sweetman
- In office 9 March 1932 – 16 September 1939
- Taoiseach: Éamon de Valera
- Preceded by: Ernest Blythe
- Succeeded by: Seán T. O'Kelly

Teachta Dála
- In office February 1948 – June 1969
- Constituency: Dublin South-East
- In office July 1937 – February 1948
- Constituency: Dublin Townships
- In office June 1927 – July 1937
- Constituency: Dublin County
- In office May 1921 – June 1922
- Constituency: Monaghan
- In office December 1918 – May 1921
- Constituency: Monaghan South

Personal details
- Born: John Francis McEntee; 23 August 1889 Belfast, Ireland
- Died: 9 January 1984 (aged 94) Booterstown, Dublin, Ireland
- Resting place: Glasnevin Cemetery, Dublin, Ireland
- Party: Fianna Fáil
- Other political affiliations: Sinn Féin (1918–1926); Irish Labour Party(1913–1918); Socialist Party of Ireland(1904–1913); Irish Socialist Republican Party(1903–1904)
- Spouse: Margaret Browne (m. 1921; died 1976)
- Children: 3, including Máire
- Education: Belfast Municipal College of Technology

British Army intelligence file for John McEntee

Seán Francis MacEntee (Irish: Seán Mac an tSaoi; 23 August 1889 – 9 January 1984) was an Irish Fianna Fáil politician who served as Tánaiste from 1959 to 1965, Minister for Social Welfare from 1957 to 1961, Minister for Health from 1957 to 1965, Minister for Local Government and Public Health from 1941 to 1948, Minister for Industry and Commerce from 1939 to 1941, Minister for Finance from 1932 to 1939 and 1951 to 1954. He served as a Teachta Dála (TD) from 1918 to 1969. At the time of his death, he was the last surviving member of the First Dáil.

== Early life ==
Born as John McEntee at 47 King Street, Belfast on 23 August 1889, the son of James McEntee, a publican, and his wife, Mary Owens, both of whom were from Monaghan. In 1901 and 1911, the family's address was 49 King Street. James McEntee was a prominent Nationalist member of Belfast Corporation and a close friend of Joe Devlin MP.

MacEntee was educated at St Mary's Christian Brothers School, St Malachy's College and the Belfast Municipal College of Technology where he qualified as an electrical engineer. His early political involvement was with the Irish Socialist Republican Party in Belfast city. He quickly rose through the ranks of the trade union movement becoming junior representative in the city's shipyards. Following his education MacEntee worked as an engineer in Dundalk, County Louth, and was involved in the establishment of a local corps of the Irish Volunteers in the town. He mobilised in Dundalk and fought in the General Post Office Garrison in the Easter Rising in 1916. He was sentenced to death for his part in the rising. This sentence was later commuted to life imprisonment. MacEntee was released in the general amnesty in 1917 and was later elected a member of the National Executives of both Sinn Féin and the Irish Volunteers in October 1917. MacEntee was later elected Sinn Féin Member of Parliament (MP) for Monaghan South at the 1918 general election.

== Rebellion years ==
An attempt to develop his career as a consulting engineer in Belfast was interrupted by the War of Independence in 1919. MacEntee served as Acting Commandant and Vice-Commandant of the Irish Republican Armys Belfast Brigade. He was also a member of the Volunteer Executive, a sort of Cabinet and Directory for the Minister for Defence and the HQ Staff But MacEntee remained one of the few Sinn Féiners from the north. On 6 August 1920, MacEntee presented 'a Memorial' lecture to the Dáil from the Belfast Corporation. He told the Dáil it was the only custodian of public order, and that a Nationalist pogrom was taking place, he advised them to fight Belfast. The Dáil government's policy was dubbedHibernia Irredenta or 'Greening Ireland'. Sean MacEntee was asked to resign his South Monaghan seat, after voting against a bunting celebration in Lurgan to mark the signing of the Anglo-Irish Treaty.

=== Path to civil war ===
From April 1921, when MacEntee was transferred to Dublin to direct a special anti-partition campaign (Belfast Boycott) in connection with the May general election. The boycott was in response to the expulsion of Catholic workers from Belfast's shipyards and mills (see The Troubles in Ulster (1920–1922). MacEntee strongly advocated for the use of the boycott. It remained Collins's policy, he declared, that the largely Protestant shipyard workers of Belfast were being directed by the British, urging all Irishmen to rejoin the Republic. Correspondingly the Ulster Unionist Council rejected the call for a review of the boundary commission decision made on Northern Ireland. But when Ulstermen chose James Craig as Premier, Collins denounced democracy in the north as a sham. It was on the partition of Ireland issue that MacEntee voted against the Anglo-Irish Treaty of 1921. During the subsequent Civil War MacEntee commanded the IRA unit in Marlboro Street Post Office in Dublin. He later fought with Cathal Brugha in the Hamman Hotel and was subsequently interned in Kilmainham and Gormanstown until December 1923.

=== Politician in the Free State ===
After his release from prison, MacEntee devoted himself more fully to his engineering practice, although he unsuccessfully contested Dublin County by-election of 1924. He became a founder-member of Fianna Fáil in 1926 and was eventually elected a TD for Dublin County at the 1927 general election.

MacEntee founded the Association of Patent Agents in 1929, having gained his interest in Patents when he worked as an assistant engineer in Dundalk Urban District Council. On MacEntee's appointment as Minister for Finance in 1932, his colleague, Francis Litton who was acting as Secretary of the Association, circulated the members with a notice to the effect that the Association was "suspended" until MacEntee could return as he now had to devote his energies to the affairs of the State. However, the other members decided to carry on. MacEntee must have valued his status as a Patent Agent since he maintained his name on the Register for over 30 years while he held Ministerial rank in the Irish Government, although he is not thought to have taken any active part in the patent business, which was carried on by his business partners.

== In the first Fianna Fáil government (1932–1948) ==
In 1932, Fianna Fáil came to power for the very first time, with MacEntee becoming Minister for Finance. In keeping with the party's protectionist economic policies, his first budget in March of that year saw the introduction of new duties on forty-three imports, many of them coming from Britain. This saw retaliation from the British government, which in turn provoked a response from the Irish government. This was the beginning of the Economic War between the two nations, however, a treaty in 1938, signed by MacEntee and other senior members brought an end to the issue.

During the Dáil debates on the Constitution of Ireland in 1937, MacEntee described it as 'the Constitution of a Catholic State'.

In 1939, World War II broke out and a cabinet reshuffle resulted in MacEntee being appointed as Minister for Industry and Commerce, taking over from his rival Seán Lemass. During his tenure at this department, MacEntee introduced the important Trade Union Act (1941). In 1941, another reshuffle of ministers took place, with MacEntee becoming Minister for Local Government and Public Health. The Health portfolio was transferred to a new Department of Health in 1947. Following the 1948 general election, Fianna Fáil returned to the opposition benches for the first time in sixteen years.

== Later Fianna Fáil governments (1951–1954, 1957–1965) ==
In 1951, Fianna Fáil were back in government, although in minority status, depending on independent deputies for survival. MacEntee once again returned to the position of Minister for Finance where he felt it was vital to deal with the balance of payments deficit. He brought in a harsh budget in 1951 which raised income tax and tariffs on imports. His chief aim was to cut spending and reduce imports, however, this came at a cost as unemployment increased sharply. The increases were retained in his next two budgets in 1952 and 1953. It is often said that it was MacEntee's performance during this period that cost Fianna Fáil the general election in 1954. The poor grasp of economics also did his political career tremendous damage as up to that point he was seen as a likely successor as Taoiseach. Now, however, Seán Lemass was firmly seen as the "heir apparent".

In 1957, Fianna Fáil returned to power with an overall majority with MacEntee being appointed Minister for Health. The financial and economic portfolios were dominated by Lemass and other like-minded ministers who wanted to move away from protection to free trade. He is credited during this period with the reorganisation of the health services, the establishment of separate departments of health and social welfare, and the fluoridation of water supplies in Ireland. In 1959, MacEntee became Tánaiste when Seán Lemass was elected Taoiseach.

== Retirement and death ==
Following the 1965 general election, MacEntee was 76 years old and retired from the government. This did not mean that he went quietly to the backbenches. He re-emerged in 1966 to launch a verbal attack on Seán Lemass for deciding to step down as party leader and Taoiseach. The two men, however, patched up their differences shortly afterwards. MacEntee retired from Dáil Éireann in 1969 at the age of 80, making him the oldest TD in Irish history.

He had a negative view of the Provisional IRA.

MacEntee served in the Parliamentary Assembly of the Council of Europe and repeatedly proposed amendments that would have watered down resolutions against the Greek junta (see Greek case).

MacEntee died in Dublin on 9 January 1984, at the age of 94.

== Family ==
In June 1921, he married a strongly nationalistic woman from County Tipperary, Margaret Browne (1893–1976), who later taught Irish at Alexandra College and then at UCD. Among Margaret's brothers were Cardinal Michael Browne, poet and academic Monsignor Pádraig de Brún, and author Monsignor Maurice Browne. One of Seán and Margaret's daughters was the Irish poet Máire Mhac an tSaoi (1922 - 2021). She was married to the politician Conor Cruise O'Brien until his death. Their other daughter was Barbara MacEntee-Biggar (1928–1995), who was married to Irish Ambassador Frank Biggar (1917–1974); Barbara and Frank's eldest son is former Irish ambassador John Biggar (1952–). Barbara and Frank's third son was Maurice Biggar (1956–2023), a "young star of L&H debates, diplomat, barrister, gaeilgeoir, linguist and poet". Seán and Margaret also had a son, Seamus MacEntee (1924–2000), who lived mostly in England, working as a psychiatrist, as well as being an artist painting under the name Sagesson ("Sage's son" is an English translation of the name MacEntee, which is an anglicisation of the Irish Mac an tSaoi, meaning "Son of the wise man").

== Bibliographical sources ==
- Beaslai, Piaras, Michael Collins and the Making of a New Ireland 2 vols, (Dublin 1926)
- Boyce, George D & Alan O' Day (eds.) The Ulster Crisis 1885–1921 (Basingstoke 2006)
- Coogan, Tim Pat, Michael Collins: A biography (London 1990)
- Costello, Francis, Enduring the Most: The Life and Death of Terence MacSwiney (Dingle 1995)
- Curran, Joseph, The Birth of the Irish Free State (Tuscaloosa, Ala, USA 1980)
- Doherty, Gabriel & Dermot Keogh (eds) Michael Collins and the Making of the Irish State (Cork 1998)
- Farrell, Brian, Creation of the Dail (Dublin 1994)
- Feeney, Tom (2009). Seán MacEntee: a political life. Irish Academic Press. ISBN 9780716529125. Original from the University of Michigan. Digitized 30 Jun 2010
- Foy, Michael T., Michael Collins' Intelligence War: The Struggle between the British and the IRA 1919–1921 (Stroud 2006)
- Lynch, Robert, The Northern IRA and the Early Years of Partition, 1920–1922 (Dublin 2006)
- McDermott, Jim, Northern Divisions: The Old IRA and the Belfast Pogroms 1920–22 (Belfast 2001)
- Morgan, Austen, Labour and Partition: The Belfast Working Class 1905–23 (London 1990)
- Phoenix, Eamon, Northern Nationalism: Nationalist Politics, Partition and the Catholic Minority in Northern Ireland, 1890–1940 (Belfast 1994)

Parliament of the United Kingdom
Preceded by John McKean	Member of Parliament for Monaghan South; 1918–1922	Constituency abolished
Oireachtas
New constituency	Teachta Dála for Monaghan South; 1918–1921	Constituency abolished
Political offices
Preceded by Ernest Blythe	Minister for Finance; 1932–1939	Succeeded by Seán T. O'Kelly
Preceded by Seán Lemass	Minister for Industry and Commerce; 1939–1941	Succeeded by Seán Lemass
Preceded by Éamon de Valera	Minister for Local Government and Public Health; 1941–1948	Succeeded by Timothy J. Murphy as Minister for Local Government
Preceded by Patrick McGilligan	Minister for Finance; 1951–1954	Succeeded by Gerard Sweetman
Preceded by Tom O'Higgins	Minister for Health; 1957–1965	Succeeded by Donogh O'Malley
Preceded by Paddy Smith	Minister for Social Welfare; 1957–1961	Succeeded by Kevin Boland
Preceded by Seán Lemass	Tánaiste; 1959–1965	Succeeded by Frank Aiken

Dáil	Election	Deputy (Party)	Deputy (Party)	Deputy (Party)
2nd	1921	Seán MacEntee (SF)	Eoin O'Duffy (SF)	Ernest Blythe (SF)
3rd	1922	Patrick MacCarvill (AT-SF)	Eoin O'Duffy (PT-SF)	Ernest Blythe (PT-SF)
4th	1923	Patrick MacCarvill (Rep)	Patrick Duffy (CnaG)	Ernest Blythe (CnaG)
5th	1927 (Jun)	Patrick MacCarvill (FF)	Alexander Haslett (Ind.)	Ernest Blythe (CnaG)
6th	1927 (Sep)	Conn Ward (FF)	Alexander Haslett (Ind.)	Ernest Blythe (CnaG)
7th	1932	Conn Ward (FF)	Eamon Rice (FF)	Ernest Blythe (CnaG)
8th	1933	Conn Ward (FF)	Eamon Rice (FF)	Alexander Haslett (Ind.)
9th	1937	Conn Ward (FF)	Eamon Rice (FF)	James Dillon (FG)
10th	1938	Conn Ward (FF)	Bridget Rice (FF)	James Dillon (FG)
11th	1943	Conn Ward (FF)	Bridget Rice (FF)	James Dillon (Ind.)
12th	1944	Conn Ward (FF)	Bridget Rice (FF)	James Dillon (Ind.)
13th	1948	Patrick Maguire (FF)	Bridget Rice (FF)	James Dillon (Ind.)
14th	1951	Patrick Maguire (FF)	Bridget Rice (FF)	James Dillon (Ind.)
15th	1954	Patrick Mooney (FF)	Edward Kelly (FF)	James Dillon (FG)
16th	1957	Patrick Mooney (FF)	Eighneachán Ó hAnnluain (SF)	James Dillon (FG)
17th	1961	Patrick Mooney (FF)	Erskine H. Childers (FF)	James Dillon (FG)
18th	1965	Patrick Mooney (FF)	Erskine H. Childers (FF)	James Dillon (FG)
19th	1969	Billy Fox (FG)	Erskine H. Childers (FF)	John Conlan (FG)
20th	1973	Jimmy Leonard (FF)	Erskine H. Childers (FF)	John Conlan (FG)
20th	1973 by-election	Jimmy Leonard (FF)	Brendan Toal (FG)	John Conlan (FG)
21st	1977	Constituency abolished. See Cavan–Monaghan		

Dáil	Election	Deputy (Party)	Deputy (Party)	Deputy (Party)	Deputy (Party)	Deputy (Party)	Deputy (Party)	Deputy (Party)	Deputy (Party)
2nd	1921	Michael Derham (SF)	George Gavan Duffy (SF)	Séamus Dwyer (SF)	Desmond FitzGerald (SF)	Frank Lawless (SF)	Margaret Pearse (SF)	6 seats 1921–1923	
3rd	1922	Michael Derham (PT-SF)	George Gavan Duffy (PT-SF)	Thomas Johnson (Lab)	Desmond FitzGerald (PT-SF)	Darrell Figgis (Ind)	John Rooney (FP)	6 seats 1921–1923	
4th	1923	Michael Derham (CnaG)	Bryan Cooper (Ind)	Thomas Johnson (Lab)	Desmond FitzGerald (CnaG)	Darrell Figgis (Ind)	John Good (Ind)	Kathleen Lynn (Rep)	Kevin O'Higgins (CnaG)
4th	1924 by-election	Batt O'Connor (CnaG)	Bryan Cooper (Ind)	Thomas Johnson (Lab)	Desmond FitzGerald (CnaG)	Darrell Figgis (Ind)	John Good (Ind)	Kathleen Lynn (Rep)	Kevin O'Higgins (CnaG)
4th	1926 by-election	Batt O'Connor (CnaG)	Bryan Cooper (Ind)	Thomas Johnson (Lab)	Desmond FitzGerald (CnaG)	William Norton (Lab)	John Good (Ind)	Kathleen Lynn (Rep)	Kevin O'Higgins (CnaG)
5th	1927 (Jun)	Batt O'Connor (CnaG)	Bryan Cooper (Ind)	Thomas Johnson (Lab)	Desmond FitzGerald (CnaG)	Patrick Belton (FF)	John Good (Ind)	Seán MacEntee (FF)	Kevin O'Higgins (CnaG)
5th	1927 by-election	Batt O'Connor (CnaG)	Bryan Cooper (Ind)	Thomas Johnson (Lab)	Desmond FitzGerald (CnaG)	Patrick Belton (FF)	John Good (Ind)	Seán MacEntee (FF)	Gearóid O'Sullivan (CnaG)
6th	1927 (Sep)	Batt O'Connor (CnaG)	Bryan Cooper (CnaG)	Joseph Murphy (Ind)	Desmond FitzGerald (CnaG)	Seán Brady (FF)	John Good (Ind)	Seán MacEntee (FF)	Gearóid O'Sullivan (CnaG)
6th	1930 by-election	Batt O'Connor (CnaG)	Thomas Finlay (CnaG)	Joseph Murphy (Ind)	Desmond FitzGerald (CnaG)	Seán Brady (FF)	John Good (Ind)	Seán MacEntee (FF)	Gearóid O'Sullivan (CnaG)
7th	1932	Batt O'Connor (CnaG)	Thomas Finlay (CnaG)	Patrick Curran (Lab)	Henry Dockrell (CnaG)	Seán Brady (FF)	John Good (Ind)	Seán MacEntee (FF)	Gearóid O'Sullivan (CnaG)
8th	1933	Batt O'Connor (CnaG)	John A. Costello (CnaG)	Margaret Mary Pearse (FF)	Henry Dockrell (CnaG)	Seán Brady (FF)	John Good (Ind)	Seán MacEntee (FF)	Gearóid O'Sullivan (CnaG)
8th	1935 by-election	Cecil Lavery (FG)	John A. Costello (CnaG)	Margaret Mary Pearse (FF)	Henry Dockrell (CnaG)	Seán Brady (FF)	John Good (Ind)	Seán MacEntee (FF)	Gearóid O'Sullivan (CnaG)
9th	1937	Cecil Lavery (FG)	Henry Dockrell (FG)	Gerrard McGowan (Lab)	Patrick Fogarty (FF)	Seán Brady (FF)	5 seats 1937–1948		
10th	1938	Patrick Belton (FG)	Henry Dockrell (FG)	Thomas Mullen (FF)	Patrick Fogarty (FF)	Seán Brady (FF)	5 seats 1937–1948		
11th	1943	Liam Cosgrave (FG)	Henry Dockrell (FG)	James Tunney (Lab)	Patrick Fogarty (FF)	Seán Brady (FF)	5 seats 1937–1948		
12th	1944	Liam Cosgrave (FG)	Henry Dockrell (FG)	Patrick Burke (FF)	Patrick Fogarty (FF)	Seán Brady (FF)	5 seats 1937–1948		
12th	1947 by-election	Liam Cosgrave (FG)	Henry Dockrell (FG)	Patrick Burke (FF)	Seán MacBride (CnaP)	Seán Brady (FF)	5 seats 1937–1948		
13th	1948	Éamon Rooney (FG)	Seán Dunne (Lab)	Patrick Burke (FF)	3 seats 1948–1961				
14th	1951	Éamon Rooney (FG)	Seán Dunne (Lab)	Patrick Burke (FF)	3 seats 1948–1961				
15th	1954	Éamon Rooney (FG)	Seán Dunne (Lab)	Patrick Burke (FF)	3 seats 1948–1961				
16th	1957	Éamon Rooney (FG)	Kevin Boland (FF)	Patrick Burke (FF)	3 seats 1948–1961				
17th	1961	Éamon Rooney (FG)	Kevin Boland (FF)	Patrick Burke (FF)	Mark Clinton (FG)	Seán Dunne (Ind)	5 seats 1961–1969		
18th	1965	Des Foley (FF)	Kevin Boland (FF)	Patrick Burke (FF)	Mark Clinton (FG)	Seán Dunne (Lab)	5 seats 1961–1969		
19th	1969	Constituency abolished. See Dublin County North and Dublin County South							

Dáil	Election	Deputy (Party)	Deputy (Party)	Deputy (Party)
9th	1937	Seán MacEntee (FF)	John A. Costello (FG)	Ernest Benson (FG)
10th	1938	Seán MacEntee (FF)	John A. Costello (FG)	Ernest Benson (FG)
11th	1943	Seán MacEntee (FF)	Bernard Butler (FF)	Ernest Benson (FG)
12th	1944	Seán MacEntee (FF)	Bernard Butler (FF)	John A. Costello (FG)
13th	1948	Constituency abolished. See Dublin South-East		

Dáil	Election	Deputy (Party)	Deputy (Party)	Deputy (Party)	Deputy (Party)
13th	1948	John A. Costello (FG)	Seán MacEntee (FF)	Noël Browne (CnaP)	3 seats 1948–1981
14th	1951	John A. Costello (FG)	Seán MacEntee (FF)	Noël Browne (Ind.)	3 seats 1948–1981
15th	1954	John A. Costello (FG)	Seán MacEntee (FF)	John O'Donovan (FG)	3 seats 1948–1981
16th	1957	John A. Costello (FG)	Seán MacEntee (FF)	Noël Browne (Ind.)	3 seats 1948–1981
17th	1961	John A. Costello (FG)	Seán MacEntee (FF)	Noël Browne (NPD)	3 seats 1948–1981
18th	1965	John A. Costello (FG)	Seán MacEntee (FF)	Seán Moore (FF)	3 seats 1948–1981
19th	1969	Garret FitzGerald (FG)	Noël Browne (Lab)	Seán Moore (FF)	3 seats 1948–1981
20th	1973	Garret FitzGerald (FG)	Fergus O'Brien (FG)	Seán Moore (FF)	3 seats 1948–1981
21st	1977	Garret FitzGerald (FG)	Ruairi Quinn (Lab)	Seán Moore (FF)	3 seats 1948–1981
22nd	1981	Garret FitzGerald (FG)	Gerard Brady (FF)	Seán Moore (FF)	Richie Ryan (FG)
23rd	1982 (Feb)	Garret FitzGerald (FG)	Gerard Brady (FF)	Ruairi Quinn (Lab)	Alexis FitzGerald Jnr (FG)
24th	1982 (Nov)	Garret FitzGerald (FG)	Gerard Brady (FF)	Ruairi Quinn (Lab)	Joe Doyle (FG)
25th	1987	Garret FitzGerald (FG)	Gerard Brady (FF)	Ruairi Quinn (Lab)	Michael McDowell (PDs)
26th	1989	Garret FitzGerald (FG)	Gerard Brady (FF)	Ruairi Quinn (Lab)	Joe Doyle (FG)
27th	1992	Frances Fitzgerald (FG)	Eoin Ryan Jnr (FF)	Ruairi Quinn (Lab)	Michael McDowell (PDs)
28th	1997	Frances Fitzgerald (FG)	Eoin Ryan Jnr (FF)	Ruairi Quinn (Lab)	John Gormley (GP)
29th	2002	Michael McDowell (PDs)	Eoin Ryan Jnr (FF)	Ruairi Quinn (Lab)	John Gormley (GP)
30th	2007	Lucinda Creighton (FG)	Chris Andrews (FF)	Ruairi Quinn (Lab)	John Gormley (GP)
31st	2011	Lucinda Creighton (FG)	Eoghan Murphy (FG)	Ruairi Quinn (Lab)	Kevin Humphreys (Lab)
32nd	2016	Constituency abolished. See Dublin Bay South.			
