= 1902 South Monaghan by-election =

UK parliamentary by-election

The 1902 South Monaghan by-election took place on 4 March 1902 following the resignation of the incumbent MP, James Daly of the Irish Parliamentary Party. The IPP's candidate,John McKean, ran unopposed and was thus returned as the MP.
