= Henry Holroyd, 3rd Earl of Sheffield =

English politician and cricketer

Henry North Holroyd, 3rd Earl of Sheffield (18 January 1832 – 21 April 1909), styled Viscount Pevensey until 1876, was an English Conservative politician and patron of cricket. The Sheffield Shield, an Australian cricket competition, is named after him.

== Life ==
Born in Marylebone, London, Sheffield was the second but eldest surviving son of George Holroyd, 2nd Earl of Sheffield, and his wife the former Lady Harriet Lascelles, daughter of Henry Lascelles, 2nd Earl of Harewood. He was educated at Eton College, and served as a diplomat in Constantinople and Copenhagen. He sat as Conservative Member of Parliament for Sussex East from 1857 to 1865. In 1876 he succeeded his father in the earldom.

Sheffield played cricket in his younger days, including one first-class match, but is best remembered as a patron of the sport. He established a private ground at Sheffield Park near Uckfield, Sussex, and held numerous matches there, many of them against touring teams from overseas, and some of them of first-class standing. Concerned with the declining standard of cricket in Australia, he organised, financed and managed the English tour of Australia in 1891–92 under the captaincy of W. G. Grace. While in Australia he donated £150 to the New South Wales Cricket Association which was used to purchase a plate and establish the competition known as the Sheffield Shield, the domestic first-class cricket competition of Australia. He was a major benefactor of the Sussex County Cricket Club and served as its President from 1879 until 1897.

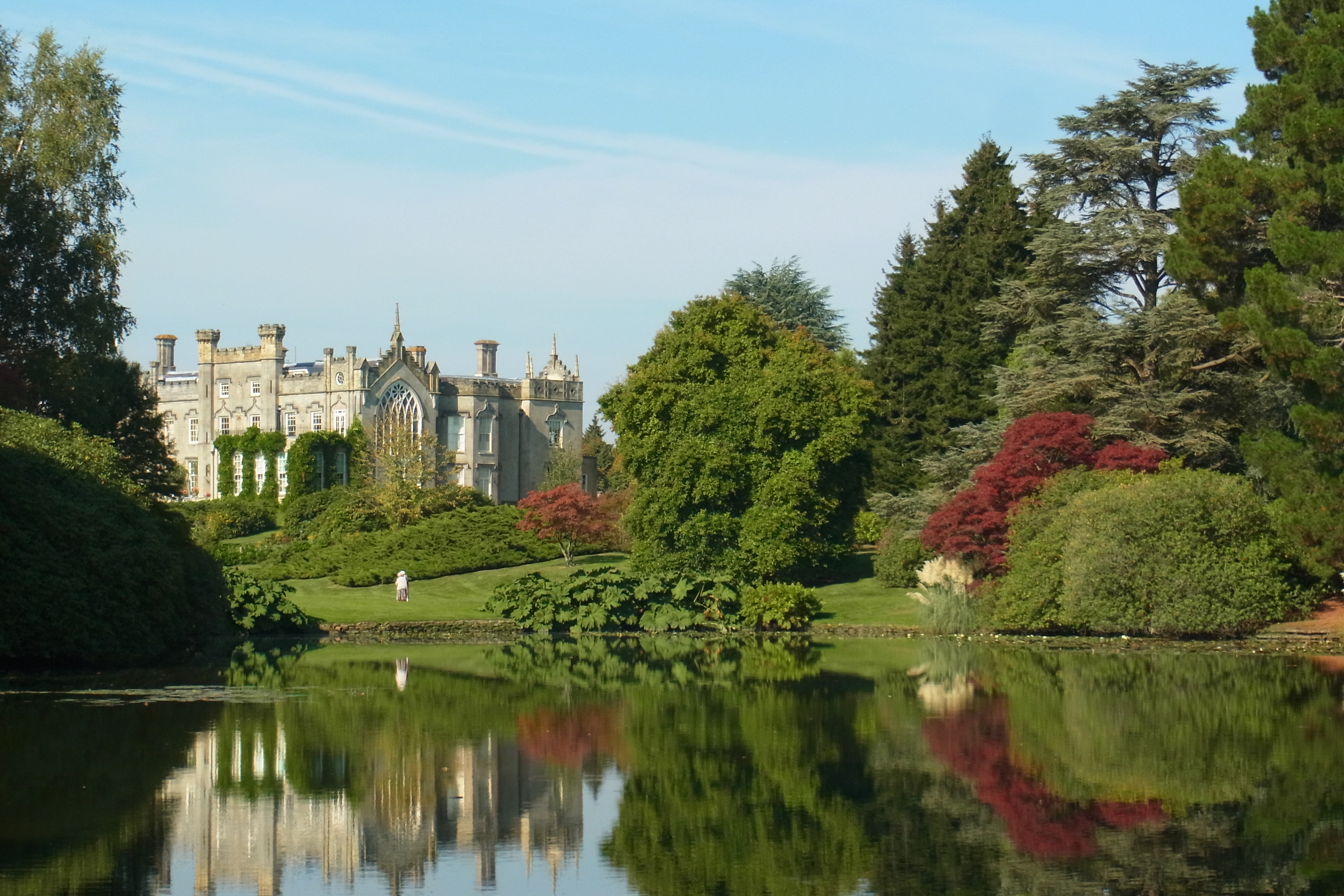
Sheffield Park House and Garden

Lord Sheffield died in Beaulieu-sur-Mer, France, in April 1909, aged 77. Rumoured to be homosexual, he remained unmarried, and on his death the earldom became extinct. However, he was succeeded in his junior title of Baron Sheffield, which had a special remainder that allowed it to be passed through female lines, by his first cousin once removed, Edward Stanley, 4th Baron Stanley of Alderley.

Parliament of the United Kingdom
Preceded by Augustus Eliott Fuller; Charles Hay Frewen	Member of Parliament for East Sussex; 1857–1865; With: Augustus Eliott Fuller 1857; John George Dodson 1857–1865	Succeeded by John George Dodson; Lord Edward Cavendish
Peerage of Ireland
Preceded by George Holroyd	Earl of Sheffield; 1876–1909	Extinct
Preceded by George Holroyd	Baron Sheffield; 1876–1909	Succeeded by Edward Stanley
Peerage of the United Kingdom
Preceded by George Holroyd	Baron Sheffield; 1876–1909	Extinct
