= Augustus Fuller (MP) =

British Conservative politician

Member of Parliament for East Sussex
- In office 12 July 1841 – 4 April 1857 Serving with Henry Holroyd (March 1857–April 1857); Charles Frewen (1846–March 1857); George Darby (1841–1846)
- Preceded by: Charles Cavendish; George Darby
- Succeeded by: Henry Holroyd; John George Dodson

Personal details
- Born: 7 May 1777
- Died: 5 August 1857 (aged 80)
- Party: Conservative
- Spouse: Clara Putland-Meyrick (m. 1801; died 1856)
- Children: Five

Augustus Eliott Fuller (7 May 1777 – 5 August 1857) was a British Conservative politician.

Fuller was the son of John Trayton Fuller, of Ashdown House, Sussex, and his wife Anne, daughter of George Augustus Eliott, 1st Baron Heathfield. In 1801, he married Clara Putland-Meyrick (1773–1856), daughter of Owen Putland-Meyrick and Clara née Garth, and they had at least five children: Clara Fuller (died 1831); Owen John Augustus Fuller-Meyrick (1805–1876); Lucy Ann Fuller (1811–1903); Catharine Sarah Fuller (c. 1815–1858); and Augusta Maria Fuller (c. 1818–1871).

After unsuccessfully contesting East Sussex at the 1837 general election, Fuller was first elected Conservative MP for the constituency in 1841, and held the seat until 1857 when he was defeated, ranking fourth and last in the poll.

Parliament of the United Kingdom
| Preceded by Charles Cavendish; George Darby | Member of Parliament for East Sussex; 1841–1857; With: Henry Holroyd (March 1857–April 1857); Charles Frewen (1846–March 1857); George Darby (1841–1846) | Succeeded by Henry Holroyd; John George Dodson |
