= South Monaghan =

Former parliamentary constituency in the United Kingdom

- Former county constituency for the House of Commons

1885–1922
- Seats: 1
- Created from: County Monaghan
- Replaced by: Monaghan

South Monaghan was a parliamentary constituency in Ireland, returning one Member of Parliament (MP) to the House of Commons of the Parliament of the United Kingdom, from 1885 to 1922.

Prior to the 1885 general election the area was part of the County Monaghan constituency. From 1922, on the establishment of the Irish Free State, it was not represented in the UK Parliament.

== Boundaries ==
This constituency comprised the southern part of County Monaghan.

1885–1922: The baronies of Cremorne and Farney.

== Members of Parliament ==
Election	Member	Party
1885	Sir Joseph Neale McKenna	Nationalist
1891	Sir Joseph Neale McKenna	Parnellite Nationalist
1892	Florence O'Driscoll	Irish National Federation
1895	James Daly	Irish National Federation
1900	James Daly	Nationalist
1902 by-election	John McKean	Nationalist
1909	John McKean	Independent Nationalist
1918	Seán MacEntee	Sinn Féin
1922	Constituency abolished	

== Elections ==
=== Elections in the 1880s ===
1885 general election: South Monaghan
Party	Candidate	Votes	%	±%
Irish Parliamentary	Joseph Neale McKenna	4,735	83.1	
Irish Conservative	Sewallis Shirley	963	16.9	
Majority		3,772	66.2	
Turnout		5,698	76.2	
Registered electors		7,474		
Irish Parliamentary win (new seat)				

1886 general election: South Monaghan
Party	Candidate	Votes	%	±%
Irish Parliamentary	Joseph Neale McKenna	4,715	82.4	−0.7
Irish Conservative	Peter Craven Westenra	1,009	17.6	+0.7
Majority		3,706	64.8	−1.4
Turnout		5,724	76.6	+0.4
Registered electors		7,474		
Irish Parliamentary hold		Swing	−0.7	

=== Elections in the 1890s ===
1892 general election: South Monaghan
Party	Candidate	Votes	%	±%
Irish National Federation	Florence O'Driscoll	4,243	80.8	−1.6
Liberal Unionist	Matthew McAuley Rutherford	1,007	19.2	+1.6
Majority		3,236	61.6	−3.2
Turnout		5,250	73.7	−2.9
Registered electors		7,120		
Irish National Federation gain from Irish Parliamentary		Swing	−1.6	

1895 general election: South Monaghan
Party	Candidate	Votes	%	±%
Irish National Federation	James Daly	3,887	79.3	−1.5
Irish Unionist	William Tenison	1,017	20.7	+1.5
Majority		2,870	58.6	−3.0
Turnout		4,904	71.0	−2.7
Registered electors		6,904		
Irish National Federation hold		Swing	−1.5	

=== Elections in the 1900s ===
1900 general election: South Monaghan
Party	Candidate	Votes	%	±%
Irish Parliamentary	James Daly	Unopposed		
Registered electors		6,705		
Irish Parliamentary hold				

Daly resigns, prompting a by-election.

South Monaghan by-election, 1902
Party	Candidate	Votes	%	±%
Irish Parliamentary	John McKean	Unopposed		
Registered electors		6,605		
Irish Parliamentary hold				

1906 general election: South Monaghan
Party	Candidate	Votes	%	±%
Irish Parliamentary	John McKean	Unopposed		
Registered electors		6,624		
Irish Parliamentary hold				

=== Elections in the 1910s ===
January 1910 general election: South Monaghan
Party	Candidate	Votes	%	±%
Ind. Nationalist	John McKean	2,611	57.8	N/A
Irish Parliamentary	Charles Laverty	1,903	42.2	N/A
Majority		708	15.6	N/A
Turnout		4,514	70.0	N/A
Registered electors		6,449		
Ind. Nationalist gain from Irish Parliamentary		Swing	N/A	

December 1910 general election: South Monaghan
Party	Candidate	Votes	%	±%
Ind. Nationalist	John McKean	Unopposed		
Registered electors		6,449		
Ind. Nationalist hold				

1918 general election: South Monaghan
Party	Candidate	Votes	%	±%
Sinn Féin	Seán MacEntee	7,524	63.0	New
Irish Parliamentary	Thomas Joseph Campbell	4,413	37.0	New
Majority		3,111	26.0	N/A
Turnout		11,937	73.8	N/A
Registered electors		16,164		
Sinn Féin gain from Ind. Nationalist		Swing	N/A	
