= Charles Cavendish, 1st Baron Chesham =

British politician

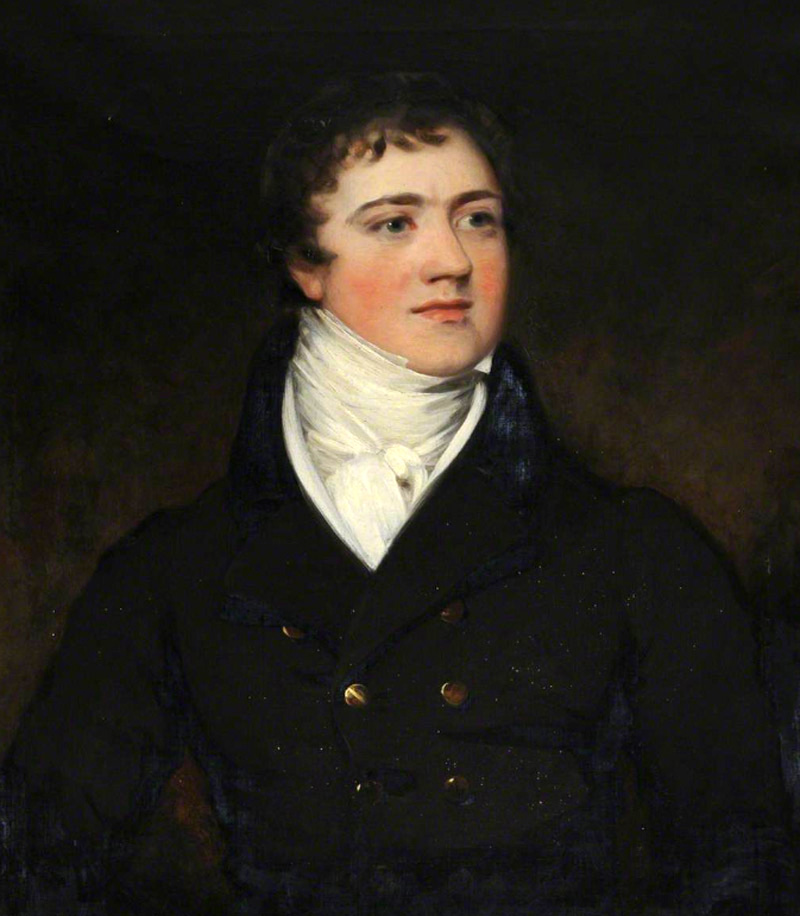
Charles Compton Cavendish, 1st Baron Chesham, who built Latimer House.

Charles Compton Cavendish, 1st Baron Chesham (28 August 1793 – 12 November 1863) was a British Liberal politician.

== Early life ==
Cavendish was the fourth son of George Augustus Henry Cavendish, 1st Earl of Burlington, third son of the former Prime Minister William Cavendish, 4th Duke of Devonshire, and his wife Lady Charlotte Elizabeth Boyle, daughter of the architect Richard Boyle, 3rd Earl of Burlington and 4th Earl of Cork. His mother was Lady Elizabeth Compton, daughter of Charles Compton, 7th Earl of Northampton.

== Career ==
In 1814, at the age of 21, Cavendish was elected Member of Parliament for Aylesbury, a seat he held until 1818, and later sat for Newtown from 1821 to 1830, for Yarmouth (Isle of Wight) from 1831 to 1832, for East Sussex from 1832 to 1841, for Youghal from 1841 to 1847 and for Buckinghamshire from 1847 to 1857. In 1858, he was raised to the peerage as Baron Chesham, of Chesham in the County of Buckingham.

== Personal life ==
Lord Chesham married Lady Catherine Susan Gordon, daughter of George Gordon, 9th Marquess of Huntly, in 1814. Together, they were the parents of three children:

- William George Cavendish, 2nd Baron Chesham
- Hon. Susan Sophia Cavendish, who married Thomas Trevor, 22nd Baron Dacre
- Hon. Harriet Elizabeth Cavendish, who married, as his second wife, George Byng, 2nd Earl of Strafford.

He died in November 1863, aged 70. He was succeeded in the barony by his son William.

== See also ==
- Duke of Devonshire
- Earl of Burlington

== Notes ==
Parliament of the United Kingdom
| Preceded by Thomas Hussey; The Lord Nugent | Member of Parliament for Aylesbury; 1814 – 1818; With: The Lord Nugent | Succeeded by The Lord Nugent; William Rickford |
| Preceded by Dudley Long North; Hudson Gurney | Member of Parliament for Newtown; 1821 – 1830; With: Hudson Gurney | Succeeded by Hudson Gurney; Charles Anderson-Pelham |
| Preceded by William Yates Peel; George Lowther Thompson | Member of Parliament for Yarmouth (Isle of Wight); 1831–1832; With: Sir Henry Pollard Willoughby | Constituency abolished |
| New constituency | Member of Parliament for East Sussex; 1832 – 1841; With: Herbert Barrett Curteis 1832–37; George Darby 1837–41 | Succeeded by George Darby; Augustus Eliott Fuller |
| Preceded by Frederick John Howard | Member of Parliament for Youghal; 1841–1847 | Succeeded by Thomas Chisholm Anstey |
| Preceded by Caledon Du Pré; William Fitzmaurice; Christopher Tower | Member of Parliament for Buckinghamshire; 1847–1857; With: Caledon Du Pré; Benjamin Disraeli | Succeeded by Caledon Du Pré; William Cavendish; Benjamin Disraeli |
Peerage of the United Kingdom
| New creation | Baron Chesham; 1858–1863 | Succeeded by William George Cavendish |
