= Charles Frewen =

English land-owner and Conservative Party politician

Charles Hay Frewen (25 May 1813 – 1 September 1878), known until 1837 as Charles Hay Frewen-Turner, was an English land-owner and Conservative Party politician. He sat in the House of Commons from 1846 to 1857 for East Sussex, and thereafter suffered a series of electoral defeats as he unsuccessfully challenged the political power of the Duke of Rutland in North Leicestershire.

== Early life ==
Frewen was the second son of John Frewen-Turner (1755–1829) of Cold Overton Hall in Leicestershire, who had been the Member of Parliament (MP) for Athlone from 1807 to 1812. His mother was Frewen-Turner's second wife Elizabeth, the heir and only daughter of David Hay from Hopes in Haddingtonshire. He was educated at Trinity College, Cambridge, and became a large landowner in both Leicestershire and Sussex.

Frewen was a magistrate for Leicestershire, Sussex and Kent, and for three other counties. He was High Sheriff of Leicestershire in 1866, a post previously held by his father in 1791.

== Political career ==
Frewen first stood for Parliament at a by-election in March 1839 for Leicester, but was unsuccessful. At the 1841 general election he contested Rye, again without success, but he was elected as an MP for East Sussex at a by-election in February 1846 after the resignation of George Darby, who had been appointed as a Commissioner of Enclosures. Frewen had been reluctant to stand, and when first approached by Darby as a possible protectionist candidate he had offered to donate £500 towards the expenses of another protectionist who would contest the seat. No other candidate came forward, and at the hustings in Lewes Frewen was elected unopposed on 4 February.

He was re-elected for East Sussex in 1847 and 1852, and held the seat until his resignation on 17 February 1857 through appointment as Steward of the Chiltern Hundreds.

He had resigned to contest a by-election in North Leicestershire, where his campaign was based on what The Times newspaper called his "extreme Protestant notions". Although he also raised issues of taxation, his main campaign focus was religion, and his agents' rallying cry was "no Popery!" He opposed the Maynooth Grant of financial assistance for St Patrick's College, a Roman Catholic seminary at Maynooth in Ireland, and distributed more than 20,000 handbills in one week to explain his views. However, the canvassing returns showed that he had little support, and that voters preferred the High Church stance of Lord John Manners, son of the locally powerful Duke of Rutland. In one district where Frewen had expected strong report, the returns showed 319 supporters of Lord John, but only 14 for Frewen; and in the Melton Mowbray district, canvassers identified no-one prepared to vote for Frewen. His agents, who included both Conservatives and Radicals, abandoned the campaign in mid-February when they realised that they could secure less than 200 votes in the whole county, and Manners was elected unopposed.

He did contest North Leicestershire at the general election in April 1857, when he did not win either of the two seats. When Lord John sought re-election in March 1858 after his appointment as First Commissioner of Works, Frewen planned to stand again. He promptly issued an election address, which was published in the local newspapers, but his friends advised him not to proceed with the campaign. He appeared at the hustings on 8 March to explain his withdrawal, and was congratulated by Manners for avoiding "what, in Parliamentary language, would have been a frivolous and vexatious opposition". In a letter published in The Times on 12 March, Frewen struck back, claiming that Manners "would not have the least chance of being returned for any other county in the whole kingdom besides North Leicestershire", because his return had been secured only by "the great territorial influence that has been exerted in his behalf". Frewen claimed that land agents for the Duke of Rutland had been sent to "coerce whole villages", telling tenants farmers to vote for Manners, and that the farmers had obeyed rather than risk eviction. He contended that the 25 counties which had been divided under the Reform Act should have been allocated four seats as one constituency, rather than being split into a pair of two-seat divisions, and that if the two-halves of Leicestershire were combined in one constituency, then no single landowner could dominate the county's elections in this way.

He stood again in North Leicestershire at the general elections in 1859, 1865 and 1868, but without success. At the 1865 election, polling had to be postponed in Ashby-de-la-Zouch when a group of colliers who supported Frewen rioted on 25 July, throwing stones at voters and overturning the carriages of Frewen's opponents. Sixty police officers attended, but despite breaking many heads they were unable to restore order, and the gates of the market hall were closed to further voters. A further 100 police arrived the next day, but polling was stopped after four people voted, since it was agreed that Frewen could not win and continued polling would only provoke his supporters further. The delay caused by the riots meant that the North Leicestershire was the last constituency in England county to declare a result in the election.

At the 1868 election he styled himself not as a Conservative, but as an "Independent Conservative", opposed as before to the Duke of Rutland's power in the constituency. Polling was again disrupted by riots, this time at Shepshed in the north of the county. Polling was taking place in the village's Roman Catholic schoolroom, and Frewen's supporters realised that he was losing, and tried to stop his opponents from voting. Police tried to protect voters, but were driven back into the schoolhouse, where rioters broke all the windows and threw stones at those inside, as well as trying unsuccessfully to seize the polling books. Police reinforcements were sent from Loughborough, but were confronted en route by rioters who stopped the police carriage and attacked the officers with cudgels. The rioters dispersed when a second contingent of police arrived, and voting resumed the following day.

== Family ==
In 1856 he married Frances Brisco, the daughter of Henry Woodgate from Pembury near Tunbridge Wells, and widow of Musgrave Brisco MP.

Parliament of the United Kingdom
Preceded by George Darbyn; Augustus Eliott Fuller	Member of Parliament for East Sussex; 1846–1857; With: Augustus Eliott Fuller	Succeeded by Viscount Pevensey; Augustus Eliott Fuller
