= John McKean (politician) =

Irish politician

John McKean (6 January 1869 – 14 May 1942) was an Irish nationalist politician and Member of Parliament (MP) in the House of Commons of the United Kingdom of Great Britain and Ireland.

He was the son of Patrick MacKean (also Mickan), a shoemaker, and Mary Hanratty.

He was first elected unopposed as the Irish Parliamentary Party (IPP) MP for the South Monaghan constituency at the 1902 South Monaghan by-election, caused by the resignation of James Daly. He was re-elected at the 1906, January 1910 and December 1910 general elections. From 1909, having left the IPP, he sat as an Independent Nationalist MP. He did not contest the 1918 general election.

His brother James J. MacKean was a member of Seanad Éireann from 1922 to 1936.

Parliament of the United Kingdom
Preceded by James Daly	Member of Parliament for South Monaghan; 1902–1918	Succeeded by Seán MacEntee
