= George Darby (MP for East Sussex) =

British Conservative politician

Member of Parliament for East Sussex
- In office 1 August 1837 – 3 February 1846 Serving with Augustus Fuller (1841–1846); Charles Cavendish (1837–1841)
- Preceded by: Charles Cavendish; Herbert Barrett Curteis
- Succeeded by: Augustus Fuller; Charles Frewen

Personal details
- Born: 1798
- Died: 16 November 1872 (aged 73–74)
- Party: Conservative

George Darby (1798 – 16 November 1877) was a British Conservative politician.

He was educated at Westminster School and Catharine Hall, Cambridge.

He was elected Conservative MP for East Sussex at the 1837 general election and held the seat until 1846 when he had to step down after being appointed a Commissioner of Inclosures

He died 16 November 1877 in Piccadilly, London.

Parliament of the United Kingdom
Preceded by Charles Cavendish; Herbert Barrett Curteis	Member of Parliament for East Sussex; 1837–1846; With: Augustus Fuller (1841–1846); Charles Cavendish (1837–1841)	Succeeded by Augustus Fuller; Charles Frewen
