= David Arnott (rugby union) =

Ireland international rugby union player (1855–1915)

- Full name: David Taylor Arnott
- Born: 27 April 1855 Tynemouth, England
- Died: 23 July 1915 (aged 60) Binstead, Isle of Wight

Rugby union career
- Position: Forward
International career
Years	Team	Apps	(Points)
1875	Ireland	1	(0)

David Taylor Arnott (27 April 1855 — 23 July 1915) was an Irish international rugby union player.

Born in Tynemouth, Arnott was the son of Sir John Arnott, 1st Baronet, a Scottish-born businessman who founded the department store Arnotts. He played rugby union in his youth for Dublin club Lansdowne and was capped once for Ireland, as a forward against England in Dublin in 1875.

Arnott was a director of The Irish Times Limited, based in London, and an active philanthropist, founding the "Arnott Medal" (awarded to members of the Irish Medical Association for acts of bravery). He stood unsuccessfully as a Conservative Party candidate for Youghal in the 1880 United Kingdom general election.

In 1915, Arnott died by gunshot at his summer house in the Isle of Wight, having been depressed over the events of World War I. An inquest returned a verdict of "suicide while temporarily insane"

== See also ==
- List of Ireland national rugby union players
