= Youghal (UK Parliament constituency) =

UK parliamentary constituency in Ireland, 1801–1885

- Former borough constituency for the House of Commons
- County: County Cork
- Borough: Youghal

1801–1885
- Seats: 1
- Created from: Youghal (IHC)
- Replaced by: East Cork

Youghal (or Youghall) (Note: The borough is named Youghall in the Parliamentary Boundaries (Ireland) Act 1832 and Youghal in the Redistribution of Seats Act 1885.) was a United Kingdom Parliament constituency in Ireland returning one MP from 1801 to 1885.

== History ==
Youghal was a two-seat constituency in the Irish House of Commons. Under the Acts of Union 1800, which came into effect on 1 January 1801, it was one of the constituencies represented in the House of Commons of the United Kingdom, with its representation reduced to one seat. The member who sat in the First Parliament of the United Kingdom was chosen by lot.

A Topographical Directory of Ireland, published in 1837, describes the parliamentary history of the borough:

The borough appears to have exercised the elective franchise by prescription, as, though no notice of that privilege appears in any of its charters, it continued to send two members to the Irish parliament from the year 1374 until the Union, since which period it has returned one member to the imperial parliament; the right of election was vested solely in the members of the corporation and the freemen, whether resident or not; but by the act of the 2nd of Wm. IV., cap. 88, it has been granted to the £10 householders, and the non-resident freemen have been disfranchised. A new boundary has been drawn round the town, including an area of 212 statute acres.

The borough was disfranchised under the Redistribution of Seats Act 1885, which took effect at the 1885 general election. The area was thereafter represented by the county constituency of East Cork.

Notable MPs included Isaac Butt, who was later leader of the Home Rule League.

== Boundaries ==
This constituency was the parliamentary borough of Youghal in County Cork. A report into the boundaries was undertaken in 1831. The Parliamentary Boundaries (Ireland) Act 1832 defined the boundaries of the parliamentary borough as:

From the Point to the South of the Town where the new Road to Cork quits the Sea-shore, Northward, in a straight Line to the Point in Windmill Lane where the same is joined by a Bye Road from the North, about Two hundred Yards to the West of the House occupied by Mr. Flyn; thence in a straight Line to the South-western Angle of the Ordnance Ground on which the Barracks stand, near the old Cork Road; thence along the Western Fence of the Ordnance Ground to the North-western Angle of the same; thence, Northward in a straight Line to the Spot where the upper Edge of the great Quarry near Counsellor Feuge's House is cut by a Road which runs through the same to the Mount Uniacke Road; thence along the Road so running through the Quarry to the Point where the same meets the Mount Uniacke Road; thence, Northward, in a straight Line to the Point where a Bye Road which leads from the Mount Uniacke Road to the Waterford Road makes a Turn almost at Right Angles a little to the South of the House called Eustace's Folly; thence, Northward, along the same Road, passing to the West of Eustace's Folly, to the Spot where the same Road meets the Waterford Road; thence in a straight Line to the nearest Point of the Sea-shore; thence along the Sea-shore to the Point first described.

== Members of Parliament ==
Election	Member	Party	Note
1801, 1 January	Sir John Keane, Bt	Tory	Created baronet 1 August 1801.
1806, 10 November	James Bernard, Viscount Bernard	Tory	
1807, 18 May	Henry Boyle, Viscount Boyle	Tory	Became the 3rd Earl of Shannon
1807, 28 July	Sir John Keane, Bt	Tory	First returned at a by-election
1818, 27 June	James Bernard, Viscount Bernard	Tory	
1820, 15 March	John Hyde		
1826, 14 June	Hon. George Ponsonby	Whig	Nephew of George Ponsonby (1755–1817)
1832, 15 December	John O'Connell	Repeal	Re-elected as a candidate of a Liberal/Repealer pact
1837, 8 August	Frederick John Howard	Whig	
1841, 3 July	Hon. Charles Cavendish	Whig	
1847, 7 August	Thomas Chisholm Anstey	Irish Confederate	
1852, 15 July	Isaac Butt	Conservative	Re-elected as a Liberal candidate
1857, 28 March	Isaac Butt	Peelite	
1859, 9 May	Isaac Butt	Liberal	
1865, 18 July	Joseph Neale McKenna	Liberal	
1868, 23 November	Christopher Weguelin	Liberal	Unseated on petition and new writ issued
1869, 11 May	Montague Guest	Liberal	Returned at a by-election
1874, 4 February	Sir Joseph Neale McKenna	Home Rule	
1885	constituency abolished		

== Elections ==
=== Elections in the 1830s ===
General election 1830: Youghal
Party	Candidate	Votes	%
Whig	George Ponsonby	66	95.7
Nonpartisan	Richard Smyth	3	4.3
Majority		63	91.4
Turnout		69	c. 28.5
Registered electors		c. 242	
Whig hold			

Ponsonby was appointed as a Lord Commissioner of the Treasury, requiring a by-election.

By-election, 4 December 1830: Youghal
Party	Candidate	Votes	%
Whig	George Ponsonby	Unopposed	
Whig hold			

General election 1831: Youghal
Party	Candidate	Votes	%
Whig	George Ponsonby	Unopposed	
Registered electors		242	
Whig hold			

General election 1832: Youghal
Party	Candidate	Votes	%
Repeal	John O'Connell	22	81.5
Tory	Roger Green Davis	5	18.5
Majority		17	63.0
Turnout		27	9.1
Registered electors		297	
Repeal gain from Whig			

- Davis resigned on the second day of polling

General election 1835: Youghal
Party	Candidate	Votes	%	±%
Repeal (Whig)	John O'Connell	137	51.3	−30.2
Conservative	Thomas Cusack-Smith	130	48.7	+30.2
Majority		7	2.6	−60.4
Turnout		267	79.0	+69.9
Registered electors		338		
Repeal hold		Swing	−30.2	

General election 1837: Youghal
Party	Candidate	Votes	%	±%
Whig	Frederick John Howard	158	51.3	+−0.0
Conservative	William Nicol	150	48.7	±0.0
Majority		8	2.6	N/A
Turnout		308	58.6	−20.4
Registered electors		526		
Whig gain from Repeal		Swing		

=== Elections in the 1840s ===
General election 1841: Youghal
Party	Candidate	Votes	%	±%
Whig	Charles Cavendish	Unopposed		
Registered electors		498		
Whig hold				

General election 1847: Youghal
Party	Candidate	Votes	%	±%
Irish Confederate	Thomas Chisholm Anstey	110	61.8	New
Whig	William Ponsonby	68	38.2	N/A
Majority		42	23.6	N/A
Turnout		178	34.1	N/A
Registered electors		522		
Irish Confederate gain from Whig		Swing	N/A	

=== Elections in the 1850s ===
General election 1852: Youghal
Party	Candidate	Votes	%	±%
Conservative	Isaac Butt	111	50.5	New
Whig	John Fortescue	109	49.5	+11.3
Majority		2	1.0	N/A
Turnout		220	84.3	+50.2
Registered electors		261		
Conservative gain from Irish Confederate		Swing		

General election 1857: Youghal
Party	Candidate	Votes	%	±%
Peelite	Isaac Butt	Unopposed		
Registered electors		220		
Peelite gain from Conservative				

General election 1859: Youghal
Party	Candidate	Votes	%	±%
Liberal	Isaac Butt	128	70.3	N/A
Conservative	John Rowland Smyth	54	29.7	N/A
Majority		74	40.6	N/A
Turnout		182	77.8	N/A
Registered electors		234		
Liberal gain from Peelite		Swing	N/A	

=== Elections in the 1860s ===
General election 1865: Youghal
Party	Candidate	Votes	%	±%
Liberal	Joseph Neale McKenna	122	80.3	N/A
Liberal	Isaac Butt	30	19.7	−50.6
Majority		92	60.6	+20.0
Turnout		152	64.1	−13.7
Registered electors		237		
Liberal hold		Swing	N/A	

General election 1868: Youghal
Party	Candidate	Votes	%	±%
Liberal	Christopher Weguelin	127	54.5	N/A
Liberal	Joseph Neale McKenna	106	45.5	−34.4
Majority		21	9.0	−51.6
Turnout		233	83.8	+19.7
Registered electors		278		
Liberal hold		Swing	N/A	

On petition, Weguelin was unseated due to treating, and a by-election was called.

By-election, 11 May 1869: Youghal
Party	Candidate	Votes	%	±%
Liberal	Montague Guest	126	50.6	N/A
Conservative	Charles Green	123	49.4	New
Majority		3	1.2	−7.8
Turnout		249	89.6	+5.8
Registered electors		278		
Liberal hold		Swing	N/A	

=== Elections in the 1870s ===
General election 1874: Youghal
Party	Candidate	Votes	%	±%
Home Rule	Joseph Neale McKenna	124	53.9	+8.4
Conservative	Robert Penrose-Fitzgerald	106	46.1	N/A
Majority		18	7.8	−1.2
Turnout		230	83.3	−0.5
Registered electors		276		
Home Rule gain from Liberal		Swing	N/A	

=== Elections in the 1880s ===
General election 1880: Youghal
Party	Candidate	Votes	%	±%
Home Rule	Joseph Neale McKenna	133	52.6	−1.3
Conservative	David Taylor Arnott	120	47.4	+1.3
Majority		13	5.2	−2.6
Turnout		253	87.5	+4.2
Registered electors		289		
Home Rule hold		Swing	−1.3	

== Notes and references ==
=== Sources ===
- The Parliaments of England by Henry Stooks Smith (1st edition published in three volumes 1844–50), 2nd edition edited (in one volume) by F.W.S. Craig (Political Reference Publications 1973)
- Walker, Brian M., ed. (1978). Parliamentary Election Results in Ireland, 1801–1922. Dublin: Royal Irish Academy. ISBN 0901714127.
- Leigh Rayment's Historical List of MPs – Constituencies beginning with "Y"
