= East Sussex (constituency) =

Parliamentary constituency in the United Kingdom, 1832–1885

- Former county constituency for the House of Commons
- Context of 1832-1868. Extract from 1837 result: the main, south coast striped area.

1832–1885
- Seats: two
- Created from: Sussex
- Replaced by: Rye; Eastbourne; East Grinstead; Lewes

East Sussex (formally the Eastern division of Sussex) was a parliamentary constituency in the county of Sussex, which returned two Members of Parliament to the House of Commons of the Parliament of the United Kingdom, elected by the bloc vote system.

It was created under the Great Reform Act for the 1832 general election, when the existing Sussex constituency was divided into two. It consisted of the rapes of Lewes, Pevensey and Hastings, an area broadly similar to but not identical with the modern county of East Sussex. The "place of election", where nominations were taken and the result declared, was Lewes.

East Sussex was abolished for the 1885 general election, being divided between four new single-member county constituencies, Rye, Eastbourne, East Grinstead and Lewes. (Lewes and Rye also absorbed the voters from the abolished boroughs of the same names.)

== Boundaries ==
1832–1885: The Rapes of Lewes, Hastings and Pevensey.

== Members of Parliament ==
Year	1st Member	1st Party	2nd Member	2nd Party
1832	Hon. Charles Cavendish	Whig	Herbert Barrett Curteis	Whig
1837	Hon. Charles Cavendish	Whig	George Darby	Conservative
1841	Augustus Fuller	Conservative	George Darby	Conservative
1846 by-election	Augustus Fuller	Conservative	Charles Frewen	Conservative
March 1857 by-election	Augustus Fuller	Conservative	Viscount Pevensey	Conservative
April 1857	John George Dodson	Whig	Viscount Pevensey	Conservative
1859	John George Dodson	Liberal	Viscount Pevensey	Conservative
1865	John George Dodson	Liberal	Lord Edward Cavendish	Liberal
1868	John George Dodson	Liberal	George Gregory	Conservative
1874	Montagu Scott	Conservative	George Gregory	Conservative
1885	constituency abolished			

== Election results ==
=== Elections in the 1830s ===
General election 1832: East Sussex
Party	Candidate	Votes	%
Whig	Charles Cavendish	2,388	47.8
Whig	Herbert Barrett Curteis	1,941	38.8
Tory	George Darby	668	13.4
Majority		1,273	25.4
Turnout		2,753	80.1
Registered electors		3,437	
Whig win (new seat)			
Whig win (new seat)			

General election 1835: East Sussex
Party	Candidate	Votes	%
Whig	Charles Cavendish	Unopposed	
Whig	Herbert Barrett Curteis	Unopposed	
Registered electors		3,811	
Whig hold			
Whig hold			

General election 1837: East Sussex
Party	Candidate	Votes	%
Conservative	George Darby	2,256	30.4
Whig	Charles Cavendish	1,793	24.2
Conservative	Augustus Fuller	1,749	23.6
Whig	Herbert Barrett Curteis	1,619	21.8
Turnout		3,869	80.6
Registered electors		4,799	
Majority		637	8.6
Conservative gain from Whig			
Majority		44	0.6
Whig hold			

=== Elections in the 1840s ===
General election 1841: East Sussex
Party	Candidate	Votes	%	±%
Conservative	George Darby	2,398	41.6	+11.2
Conservative	Augustus Fuller	2,367	41.1	+17.5
Whig	John Shelley	995	17.3	−28.7
Majority		1,372	23.8	N/A
Turnout		c. 3,378	c. 63.1	c. −17.5
Registered electors		5,298		
Conservative hold		Swing	+12.8	
Conservative gain from Whig		Swing	+15.9	

Darby resigned after being appointed a Commissioner of Inclosures, causing a by-election.

By-election, 3 February 1846: East Sussex
Party	Candidate	Votes	%	±%
Conservative	Charles Frewen	Unopposed		
Conservative hold				

General election 1847: East Sussex
Party	Candidate	Votes	%	±%
Conservative	Charles Frewen	Unopposed		
Conservative	Augustus Fuller	Unopposed		
Registered electors		5,723		
Conservative hold				
Conservative hold				

=== Elections in the 1850s ===
General election 1852: East Sussex
Party	Candidate	Votes	%	±%
Conservative	Augustus Fuller	2,155	37.4	N/A
Conservative	Charles Frewen	1,974	34.2	N/A
Whig	John Dodson	1,637	28.4	New
Majority		337	5.8	N/A
Turnout		3,702 (est)	69.9 (est)	N/A
Registered electors		5,298		
Conservative hold		Swing	N/A	
Conservative hold		Swing	N/A	

Frewen resigned by accepting the office of Steward of the Chiltern Hundreds, causing a by-election.

By-election, 7 March 1857: East Sussex
Party	Candidate	Votes	%	±%
Conservative	Henry Holroyd	2,302	50.7	−20.9
Whig	John Dodson	2,234	49.3	+20.9
Majority		68	1.4	−4.4
Turnout		4,536	74.2	+4.3
Registered electors		6,114		
Conservative hold		Swing	−20.9	

General election 1857: East Sussex
Party	Candidate	Votes	%	±%
Whig	John Dodson	2,524	26.6	+12.4
Conservative	Henry Holroyd	2,447	25.8	−8.4
Whig	William Henry Frederick Cavendish	2,286	24.1	+9.9
Conservative	Augustus Fuller	2,216	23.4	−14.0
Turnout		4,737 (est)	77.5 (est)	+7.6
Registered electors		6,114		
Majority		308	3.2	N/A
Whig gain from Conservative		Swing	+11.8	
Majority		161	1.7	−4.1
Conservative hold		Swing	−9.8	

General election 1859: East Sussex
Party	Candidate	Votes	%	±%
Liberal	John Dodson	Unopposed		
Conservative	Henry Holroyd	Unopposed		
Registered electors		6,401		
Liberal hold				
Conservative hold				

=== Elections in the 1860s ===
General election 1865: East Sussex
Party	Candidate	Votes	%	±%
Liberal	John Dodson	2,821	27.5	N/A
Liberal	Edward Cavendish	2,647	25.8	N/A
Conservative	Walter Burrell	2,463	24.0	N/A
Conservative	Reginald Abbot, 3rd Baron Colchester	2,316	22.6	N/A
Majority		184	1.8	N/A
Turnout		5,124 (est)	76.8 (est)	N/A
Registered electors		6,670		
Liberal hold		Swing	N/A	
Liberal gain from Conservative		Swing	N/A	

General election 1868: East Sussex
Party	Candidate	Votes	%	±%
Liberal	John Dodson	3,611	25.4	−2.1
Conservative	George Gregory	3,581	25.2	+1.2
Conservative	Montagu Scott	3,560	25.0	+2.4
Liberal	Edward Cavendish	3,470	24.4	−1.4
Turnout		7,111 (est)	75.8 (est)	−1.0
Registered electors		9,380		
Majority		30	0.2	−1.6
Liberal hold		Swing	−2.0	
Majority		111	0.8	N/A
Conservative gain from Liberal		Swing	+1.5	

=== Elections in the 1870s ===
General election 1874: East Sussex
Party	Candidate	Votes	%	±%
Conservative	George Gregory	Unopposed		
Conservative	Montagu Scott	Unopposed		
Registered electors		10,141		
Conservative hold				
Conservative hold				

=== Elections in the 1880s ===
General election 1880: East Sussex
Party	Candidate	Votes	%	±%
Conservative	George Gregory	4,526	30.6	N/A
Conservative	Montagu Scott	4,396	29.8	N/A
Liberal	Alexander Donovan	2,982	20.2	New
Liberal	John Pearson	2,863	19.4	New
Majority		1,414	9.6	N/A
Turnout		7,384 (est)	72.3 (est)	N/A
Registered electors		10,214		
Conservative hold				
Conservative hold				
