= John George Dodson, 1st Baron Monk Bretton =

British politician (1825–1897)

The Right Honourable The Lord Monk Bretton PC
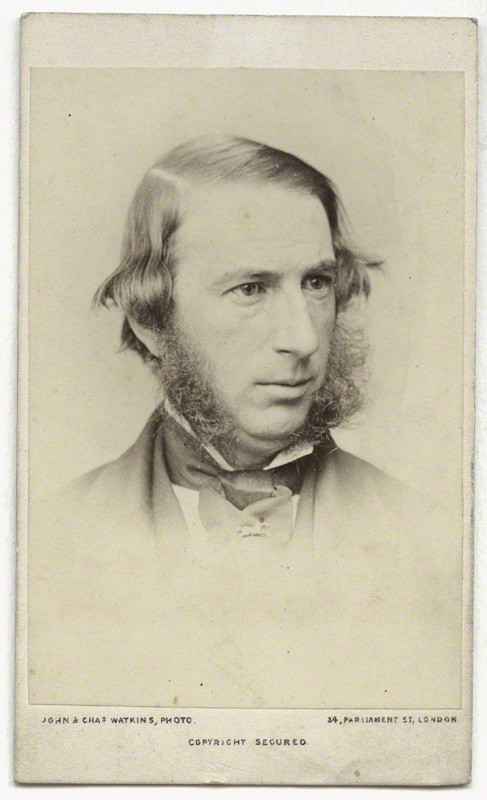
- John George Dodson in 1865, as the newly elected Chairman of Ways and Means.

Deputy Speaker of the House of Commons Chairman of Ways and Means
- In office February 1865 – April 1872
- Monarch: Victoria
- Preceded by: William George Massey
- Succeeded by: John Bonham-Carter

President of the Local Government Board
- In office 3 May 1880 – 28 December 1882
- Monarch: Victoria
- Prime Minister: William Ewart Gladstone
- Preceded by: George Sclater-Booth
- Succeeded by: Sir Charles Dilke, Bt

Chancellor of the Duchy of Lancaster
- In office 28 December 1882 – 29 October 1884
- Monarch: Victoria
- Prime Minister: William Ewart Gladstone
- Preceded by: The Earl of Kimberley
- Succeeded by: George Trevelyan

Personal details
- Born: 18 October 1825
- Died: 25 May 1897 (aged 71)
- Party: Liberal; Liberal Unionist
- Spouse: Florence Campion
- Education: Christ Church, Oxford

John George Dodson, 1st Baron Monk Bretton, PC (18 October 1825 – 25 May 1897), known before 1884 as John George Dodson, was a British Liberal politician. He was Chairman of Ways and Means (Deputy Speaker of the House of Commons) between 1865 and 1872 and later held office under William Ewart Gladstone as Financial Secretary to the Treasury, President of the Local Government Board and Chancellor of the Duchy of Lancaster. In 1884 he was elevated to the peerage as Baron Monk Bretton.

== Background and education ==
Dodson was the only son of Sir John Dodson, a judge and Dean of the Arches of St George's Hanover Square Church, London. His mother was Frances Priscilla, daughter of George Pearson, MD, FRS. He was educated at Eton (1837–1842), where he won HRH the Prince Consort's Prize for French and Italian in 1842, and came second for French and German in 1841 and 1842, and was later a Fellow (1876–1880). He matriculated at Christ Church, Oxford on 9 June 1843, (BA 1847, MA 1851), got a First, and was called to the Bar, Lincoln's Inn, in 1853. His exact contemporaries at Eton included William George Mount and the Earl of Kimberley.

== Political career ==
Dodson unsuccessfully contested East Sussex in 1852 (he came third with 1637 votes, behind Augustus Eliott Fuller with 2155 and Charles Hay Frewen with 1974) and March 1857, but was elected for the constituency in April 1857. He would hold this seat until 1874. He served as Chairman of Ways and Means (Deputy Speaker of the House of Commons) from February 1865 to April 1872 and was admitted to the Privy Council in 1872.

In 1873 he was appointed Financial Secretary to the Treasury in the Liberal administration of William Ewart Gladstone, a post he held until the government fell the following year. In 1874 Dodson was elected to parliament for Chester, and served as Chairman of the Public Accounts Committee from 1874 to 1876.

In 1880 he was again elected for Chester and appointed President of the Local Government Board, with a seat in the cabinet, in Gladstone's second administration. According to the rules at the time, he was then forced to contest his constituency again. Dodson was duly elected, but shortly after the original election was declared void on petition. This caused him to seek re-election for another constituency. In July he was returned for Scarborough, a seat he would hold until 1884.

Dodson remained President of the Local Government Board until 1882, and then served as Chancellor of the Duchy of Lancaster from 1882 to 1884. On 4 November 1884 he was raised to the peerage as Baron Monk Bretton, of Conyboro and Hurstpierpoint in the County of Sussex. Lord Monk Bretton later disagreed with Gladstone over Home Rule.

He was also active in local politics, and served as the first Chairman of the East Sussex County Council from 1889 to 1892. He was a long serving director and trustee of the Rock Life Assurance Company and a director of Brill's Brighton Baths Company. He was a member of the university, Reform, and Brooks's Clubs. Late in life he became concerned about the fate of the African elephant, whose salvation he mooted, in letters to The Times, could come through domestication.

== Family ==
Lord Monk Bretton married Caroline-Florence, second daughter of William John Campion of Danny, Hurstpierpoint, Sussex, by Harriet Kemp (daughter of Thomas Read Kemp) in 1856. They had one son and three daughters. They lived at 6, Seamore Place in Mayfair, and at Conyboro', near Lewes, Sussex. In 1878 Edward Walford described Seamore Place as follows: "Seamore Place is the name of a row of handsome but somewhat old-fashioned mansions, which occupy a sort of cul de sac at the western end of Curzon Street. They are only nine in number, and their chief fronts look westward over Hyde Park". Lord Monk Bretton died in May 1897, aged 71, and was succeeded in the barony by his only son John William Dodson.

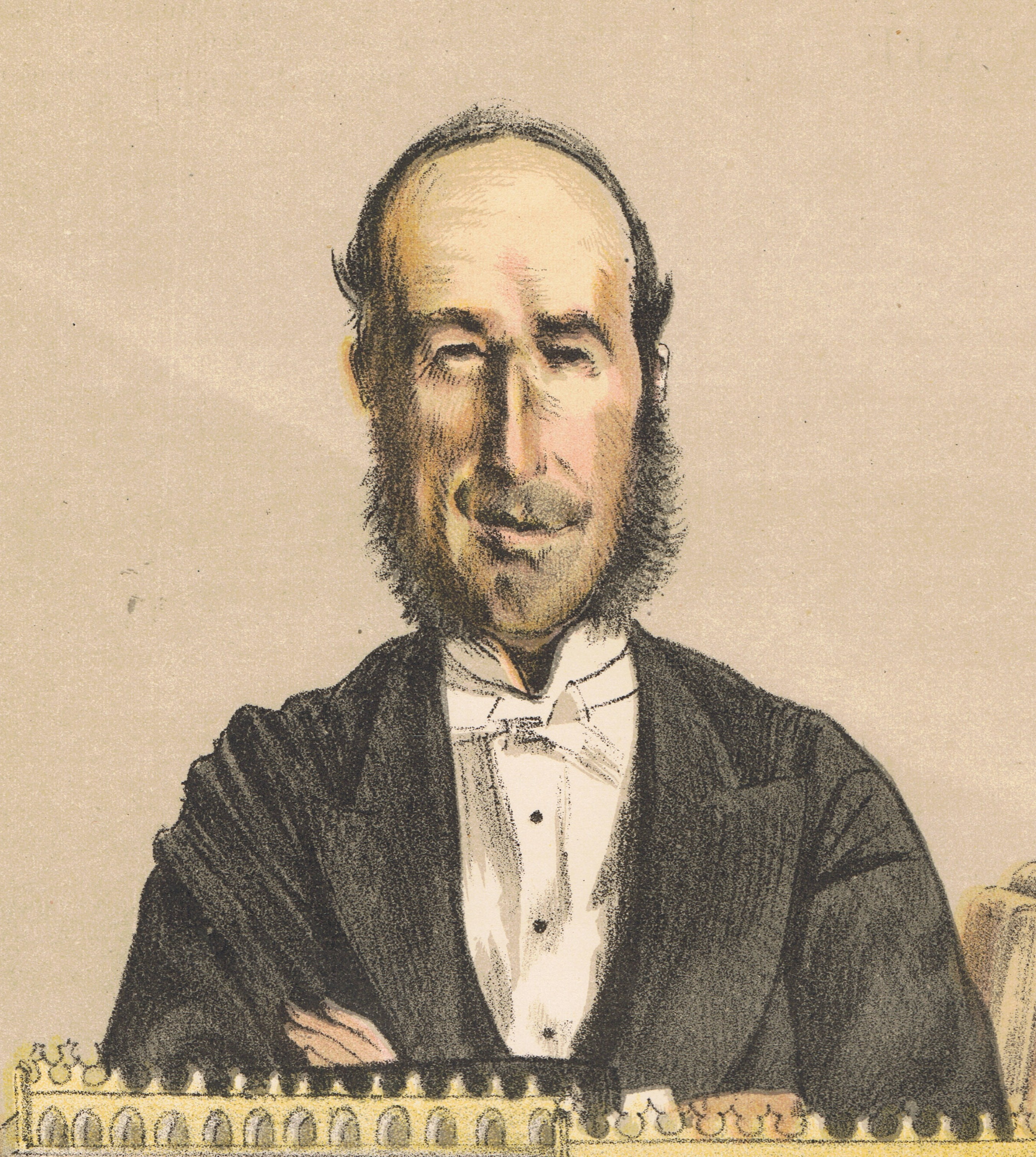
John George Dodson, detail of the lithographic reproduction, after James Tissot, published in Vanity Fair, 16 December 1871.

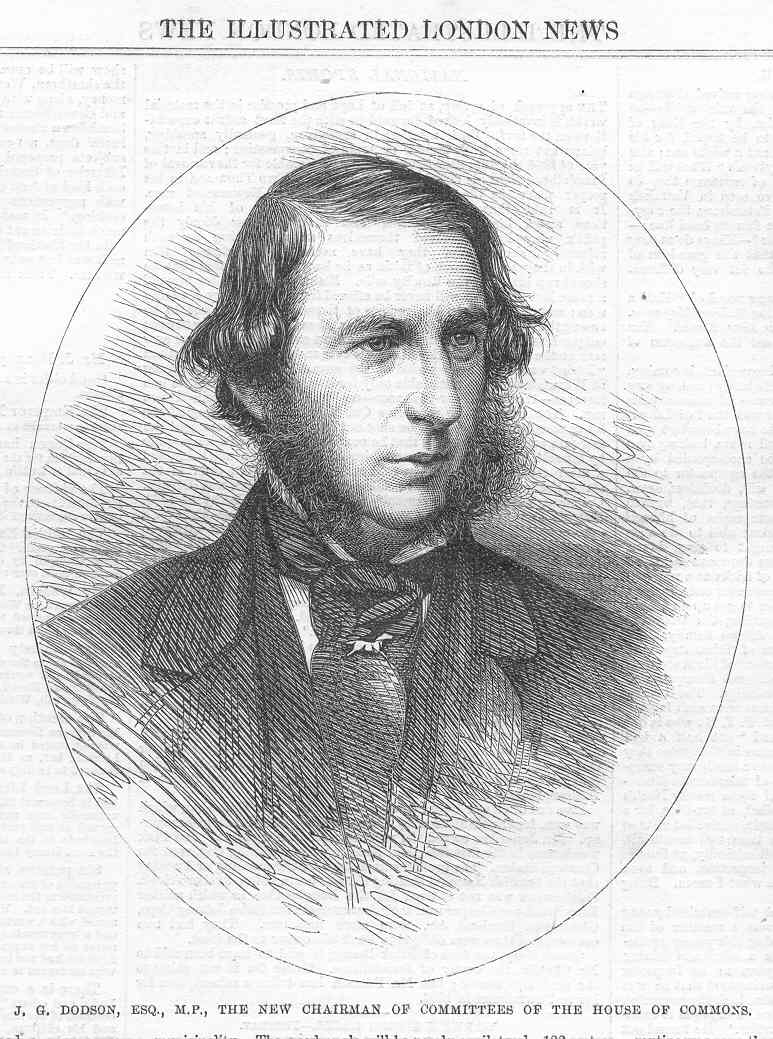
J. G. Dodson, MP, in the Illustrated London News, 1865.

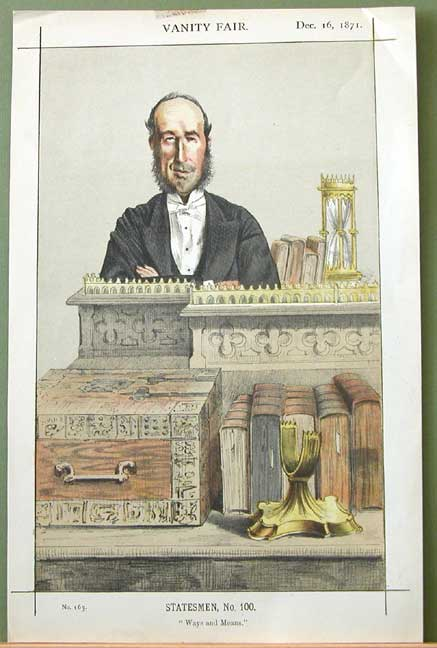
Lithographic reproduction, after James Tissot, published in Vanity Fair, 16 December 1871.

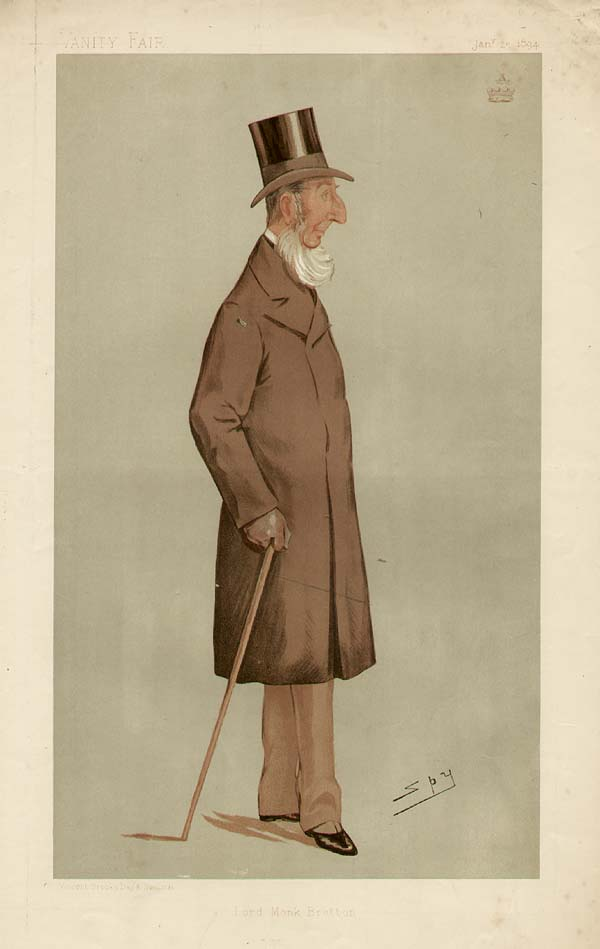
Lithographic reproduction, after Leslie Ward, published in Vanity Fair, 25 January 1894.

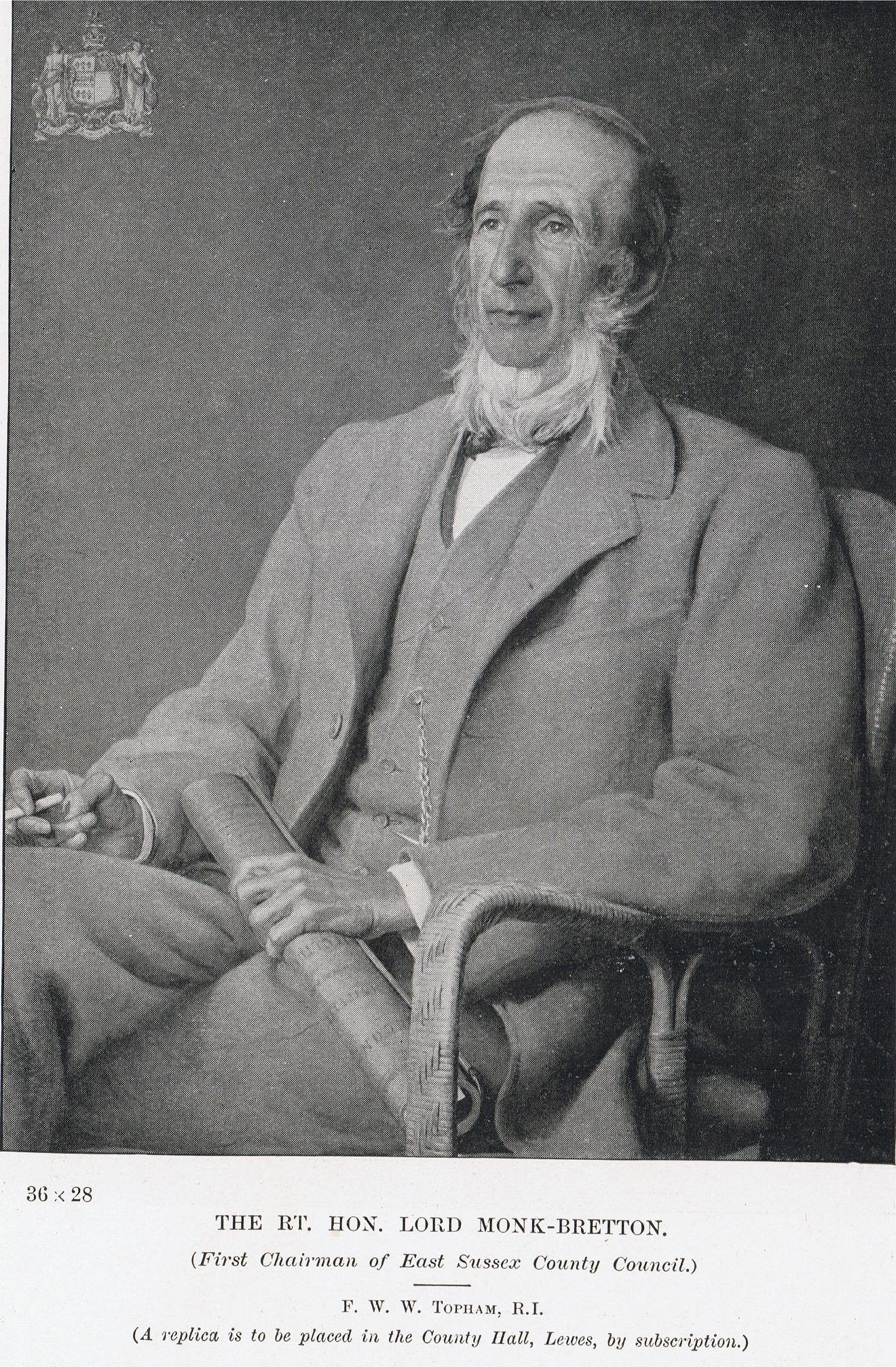
Print after a portrait by Francis William Topham

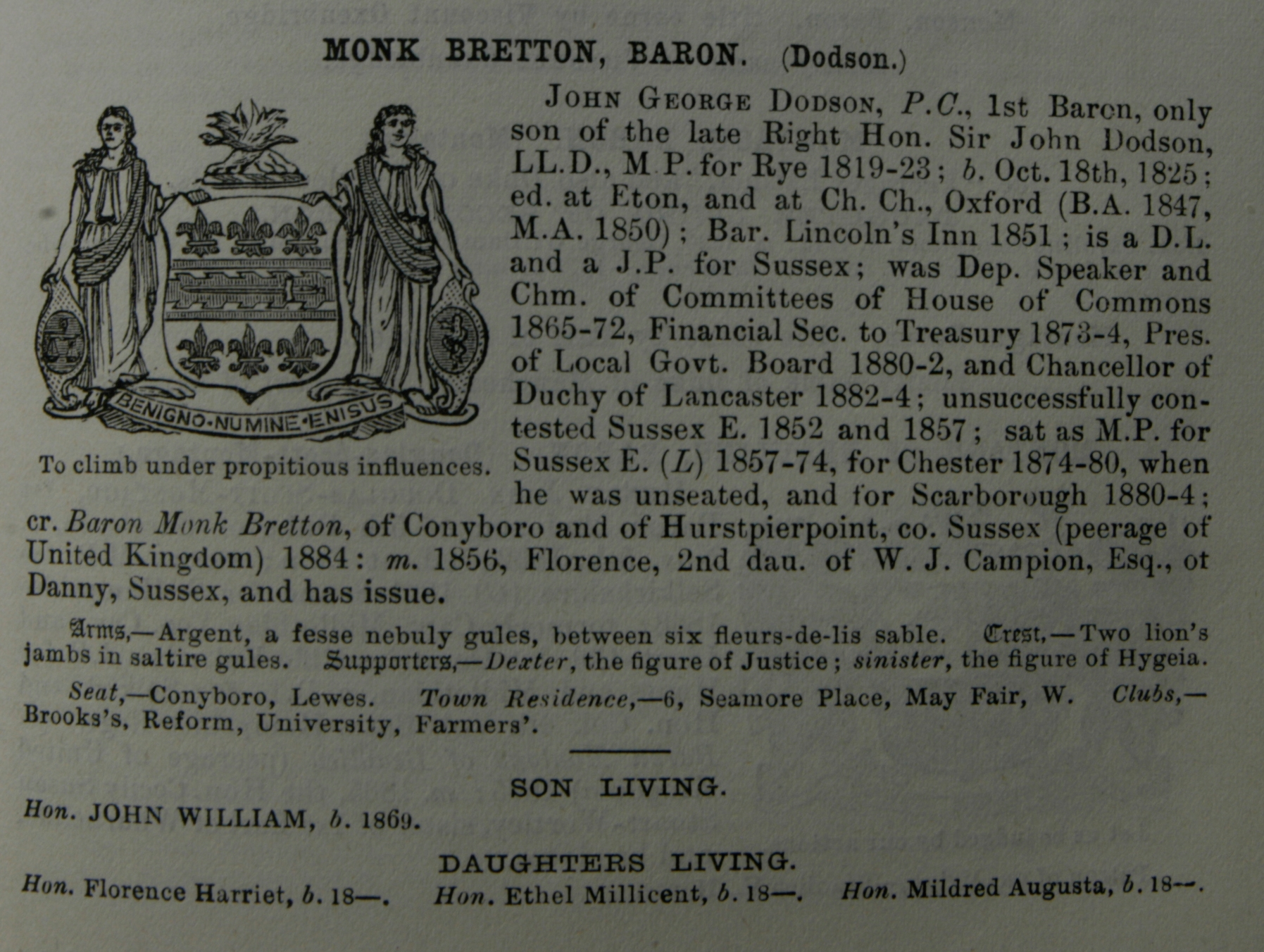
Lord Monk Bretton as described by Debrett's Peerage, London, 1888.

== Arms ==
Coat of arms of John George Dodson, 1st Baron Monk Bretton
Crest Argent, on a fesse raguly plain cotised between six fleurs-de-lis all gules, a sword fesseways point to the dexter proper, pommel and hilt or. Escutcheon Two lion’s jambs erased and in saltire gules, entwined by a serpent, head to the dexter proper. Supporters On either side a female figure proper, vested argent, mantle azure, each resting the exterior hand on an antique shield also azure, adorned gold, that on the dexter charged with a balance suspended, and that on the sinister, with a staff erect entwined by a serpent all or. Motto Benigno Numine Enisus (Successful by favour of Providence)

Parliament of the United Kingdom
Preceded by Augustus Elliot Fuller; Viscount Pevensey	Member of Parliament for East Sussex; 1857–1874; With: Viscount Pevensey 1857–1865, Lord Edward Cavendish 1865–1868, George Gregory 1868–1874	Succeeded by George Gregory; Montagu Scott
Preceded by Henry Cecil Raikes; Norman Grosvenor	Member of Parliament for Chester; 1874–1880; With: Henry Cecil Raikes	Succeeded by Henry Cecil Raikes; Hon. Beilby Lawley
Preceded by Sir Harcourt Johnstone, Bt; William Sproston Caine	Member of Parliament for Scarborough; 1880–1884; With: William Sproston Caine	Succeeded by William Sproston Caine; Richard Steble
Preceded by William George Massey	Chairman of Ways and Means; 1865–1872	Succeeded by John Bonham-Carter
Political offices
Preceded by William Edward Baxter	Financial Secretary to the Treasury; 1873–1874	Succeeded by W. H. Smith
Preceded by George Sclater-Booth	President of the Local Government Board; 1880–1882	Succeeded by Sir Charles Dilke, Bt
Preceded by The Earl of Kimberley	Chancellor of the Duchy of Lancaster; 1882–1884	Succeeded by George Trevelyan
Peerage of the United Kingdom
New creation	Baron Monk Bretton; 1884–1897	Succeeded by John William Dodson
