= George Gregory (Sussex MP) =

English lawyer and politician (1813-1892)

George Burrow Gregory
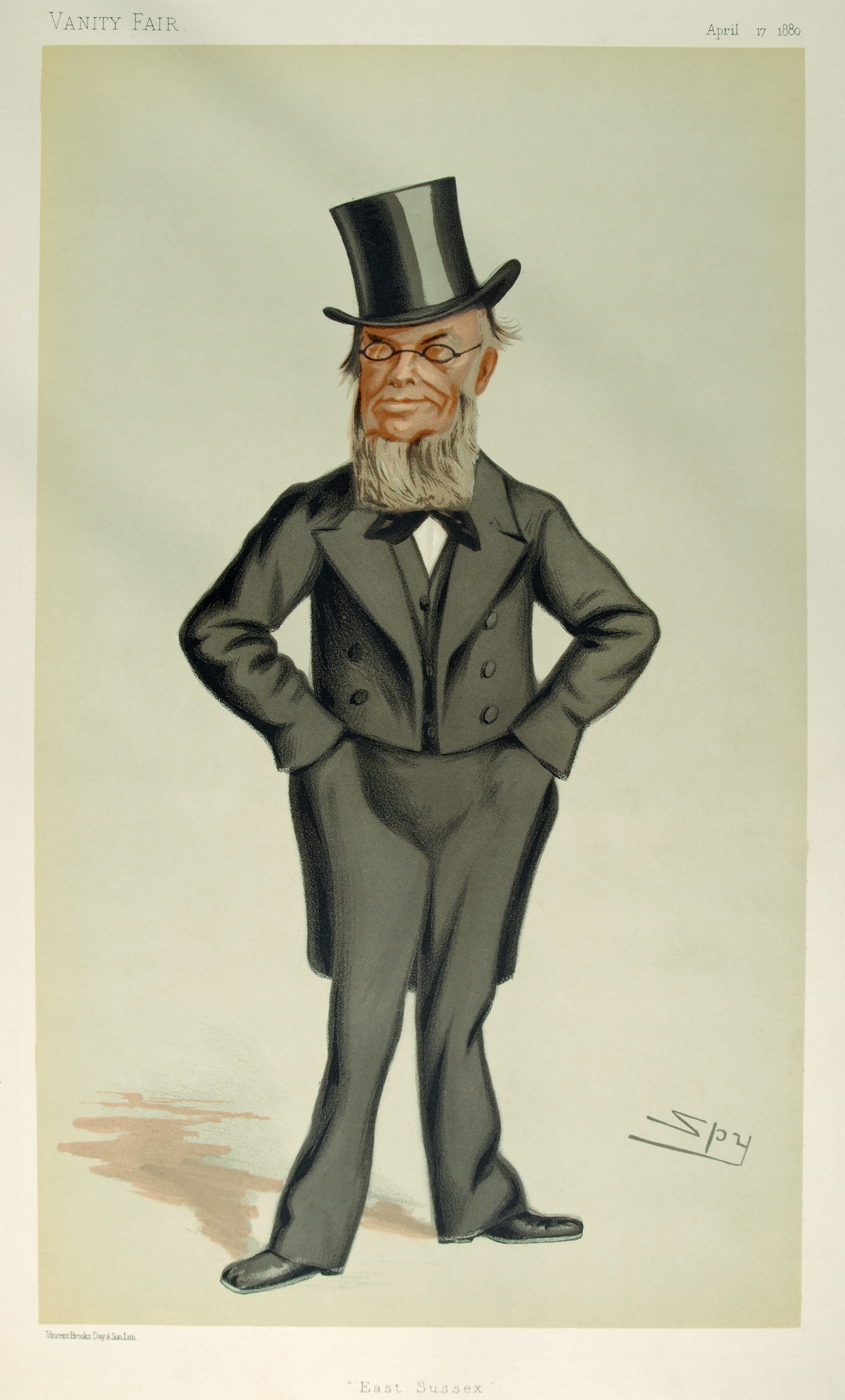
- As depicted by "Spy" (Leslie Ward) in Vanity Fair, April 1880

Member of Parliament for East Sussex
- In office 1868–1885 Serving with John Dodson (1868-1874); Montagu Scott (1874-1885)
- Preceded by: John Dodson; Lord Edward Cavendish
- Succeeded by: Constituency abolished

Member of Parliament for East Grinstead
- In office 1885–1886
- Preceded by: New constituency
- Succeeded by: Alfred Gathorne-Hardy

Personal details
- Born: 29 January 1813
- Died: 5 March 1892 (aged 79)
- Party: Conservative
- Spouse: Maria Teresa Price (m. 1847)
- Education: Eton College
- Alma mater: Trinity College, Cambridge

George Burrow Gregory (29 January 1813 – 5 March 1892) was an English lawyer and Conservative politician.

== Life and politics ==
Gregory was the son of John Swarbreck Gregory, a lawyer who was a member of the first council of the Law Society. He was educated at Eton and at Trinity College, Cambridge. He became a partner in firm of Gregory, Rowcliffe, Rowcliffe, and Rawle, solicitors and was treasurer of Foundling Hospital from 1857 to 1892.

In 1868 Gregory was elected Member of Parliament for East Sussex until it was replaced under the Redistribution of Seats Act 1885. He was then elected MP for East Grinstead and held the seat for a year until 1886.

Burrow died at the age of 79.

Burrow married Maria Teresa Price in 1847.

Parliament of the United Kingdom
Preceded by John Dodson; Lord Edward Cavendish	Member of Parliament for East Sussex; 1868 – 1885; With: John Dodson to 1874; Montagu Scott from 1874	constituency abolished
New constituency	Member of Parliament for East Grinstead; 1885 – 1886	Succeeded by Alfred Gathorne-Hardy
