= 1869 Youghal by-election =

UK Parliamentary by-election

The 1869 Youghal by-election was fought on 11 May 1869. The by-election was fought due to the election of the Liberal incumbent MP, Christopher Weguelin, being voided due to bribery. Weguelin had won the seat in the 1868 general election.

It was won by another Liberal candidate Montague John Guest.
