= Joseph Neale McKenna =

Irish banker and politician

Sir Joseph Neale McKenna (1819 – 15 August 1906) was an Irish banker and politician whose career extended from the elite home rule politics of the mid-nineteenth century to the fall of Charles Stewart Parnell, whom he supported in later years.

He was a Member of Parliament (MP) for Youghal from 1865 to 1868 and for South Monaghan from 1885 to 1892, representing the Home Rule League and its successor the Irish Parliamentary Party from 1874 to 1885 in the House of Commons of the United Kingdom of Great Britain and Ireland. He was an early participant in the Home Rule movement, led by Isaac Butt, and played a leading role in forming Irish Nationalist thinking on the over-taxation of Ireland. He was knighted in 1867, and was a magistrate and Deputy Lieutenant for County Cork and a magistrate in County Waterford.

A Catholic, he was born in Dublin, the son of Michael McKenna, and educated at Trinity College Dublin. In 1842 he married Esther Louise Howe of Dublin, and after her death married Amelia, widow of R. W. Hole. He was called to the Irish bar in 1849. He was an able financier, was chairman of the National Bank of Ireland and became wealthy.

He entered Parliament as member for Youghal, Co. Cork, at the general election of 1865, defeating the incumbent Isaac Butt, the later Home Rule leader, by 122 to 30 votes, the electorate being a tiny 237. Both stood as Liberals. McKenna lost the seat to Christopher Weguelin, also a Liberal, in 1868 by 127 votes to 106, and accepted defeat although Weguelin's election was declared void on account of bribery (which was a viable tactic with such a small electorate).

McKenna joined the Home Government Association in September 1873. He attended the founding conference of the Home Rule League in Dublin on 18–21 November 1873 and moved one of the resolutions. In 1874 McKenna stood as a Home Rule candidate at Youghal and regained the seat. He also defeated a renewed Conservative challenge in 1880.

McKenna worked closely with Isaac Butt and took part in parliamentary obstruction with the more radical Irish members including Joseph Biggar. But in the vital vote of 17 May 1880 in which Parnell displaced William Shaw as chairman of the Irish Parliamentary Party, McKenna voted for Shaw.

The 1885 general election was fought on new boundaries with a greatly enlarged electorate. McKenna had insufficient support to stand in the new East Cork constituency into which Youghal was absorbed, and moved to South Monaghan, where he defeated a Conservative by nearly five to one in 1885 and a Unionist by a similar margin in 1886.

When the Irish Parliamentary Party split in December 1890 over Parnell's leadership, McKenna joined the Parnellite minority which supported Parnell. He was one of only two MPs who had opposed Parnell's takeover in the vote of May 1880 who supported Parnell in the split of 1890, the other being Richard Power.

McKenna retired at the subsequent general election in 1892, being then well over 70.

== Publications ==
- Speech of Joseph Neale McKenna Esq., M.P., to his Constituents at Youghal Court House, 21 September 1866, London, Keating & Co., 1866
- Sir J. N. McKenna’s Statement to the Shareholders of the National Bank, London, printed for private circulation, 1869
- The National Bank: A Case with Proofs, London, Wertheimer, Lea, 1870
- The incidence of imperial taxation on Ireland: a speech delivered at the Rotunda, Dublin, on Tuesday 2 November 1875, Dublin, Irish Home Rule League, 1876
- Imperial taxation: the case of Ireland plainly stated for the information of the English people and of those others whom it may concern, London, Rivingtons, Waterloo Place, 1883
- The Irish Land Question. Where the funds for its solution are to be found etc. London, W. Ridgway, 1887
- Silver, the burning question of the century. An analysis and exposition of it. London, Chapman and Hall, 1894

== Sources ==
- T. P. O’Connor, The Parnell Movement, London, Kegan, Paul, Trench & Co., 1886
- The Times (London), 27 November 1885, 17 August 1906
- David Thornley, Isaac Butt and Home Rule, London, Macgibbon & Kee, 1964
- Brian M. Walker (ed.), Parliamentary Election Results in Ireland, 1801-1922, Dublin, Royal Irish Academy, 1978
- Who Was Who, 1897-1916

Parliament of the United Kingdom
Preceded by Isaac Butt	Member of Parliament for Youghal; 1865–1868	Succeeded by Christopher Weguelin
Preceded by Montague John Guest	Member of Parliament for Youghal; 1874–1885	Constituency abolished
New constituency	Member of Parliament for South Monaghan; 1885–1892	Succeeded by Florence O'Driscoll
