= Montague Guest =

British politician

Montague John Guest
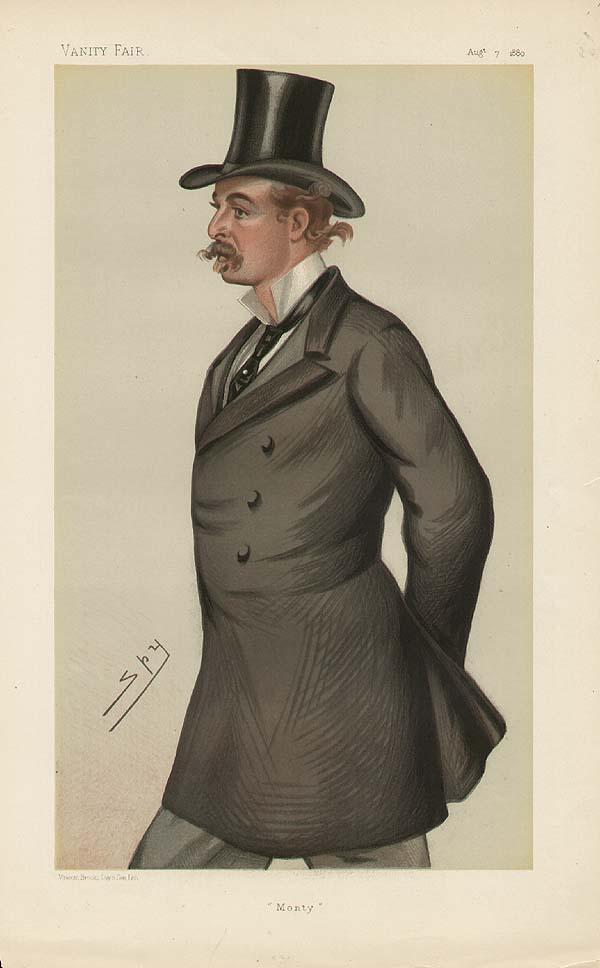
- "Monty". Caricature by Spy published in Vanity Fair in 1880.

Member of Parliament for Youghal
- In office 11 May 1869 – 31 January 1874
- Preceded by: Christopher Weguelin
- Succeeded by: Sir Joseph Neale McKenna

Member of Parliament for Wareham
- In office 31 March 1880 – 24 November 1885
- Preceded by: John Erle-Drax
- Succeeded by: Constituency abolished

Personal details
- Born: 29 March 1839
- Died: 9 November 1909 (aged 70)
- Party: Liberal
- Parent(s): Sir John Josiah Guest, 1st Baronet; Lady Charlotte Bertie

Montague John Guest (29 March 1839 – 9 November 1909), was a British Liberal politician.

== Family ==
A member of the prominent Guest family, he was the third son of Sir John Josiah Guest, 1st Baronet, and his second wife Lady Charlotte, daughter of Albemarle Bertie, 9th Earl of Lindsey. Ivor Guest, 1st Baron Wimborne, was his elder brother, while Ivor Guest, 1st Viscount Wimborne, Frederick Edward Guest, Henry Guest and Oscar Guest were his nephews.

Guest died in November 1909, aged 70. He never married.

== Career ==
He entered Parliament for Youghal in a 1869 by-election, a seat he held until 1874, and later represented Wareham from 1880 to 1885.

Guest was associated with freemasonry from 1867, and served as Provincial Grand Master of Dorset Freemasons until he resigned in 1902. He was elected chairman of White's for the year 1905.

== Yachting ==
He was librarian of the Royal Yacht Squadron, and wrote Memorials of the Royal Yacht Squadron in 1902. As a member he registered 5 yachts

1. Lark, cutter, 63
2. Bacchante, cutter, 80
3. Ballerina, schooner, 132
4. Susan, cutter, 68
5. Lilith, cutter, 44

Parliament of the United Kingdom
Preceded by Christopher Weguelin	Member of Parliament for Youghal; 1869–1874	Succeeded by Sir Joseph Neale McKenna
Preceded by John Erle-Drax	Member of Parliament for Wareham; 1880–1885	Constituency abolished
