= Montagu Scott =

English politician

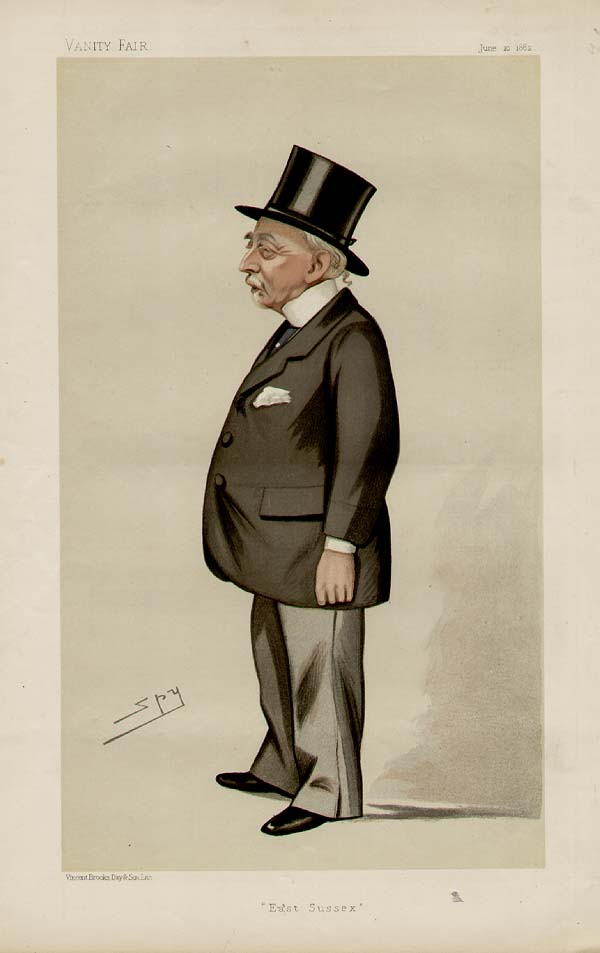
"East Sussex" Scott as caricatured by Spy (Leslie Ward) in Vanity Fair, June 1882

Montagu David Scott (15 March 1818 – 15 January 1900) was an English Conservative Party politician who sat in the House of Commons from 1874 to 1885.

Scott was the son of Sir David Scott, 2nd Baronet and his wife Caroline Grindall daughter of Benjamin Grindall. He was educated at University College, Oxford and was called to the bar at Middle Temple in 1840. He was a J.P. for Sussex and Middlesex, and a Deputy Lieutenant for Sussex.

He was elected at the 1874 general election as one of the two Members of Parliament (MPs) for East Sussex. He was re-elected in 1880, and held the seat until the constituency was divided at the 1885 general election.

Scott died at the age of 81.

Scott married Margaret Briggs, daughter of James Briggs of Oatlands Hertfordshire.

Parliament of the United Kingdom
Preceded by George Gregory; John Dodson	Member of Parliament for East Sussex; 1874 – 1885; With: George Gregory	Constituency abolished
