= John Dodson =

John Dodson may refer to:

- Sir John Dodson (judge) (1780–1858), English MP and Dean of the Arches
- John George Dodson, 1st Baron Monk Bretton (1825–1897), British Liberal MP, son of the above
- John Dodson, 2nd Baron Monk Bretton (1869–1933), British diplomat, son of the above
- John Dillingham Dodson (1879–1955), American psychologist, co-authored Yerkes–Dodson Law
- John Dodson, 3rd Baron Monk Bretton (1924–2022), English agriculturist and landowner, son of the 2nd Baron
- Johnny Dodson (1931–2004), American NASCAR racer, competitor in 1956 Southern 500
- John Dodson (fighter) (born 1984), American mixed martial artist

== See also ==
- John Dodson Stiles (1822–1896), American congressman from Pennsylvania
