= John Maberly =

- Born: 14 July 1770
- Died: 6 October 1839 (aged 69)

John Maberly (14 July 1770 – 6 October 1839) was a British businessman and Member of Parliament.

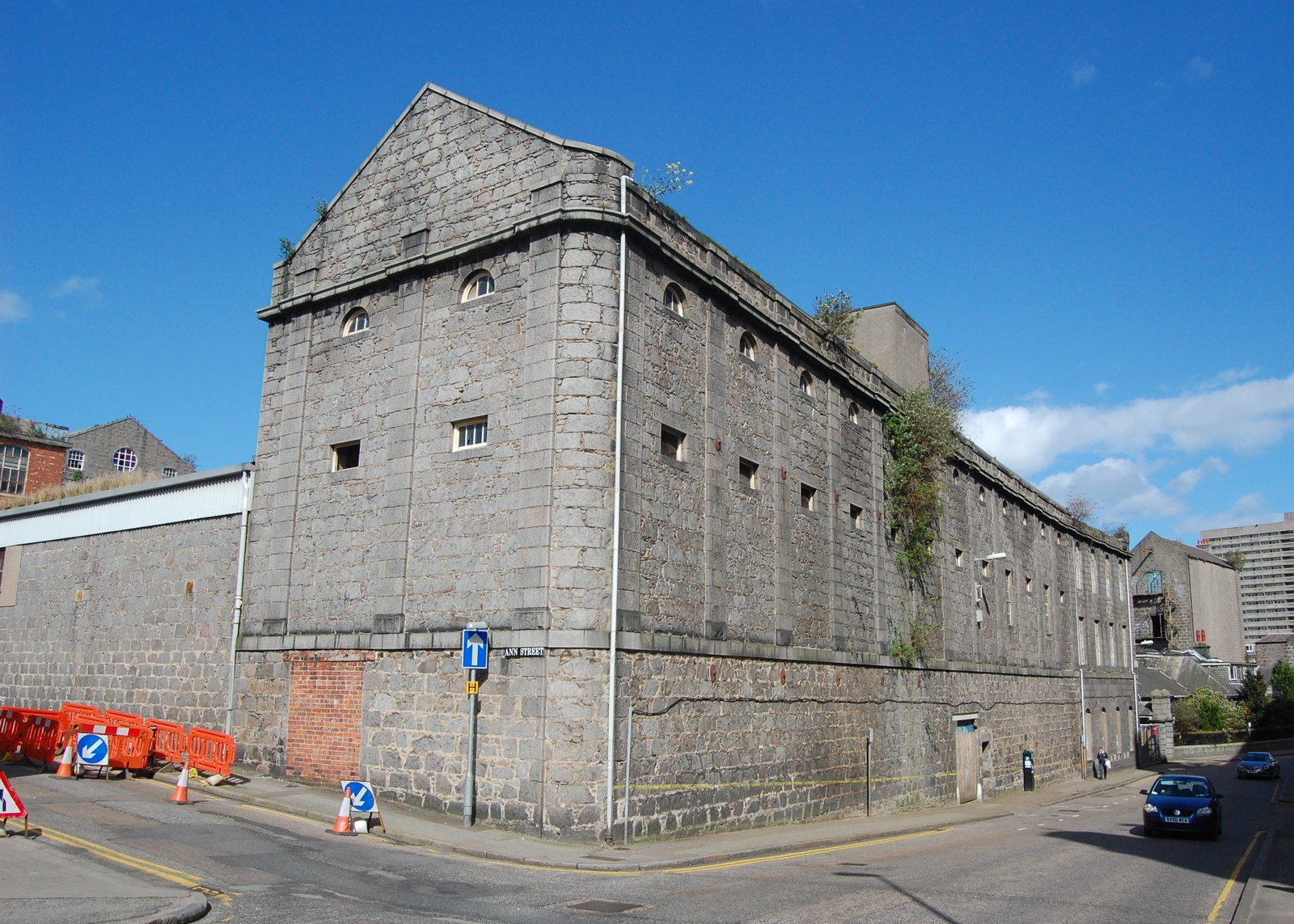
Broadford Works, Aberdeen

John Maberly was born in London in 1770, the second child of London currier (leather finisher) Stephen Maberly and Mary (née Boot) Maberly. In 1796 he married Mary Rose Leader, the sister of William Leader, with whom he was to have six children. After originally joining his father in the family business, a large legacy in 1798 from his father-in-law enabled him to branch out on his own as a very successful military contractor, supplying uniforms to the Army. In 1811 he purchased the large Broadford linen works in Aberdeen. Around this time he also formed an alliance with steam engine pioneer Jabez Carter Hornblower, who had designed an improved steam engine. Sued by James Watt and Matthew Boulton for breach of Watt's extensive patents, their business soon foundered.

In 1813 he remarried, this time to Anne Baillie, with whom he had a further five children.

In May 1816 he was elected to the House of Commons of the United Kingdom as MP for the Tory-sponsored seat of Rye. He subsequently returned as MP for Abingdon, Berkshire, in 1818, 1820, 1826, 1830 and 1831. His growing fortune enabled him to acquire a country estate at Shirley Park in Croydon, Surrey and a large London town house, St John's Lodge, in Regent's Park (1826). He became an enthusiastic huntsman: the Old Surrey Foxhounds, of which he was Master for eight years (1812–20), were kennelled at Shirley.

He was a liveryman of the Worshipful Company of Curriers of the City of London, of which he was Master in 1817.

Introduced into banking circles by the marriage of his daughter Jane to George Robert Smith, a member of the Smith banking family, he decided to start up his own bank in Scotland, where banking was somewhat inefficient and expensive. He formed in 1818 the Exchange and Deposit Bank, based in Edinburgh, and offered cut price banking. Successful at first, by 1832 this business had also foundered as a result of a price war with the other Scottish banks and some large bad overseas debts. The Broadford factory and Shirley Manor had to be sold and he was forced into bankruptcy, thereby having to relinquish his parliamentary seat. He moved to Amiens, France, where he founded a large flax spinning mill in 1838, before he died on 6 October 1839.

His funerary column in Amiens has the following inscription: 'Sacred to the Memory / of John MABERLY esquire / Formerly Member of Parliament / for the Borough of Abingdon / Born July the 14 1770 / Died at Amiens October the 6 1839.

His eldest son, William Leader Maberly, became Joint-Secretary of the General Post Office.

He is remembered by Rue Maberly, Amiens and Maberly Street, Aberdeen.

Parliament of the United Kingdom
Preceded by Thomas Phillipps Lamb; Richard Arkwright	Member of Parliament for Rye; 1816 – 1818; With: Richard Arkwright	Succeeded by Peter Browne; Charles Arbuthnot
Preceded by Sir George Bowyer	Member of Parliament for Abingdon; 1818 – 1832	Succeeded by Thomas Duffield
