= Richard Arkwright (disambiguation) =

Richard Arkwright (1732–1792) was an English inventor and entrepreneur during the early Industrial Revolution

Richard Arkwright may also refer to:

- Richard Arkwright junior (1755–1843), son of the inventor
- Richard Arkwright (1781–1832), grandson of the inventor, MP for Rye 1813–18 and 1826–30
- Richard Arkwright (barrister) (1835–1918), great-grandson of the inventor, barrister and Conservative politician, MP for Leominster 1866–76

== See also ==
- 67 (number)
