= John Dodson, 2nd Baron Monk Bretton =

British diplomat and landowner

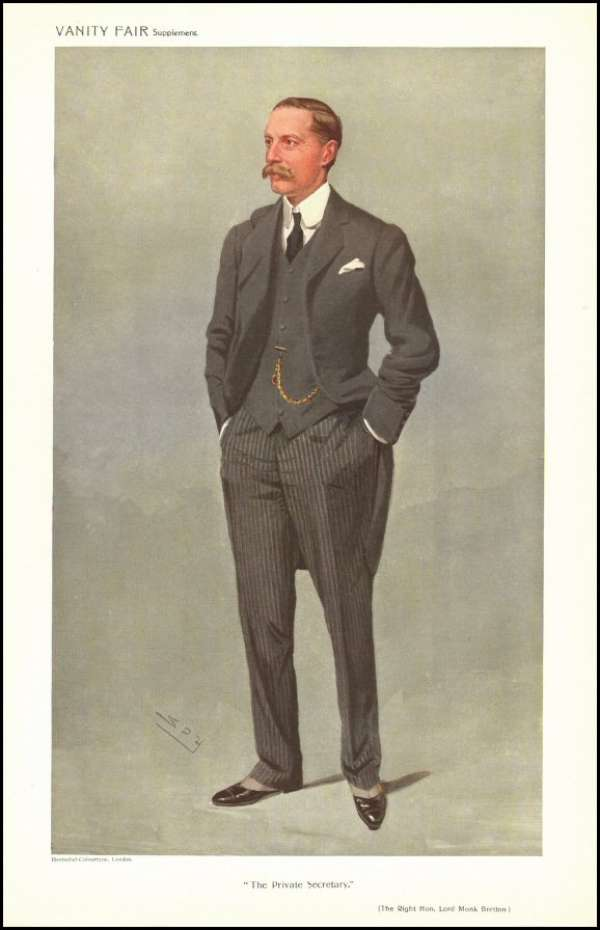
"The Private Secretary". Caricature by Spy published in Vanity Fair in 1909.

John William Dodson, 2nd Baron Monk Bretton, CB (22 September 1869 – 29 July 1933) was a British diplomat, sometime chairman of London County Council, and landowner.

The only son of the first Lord Monk Bretton, Dodson was educated at Eton (1883–1887), and New College, Oxford, (BA, 1891, 3rd class, Modern history). Was called to the Bar at the Inner Temple, June, 1891.

In 1894 he entered the Diplomatic Service. Appointed Honorary Attaché to the Legation at Tangier, 28 December 1896; and was for some time Honorary Attaché at Constantinople. Variously also appointed Honorary Attache to the Embassy at Paris, 1 February 1894. Transferred to Constantinople, 1 October 1895. He was an Honorary Attache in Paris (from 1 February 1894) and Constantinople (from 1 October 1895), where he made reports on the massacre of Armenian Christians at Constantinople, 1896, and returned to England after succeeding to the barony on 25 May 1897. He resigned on 1 October 1897.

From March 1899 to November 1900 he was assistant Private Secretary to the Secretary for Foreign Affairs, Lord Salisbury, and then 1900–1903 he was Principal Private Secretary to Secretary of State for the Colonies, Joseph Chamberlain. As such he accompanied Chamberlain on his visit to South Africa in 1902–03, following the end of the Second Boer War.

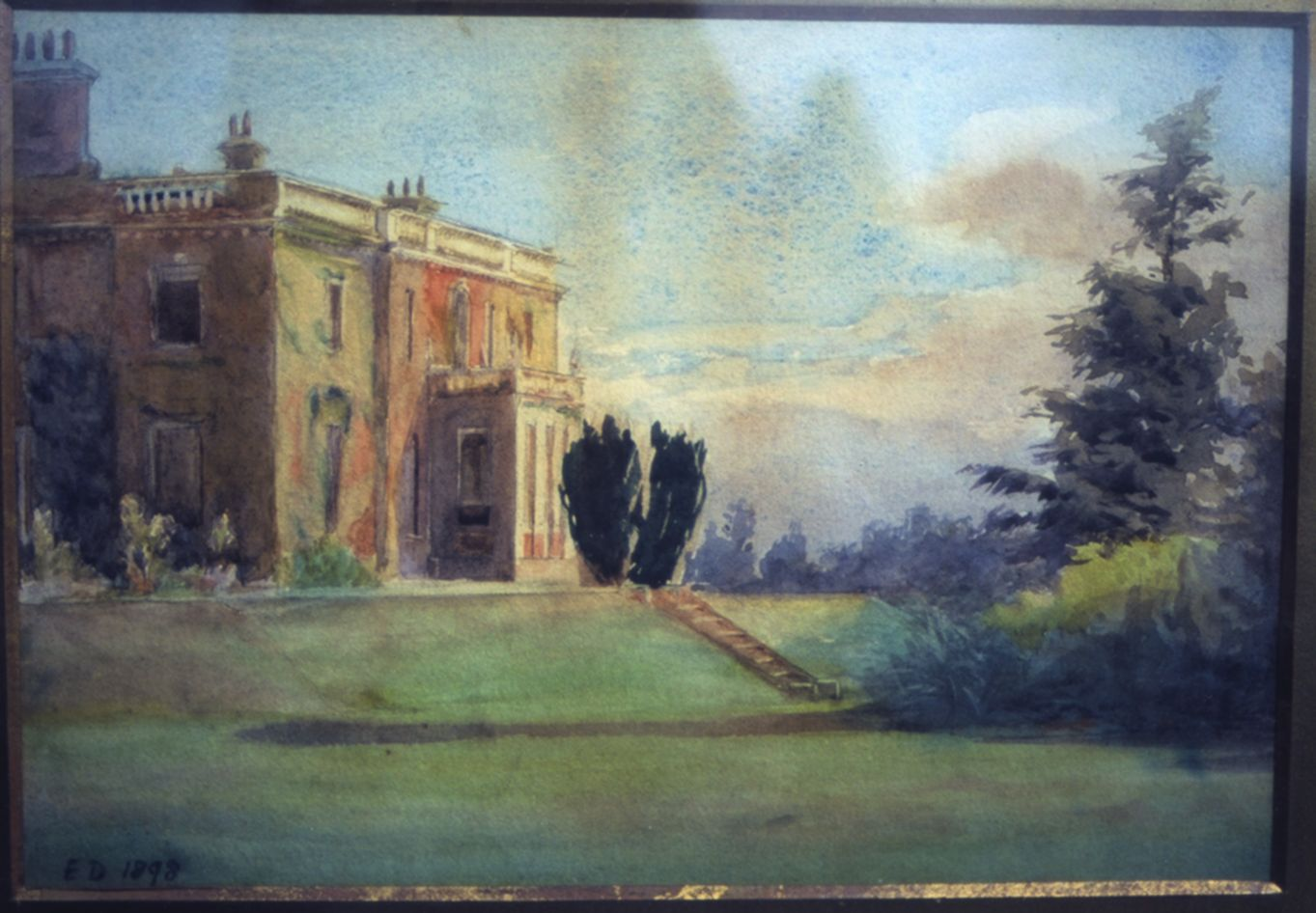
Conyboro, the house Dodson inherited in 1897/1912. An 1898 watercolour by the younger of his two elder sisters, Ethel-Millicent.

Between 1912 and 1914 he was Alderman of the London County Council (LCC); after the war he represented Clapham from 1922; he was chairman of the Parliamentary Committee (1925–1929); and he was chairman of the Council itself, 1929–1930. This was a suitable peak as Joe Chamberlain had once said of him: 'Monk Bretton knows more about local government than any other man of my acquaintance'.

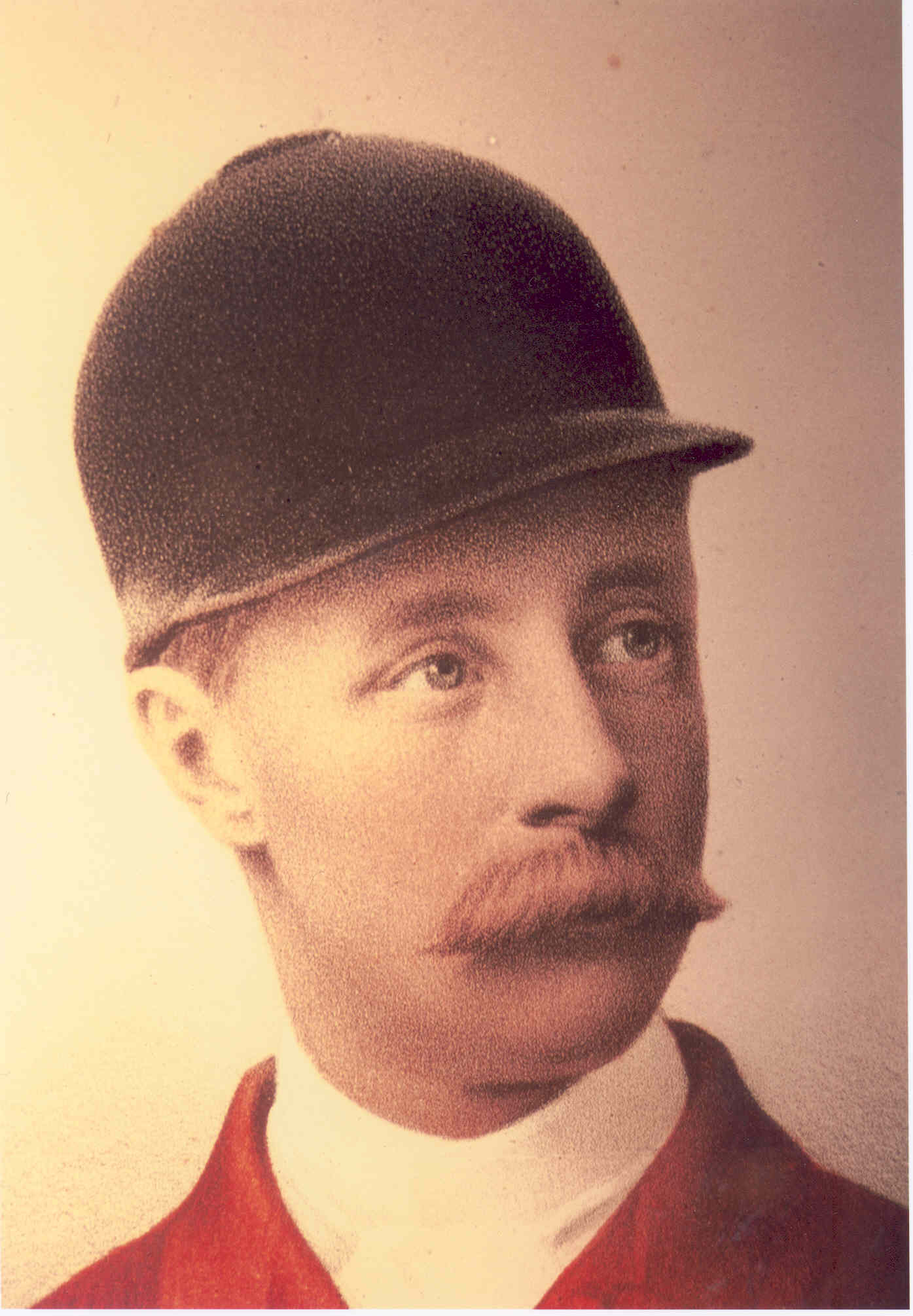
Monk Bretton's father-in-law

The Times obituary described him:

'Throughout his life he showed an unflagging perseverance in every sphere to which he devoted himself, but he never allowed his industry to overwhelm him, as it does with some with his temperament'.

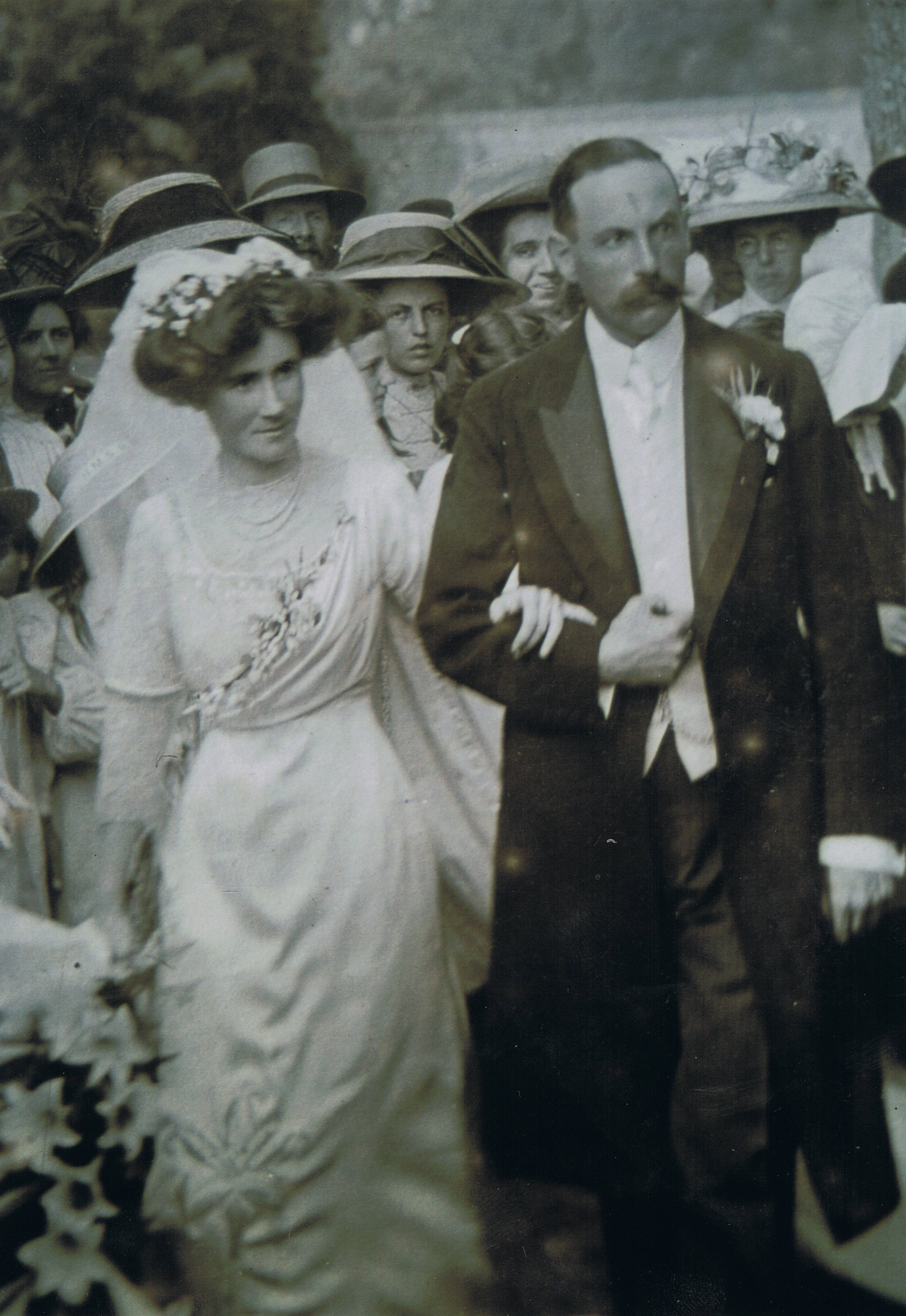
2nd Lord Monk Bretton and Ruth Brand, wedding day photo, Firle, East Sussex, 19 August 1911.

He was also a JP; Deputy Lieutenant (Sussex); in politics a Unionist; a subaltern in 1st Cinque Port Rifle Volunteers, and during the First World War he was a Major in the Sussex Yeomanry and was attached to the Naval Intelligence Department. He was a member of the Travellers' and Brooks's Clubs.

At Firle, on 19 August 1911, he married Ruth, daughter of the Hon. Charles Brand (4th son of Mr. Speaker Brand) of Little Dene, near Lewes, by Alice Emma Sturgis, daughter of Sylvain Van de Weyer.

In London he lived at 6 Seamore Place, Mayfair (that whole street was demolished c. 1938), then at 16 Princes Gardens, Knightsbridge SW7, and finally at 11 Vale Avenue (The Vale), SW3. He died aged 63 in a nursing home in Brighton on 29 July and was buried in the family vault at Barcombe in East Sussex, on 1 August 1933. He was succeeded by his only son, John Charles Dodson.

== Ancestors ==
Some of John William Dodson's ancestors
John William Dodson (1869–1933)	Father: John George Dodson, 1st Baron Monk Bretton	Paternal Grandfather: Sir John Dodson, PC, LLD (1780–1858), MP (Rye, East Sussex), Dean of the Arches.	Paternal Great-Grandfather: Rev. John Dodson (1734–1807), DD. Rector of Hurstpierpoint and Yoxall, Staffordshire. Son of Rev. Christopher Dodson (1705–1784), 51 years rector of Hurstpierpoint, Sussex.
John William Dodson (1869–1933)	Father: John George Dodson, 1st Baron Monk Bretton	Paternal Grandfather: Sir John Dodson, PC, LLD (1780–1858), MP (Rye, East Sussex), Dean of the Arches.	Paternal Great-grandmother: Frances, daughter of Rev. John Dawson, of Stapenhill house, Burton-on-Trent, co. Derby (resigned as vicar of Stapenhill, Bakewell in 1738).
John William Dodson (1869–1933)	Father: John George Dodson, 1st Baron Monk Bretton	Paternal Grandmother: Frances Priscilla Pearson (1788–1869)	Paternal Great-Grandfather: George Pearson (1751–1828) of Leicester square (and then Hanover square), and Tyers Hill, Yorkshire. FRS (1791), MD. Eminent chemist and chief physician of St George's Hospital. Friend of Kemble. From a Rotherham family. Grandson of Nataniel Pearson (d.1767), 40 years vicar of Stainton (this church closed in 1835), Doncaster.
John William Dodson (1869–1933)	Father: John George Dodson, 1st Baron Monk Bretton	Paternal Grandmother: Frances Priscilla Pearson (1788–1869)	Paternal Great-Grandmother: Frances, Mrs Pearson
John William Dodson (1869–1933)	Mother: Caroline Florence Campion (d.1912). They married in 1856. She died at 16 Princes gardens.	Maternal Grandfather: William John Campion (1804–1869) of Danny. They married in 1829.	Maternal Great-Grandfather: William John Campion (1770–1855), of Danny, near Hurstpierpoint.
John William Dodson (1869–1933)	Mother: Caroline Florence Campion (d.1912). They married in 1856. She died at 16 Princes gardens.	Maternal Grandfather: William John Campion (1804–1869) of Danny. They married in 1829.	Maternal Great-Grandmother: Jane (d.1857), daughter of Mottley Austen.
John William Dodson (1869–1933)	Mother: Caroline Florence Campion (d.1912). They married in 1856. She died at 16 Princes gardens.	Maternal Grandmother: Harriet Kemp	Maternal Great-grandfather: Thomas Read Kemp (1782–1844), of Kemptown, Brighthelmston (Brighton).
John William Dodson (1869–1933)	Mother: Caroline Florence Campion (d.1912). They married in 1856. She died at 16 Princes gardens.	Maternal Grandmother: Harriet Kemp	Maternal Great-Grandmother: Frances (d.1825), 4th daughter of Sir Francis Baring, 1st Bt

== Arms ==
Coat of arms of John Dodson, 2nd Baron Monk Bretton
Crest Argent, on a fesse raguly plain cotised between six fleurs-de-lis all gules, a sword fesseways point to the dexter proper, pommel and hilt or. Escutcheon Two lion’s jambs erased and in saltire gules, entwined by a serpent, head to the dexter proper. Supporters On either side a female figure proper, vested argent, mantle azure, each resting the exterior hand on an antique shield also azure, adorned gold, that on the dexter charged with a balance suspended, and that on the sinister, with a staff erect entwined by a serpent all or. Motto Benigno Numine Enisus (Successful by favour of Providence)

Peerage of the United Kingdom
Preceded by John George Dodson	Baron Monk Bretton; 1897–1933	Succeeded by John Charles Dodson
Political offices
Preceded by Sir Cecil Levita	Chairman of the London County Council; 1929–1930	Succeeded by Robert Inigo Tasker
