= John Edward Jackson =

John Edward Jackson may refer to:

- Edward Jackson (diplomat) (John Edward Jackson, 1925–2002), British diplomat
- John Edward Jackson (antiquarian) (1805–1891), English cleric, antiquary and archivist
