= Abraham de la Pryme =

English antiquarian (1671–1704)

Abraham de la Pryme (15 January 1671 – 12 June 1704) was an English antiquary.

== Life ==
Abraham de la Pryme was born to French Huguenot parents, Matthias de la Pryme and Sarah Smague (or Smagge) at Hatfield in 1671. Despite his father's desire that he should attend the University of Glasgow and then become a Presbyterian minister, de la Pryme insisted on attending the University of Cambridge, becoming a pensioner of St John's College in 1690. Here de la Pryme devoted much of his time to natural history, chemistry, and magic before receiving his BA in 1693–1694.

He became curate of Broughton but resigned in 1696 with intention of writing a history of Hatfield: In 1698 he was appointed curate of Holy Trinity Church, Hull, and in 1701 he was appointed by the Duke of Devonshire to the position of curate at Thorne. Whilst visiting the sick there he became ill and died in 1704. He was buried at Hatfield.

De la Pryme began keeping a diary—Ephemeris Vitae: A Diary of My Own Life—at the age of twelve and continued it until his death. This diary was published by the Surtees Society in 1870. Whilst writing his history of Hatfield, de la Pryme began to correspond with Sir Hans Sloane and the antiquary Thomas Gale. Whilst at Hull he amassed material for a history of that city. Unfinished at his death, the two volume work was finally published in 1986. In 1701 he was elected Fellow of the Royal Society, having communicated with the Society on topics as varied as archaeology, natural history, and meteorology.

== Works ==
- "A Letter from the Reverend Mr Abraham de la Pryme, to the Very Reverend Dr G. D. of Y. and F. R. S. concerning Some Roman Antiquities in Lincolnshire", Philosophical Transactions 22 (1700): pp. 561–567
- "A Letter of the Reverend Mr Abr. de la Pryme to the Publisher, concerning Broughton in Lincolnshire, with His Observations on the Shell-Fish Observed in the Quarries about That Place", Philosophical Transactions 22 (1700): pp. 677–687
- "Part of a Letter from the Reverend Mr Abraham Dela Pryme to the Publisher, concerning Trees Found Under Ground in Hatfield Chace", Philosophical Transactions 22 (1700): pp. 980–992
- "Extracts of Two Letters from the Reverend Mr Abraham de la Pryme, F. R. S, to the Publisher, concerning Subterraneous Trees, the Bitings of Mad Dogs, etc.", Philosophical Transactions 23 (1702): pp. 1073–1077
- "Part of a Letter to the Publisher, from the Reverend Mr. Abr. de la Pryme, Giving an Account of Some Observations He Made concerning Vegetation", Philosophical Transactions 23 (1702): pp. 1214–1216
- "Part of a Letter from the Reverend Mr Abraham de la Pryme, F. R. S. to the Publisher, concerning a Spout Observed by Him in Yorkshire", Philosophical Transactions 23 (1702): pp. 1243–1248
- "Part of a Letter from the Reverend Mr Abraham de la Pryme F. R. S. to the Publisher, concerning a Spout Lately Observed by Him in Hatfield", Philosophical Transactions 23 (1702): pp. 1331–1332
- The Diary of Abraham de la Pryme, the Yorkshire Antiquary, edited by Charles Jackson. Publications of the Surtees Society volume 54, Durham: Andrews and Company, 1870.
- A History of Kingston upon Hull. Hull: Kingston upon Hull City Council and Malet Lambert High School, 1986

== Bibliography ==
- Fletcher, J.S., 1921, Yorkshiremen of the Restoration. London: George Allen and Unwin.
