= John Dodson, 3rd Baron Monk Bretton =

British peer (1924–2022)

John Charles Dodson, 3rd Baron Monk Bretton DL (17 July 1924 – 26 May 2022) was a British agriculturist, Sussex landowner, and hereditary peer who was a long–serving member of the House of Lords from 1948 to 1999.

John Dodson succeeded his father, John William Dodson, on 29 July 1933; aged only nine. Thus he held a peerage for 88 years (1933-2022), this is thought to be the world record. He was educated at Institut Le Rosey; Westminster (March 1941-July 1942); and New College, Oxford (matric. Michaelmas 1942; B.A. and M.A. 1952). He became a member of Brooks's in 1949 and married Zoe Diana Ian Douglas Scott, daughter of Ian Douglas Scott, of Winchelsea, Sussex, in 1958. They had two sons.

Between 1966 and 1968 Lord and Lady Monk Bretton had Raymond Erith re-model a Queen Anne house his great-grandfather, Sir John Dodson, had acquired near Barcombe from the family of Percy Bysshe Shelley. The Dodsons had hitherto largely just rented it out; Bosie, Lord Alfred Douglas, for example, was a tenant circa 1920. The house, Shelley's Folly, Erith described as 'a little pavilion, on a knoll, built for the view'. Monk Bretton, having consequently sold another larger and newer nearby house, lived there until moving to Switzerland in 2004.

He has been a Deputy Lieutenant for East Sussex since 1983, and a stalwart of the South of England Agricultural Society show, at Ardingly, since its foundation in 1967.

Following expulsion from the House of Lords in 1999 following the passing of the House of Lords Act, he moved to the Lake Geneva northern shore.

Lord Monk Bretton died on 26 May 2022, at the age of 97.

== Monk Bretton in the Lords ==
Lord Monk Bretton first sat in Parliament at the age of 23 on 27 January 1948. He was greeted by the Second Reading of the Parliament Act 1949. Over 51 years later the by then 75-year-old peer was excluded by the House of Lords Act 1999. His maiden speech was made on 18 March 1948 in Lord Dowding's Notice debate on the Slaughter of Animals.

At 5.30 p.m. on Tuesday 9 November 1999 Lord Grantchester rose to ask Her Majesty's Government how their proposals for the milk industry and in particular for the supply of raw milk will affect the rural economy, in the ensuing debate Monk Bretton made his valediction. He concluded his 13-minute speech thus:

That is the end of my remarks, but I wish also to say goodbye. It is likely that the noble Lord, Lord Grantchester, who initiated this debate, and I will no longer attend this House. I am delighted that a maiden speaker (Lord Carlile of Berriew) is to speak after me. I hope that he will carry the torch for British dairying.

== Ancestors ==
Some of Monk Bretton's ancestors
John Charles Dodson (1924–2022)	Father: John William Dodson, 2nd Baron Monk Bretton (1869-1933)	Paternal Grandfather: John George Dodson, 1st Baron Monk Bretton (1825-1897)	Paternal Great-Grandfather: Sir John Dodson (1780-1858)
John Charles Dodson (1924–2022)	Father: John William Dodson, 2nd Baron Monk Bretton (1869-1933)	Paternal Grandfather: John George Dodson, 1st Baron Monk Bretton (1825-1897)	Paternal Great-grandmother: Frances-Priscilla Pearson (1788–1869), daughter of George Pearson, MD, FRS, LRCP of London, and Tyers Hill, Darfield, Yorkshire
John Charles Dodson (1924–2022)	Father: John William Dodson, 2nd Baron Monk Bretton (1869-1933)	Paternal Grandmother: Caroline-Florence Campion (died 1912)	Paternal Great-Grandfather: William John Campion (1804-1869) of Danny House
John Charles Dodson (1924–2022)	Father: John William Dodson, 2nd Baron Monk Bretton (1869-1933)	Paternal Grandmother: Caroline-Florence Campion (died 1912)	Paternal Great-Grandmother: Harriet Kemp, daughter of Thomas Read Kemp
John Charles Dodson (1924–2022)	Mother: Ruth Brand (died 1967)	Maternal Grandfather: Hon. Charles Brand, MFH (1855-1912)	Maternal Great-Grandfather: Speaker Brand, Viscount Hampden & 23rd Baron Dacre (1814-1892)
John Charles Dodson (1924–2022)	Mother: Ruth Brand (died 1967)	Maternal Grandfather: Hon. Charles Brand, MFH (1855-1912)	Maternal Great-Grandmother: Eliza Ellice (1818-1899), daughter of General Robert Ellice and Eliza Courtney (Eliza was lovechild of Prime Minister Earl Grey and Georgiana, Duchess of Devonshire)
John Charles Dodson (1924–2022)	Mother: Ruth Brand (died 1967)	Maternal Grandmother: Alice van de Weyer (1856-1926)	Maternal Great-grandfather: Sylvain van de Weyer (1802-1874)
John Charles Dodson (1924–2022)	Mother: Ruth Brand (died 1967)	Maternal Grandmother: Alice van de Weyer (1856-1926)	Maternal Great-Grandmother: Elizabeth Bates (1817-1878), daughter of Joshua Bates

== Arms ==
Coat of arms of John Dodson, 3rd Baron Monk Bretton
Crest Argent, on a fesse raguly plain cotised between six fleurs-de-lis all gules, a sword fesseways point to the dexter proper, pommel and hilt or. Escutcheon Two lion’s jambs erased and in saltire gules, entwined by a serpent, head to the dexter proper. Supporters On either side a female figure proper, vested argent, mantle azure, each resting the exterior hand on an antique shield also azure, adorned gold, that on the dexter charged with a balance suspended, and that on the sinister, with a staff erect entwined by a serpent all or. Motto Benigno Numine Enisus (Successful by favour of Providence)

Peerage of the United Kingdom
Preceded by John William Dodson	Baron Monk Bretton; 1933–2022; Member of the House of Lords (1948–1999)	Succeeded by Christopher Mark Dodson
