= George Pearson (doctor) =

British physician

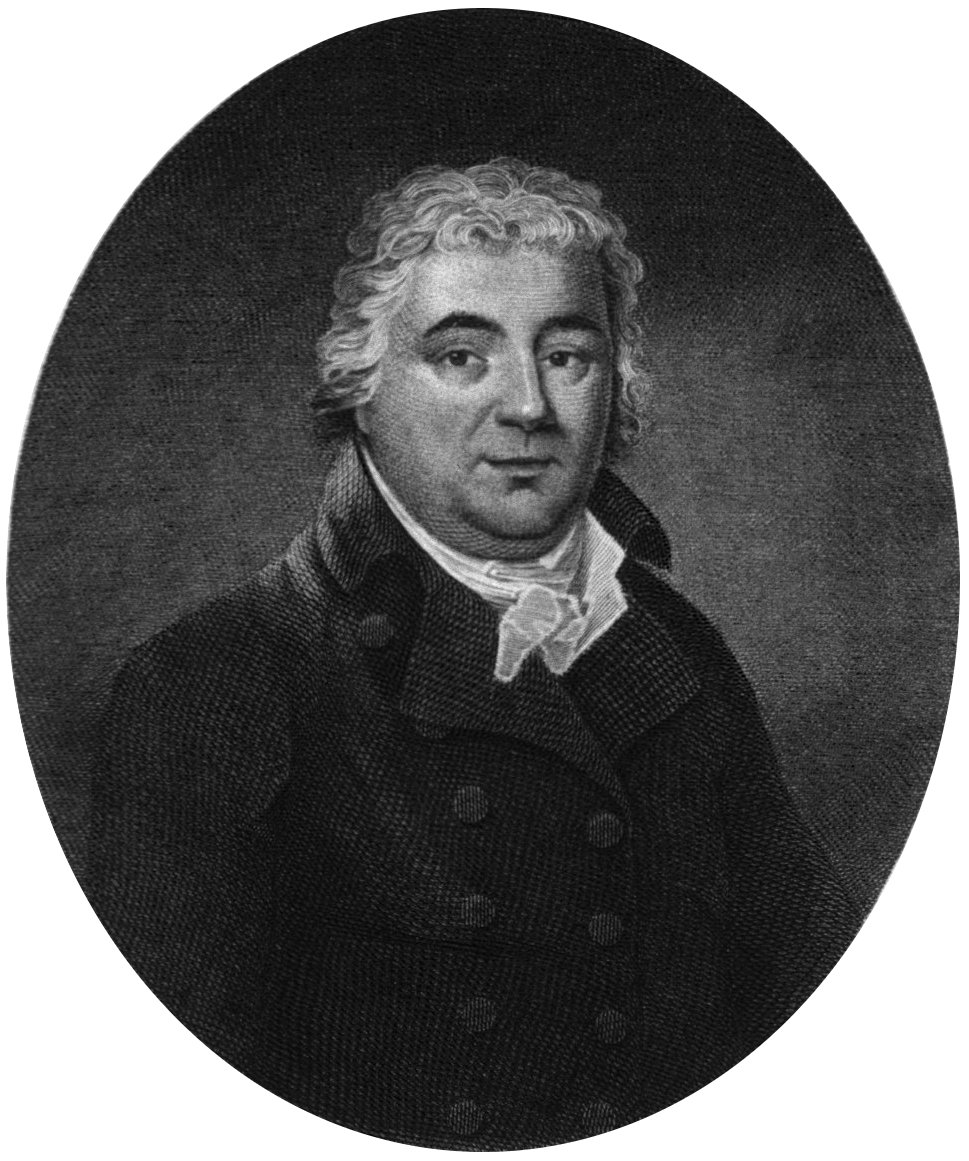

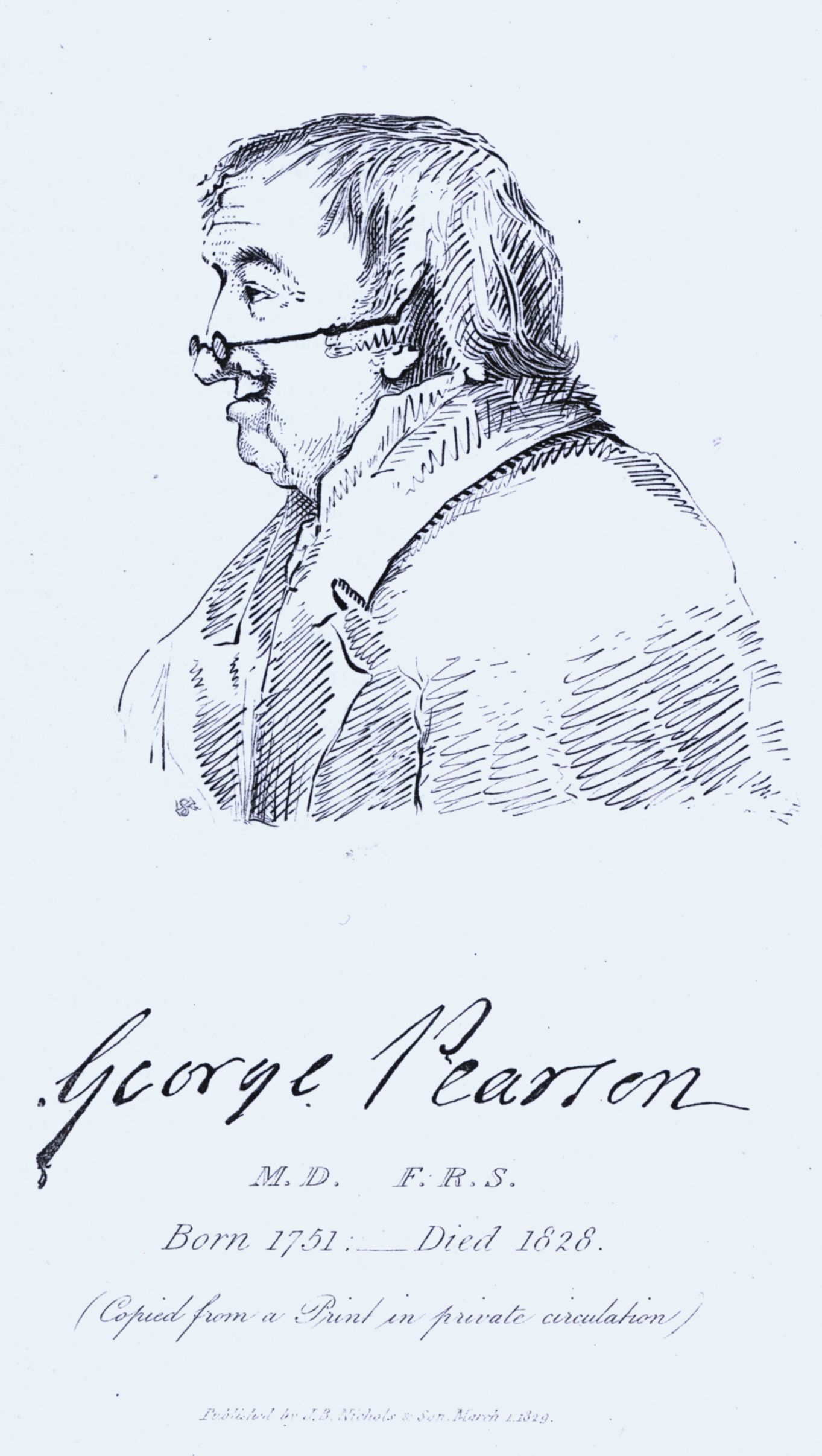
George Pearson. From the sketch belonging to St George's Hospital, via 'The Gentleman's Magazine', 1829.

George Pearson FRS (1751–1828) was a British medical doctor, chemist and early advocate of Jenner's cowpox vaccination.

Davies Gilbert, who was then President of the Royal Society, began his 1829 memoir (written anonymously) of Dr. Pearson thus:

'THIS eminent physician, celebrated chemist, and amiable though singular individual has, at an advanced age, fallen under the stroke of his ancient but indomitable enemy.'

He continued:

'Dr. Pearson was born at Rotherham in Yorkshire. [His father, John, was an apothecary]. His grandfather Nathaniel, was for years Vicar of Stainton, in that neighbourhood, and died in 1767 at the age of 88. His uncle, George after whom he was named, was a wine-merchant at Doncaster for upwards of thirty years a member of the Corporation, and twice Mayor of the Borough [1785 and 1793].'

Pearson studied in Edinburgh, took his MD in 1771 and went to study for a year at St. Thomas's Hospital. He settled in Doncaster in 1777. In his six years there he became a close friend of John Philip Kemble and analysed the water at Buxton, about which he produced a two-volume work. In 1783 he moved to London, to Leicester Square, and was admitted a Licentiate of the Royal College of Physicians on 25 June 1784. He began to lecture. He was elected (chief) Physician of St George's Hospital on 23 February 1787, and was there for the next forty years. He was elected a Fellow of the Royal Society on 23 June 1791. (He served on the Society's Council in 1802 and in 1827, in which year he gave the Bakerian Lecture, Researches to discover the Faculties of Pulmonary Absorption with respect to Charcoal).

Davies went on:

'Dr. Pearon was acknowledged by good judges, to be a sound Greek and Latin scholar. He was a hospitable landlord, a disinterested friend, and a very good-humoured and jocose companion : he abounded in anecdotes, which he took with excellent effect. He would often observe to his friends, that he knew he was growing old; but that he had made up his mind to die 'in harness.''

On Sunday 9 November 1828 he died at his home in George Street (9 St. George Street), Hanover Square, in Davies' words: 'in consequence of a fall down stairs'.

He left two daughters; one, Frances Priscilla, married John Dodson, DCL (and formerly M. P.), and the other, Mary-Anne, was, once again as Davies put it in 1828, single.

== Pearson and the Royal Society ==
His first application to the Royal Society had been rejected on ballot 15 June 1786, when his neighbour and St. George's colleague John Hunter (surgeon) had been his lead proposer.

For his second attempt in 1791 Pearson's proposers were George Baker; William Heberden; Robert Hallifax (Royal physician); William Seward; John Gunning; Andrew Kippis; Thomas Bowdler; James Keir; Maxwell Garthshore; James Carmichael Smyth; Bp. Landaff; George Staunton; John Paradise; William Young; John Ash; Tiberius Cavallo; William Watson; Dr. (?) Gray; John Gillies.

== Pearson and Smallpox Vaccination ==
Pearson was a very early advocate of smallpox vaccination and supporter of Edward Jenner and published his early observations within months of the publication of Jenner's Inquiry. Early in 1799 he helped to set up the Original Vaccine Pock Institute in London and started to distribute vaccine, some samples of which were contaminated with smallpox virus. This caused a rift with Jenner who thought his own work was being overshadowed. In turn, Pearson became envious of Jenner's growing reputation. When Jenner petitioned Parliament for a financial reward in 1802, Pearson published a detailed account of his own contribution, together with evidence that Jenner did not discover vaccination, bringing attention to farmer Benjamin Jesty and others who he maintained had prior claims. When Jenner sought a further Parliamentary grant in 1805, Pearson brought Jesty to London to visit the Original Vaccine Pock Institute to further his claim, with no success. By this time, although there was opposition to vaccination as such, Jenner's role in its introduction was firmly established and Pearson played little further part. However, his role in the introduction of smallpox vaccine was examined in detail much later when controversy arose over the origin of vaccinia virus, the active constituent of smallpox vaccine.

== No. 52 Leicester Square ==
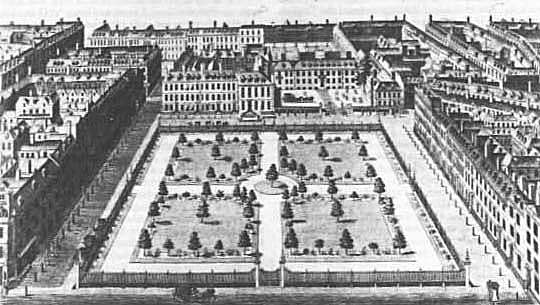
Leicester Square in 1750

For 20 years, between the ages of 34 and 54, from 1785–1805, Dr. Pearson lived at 52 Leicester Square. His predecessors there included Sir Paul Rycaut, the traveller, diplomat, and historian of Turkey, 1679-c. 1684; Justice Robert Perryman or Perrismore, 1704–11; Jacques Christophe Le Blon (Le Blond), painter, engraver and printer, 1734–5; Sir William Wolseley, of Wolseley, Staffordshire, fifth baronet, 1757– 1768; Vice-Admiral John Campbell, 1774–82. The house was demolished in the 1840s making way for New Coventry Street.

== Pearson of Tyers Hill ==
As a result of his marriage to (probably his cousin) Frances Pearson, co-heir and daughter of Nathaniel Pearson (mayor of Doncaster, 1763) by his heiress (married 1743) wife Priscilla Rayney (died 1751), of Tyers Hill, George Pearson became involved with Tyers Hill a small estate near Ardsley, Darfield, Barnsley.

Priscilla Rayney, a first cousin, four times removed, of the first of the Rayney baronets, was daughter and co-heir of Alderman (mayor of Doncaster 1725) Thomas Rayney (d.1731?) by (married 1715) Frances daughter of Alderman John Fayram (Doncaster mayor, 1658).

Thomas Rayney was son of Henry Rayney (1614–1682) by (married 1650) Priscilla (1625–1682) daughter of William Wordsworth (c1590-1666), of Falthwaite, Silkstone, Penistone (who left three closes in Barnsley to Priscilla) by Helen Crosland. Henry Rayney was son of John Rayney of Tyers Hill by Anne, daughter of William Wentworth (1580–1635) of South Kirkby, S. Yorks.

John Rayney's grandfather, Henry Rayney of Ferrymoor, had bought Tyers Hill from John Byron in 1569. The nearby Monk Bretton priory was dissolved on 30 November 1538.

Into the mid-twentieth century the heirs of Pearson and Rayneys were leasing Meltonfield and Parkgate seams of coal under Tyershill Farm and land at Cudworth, Darfield and Royston, (probably including the land at Ferry Moor (Ferrymoor) just west of Grimethorpe), to the Mitchell's Main Colliery Company Limited.

George Pearson's wife was a third cousin once removed of William Wordsworth. Between 1775–1799 George Pearson's father, the apothecary, who owned Mosborough Hall, Sheffield, and his mother was Deborah daughter of George Smith by Mary, daughter of John Burnley of Moorgate, Rotherham, a butcher. George Smith is associated with property in Wortley; Tankersley; and Mortomley and High Green, Ecclesfield.

On Pearson's death the Tyers Hill property was inherited by Sir John Dodson, who had married Frances-Priscilla, Pearson's eldest daughter, on 24 December 1822, thus according to John Bateman, who derived his information from statistics published in 1873, John Dodson's son John George Dodson (Lord Monk Bretton) had 181 acres of farmland in the West Riding of Yorkshire, with a rental income worth 300 guineas per annum.

The arms of Pearson of Tyers Hill: Shield: azure between two palets wavy ermine three suns or. Crest: out of a cloud, a sun.

== Three of his wife's great-nephews ==
- Rev. John Edward Jackson, FSA (1805–1891), antiquary, was born in Doncaster, the son of James Jackson, banker and sometime mayor of Doncaster (1795, 1803, 1814), and his wife, Henrietta-Priscilla, second daughter of Freeman Bower of Killerby Hall, near Scarborough and of Bawtry, by (married 1777) Mary Pearson (d.1794).
- Charles Jackson (1809–1882), antiquary, brother of the above.
- Rev. Frederick Watkins, (1808–1888), son of Rev. Henry Watkins of Bamburgh (Barnborough/Barnburgh), Yorkshire and his wife Frances-Mary, elder daughter of Freeman Bower.

== Wife's nephew ==
- Henry Bower, FSA, DL, (died 25 February 1842, aged 63), of Hall Gate, Doncaster. Formerly of Tickhill, Doncaster. Only surviving son of Freeman Bower, by Mary Pearson, and last male representative of the younger branch of the Bowers of Bridlington. He was educated at Eton College and Emmanuel College, Cambridge. As a result of his superintendence and services as President of Doncaster's Public Library the supporters of that institution in 1841 had a portrait of him by Henry William Pickersgill, RA painted and then placed in the library.

On 10 July 1798 Bower was appointed a Lieutenant in the Fifth West Yorkshire Militia, and then on 1 April 1808 he was promoted to Captain in the Doncaster Volunteer Infantry.

== Selected works ==
- George Pearson, Observations and Experiments forinvestigating the Chymical History of the Tepid Springs of Buxton; intended for the improvement of Natural Science and the Art of Physic, two vols., 8vo., J. Johnson, London, 1783.
- George Pearson, Directions for Impregnating the Buxton Waters with its own and other Gases, and for composing Artificial Buxton Water, J. Johnson, London, 1785.
- George Pearson, An account of the preparation and uses of the phosphorated soda; being an abstract of a paper on that subject inserted in the Journal de Physique, August 1788, London, 1789.
- George Pearson, Experiments and Observations on the Constituent Parts of the Potatoe-Root [sic], London, 1795.
- George Pearson, An Inquiry Concerning the History of the Cow Pox, Johnson, London, 1798.
- George Pearson, Circular Letter on the Cow Pox. Med. Phys. J. 1799. 2; 113–5.
- George Pearson, A Statement of the Progress in the Vaccine Inoculation. Med. Phys. J. 1799; 2; 213-25.
- George Pearson, An examination of the Report of the Committee of the House of Commons on the claims of remuneration for the vaccine pock inoculation, containing a statement of the principal historical facts of the vaccina, J. Johnson, 1802.
- George Pearson, Researches to discover the faculties of pulmonary absorption with respect to charcoal, Bakerian lecture, delivered to the Royal Society, 20 December 1827.
