= Thomas Phillipps Lamb =

English politician (1752–1819)

Thomas Phillipps Lamb (1752 – 1819) was an English politician.

== Life ==
Lamb was born in 1752, the son of Thomas Lamb, many times mayor of Rye, Sussex, and his wife Dorothy Eyles, daughter of the Rev. George Eyles, vicar of Turk Dean. He was Member of Parliament (MP) for Rye from 1812 until his death.

== Family ==
In 1774, Lamb married Elizabeth Davis, daughter of William Davis of Rye. They had three sons and two daughters. Of the sons, Thomas was a priest in the Church of England and held incumbencies at Windlesham, Bagshot, West Hackney and the City of London. Their daughter (Martha) Sabina married Antonio Caccia (1801–1867) in 1829 from Milan, a political exile.

Parliament of the United Kingdom
Preceded by William Jacob	Member of Parliament for Rye; 1812 – 1818; With: Charles Wetherell; Richard Arkwright	Succeeded by John Maberly
Preceded by Charles Arbuthnot	Member of Parliament for Rye; 26 February 1819 – 26 June 1819; With: Peter Browne	Succeeded by John Dodson
