= Frederick Watkins (priest) =

Frederick Watkins (1 April 1808 – 6 February 1888) was an English Anglican clergyman. He was Archdeacon of York from 1874 until his death. He is also noted as being a school- and university friend of Charles Darwin with whom he shared correspondence.

== Biography ==
Watkins was the son of Rev. Henry Watkins of Bamburgh, Yorkshire and his wife Frances Mary, daughter of Freeman Bower, JP, DL, of Killerby Hall, Yorkshire and Bawtry, Yorkshire. His aunt Mary (d.1784) married (1727) Peter Whitton, who was Lord Mayor of York in 1728, and then secondly (1742) George Perrot (1710–1780), Baron of the Exchequer (in 1769 he was the sole owner and proprietor of the navigation of the river Avon from Tewkesbury to Evesham). He was educated at Shrewsbury School and at Westminster School. He was admitted to Christ's College, Cambridge in 1825 but only kept two terms. He was admitted to Emmanuel College, Cambridge in 1827, and received the degrees of B.A. 1830; M.A. 1833; BD 1840. He was a Fellow of Emmanuel College in 1838-1847. George Pearson was a great-uncle.

Darwin was also an Old Salopian and studied at Christ's College from 1827 after discontinuing his medical studies at Edinburgh. He was a year older than Charles, and three years younger than Charles's brother Erasmus Alvey Darwin.

He was H.M. Inspector of Schools, from 1841 until 1873.

He married twice, first on 5 August 1847, to Amelia, daughter of the Rev. George Millett (sometime Fellow of Christ's), and at least one child, Harry Trant Godfrey Watkins. He married for a second time, on 17 September 1873, Fanny, daughter of William Chambers, of Hafod, Cardiganshire.

He died at Bournemouth and is buried in All Saints' Church, Long Marston in North Yorkshire.
