= Clapham (London County Council constituency) =

London County Council constituency

- Former constituency for the London County Council

Former constituency
- Created: 1889
- Abolished: 1965
- Members: 2 (to 1949); 3 (from 1949)

Clapham was a constituency used for elections to the London County Council between 1889 and the council's abolition, in 1965. The seat shared boundaries with the UK Parliament constituency of the same name.

== Councillors ==
Year	Name	Party	Name	Party	Name	Party
1889	Thomas Lorimer Corbett	Moderate	Arthur Rotton	Moderate	Two seats until 1949	
1892	Fred Henderson	Labour Progressive	Henry Hollier Hood Barrs	Progressive	Two seats until 1949	
1893	Arthur Rotton	Moderate	Henry Hollier Hood Barrs	Progressive	Two seats until 1949	
1895	Arthur Rotton	Moderate	Thomas Lorimer Corbett	Moderate	Two seats until 1949	
1901	Arthur Rotton	Moderate	Thomas Penn Gaskell	Moderate	Two seats until 1949	
1907	James William Domoney	Municipal Reform	Clement Kinloch-Cooke	Municipal Reform	Two seats until 1949	
1910	Alexander Murray	Municipal Reform	Robert Sebag-Montefiore	Municipal Reform	Two seats until 1949	
1913	H. E. S. Parsons	Municipal Reform	Robert Sebag-Montefiore	Municipal Reform	Two seats until 1949	
1915	H. E. S. Parsons	Municipal Reform	William Henry Peruzzi Gibson	Municipal Reform	Two seats until 1949	
1919	Herbert Francis Golds	Municipal Reform	George Bettesworth Piggott	Municipal Reform	Two seats until 1949	
1921	Cyril Henry Montague Jacobs	Municipal Reform	George Bettesworth Piggott	Municipal Reform	Two seats until 1949	
1922	Cyril Henry Montague Jacobs	Municipal Reform	John Dodson	Municipal Reform	Two seats until 1949	
1934	Cyril Henry Montague Jacobs	Municipal Reform	John Leigh	Municipal Reform	Two seats until 1949	
1934	Bertram Mills	Municipal Reform	John Leigh	Municipal Reform	Two seats until 1949	
1938	John Battley	Labour	John Leigh	Municipal Reform	Two seats until 1949	
1946	Leslie Banks	Labour	Alfred Bransom	Labour	Two seats until 1949	
1949	William Charles Bonney	Conservative	Irene Dowling	Conservative	Neville Rayner	Conservative
1952	Leslie Banks	Labour	James Benjamin Hayward	Labour	Christina Lawrence	Labour
1955	Muriel Gumbel	Conservative	Francis Hadwen	Conservative	Geoffrey Mowbray	Conservative
1958	Leslie Banks	Labour	Terence Dermott Cranfield	Labour	Winifred Katz	Labour
1961	William Walter Emden	Conservative	Lintorn Trevor Highett	Conservative	Ursula Tracey	Conservative

== Election results ==
1889 London County Council election: Clapham
Party	Candidate	Votes	%	±%
Moderate	Thomas Lorimer Corbett	2,501		
Moderate	Arthur Rotton	2,336		
Progressive	Horace Turner	2,286		
Progressive	Charles Conybeare	1,883		
Moderate win (new seat)				
Moderate win (new seat)				

1892 London County Council election: Clapham
Party	Candidate	Votes	%	±%
Labour Progressive	Fred Henderson	4,063		
Progressive	Henry Hollier Hood Barrs	4,007		
Moderate	Arthur Rotton	3,150		
Moderate	Thomas Lorimer Corbett	3,147		
Labour Progressive gain from Moderate		Swing		
Progressive gain from Moderate		Swing		

1893 Clapham by-election
Party	Candidate	Votes	%	±%
Moderate	Arthur Rotton	3,607		
Progressive	David Martineau	3,422		
Moderate gain from Progressive		Swing		

1895 London County Council election: Clapham
Party	Candidate	Votes	%	±%
Moderate	Arthur Rotton	4,191		
Moderate	Thomas Lorimer Corbett	4,172		
Progressive	C. J. Rowe	3,307		
Progressive	J. B. Batten	3,292		
Moderate gain from Labour Progressive		Swing		
Moderate gain from Progressive		Swing		

1898 London County Council election: Clapham
Party	Candidate	Votes	%	±%
Moderate	Arthur Rotton	4,785		
Moderate	Thomas Lorimer Corbett	4,757		
Progressive	D. Martineau	3,929		
Progressive	Harry Gosling	3,842		
Moderate hold		Swing		
Moderate hold		Swing		

1901 London County Council election: Clapham
Party	Candidate	Votes	%	±%
Conservative	Arthur Rotton	4,141	34.2	
Conservative	Thomas Penn Gaskell	4,058	33.5	
Progressive	George Hewitt	3,903	32.3	
Conservative hold		Swing		
Conservative hold		Swing		

1904 London County Council election: Clapham
Party	Candidate	Votes	%	±%
Conservative	Arthur Rotton	5,910		
Conservative	Thomas Penn Gaskell	5,764		
Progressive	John George Kipling	5,544		
Progressive	E. C. Pannett	5,408		
Majority				
Municipal Reform hold		Swing		
Conservative hold		Swing		

1907 London County Council election: Clapham
Party	Candidate	Votes	%	±%
Municipal Reform	James William Domoney	10,200		
Municipal Reform	Clement Kinloch-Cooke	10,158		
Progressive	A. Glegg	7,320		
Progressive	John George Kipling	7,276		
Majority				
Municipal Reform hold		Swing		
Municipal Reform hold		Swing		

1910 London County Council election: Clapham
Party	Candidate	Votes	%	±%
Municipal Reform	Alexander Murray	9,184	30.6	
Municipal Reform	Robert Sebag-Montefiore	9,087	30.3	
Progressive	F. Griffiths	5,864	19.5	
Progressive	William Watts	5,861	19.5	
Majority		3,223	10.8	
Municipal Reform hold		Swing		
Municipal Reform hold		Swing		

1913 London County Council election: Clapham
Party	Candidate	Votes	%	±%
Municipal Reform	Robert Sebag-Montefiore	8,890	28.0	−2.3
Municipal Reform	Herbert James Francis Parsons	8,881	27.9	−2.7
Progressive	Hubert Beaumont	7,049	22.2	+2.7
Progressive	Oswald Partington	6,971	21.9	+2.4
Majority		1,832	5.7	
Municipal Reform hold		Swing	-2.5	
Municipal Reform hold		Swing		

1919 London County Council election: Clapham
Party	Candidate	Votes	%	±%
Municipal Reform	George Bettesworth Piggott	Unopposed	n/a	n/a
Municipal Reform	Herbert Francis Golds	Unopposed	n/a	n/a
Municipal Reform hold		Swing	n/a	
Municipal Reform hold		Swing	n/a	

Clapham by-election, 1921
Party	Candidate	Votes	%	±%
Municipal Reform	Cyril Jacobs	7,293	66.7	
Labour	Frederick Thoresby	3,638	33.3	
Majority		3,655		
Municipal Reform hold		Swing		

1922 London County Council election: Clapham
Party	Candidate	Votes	%	±%
Municipal Reform	Cyril Jacobs	8,993	36.3	
Municipal Reform	John Dodson	8,707	35.2	
Labour	H. Harries	3,522	14.2	n/a
Labour	A. S. Albery	3,522	14.2	n/a
Majority		5,185	21.0	n/a
Municipal Reform hold		Swing	n/a	
Municipal Reform hold		Swing	n/a	

1925 London County Council election: Clapham
Party	Candidate	Votes	%	±%
Municipal Reform	Cyril Jacobs	5,871		
Municipal Reform	John Dodson	5,825		
Labour	John Lincoln Mahon	2,985		
Labour	James Kaylor	2,956		
Majority				
Municipal Reform hold		Swing		
Municipal Reform hold		Swing		

1928 London County Council election: Clapham
Party	Candidate	Votes	%	±%
Municipal Reform	Cyril Jacobs	Unopposed	n/a	n/a
Municipal Reform	John Dodson	Unopposed	n/a	n/a
Municipal Reform hold		Swing		
Municipal Reform hold		Swing		

1931 London County Council election: Clapham
Party	Candidate	Votes	%	±%
Municipal Reform	John Dodson	5,429		
Municipal Reform	Cyril Jacobs	5,256		
Labour	A. M. Tapp	2,450		
Labour	Thomas Dawson	2,445		
Liberal	John Henry Clarke	1,444		
Majority				
Municipal Reform hold		Swing		
Municipal Reform hold		Swing		

1934 London County Council election: Clapham
Party	Candidate	Votes	%	±%
Municipal Reform	John Leigh	5,861		
Municipal Reform	Cyril Jacobs	5,782		
Labour	Leslie Banks	4,446		
Labour	George Hay	4,419		
Majority				
Municipal Reform hold		Swing		
Municipal Reform hold		Swing		

Clapham by-election, 1934
Party	Candidate	Votes	%	±%
Municipal Reform	Bertram Mills	5,378		
Ind. Labour Party	Hilda Browning	2,825		
Majority		2,553		
Municipal Reform hold		Swing		

1937 London County Council election: Clapham
Party	Candidate	Votes	%	±%
Municipal Reform	John Leigh	8,968		
Municipal Reform	Bertram Mills	8,793		
Labour	John Battley	7,153		
Labour	Leslie Banks	7,147		
Majority				
Municipal Reform hold		Swing		
Municipal Reform hold		Swing		

Clapham by-election 1938
Party	Candidate	Votes	%	±%
Labour	John Battley	6,366		
Municipal Reform	Norman Bower	6,309		
Majority		57		
Labour gain from Municipal Reform		Swing		

1946 London County Council election: Clapham
Party	Candidate	Votes	%	±%
Labour	Leslie Banks	6,121		
Labour	Alfred Bransom	6,011		
Conservative	William Charles Bonney	4,360		
Conservative	Irene Dowling	4,170		
Liberal	C. E. Paterson	1,010		
Liberal	J. G. Richards	906		
Majority				
Labour gain from Municipal Reform		Swing		
Labour gain from Municipal Reform		Swing		

1949 London County Council election: Clapham
Party	Candidate	Votes	%	±%
Conservative	William Charles Bonney	15,476		
Conservative	Irene Dowling	15,195		
Conservative	Neville Rayner	14,387		
Labour	Leslie Banks	13,670		
Labour	Leah L'Estrange Malone	13,011		
Labour	Albert Samuels	12,593		
Conservative win (new seat)				
Conservative gain from Labour		Swing		
Conservative gain from Labour		Swing		

1952 London County Council election: Clapham
Party	Candidate	Votes	%	±%
Labour	Leslie Banks	16,709		
Labour	James Benjamin Hayward	16,327		
Labour	Christina Lawrence	16,269		
Conservative	W. G. Clark	14,700		
Conservative	Irene Dowling	14,650		
Conservative	Neville Rayner	14,348		
Labour gain from Conservative		Swing		
Labour gain from Conservative		Swing		
Labour gain from Conservative		Swing		

1955 London County Council election: Clapham
Party	Candidate	Votes	%	±%
Conservative	Muriel Gumbel	12,332		
Conservative	Francis Hadwen	12,308		
Conservative	Geoffrey Mowbray	12,165		
Labour	Leslie Banks	12,041		
Labour	C. Lawrence	11,601		
Labour	E. Horton	11,549		
Conservative gain from Labour		Swing		
Conservative gain from Labour		Swing		
Conservative gain from Labour		Swing		

1958 London County Council election: Clapham
Party	Candidate	Votes	%	±%
Labour	Leslie Banks	13,372		
Labour	Winifred Katz	13,030		
Labour	T. D. Cranfield	13,004		
Conservative	Muriel Gumbel	9,286		
Conservative	P. D. Johnson	9,108		
Conservative	Geoffrey Mowbray	9,056		
Labour gain from Conservative		Swing		
Labour gain from Conservative		Swing		
Labour gain from Conservative		Swing		

1961 London County Council election: Clapham
Party	Candidate	Votes	%	±%
Conservative	W. W. Emden	12,216		
Conservative	Ursula Tracey	12,078		
Conservative	Lintorn Highett	12,018		
Labour	Winifred Katz	11,896		
Labour	E. Horstead	11,892		
Labour	C. J. Blau	11,874		
Conservative gain from Labour		Swing		
Conservative gain from Labour		Swing		
Conservative gain from Labour		Swing		
