= Baron Monk Bretton =

Barony in the Peerage of the United Kingdom

Baron Monk Bretton, of Conyboro and Hurstpierpoint in the County of Sussex, is a title in the Peerage of the United Kingdom. It was created by letters patent on 4 November 1884 for the Liberal politician John George Dodson. He was succeeded by his son, the second Baron. He was notably chairman of the London County Council from 1929 to 1930. As of 2022 the title is held by the latter's grandson, the fourth Baron, who succeeded his father in that year.

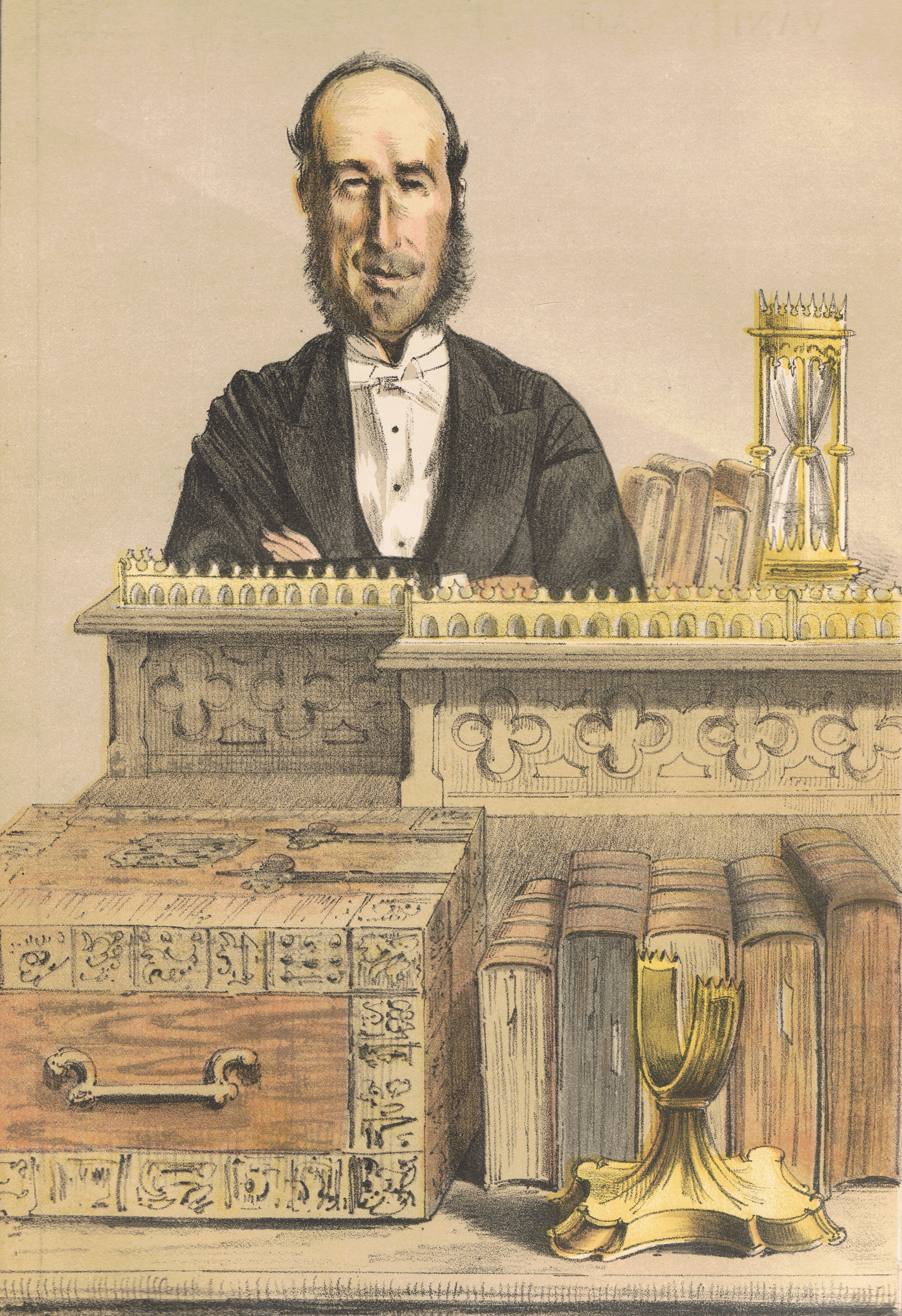
Detail of lithographic reproduction, after James Tissot, published in Vanity Fair, 16 December 1871, showing J. G. Dodson, MP, at his post in the House of Commons, Chairman of Ways and Means, 1865-72.

The judge Sir John Dodson was the father of the first Baron.

== Barons Monk Bretton (1884) ==
- John George Dodson, 1st Baron Monk Bretton (1825–1897)
- John William Dodson, 2nd Baron Monk Bretton (1869–1933)
- John Charles Dodson, 3rd Baron Monk Bretton (1924–2022)
- Christopher Mark Dodson, 4th Baron Monk Bretton (b. 1958)

The heir apparent is his elder son, Hon. Benjamin Charles Dodson (b. 1989)

== Arms ==
Coat of arms of Baron Monk Bretton
Crest Argent, on a fesse raguly plain cotised between six fleurs-de-lis all gules, a sword fesseways point to the dexter proper, pommel and hilt or. Escutcheon Two lion’s jambs erased and in saltire gules, entwined by a serpent, head to the dexter proper. Supporters On either side a female figure proper, vested argent, mantle azure, each resting the exterior hand on an antique shield also azure, adorned gold, that on the dexter charged with a balance suspended, and that on the sinister, with a staff erect entwined by a serpent all or. Motto Benigno Numine Enisus (Successful by favour of Providence)
