= Charles Wetherell =

English lawyer, politician and judge

Sir Charles Wetherell
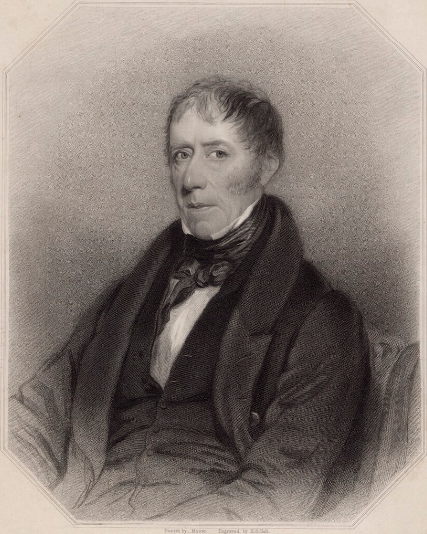

Member of Parliament for Boroughbridge
- In office 1830–1832

Member of Parliament for Plympton Erle
- In office December 1826 – 1830

Member of Parliament for Hastings
- In office 1826 – December 1826

Member of Parliament for Oxford
- In office 1820–1826

Member of Parliament for Shaftesbury
- In office February 1813 – 1818

Member of Parliament for Rye
- In office December 1812 – February 1813

Personal details
- Born: 1770 Oxford, Oxfordshire, England
- Died: 17 August 1846 (aged 75-76) Aylesford, Kent, England
- Spouses: Jane Sarah Elizabeth Croke; Harriet Elizabeth Warneford
- Parent: Nathan Wetherell (father)

Sir Charles Wetherell (1770 – 17 August 1846) was an English lawyer, politician, and judge.

== Life ==
Wetherell was born in Oxford, the third son of Reverend Nathan Wetherell, of Durham, Master of the University College and Vice-Chancellor of the University of Oxford. His mother was Richarda Croke (c.1743-1812), sister of Sir Alexander Croke, of Studley Priory, Oxfordshire. He was educated at St Paul's School, London and matriculated at University College in 1786. He was a demy at Magdalen College, Oxford from 1788 to 1791, graduating B.A. in 1790 and M.A. in 1793.

Wetherell was a Member of Parliament (MP) for a considerable period, representing Rye from 1812 to 1813, Shaftesbury from 1813 to 1818, and Oxford from 1820 to 1826. He was elected MP for Hastings in 1826 but had to stand down when appointed Attorney-General. He represented Plympton Erle from December 1826 to 1830 and Boroughbridge from 1830 to 1832.

He was Solicitor-General between 1824 and 1826 and Attorney General between 20 September 1826 and 27 April 1827, and again between 19 February 1828 and 29 June 1829. In May 1829, Wetherell made a violent speech in opposition to Catholic Emancipation, and was dismissed by the Duke of Wellington. He was Recorder of Bristol during the riots of 1831. From 1835 up to his death in 1846, he was Chancellor of Durham.

== Family ==
Wetherell was twice married, first in 1826, with his cousin Jane Sarah Elizabeth Croke (1804–1831). They had a son, Charles, who died in infancy. In 1838, he married Harriet Elizabeth Warneford (1803-1861), daughter and heiress of Colonel Francis Warneford, of Warneford Place. The marriage was notably unhappy and produced no children; upon his death in 1846 she inherited the bulk of his estate.

Parliament of the United Kingdom
Preceded by Sir Henry Sullivan; Thomas Phillipps Lamb	Member of Parliament for Rye; 1812–1813; With: Thomas Phillipps Lamb	Succeeded by Richard Arkwright; Thomas Phillipps Lamb
Preceded by Richard Bateman-Robson; Hudson Gurney	Member of Parliament for Shaftesbury; 1813–1818; With: Sir Edward Kerrison	Succeeded by John Bacon Sawrey Morritt; Henry John Shepherd
Preceded by John Atkyns-Wright; Frederick St John	Member of Parliament for Oxford; 1820–1826; With: John Ingram Lockhart	Succeeded by James Langston; John Ingram Lockhart
Preceded by James Dawkins; William Scott	Member of Parliament for Hastings; Jun. 1826 – Dec. 1826; With: Sir William Curtis, Bt	Succeeded by Evelyn Denison; James Lushington
Preceded by George Edgcumbe; Gibbs Antrobus	Member of Parliament for Plympton Erle; 1826–1830; With: Gibbs Antrobus	Succeeded by Viscount Valletort; Gibbs Antrobus
Preceded by George Mundy; Henry Dawkins	Member of Parliament for Boroughbridge; 1830–1832; With: Matthias Attwood	Constituency abolished
Legal offices
Preceded by Sir John Copley	Solicitor General for England and Wales; 1824–1826	Succeeded by Sir Nicholas Conyngham Tindal
Preceded by Sir John Copley	Attorney General for England and Wales; 1828–1829	Succeeded by Sir James Scarlett
