= Dexthorpe =

Deserted medieval village in the East Lindsey district of Lincolnshire, England

Coordinates: 53.222692°N 0.108237°E

- Location within Lincolnshire
- OS grid reference: TF408715
  - London: 115 mi (185 km) S
- Civil parish: Dalby
- District: East Lindsey
- Shire county: Lincolnshire
- Region: East Midlands
- Country: England
- Sovereign state: United Kingdom
- Post town: Spilsby
- Postcode district: PE23
- Police: Lincolnshire
- Fire: Lincolnshire
- Ambulance: East Midlands
- UK Parliament: Louth and Horncastle

Dexthorpe is a deserted medieval village in the East Lindsey district of Lincolnshire, England. It is in the parish of Dalby, and 3.5 miles (5.6 km) north from Spilsby, 1 mile (1.6 km) south-west from Ulceby, and 400 yards (366 m) east from the A16 road.

Dexthorpe is listed in the 1086 Domesday Book as part of the Candleshoe Hundred in the South Riding of Lindsey. It held 23 households, 8 villagers, 11 smallholders and 47 freemen, with 16 ploughlands, 2 churches and 80 acres (0.3 km^{2}) of meadow. In 1066 Earl Harold held the Lordship, which in 1086 was granted to Earl Hugh of Chester, who also became Tenant-in-chief. However, by 1577 it had declined and was recorded as having only a pasture, church and parsonage.

In 1829, Edmund Oldfield wrote in his book A topographical and historical account of Wainfleet in the Wapentake of Candleshoe in the County of Lincoln, that "the inhabitants of Dexthorpe pay church rates to the incumbent of Well", and that the number of inhabitants in Dalby and Dexthorpe in 1801 were 50, in 1811 there were 71 and by 1821 had risen again to 99. Today the church and village are visible as earthworks.
