= Peter Browne (MP) =

Irish politician

Peter Browne (1794-1872) was an Irish politician.

Browne was born in Dublin and educated at Trinity College there. He was Member of Parliament (MP) for Rye from 1818 until 1826.

Parliament of the United Kingdom
Preceded by Richard Arkwright	Member of Parliament for Rye; 1818 – 1826; With: Charles Arbuthnot; Thomas Phillipps Lamb; John Dodson; Robert Knight	Succeeded by Henry Bonham (politician)
