= Richard Arkwright (1781–1832) =

English politician

Richard Arkwright (30 September 1781 – 28 March 1832) was an English politician.

He was the oldest son of Richard Arkwright (died 1843) of Willersley Castle, Derbyshire, and grandson of the entrepreneur Sir Richard Arkwright (1732–1792), whose invention of the spinning frame and other industrial innovations made him very wealthy.

Young Richard was educated at Eton and at Trinity College, Cambridge. He and his five brothers were endowed as landed gentry by their father, who gave Richard £30,000 on his marriage in 1803 (equivalent to £3.46 million in 2023). He managed his father's estates at Normanton Turville (near Thurlaston, Leicestershire) and Sutton Scarsdale in Derbyshire.

Living at Normanton Turville, he served as an officer in the yeomanry, and as Member of Parliament for Rye from 1813 to 1818, and from 1826 to 1830.

Parliament of the United Kingdom
Preceded by Thomas Phillipps Lamb; Charles Wetherell	Member of Parliament for Rye; 1813 – 1818; With: Thomas Phillipps Lamb to 1816; John Maberly 1816–18	Succeeded by Charles Arbuthnot; Peter Browne
Preceded by Robert Knight; Peter Browne	Member of Parliament for Rye; 1826 – 1830; With: Henry Bonham 1816–30; Philip Pusey 1830; De Lacy Evans 1830	Succeeded by Francis Robert Bonham; Hugh Duncan Baillie
