= John Dodson (judge) =

English judge

The Right Honourable Sir John Dodson
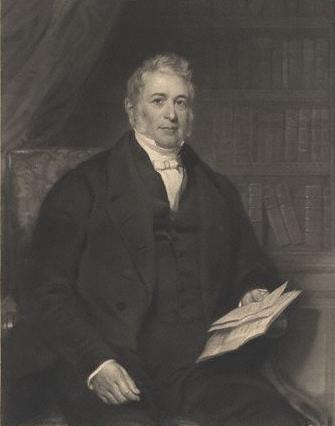
- Born: 19 January 1780; Hurstpierpoint, West Sussex, England
- Died: 27 April 1858 (aged 78); Mayfair, London
- Occupation: Judge
- Spouse: Frances Priscilla Pearson

Sir John Dodson (19 January 1780 – 27 April 1858) was an English judge, aka Dean of Arches, and member of parliament.

== Life ==
Dodson was born at Hurstpierpoint on 19 January 1780. He was the eldest son of the Rev. Dr. John Dodson (1734–1807), rector of Yoxall, Staffordshire, and then rector of Hurstpierpoint, West Sussex, who died in July 1807. He entered Merchant Taylors' School in 1790, and proceeded to Oriel College, Oxford, in 1797, where he graduated B.A. 1801, M.A. 1804, Middle Temple 1807 (called to the bar 1834), and D.C.L. 1808. He was admitted an advocate of the College of Doctors of Laws (Doctors' Commons) 3 November 1808, and acted as commissary to the dean and chapter of Westminster from 1808. A civil lawyer and editor of the Admiralty Reports 1811–22. Dodson died at 6 Seamore Place, Mayfair, London, 27 April 1858. For many years before that he had lived at 12 Hertford street, Mayfair.

== Career ==
From July 1819 to March 1823 he sat for Rye in parliament as, essentially, a Tory member, on death of its patron Thomas Phillipps Lamb, (?1752–1819), of Mountsfield Lodge, Rye, of the family of Rye's Lamb House. On 11 March 1829 he was appointed by the Duke of Wellington to the office of advocate to the Admiralty Court, and on being named advocate-general, 15 October 1834, was knighted at St. James's Palace on the 29th of the same month. As J. M. Collinge puts it: 'He voted in the (Tory) government majority on the blasphemous libels bill, 23 December 1819, and later received all his major legal appointments from Tory ministries. He is not known to have spoken in the House before 1820.'

He was called to the bar at the Middle Temple 8 November 1834, Admiralty Advocate 1829–34, and King's Advocate 1834–52, 1835 he was elected a bencher of his inn, Middle Temple, and reader in 1838, treasurer 1841. He became master of the faculties in November 1841, and vicar-general to the lord primate (archbishop of Canterbury) in 1849–52. From February 1852 he was judge of the prerogative court of Canterbury (PCC) until the abolition of this jurisdiction on 9 December 1857. He was dean of the Arches Court till his death. Herbert Jenner-Fust preceded him as Dean, and both were painted by F. Y. Frederick Yeates Hurlstone. He was sworn a privy councillor 5 April 1852. Knighted 29 October 1834.

== Family ==
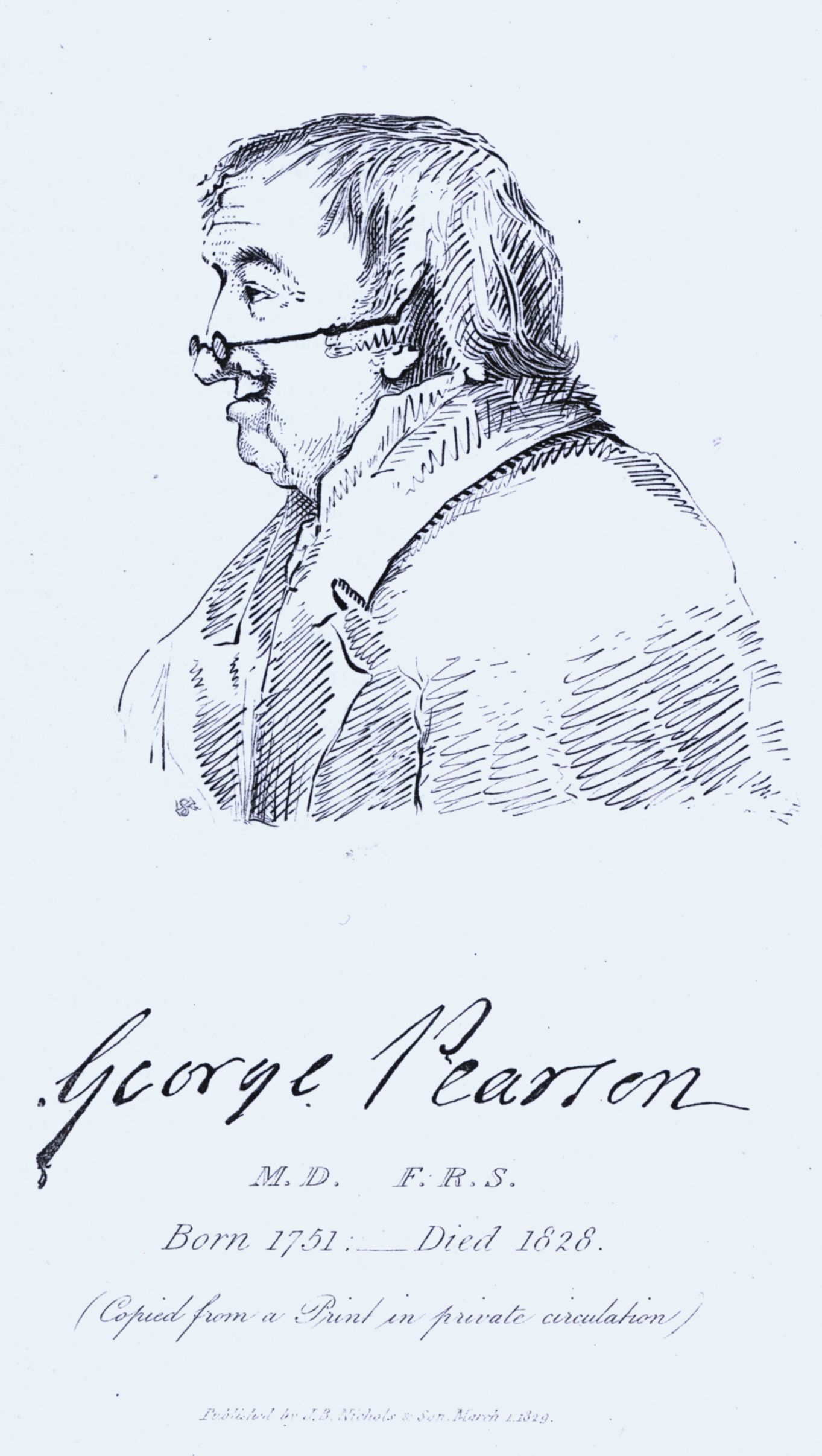
George Pearson (1751–1828), MD, FRS. Dodson's father-in-law.

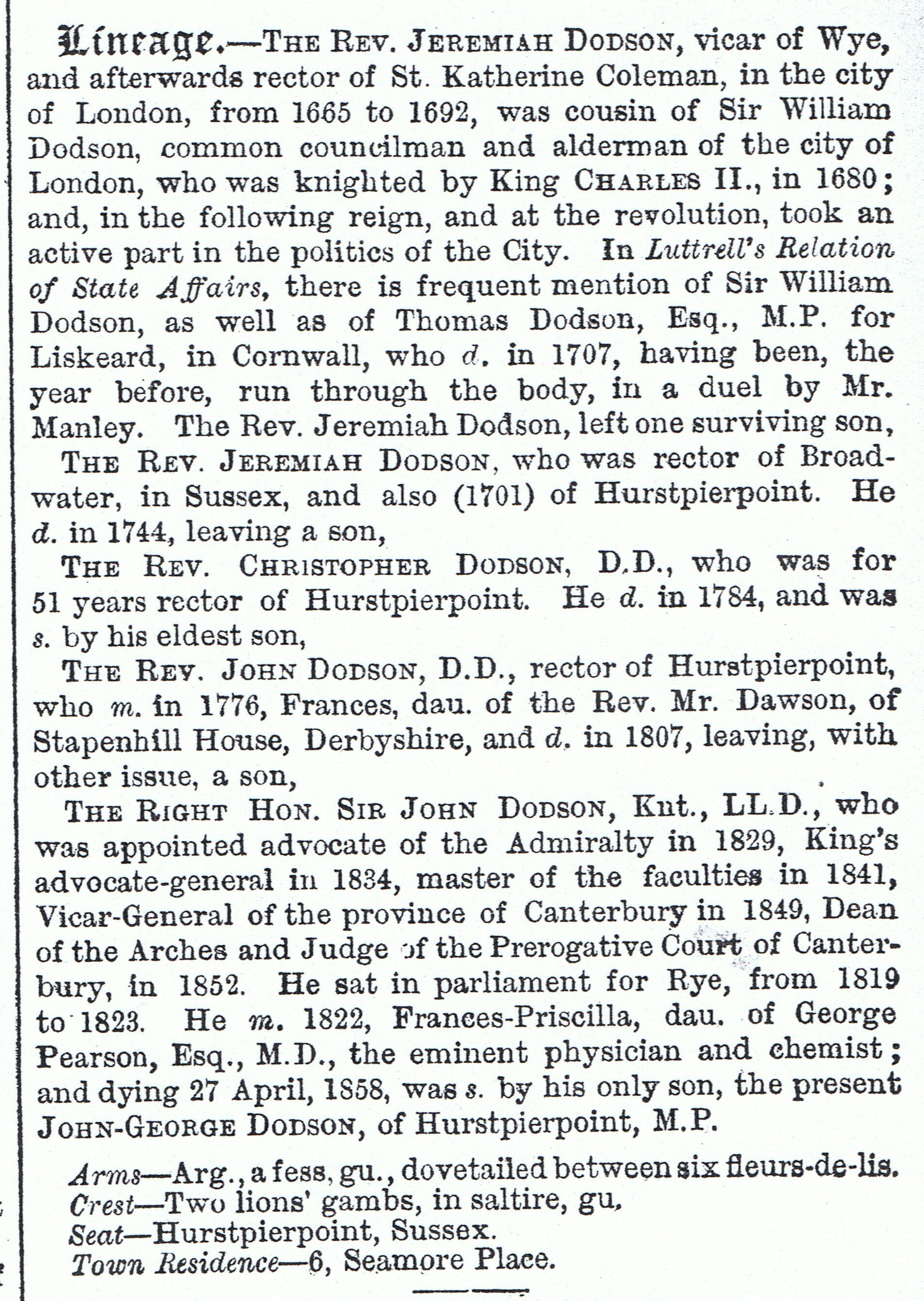
From 1863 Burke's Landed Gentry.

His father the Rev. John Dodson (1734–1807), BD (1768), DD (1772), matriculated Trinity College (1749), Oxford, MA Oriel College (1756) & fellow; vicar of Cubbington, Warwickshire; (his brother Charles was also vicar of Cubbington and when curate of Leek Wootton where he lived he helped James Wilmot of Kenilworth); rector of Yoxall (1768–84), Staffordshire, and then rector (1785/88-1805) of Hurstpierpoint, West Sussex, and died in July 1807, having married in 1776 Frances (1750–1832), (buried Church of St Chad, Lichfield, Staffordshire), daughter of the Rev. Mr. John Dawson (c.1704–1767, matric. University college, Oxford; Ordained 1729; of Stapenhill, Burton-upon-Trent, Stanton Drew, and Broughton Sulney, Nottinghamshire), by his wife Susannah.

Dodson married Frances-Priscilla Pearson (1788–1869), eldest daughter and co-heir of George Pearson, MD, of London and Tyers Hill, Darfield, (then) in the West Riding of Yorkshire, on 24 December 1822. His only son, John George Dodson, barrister, of Lincoln's Inn, was elected M.P. for East Sussex in April 1857 and was created Lord Monk Bretton in 1884.

Dodson's grandfather, the venerable and pious Rev. Christopher Dodson (1705–1784, aged 78), an Eton scholar (1719–23), admitted pensioner Clare College, Cambridge 28 May 1724, and rector of Hurstpierpoint for 51 years, married on 24 August 1731 at Wivelsfield to Mary (1713-1747/8, aged 35), the daughter of Thomas Marchant, gent, of Little Park, Ninfield. His great-grandfather was the Rev Jeremiah Dodson II (1673–1744), rector of Broadwater, Sussex before he became rector of Hurstpierpoint in 1701. Jeremiah married Anne (d.1745), daughter of Christopher Todd, apothecary of the Market, of St. Faith, London, in St Ann Blackfriars, St. Andrew-by-the-Wardrobe, April 1701. Both are buried in Broadwater, where there is (or was in 1883) a slab monumental inscription.

== His great-great-grandfather ==
His great-great-grandfather was Rev. Jeremiah (Jeremy) Dodson I (d.1695), who was perpetual curate of Wye, Kent from 1660 or 1662 and by 1665 rector of St Katherine Coleman, Coleman Street, Fenchurch street, London. He married secondly in 1663 Elinor Ryves (d.1668), daughter of the Ven. John Ryves, and granddaughter of Robert Tounson, and then thirdly in 1669 Margaret (d.1689), daughter of Randolph (or Randall) Isaacson, merchant, of St. Katharine Coleman, by whom came his, seemingly, surviving son Rev. Jeremiah Dodson II.

Randolph Issacson was one of the 17 children of Henry Isaacson (1581–1654), (by Elizabeth, daughter of John Fan, leather-seller), of St. Katherine Coleman, who was of a family with a Sheffield origin, but was a citizen and Painter-stainer of London (of which company he was a warden and was its Master in 1633 & 1639, following his uncle Pawle Isaacson, who was master in 1627). Henry Isaacson was also treasurer and amanuensis to Lord Bishop Lancelot Andrewes, publishing a life of Andrewes in 1650, having in 1633 produced his own Saturni Ephemerides, or the chronological history of the four kingdoms: see ODNB).

Randolph Isaacson's wife Margaret was the daughter of Robert Shawe II, son of Robert Shaw, vintner, of St. George's, Southwark, Surrey), and brother of Sir John Shaw, Bt., of Broad street, London and Eltham Lodge, (designed by Hugh May), Kent, and of Hurstpierpoint, Sussex. Hurstpierpoint was granted to John Shaw, with a baronetcy, by Charles II, in return for money lent to him during his exile, which connection was of great importance to later generations of Dodsons as three members were incumbents (rectors) there 1707–1807.

Jeremiah Dodson was author of A Sermon Preached at the Funeral Obsequies of Jacob Lucie Esq. [1627-c1685] late Alderman of the City of London, in the Parish-church of St. Katherine Coleman, November, 20th, 1688. He was president of Sion College in 1689.

Dodson's brother-in-law, his wife Margaret's brother, James Isaacson (1660–1724), was MP for Banbury 1698–99. Commissioner stamp duty 1694–1702; King's warehouse keeper of the customs, port of London c.1696–before 1702; commissioner of customs [Scotland] 1707–9, Governor of the Friendly Society for Widows 1696. His parliamentary career came to an abrupt end on 10 February 1699 when he was expelled from the House.

Dodson was a contemporary and first cousin of Sir William Dodson (1639–1695), woollen draper, even the King's woollen draper, of Kensington, formerly of St Paul's churchyard, (Castle Baynard), (Tory) Alderman of London and sometime militia captain who was knighted in 1680. In 1682 he was a steward at the Feast of the Artillery Company of London. He was Master Merchant Taylor in 1686 and in November 1667, at St. Mary-le-Strand, Westminster, he had married Elizabeth Brewer (1633–1696), widow of fishmonger John Briscoe (d.1665), but they had no children and he left his estate to his brother John. He was buried in the south aisle of the nave of Westminster Abbey on 16 October 1695, his gravestone was removed when the nave was re-paved in 1834 but the inscription read: "Here lyeth interred the body of Sir William Dodson, Knight. Obiit 9 Oct. A.D. 1695".

== Three brothers and sister ==
Rev. William (St. John's, Oxford), BA (1804), MA (1808), BD (1817), was vicar of Edlington, Lincolnshire, and rector of Dexthorpe and Claxby (Claseby) from 1817, and died in 1852. Reverend William Dodson, who had married Thomas Phillips Lamb's eldest daughter Elizabeth, was thus a freeman and jurat of Rye (see Lamb House). His second son John George Dodson matriculated at Oriel College, Oxford in June 1837, aged 19. His third son Rev. Paul Augustus Dodson (c.1819–) matriculated at Worcester College, Oxford in 1838. His daughter Elizabeth Dorothy Dodson (c1814-1874) married (1842) Rev. Baron Francis de Paravicini (1816–1897), rector of Avening (1857–97), and uncle of Percy de Paravicini.

Nathaniel Dodson (c1787-1867), matriculated St. John's College, Oxford, 14 December 1805 aged 18; BA 1809, MA 1812, proctor 1819; Rector of Buttermere, Wiltshire, 1818 and Vicar St Helens, Abingdon, 1824–67, prebend of Lincoln. Appointed by the Archdeacon of Oxford in August 1831, 'a Surrogate for granting marriage licenses, probates of wills, &c., within the diocese of Oxford'.

Christopher Dodson (c1793-1876), matriculated University College, Oxford, 3 April 1810, aged 17; BA 1813, MA 1817, Rector of Grateley 1819, and of Penton Mewsey, Hants (1832 to death 24 April 1876). Sometime domestic Chaplain: Maria, Countess of Guildford, and Louisa, Countess of Craven. Chairman of the Andover Union Board of (Poor Law) Guardians at the time of the Andover workhouse scandal

His sister Frances Dodson married Rev. John Constable (1779–1863) of Middleham House, vicar of Ringmer (1812–), (son of Rev Richard Constable of Cowfold (1756–1839): Vicar of Selmeston 1785–1801, Vicar of Heathfield 1785–1801, Prebend of Chichester 1796–1839, Vicar of Cowfold 1801–39, and Vicar of Hailsham 1805–39, and prebend of Wisborough).

== Works ==
Dodson was concerned in the following works:

1. A Report of the Case of Dalrymple the Wife against Dalrymple the Husband, 1811.
2. Reports of Cases argued and determined in the High Court of Admiralty, 1811–22, London, 1815–1828, another ed. 1853.
3. A Report of the Case of the Louis appealed from the Admiralty Court at Sierra Leone, and determined in the High Court of Admiralty, 1817.
4. A Digested Index of the Cases determined in the High Court of Admiralty, contained in the Reports of Robinson, Edwards, and Dodson, by Joshua Greene, 1818.
5. A Report of the Judgment in the Case of Sullivan against Sullivan, falsely called Oldacre, 1818.
6. Lawful Church Ornaments, by J. W. Perry. With an Appendix on the Judgment of the Right Hon. Sir J. Dodson in the appeal Liddell v. Westerton, 1857.
7. A Review of the Judgment of Sir John Dodson in the case of Liddell v. Westerton, by C. F. Trower, 1857.
8. The Judgment of the Right Hon. Sir J. Dodson, also the Judgment of the Judicial Committee of the Privy Council in the case of Liddell and Horne against Westerton, by A. F. Bayford, 1857.

Parliament of the United Kingdom
Preceded by Thomas Phillipps Lamb; Peter Browne	Member of Parliament for Rye; 1819 – 1823; With: Peter Browne	Succeeded by Robert Knight; Peter Browne
