= Charles Jackson (antiquary) =

English banker & antiquarian (1809–1882)

- Born: 25 July 1809
- Died: 1 December 1882 (aged 73); Doncaster, Yorkshire, England
- Occupations: Banker, Antiquary
- Spouse: Hugh Parker
- Children: 8
- Parents: James Jackson (father); Henrietta Priscilla (mother)
- Relatives: John Edward Jackson (brother)

Charles Jackson (1809–1882) was an English banker and antiquary.

== Life ==
Born on 25 July 1809, he came from a family connected with Doncaster, where both his grandfather and his father were mayors. He was the third son of the large family of James Jackson, banker, by Henrietta Priscilla, second daughter of Freeman Bower of Bawtry; John Edward Jackson was an elder brother. In 1829, he was admitted to Lincoln's Inn and was called to the bar there in 1834.

Jackson settled as a banker in Doncaster. He was treasurer of the borough from 1838 and trustee of a number of institutions, taking a large part in establishing the Doncaster Free Library. He suffered heavy losses in the bank failure of Overend, Gurney, & Co.

Jackson died at Doncaster on 1 December 1882. By his marriage with a daughter of Hugh Parker of Woodthorpe, Yorkshire, he left four sons and four daughters.

== Works ==
Jackson's major work was Doncaster Charities, Past and Present (1881, Worksop), which had been written long before. For the Surtees Society he edited:

- The Diary of Abraham de la Pryme, the Yorkshire Antiquary (1870);
- the Autobiography of Mrs. A. Thornton (1873); and
- Yorkshire Diaries and Autobiographies of the 17th and 18th Centuries (1877)

He was engaged at the time of his death in editing for the society a memoir of the Priestley family.

Jackson also contributed to the Yorkshire Archæological Journal a paper on Sir Robert Swift and a memoir of the Rev. Thomas Broughton, as well as papers on local muniments (abstracts of deeds in the possession of James Montagu of Melton-on-the-Hill) and on the Stovin Manuscripts.

== Notes ==
Attribution

This article incorporates text from a publication now in the public domain: Lee, Sidney, ed. (1892). "Jackson, Charles". Dictionary of National Biography. Vol. 29. London: Smith, Elder & Co.
