= John Edward Jackson (antiquarian) =

English clergyman (1805–1891)

John Edward Jackson (12 November 1805 – 6 March 1891) was an English clergyman of the Church of England, antiquary, and archivist.

== Life ==
Born on 12 November 1805, Jackson was second son of James Jackson, a banker, of Doncaster, by Henrietta Priscilla, second daughter of Freeman Bower; Charles Jackson was a younger brother. He was educated at Charterhouse School, matriculated at Brasenose College, Oxford on 9 April 1823, graduated B.A. with second-class classical honours in 1827, and proceeded to M.A. in 1830.

In 1834 he was ordained curate of Farleigh Hungerford, Somerset. In 1845 he became rector of Leigh Delamere with Sevington, Wiltshire, and in 1846 vicar of Norton Coleparle in the same county. He was also a rural dean and in 1855 became an honorary canon of Bristol Cathedral.

He was greatly interested in geology, and his collection of fossils was left to the Wiltshire Archaeological and Natural History Society, of which he was a founder member, and became secretary and then editor of its magazine. But he later became more interested in history and topography, which were the subject of most of his published works. The most important of these was The Topographical Collections of John Aubrey (1862), which greatly extended the work on which it was based.

Jackson was a Fellow of the Society of Antiquaries of London. He was librarian to the Marquess of Bath, and arranged and indexed the bulk of the manuscripts at Longleat House. He published a number of these manuscripts. Longleat Papers A.D. 1553–1588 appeared in 1872, and two of his papers have appendices with relevant documents from the Longleat archives: Wulfhall and the Seymours (1874); and Amye Robsart (1877).

== Personal life ==
In 1851, he was living alone with a housekeeper and a housemaid. In 1861, he was at the Parsonage, Leigh Delamere, with two nephews both aged fifteen, a housekeeper, and a housemaid.

He died in March 1891, leaving a personal estate valued at £34,505, equivalent to £3,790,445 in 2025. His executors were two of his nephews, John Houlton Jackson, a senior clerk in the War Office, and Morton Strode Jackson, a principal clerk in the Inland Revenue Office.

== Works ==
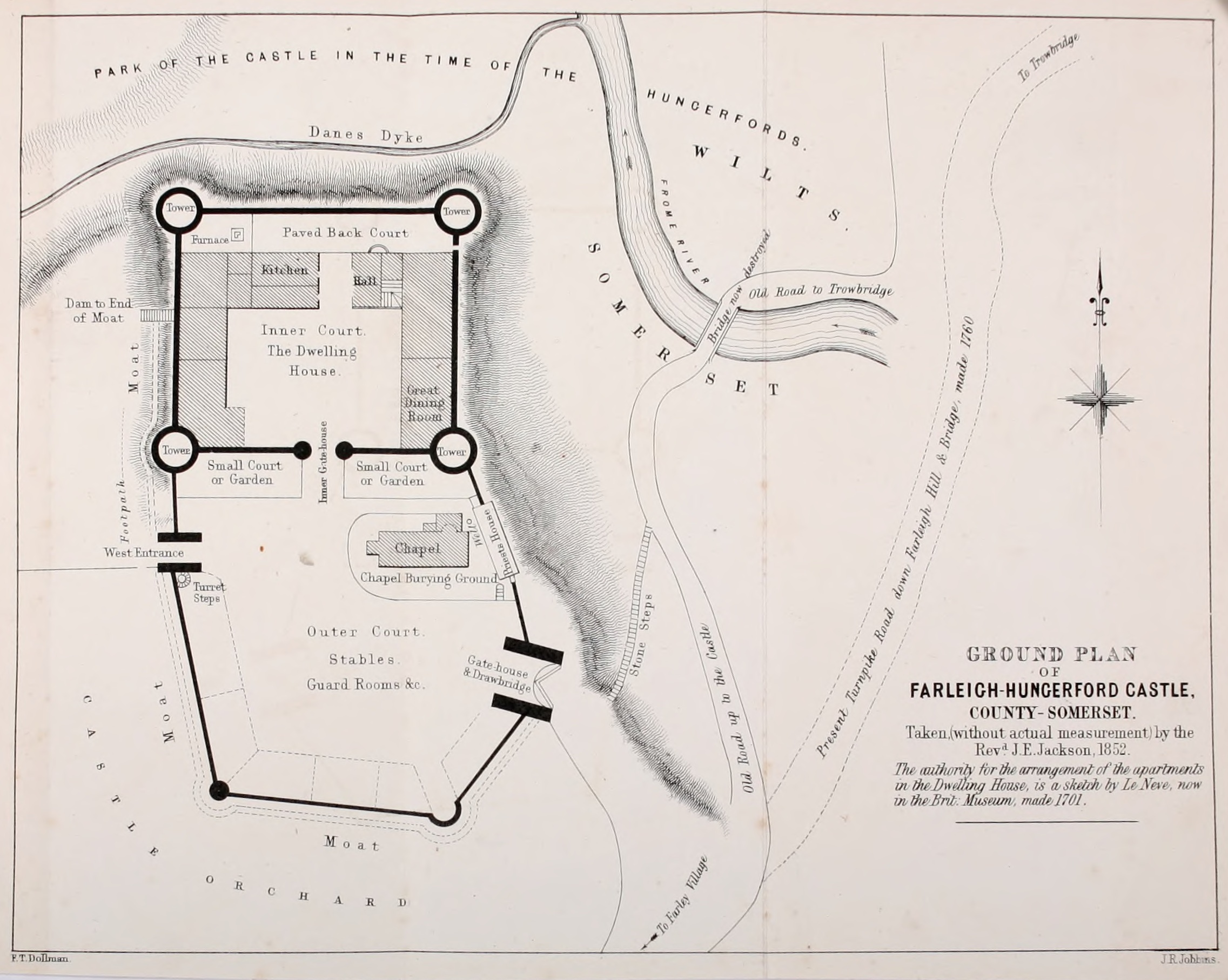
Plan of Farleigh Hungerford Castle, drawn by Jackson in 1852

Jackson's published works were:

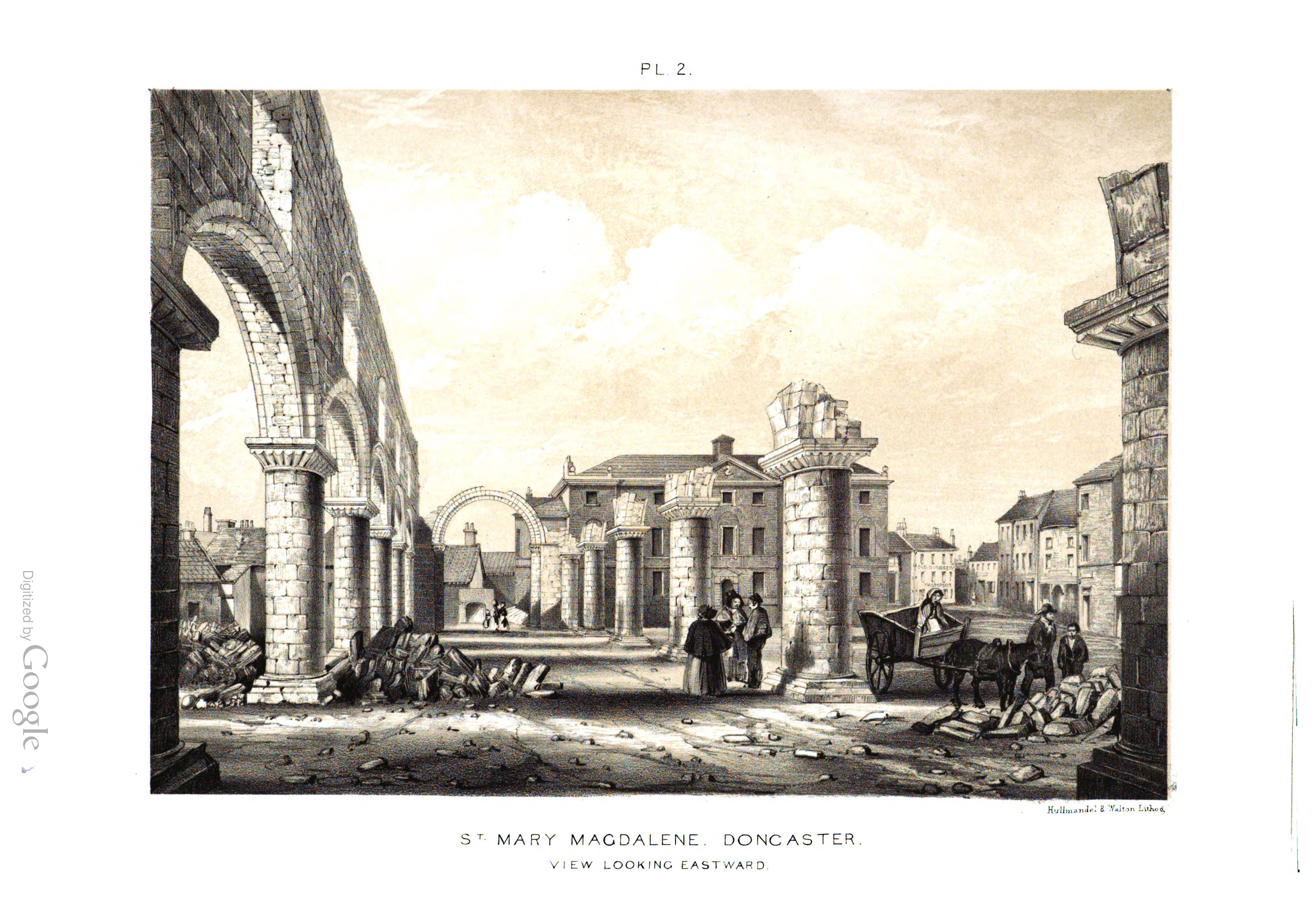
The ruined church of St Mary Magdalene, Doncaster

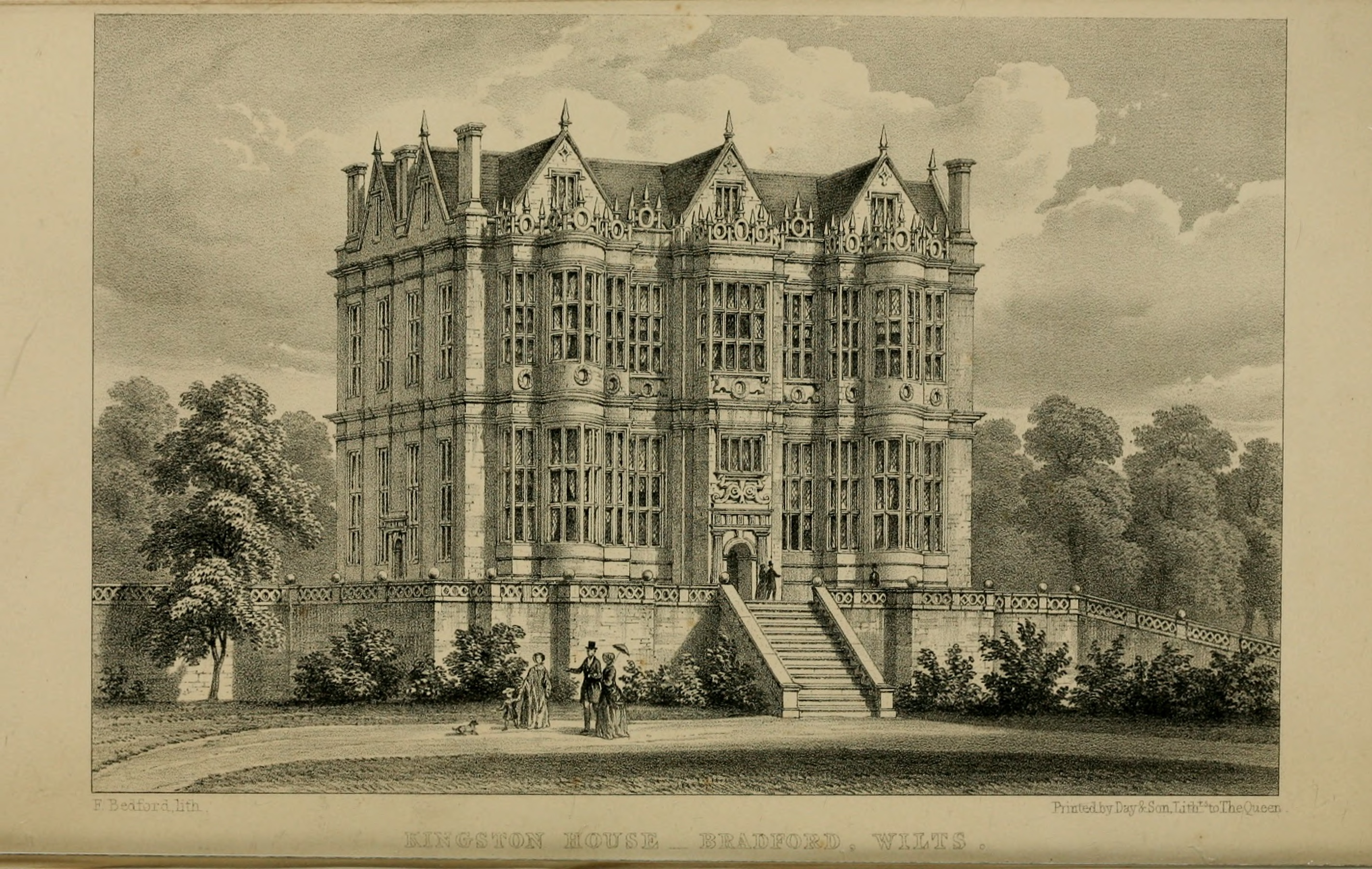
Kingston House or The Hall, Bradford-on-Avon

- The History of Grittleton, co. Wilts, 1843, for the Wilts Topographical Society.
- "Farleigh-Hungerford Castle, Somerset". Proceedings of the Somersetshire Archaeological and Natural History Society. 3: 114–124. 1853.
- A Guide to Farleigh-Hungerford, co. Somerset, Taunton, 1853 Third edition 1879.
- History of the ruined Church of St. Mary Magdalene, Doncaster, London, 1853.
- Maud Heath's Causey, Devizes, 1854.
- Murder of Henry Long, Esq., A.D. 1594, Devizes, 1854.
- "Kingston House, Bradford". Wiltshire Archaeology and Natural History Magazine. 1: 265–301. 1854. Reprinted in 1907, together with a description of Bradford-on-Avon. The house is now known as The Hall, Bradford-on-Avon.
- Leland's Journey Through Wiltshire, AD 1540–42, 1854.
- History and Description of St. George's Church at Doncaster, London, 1855.
- On the Hungerford Chapels in Salisbury Cathedral, Devizes, 1855.
- A List of Wiltshire Sheriffs, Devizes, 1856.
- "Ambresbury Monastery". Wiltshire Archaeology and Natural History Magazine. 10: 61–84. 1866. Ambresbury is now known as Amesbury.
- History of Longleat, Devizes, 1857; 2nd ed., 1868.
- The History of the Parish of Kington St. Michael, co. Wilts, Devizes, 1857.
- The History of the Priory of Monkton Farley, Wilts, Devizes, 1857.
- Swindon and its Neighbourhood, Devizes, 1861.
- Malmesbury, Devizes, 1863.
- Devizes, Devizes, 1864.
- "Charles, Lord Stourton, and the Murder of the Hartgills, January 1557". Wiltshire Archaeology and Natural History Magazine. 8: 242–231. 1864.
- "Ancient Chapels &c., in co. Wilts". Wiltshire Archaeology and Natural History Magazine. 10: 253–322. 1867.
- "Rowley, alias Wittenham, co. Wilts". Wiltshire Archaeology and Natural History Magazine. 13: 228–251. 1872. Wittenham and Rowley are now part of the parish of Wingfield.
- Wulfhall and the Seymours. With an appendix of original documents discovered at Longleat. Privately printed, 1874.
- "Amye Robsart". Wiltshire Archaeology and Natural History Magazine. 17: 47–93. 1877. An account of the life and death of Amy Robsart, wife of Robert Dudley, 1st Earl of Leicester.
- "John of Padua". Wiltshire Archaeology and Natural History Magazine. 23: 14–31. 1886.

As editor:

- Leland's Journey Through Wiltshire, AD 1540-42: With Notes; and Another Work. Henry Bull. 1854.
- Wiltshire: The Topographical Collections of John Aubrey, F. R. S., A. D. 1659-70, with Illustrations. Printed and sold for the Society by H. Bull. 1862.
- "Longleat Papers A.D. 1553-1588". Wiltshire Archaeology and Natural History Magazine. 14: 192–216 and 237–253. 1872.
- The history of the town of Malmesbury and of its ancient abbey, revised by J.E. Jackson and M.E.C. Walcott. 1876.
- Liber Henrici de Soliaco: An inquisition of the manors of Glastonbury Abbey, of the year 1189. J.B. Nichols and Sons. 1882.

Kingston House, Leland's Journey Through Wiltshire; History of Longleat, History of the Priory of Monkton Farley, On the Hungerford Chapels, Maud Heath's Causey, Murder of Henry Long, Wiltshire Sheriffs and The History of Kington St. Michael were published together in 1854 as Wiltshire Essays.

== Notes ==
Attribution

- This article incorporates text from a publication now in the public domain: Lee, Sidney, ed. (1892). "Jackson, John Edward". Dictionary of National Biography. Vol. 29. London: Smith, Elder & Co.
