= Pyecombe =

Village and parish in West Sussex, England

Coordinates: 50.89883°N 0.16394°W

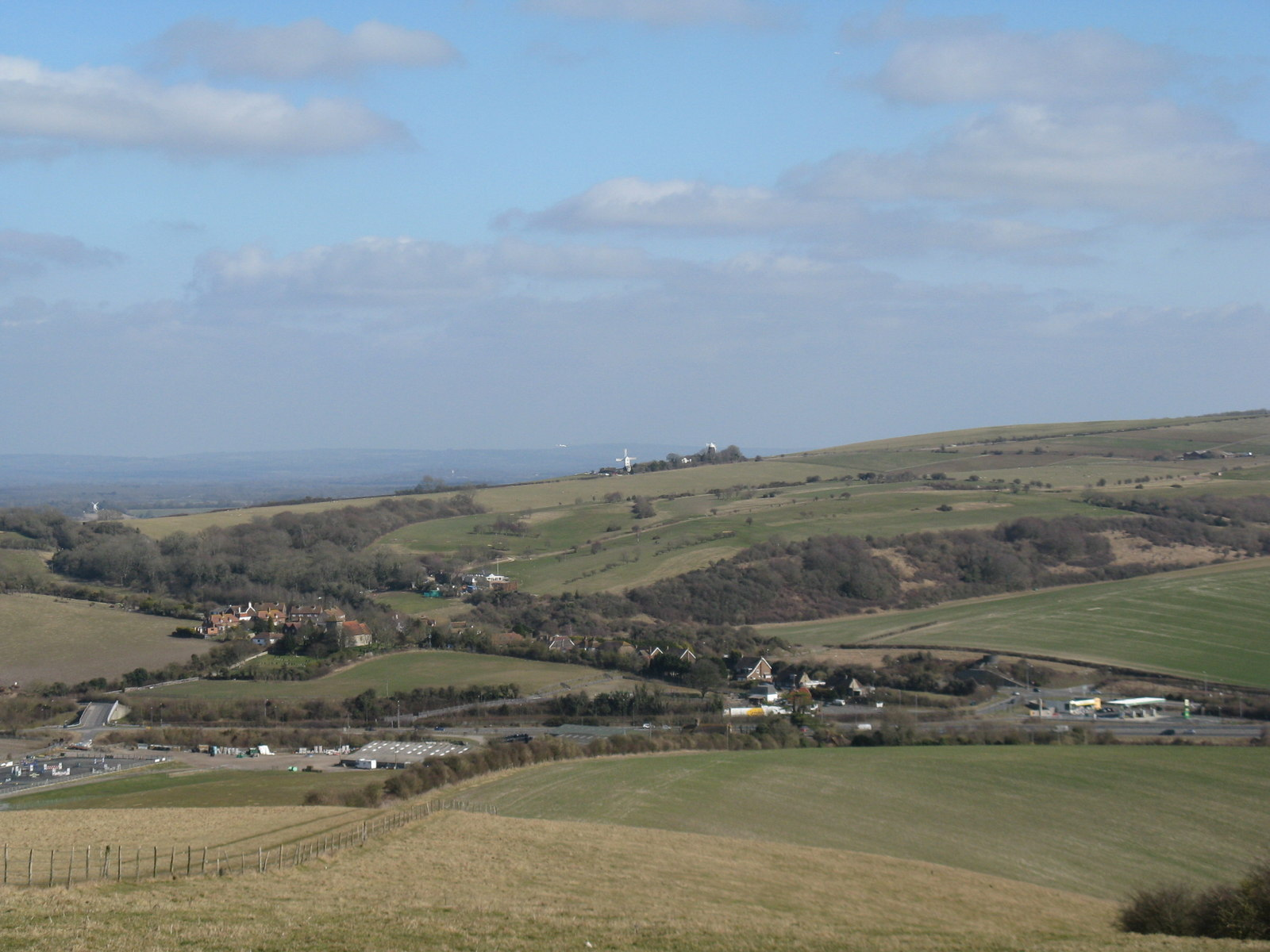

- Location within West Sussex
- Area: 8.87 km^{2} (3.42 sq mi)
- Population: 200 2001 Census; 237 (2011 Census)
  - Density: 23/km^{2} (60/sq mi)
- OS grid reference: TQ292126
  - London: 42 miles (68 km) N
- Civil parish: Pyecombe
- District: Mid Sussex
- Shire county: West Sussex
- Region: South East
- Country: England
- Sovereign state: United Kingdom
- Post town: BRIGHTON
- Postcode district: BN45
- Dialling code: 01273
- Police: Sussex
- Fire: West Sussex
- Ambulance: South East Coast
- UK Parliament: Arundel and South Downs
- Website: Pycombe

Pyecombe is a village and civil parish in the Mid Sussex District of West Sussex, England. Pyecombe is located 7 miles (11 km) to the north of Brighton. The civil parish covers an area of 887 hectares (2,190 acres) and had a population of 200 in the 2001 census, increasing at the 2011 Census to a population of 237.

The parish lies wholly with the South Downs National Park. The planning authority for Pyecombe is the South Downs National Park Authority (SDNPA), the statutory planning authority for the National Park area.

== History ==
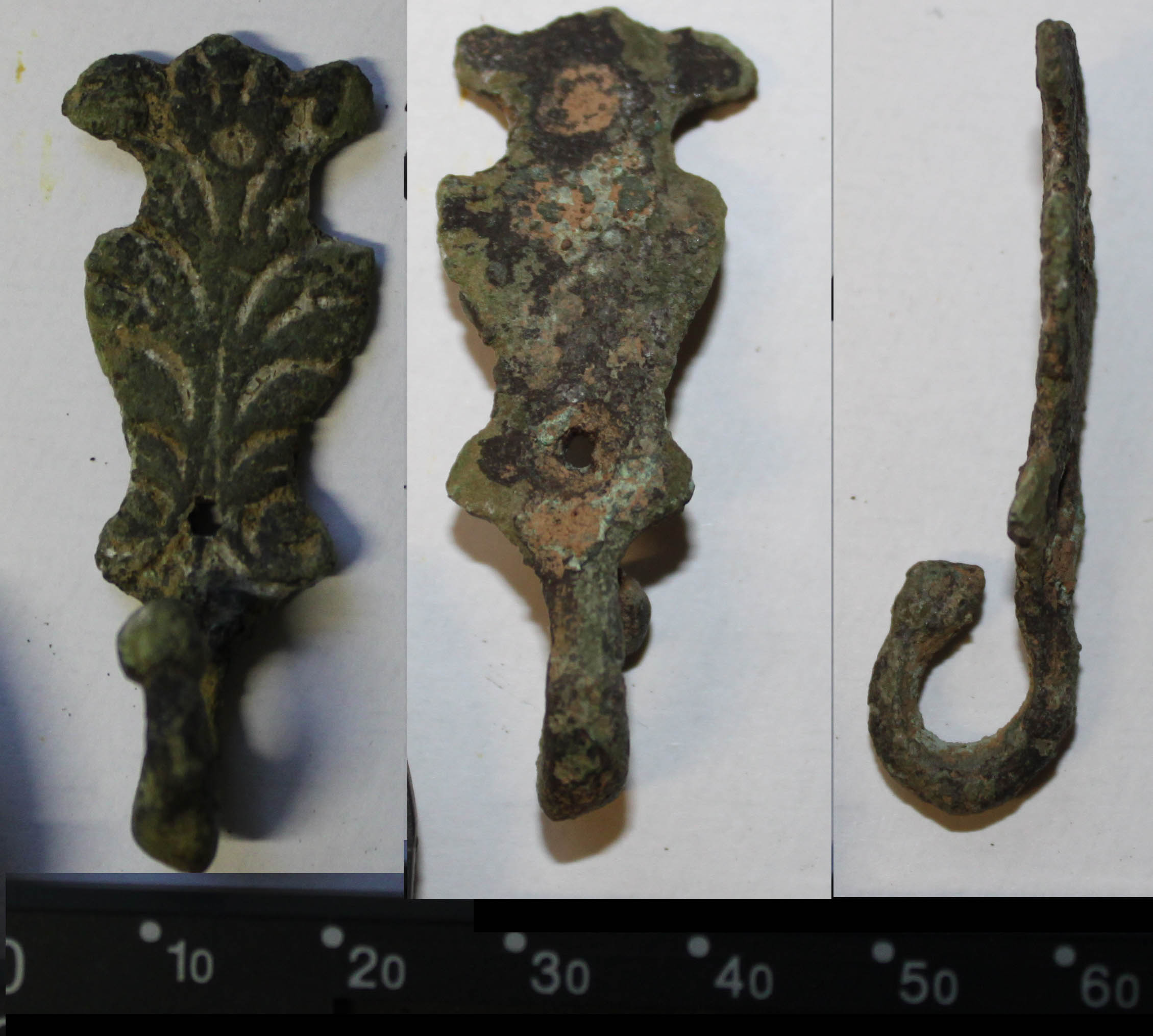
Postmedieval sword belt hanger found in Pyecombe

The name Pyecombe may derive from the Old English pīc, meaning "point" or "pike", and cumb, meaning "coomb" or "valley", in which case it may mean "valley marked by a projecting hill"; alternatively, it may mean "insect valley", from the Old English pēo, "insect, parasite". The parish of Pyecombe comprises two settlements, one called 'Pyecombe' and the other 'Pyecombe Street'. These are about a quarter of a mile apart. The reason for the gap between the two parts of the village is unclear but it is generally thought to be a consequence of plague in the 17th century which necessitated the temporary abandonment of the main settlement and its church.

Pyecombe village lies on the London to Brighton Way Roman road, as well as on 18th and 19th century turnpike roads over Clayton Hill.

The Crown Estate owned the c. 4000 acre Poynings Estate between the Norman Conquest and 1980s. The estate covered many farms in the Weald and on the Downs at Fulking, Poynings and Pyecombe. In 1984 it went up for sale. Some have noted that if the estate had entered public ownership it would have been at the heart of the South Downs National Park and could have been driving forward sustainable farming and landscape restoration. Instead tenant farmers bought it and one of the purchasers now farms 1,500 acres.

Parts of the estate, including Wolstonbury Hill, were common land, Pycombe Common, right up until 1872 when the area was victim to one of the very last usages of the inclosure act in Sussex.

== Notable buildings and areas ==
Notable areas around Pyecombe

The parish lies wholly with the South Downs National Park and is the site of rich biodiversity. Opposite the church is the old forge where the Pyecombe hook was first made in the 19th century by Mr Berry, the blacksmith. The village inn is the Plough; and there is The Three Greys riding school and Brendon Stud in the locality.

=== The Church of the Transfiguration ===
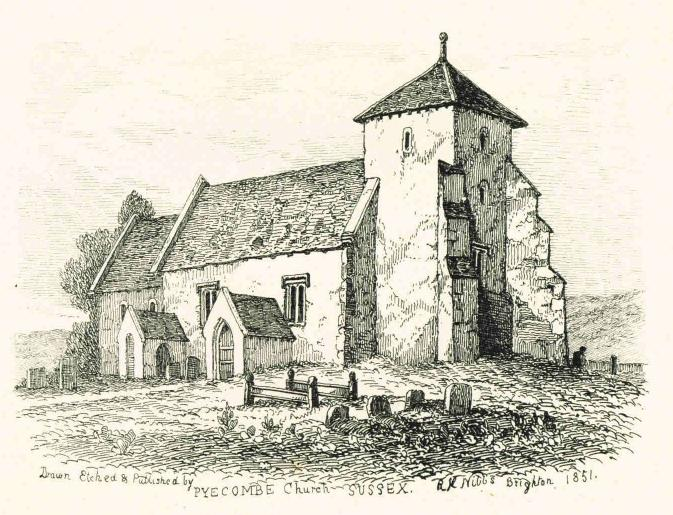
Pyecombe Church, R. H. Nibbs

The Church of the Transfiguration is the Church of England parish church of Pyecombe. The chancel and nave are 12th century; the tower was built in the 13th century. A small kitchen / toilet extension was built on the south side of the church in 2014, finished in flint to match the rest of the church. The extension won the Sussex Heritage Trust ecclesiastical award in 2015. The church is a Grade I listed building, described in the National Heritage List for England as an ‘Attractive small medieval building’.

=== Wolstonbury Hill ===
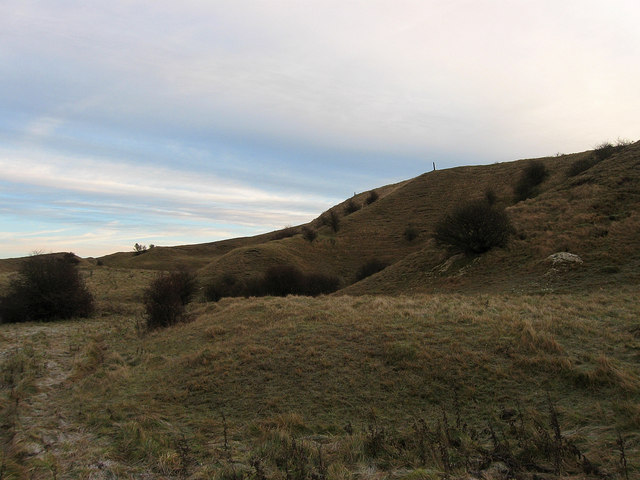
Quarry, Wolstonbury Hill

Wolstonbury Hill is a chalk prominence located within the parish, owned and maintained by the National Trust. It is the location of four scheduled monuments and a Site of Special Scientific Interest. It is perhaps one of the most spectacular looking Downs in the area. To the south is Pycombe and Pycombe Street, to the east is Crabtree Shaw and a big chalk pit, to the north is the Ashen Plantation and to the east is Wellcombe Bottom. There are a number of tracks up to the summit including paths from Crabtree Bottom, Danny House, Clayton and Pycombe. At least twelve native orchid species have been found in the area.

==== Wellcombe Bottom ====
Wellcombe Bottom (TQ 292 136) like the rest of Wolstonbury Hill is owned by the National Trust. At the Trust's request, Friends of Wolstonbury, between 2007 and 2010, cleared scrub in the valley. The area is now rich in meadow flowers and the insects and butterflies that thrive on them. Seven native orchids can be found at Wellcombe Bottom in an area locally known as the "Orchid Bank".

=== The Cow Down ===
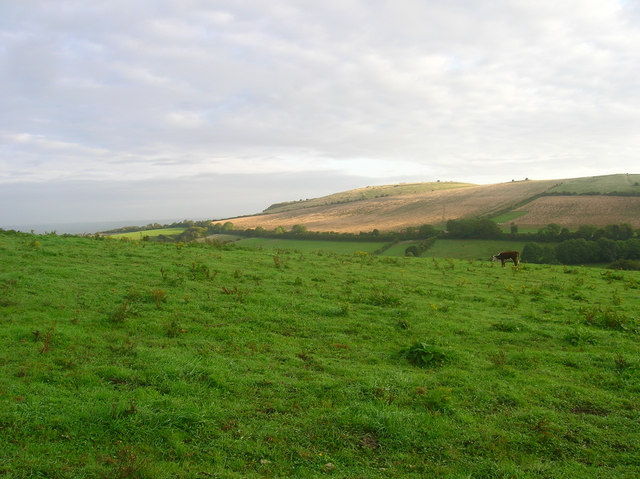
Wolstonbury Hill from Cow Down

The Cow Down (TQ 281 123) is east of Newtimber Hill and south west of the A23 and Wostonbury Hill. Until 1872 it was one of the three commons of Pyecombe and the public dimension is once again recognized by its designation as Access Land. There are old anthills, wild marjoram, knapweed, betony and Devil's bit scabious and the blue butterflies that thrive on them. The rare snail, Monacha cartusiana, has been recorded on the Down.

=== Pyecombe Golf Course ===
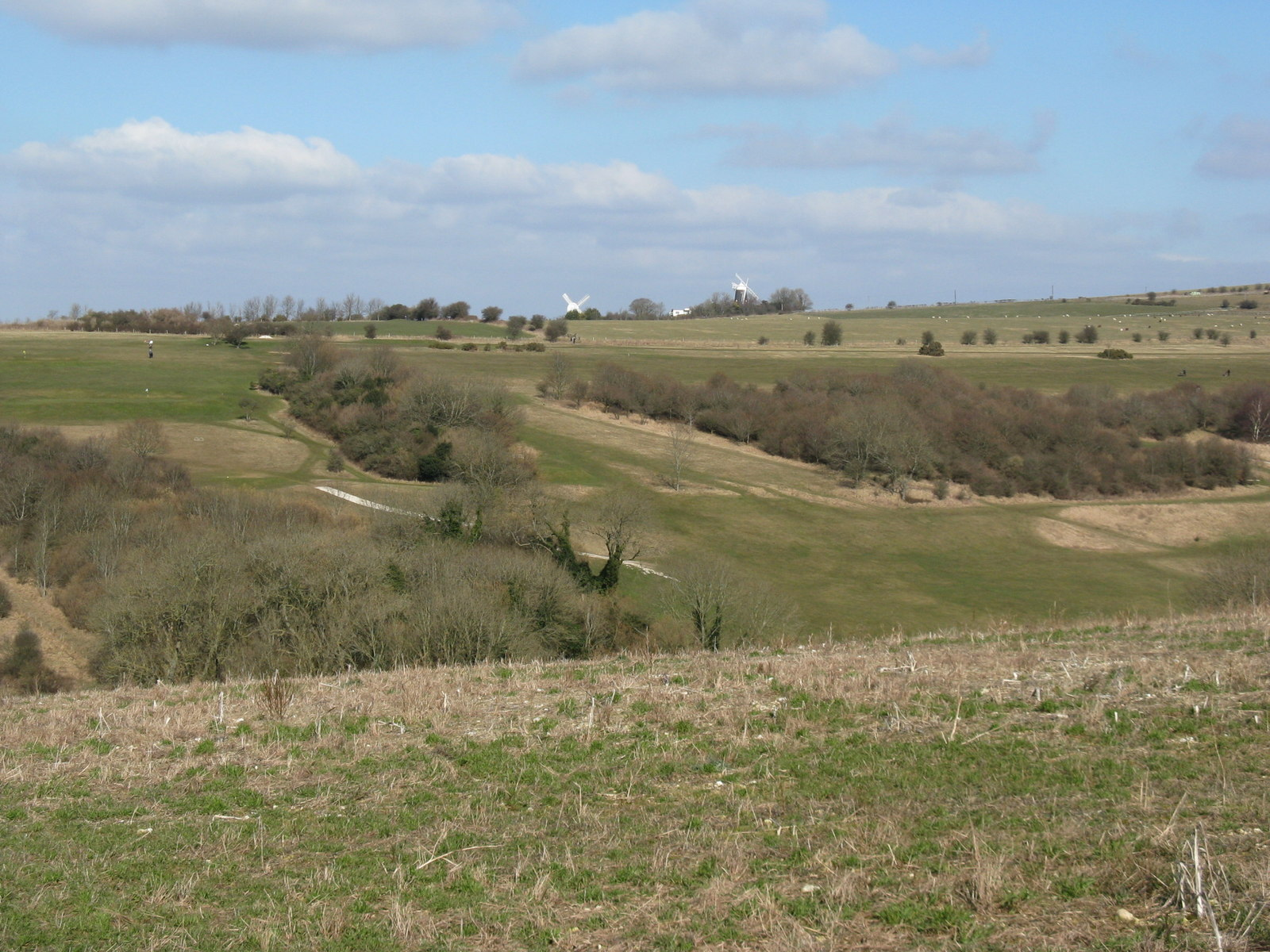
Pyecombe Golf course

Pyecombe Golf Course (TQ 303 123) was built on an exhilarating area of ancient Down pasture and chalk heath in 1894. The area includes Rag Bottom, which was remote enough to be a cockfighting venue before the golf course's construction and the windy Middle Brow. The South Downs Way passes through its northern side.

Although conflicts often arise between golf course management and nature conservation, the presence of the golf course prevented the Downs' ancient chalk grassland from being plowed over, unlike much of the surrounding area. After more than a century of minimal intervention, portions of the chalk grassland and small areas of rare chalk heath have survived, allowing both calcicolous (alkaline-loving) and heathland (acidic-loving) plants to coexist.

On Middle Brow one can find heath bedstraw, heath speedwell, slender St John's-wort, tormentil, dyers greenweed and even ling heather a and other calcifuge plants, alongside fragrant orchis, rockrose, harebell, betony, eyebright and yellow rattle. In the past though, there was the rare dwarf gorse, which is remarkably rare on the chalk. In autumn there may be as many as ten old meadow fungi including colourful waxcaps.

=== Pangdean ===
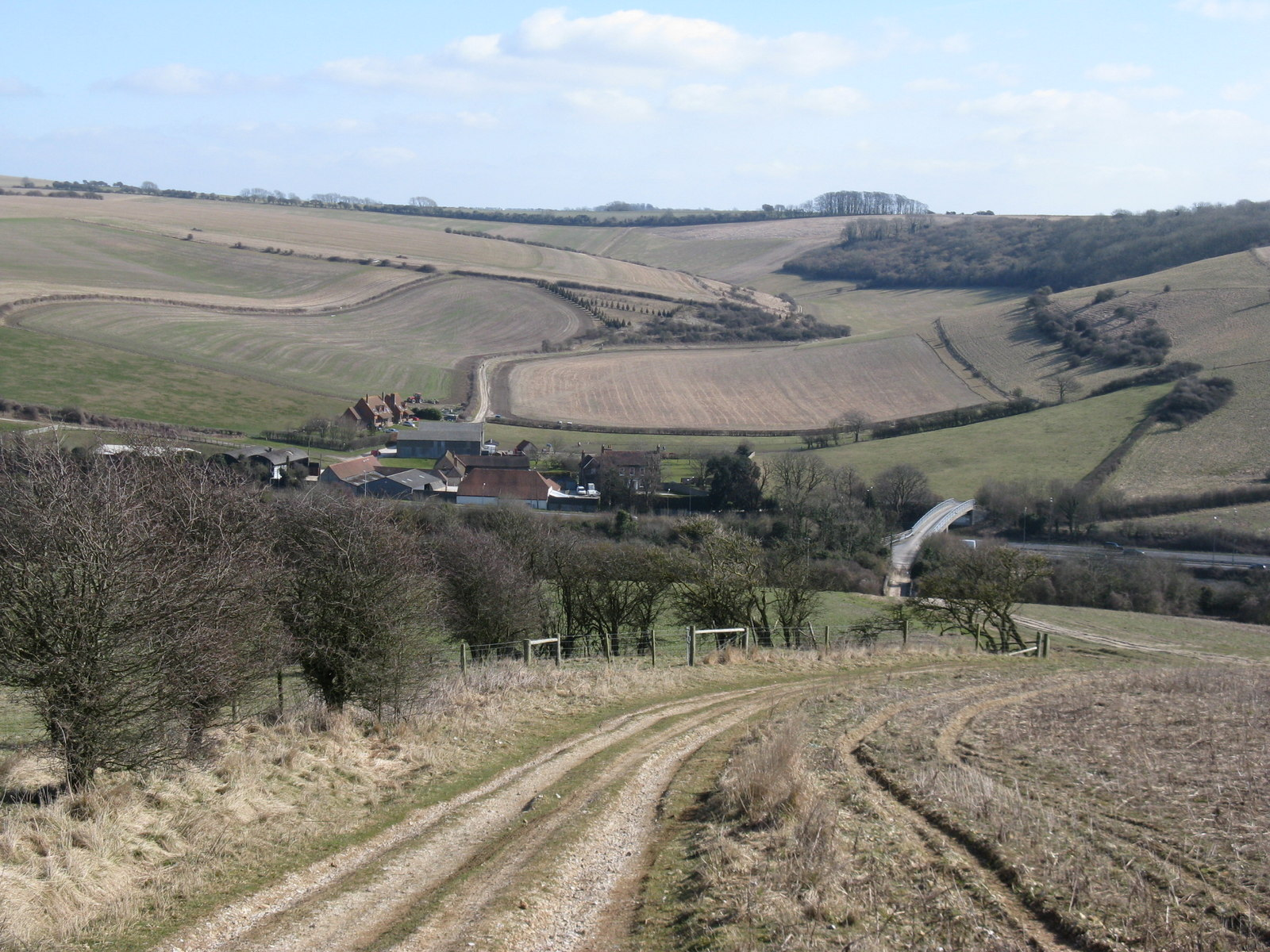
Bridleway descending east down West Hill

Pangdean farm (TQ 293 117) is likely to be older than Pycombe itself as it features in the Domesday Book, whilst Pyecombe does not. Glover suggests the name might come from the Old English term pinca denu meaning, "Valley frequented by finches". In the past there was no fast road through the valley as the roads went over the hilltops. Now the A23 lies right next to the farmhouse. The deep coombes to the west and east of Pangdean Farm have rich biodiversity and the din of the road quietens.

The steeper slopes of Holt Hill, just south east of the farmstead, have chalk grassland. The west slope (TQ 293 113) has lots of rockrose, pride of Sussex, orchids, tormentil and autumn gentian. The north slope (TQ 296 114) as lots of cowslips and yellow rattle and spring sedge.

==== Pangdean Holt ====
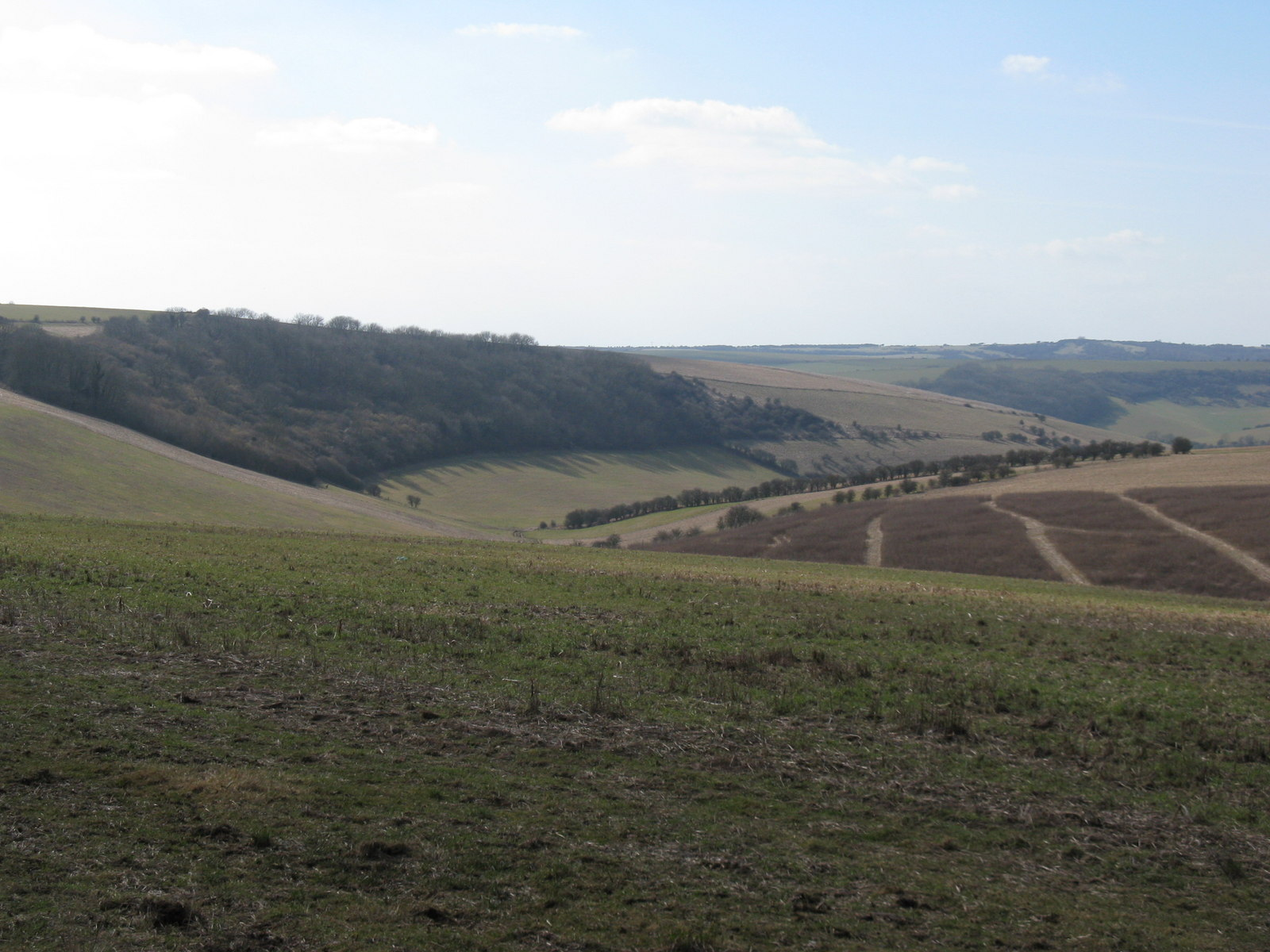
The woods on the hillside are Pangdean Holt and the dry valley is Holt Bottom

Pangdean Holt (TQ 300 112), north west of the Chattri, up and east from the farmstead and south of the golf club is an ancient woodland. It was a woodland seven hundred years ago, which means there's a fair chance it's been woodland for millennia. The Anglo-Saxons called woods dominated by a single species ‘holts’ and hazel is the main woody species at Pangdean Holt. There are ten plant species indicative of the Holt's antiquity which given the steep slope is a good total. There's redcurrant, pignut, early purple orchis, sanicle and early dog-violet. The richest area of the wood is at the slope top, where there can be wild strawberries, raspberry and gooseberry. There are several big and old ash trees that bear lichens and liverworts.

==== Pangdean Bottom ====
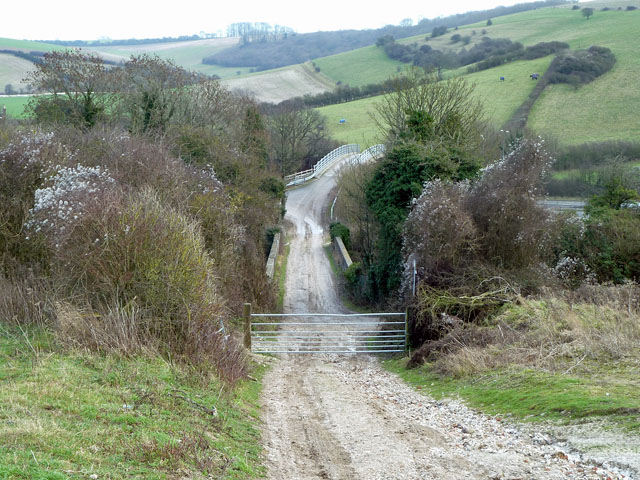
Rail and road bridges, Pangdean

Pangdean Bottom (TQ 282 111) is the west of the A23 and actually sits outside Pyecombe and in the Brighton jurisdiction, though long part of Pyecombe's landscape. It is rented by a tenant farmer from Brighton and Hove City Council, who have owned it since 1924. It includes ancient chalk grassland slopes where there are still chalkland flowers and butterflies. In late summer, the valley's north side has one of the largest populations of autumn ladies-tresses orchid has been recorded, on the valley's north side, together with a large population of the white variety of the self heal violet. The scrub at the head of the valley is old and diverse, with wayfaring tree, old man's beard, honeysuckle, hazel, and gorse.

In July 2021 the Sussex-based 'Landscapes of Freedom' group, together with Nick Hayes and Guy Shrubsole of the 'Right to Roam' network, organised a mass trespass in protest against the lack of public access to this valley and its management for game bird shooting, which has badly affected its chalk grassland wildlife. Over three hundred people walked from Waterhall, Brighton, to Pangdean Bottom in protest. The public are actively discouraged from walking in the area and scrub has been allowed to grow on the pristine downland, whilst other parts have been ploughed out.

== Listed buildings and scheduled monuments ==
Pyecombe civil parish contains seven listed buildings. Of these, one is Grade I and the remaining six are Grade II. The parish contains five scheduled monuments.

=== Listed buildings ===
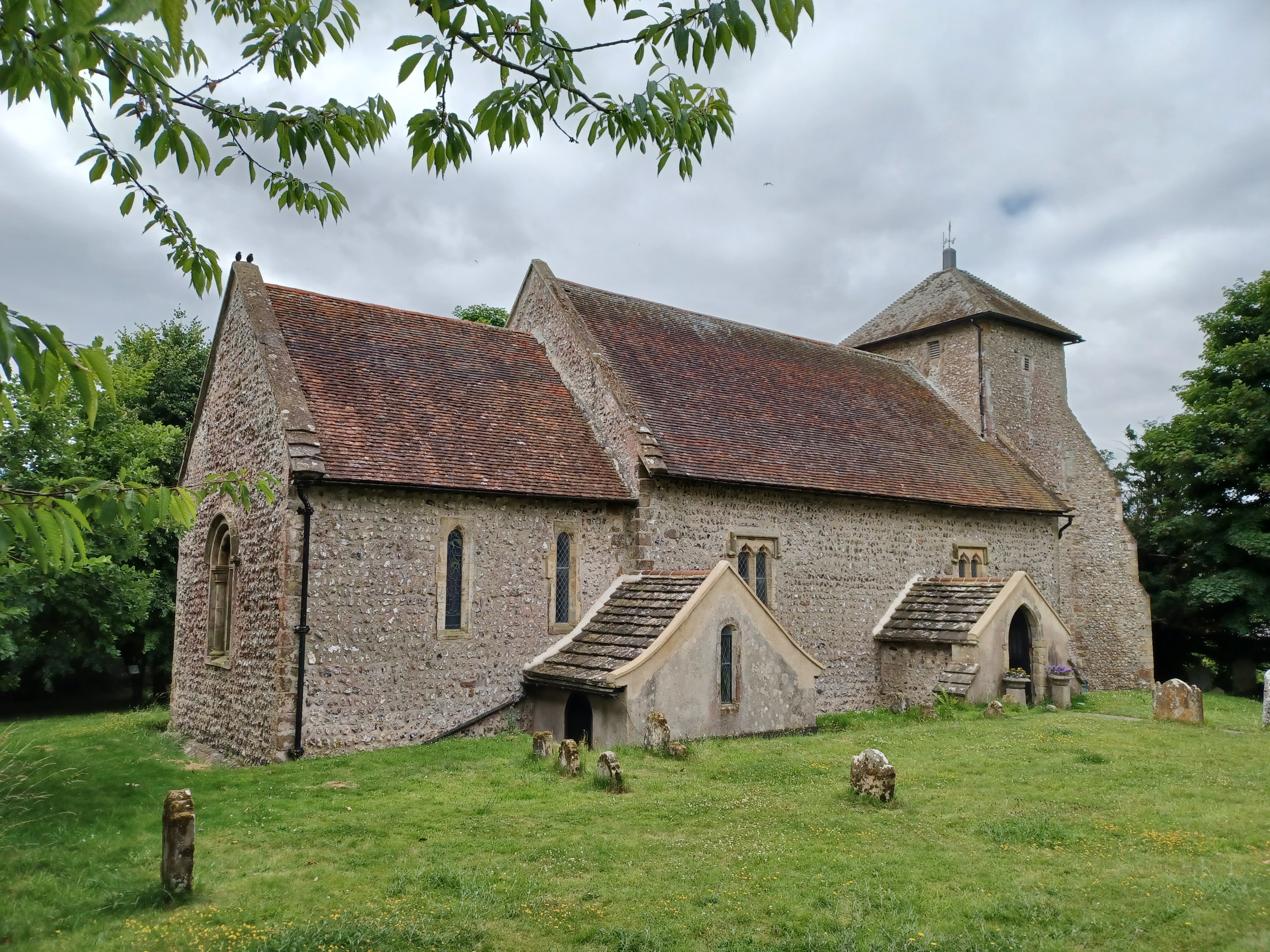
Church of the Transfiguration, Pyecombe

Grade I listed buildings:

- The Parish Church (Church of the Transfiguration) (List Entry Number 1025593). Chancel and nave 12th century, tower 13 century; 'an attractive small medieval building'.

=== Scheduled monuments ===
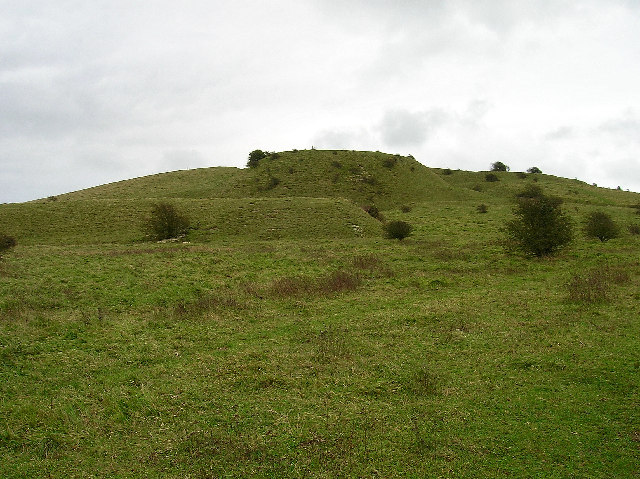
- Iron Age earthworks, Wolstonbury Hill
  Roman road and 18th century coaching road north of Pyecombe church (List Entry Number 1005821). The monument includes a Roman road and a late 18th century coaching road, the Brighton to Lovell Heath Turnpike, with 19th century realignments.
- Cross dyke and bowl barrow 310m south east of Wolstonbury Camp (List Entry Number 1015226), a univallate cross dyke and a bowl barrow situated on a chalk spur which projects to the south east from Wolstonbury Hill.
- Platform barrow 300m south of Wolstonbury Camp (List Entry Number 1015227), a roughly circular, flat-topped mound situated on a chalk spur which projects to the south east from Wolstonbury Hill.
- Romano-British farmstead, field system and trackway on Wolstonbury Hill (List Entry Number 1015228), a farmstead dating to the late Romano-British period and its associated field system and trackway, on the north eastern slope of Wolstonbury Hill.
- Wolstonbury Camp: a Ram's Hill type enclosure on Wolstonbury Hill and associated later remains (List Entry Number 1016153), a Late Bronze Age Ram's Hill type enclosure situated on Wolstonbury Hill, a clay-with-flints capped chalk hill.
