= Hurstpierpoint =

Village and parish in West Sussex, England

Coordinates: 50.9333°N 0.1853°W

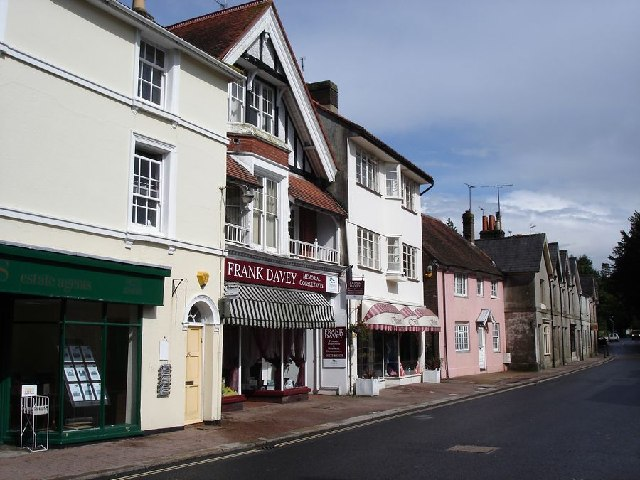
- Hurstpierpoint High Street

- Location within West Sussex
- OS grid reference: TQ279165
  - London: 39 miles (63 km) N
- Civil parish: Hurstpierpoint and Sayers Common
- District: Mid Sussex
- Shire county: West Sussex
- Region: South East
- Country: England
- Sovereign state: United Kingdom
- Post town: HASSOCKS
- Postcode district: BN6
- Dialling code: 01273
- Police: Sussex
- Fire: West Sussex
- Ambulance: South East Coast
- UK Parliament: Mid Sussex

Hurstpierpoint is a village in the Mid Sussex district, in the county of West Sussex, England, 4 miles (6.4 km) southwest of Burgess Hill, 1.5 miles (2.4 km) west of Hassocks railway station, and 40 miles south of London (as the crow flies). It sits in the civil parish of Hurstpierpoint and Sayers Common which has an area of 2029.88 ha and a population of 7,112.

The village was once chiefly one long street running east and west and most of the buildings in it are of the 18th century or later. The late 20th Century and early 21st Century saw Hurstpierpoint expanding greatly with new homes built north, east and west of the village.

Hurstpierpoint hosts the Hurst Festival which takes place every summer and has an active Scouts and Guides Groups.

Established in 1962, the Hurstpierpoint Society is a village organization with over 1,300 members, dedicated to enhancing and safeguarding the village surroundings and examining local planning proposals.

== Geography ==
The village is built on a sandstone ridge, 145 feet (44 m) above sea level, running east and west across the parish, on the road from Lewes to Albourne. This is crossed in the centre of the village by Cuckfield Road which goes north to Cuckfield. Hurstpierpoint is located close to the A23.

== History ==
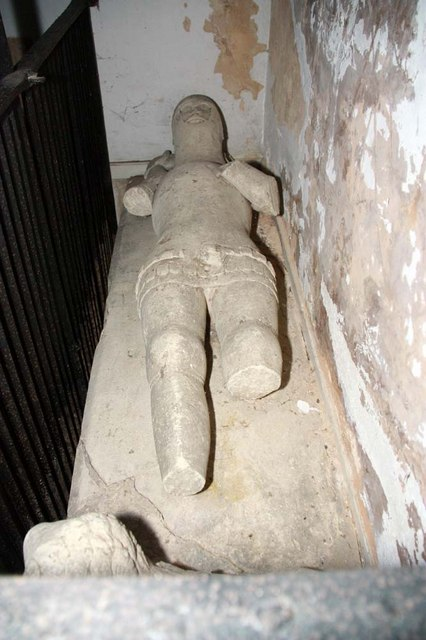
Tomb effigy in Holy Trinity Church

The Hurstpierpoint manor held all the land in a giant parish. Before the Norman Conquest it was owned by Earl Godwin. In the Domesday Book of 1086, the settlement was named as Herst in the ancient hundred of Buttinghill. After the Conquest, it was held by the de Pierpoints for many centuries.

There were twin Parks at Hurstpierpoint through the later Middle Ages, Little Park north of the Greensand ridge and Danny, or Great Park (TQ 285 152) to its south. Danny Park was made by enclosing existing woodland in the early 13th century. It remained a special place right up until the 1970s, particularly for its many ancient elms, which formed an avenue northwards from the house.

The name "Hurstpierpoint" derives from two sources. The first source is 'Hurst' (also spelled 'hyrst', 'herst' or 'hirst'), the Saxon name for a wooded hill. The hill woodland is likely to have been on the shadier, northern side of the greensand ridge, for the sunny south side is partially on the Lower Greensand which is an area that early farmers would have settled for the fertile ground, for example at Wanbarrow, Washbrooks, Tott Farm and Bedlam Street. The second source is de Pierpoint family who were early owners of the property. Throughout the centuries there have been several variants on the Hurstpierpoint name e.g. Herst (11th century); Herstperpunt (14th century); Perpondesherst (15th century).

In 1971 the civil parish had a population of 5355. On 1 April 2000 the parish was abolished to form "Hurstpierpoint and Sayers Common", part also went to Albourne and Burgess Hill.

== Notable buildings and areas ==
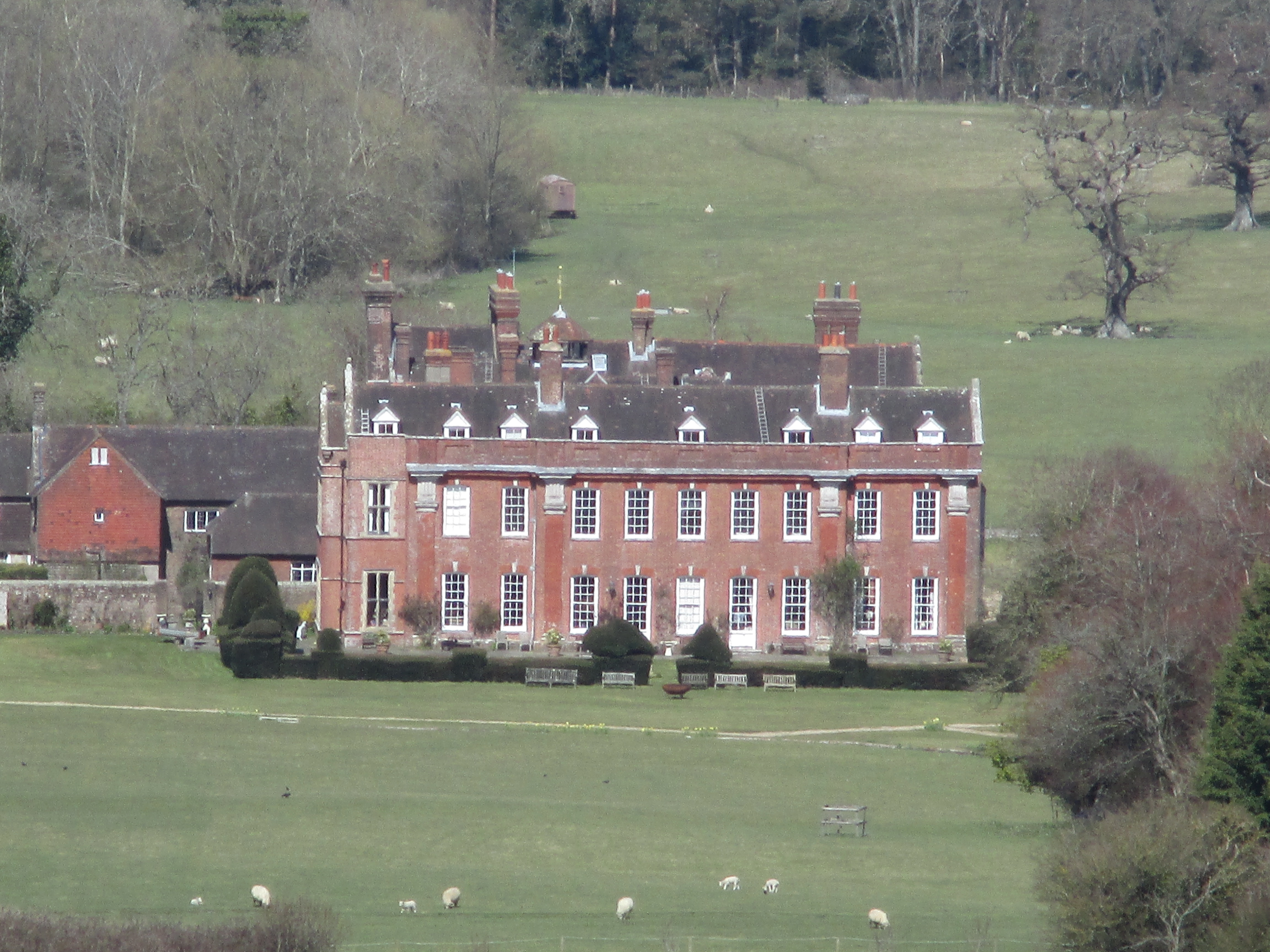
Danny House

The greensand ridge from Hurstpierpoint to Ditchling, is tracked by both the modern B2116 road, and the Roman Greensand Way whose camber is still visible at Randolphs Farm (TQ 278 158) and at Danny's Sandy Field (TQ 288 156).

To the south are the South Downs and Wolstonbury Hill. Between the village and the Hill is Danny Park and the Danny Woods. To the north of Hurstpierpoint is a waterland geography which is centred around the Herrings Stream.

There are five churches in the village which are St George's (not in use), Hurstpierpoint Methodist Church, Hurstpierpoint Good News Church and St Luke's Roman Catholic Church, which was closed in December 2019 and the Holy Trinity parish church.

=== Holy Trinity ===
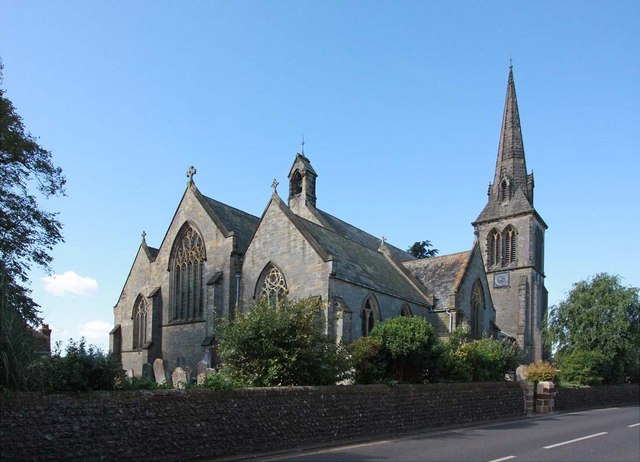
Holy Trinity Church

The parish church was a Norman church, but was largely rebuilt from the designs of Sir Charles Barry in 1843–5, who was famous for designing the Houses of Parliament. In 1854, the north chapel was added, in 1874 the south chapel and the north transept has been fitted up as a chapel in memory of those who died in the War of 1914–18. A number of funeral monuments and fittings were preserved from the old church. The font is probably from the 13th century, but the heavy round bowl has been reworked and painted. In the east window of the south chapel are set fifteen medallions of German or Flemish glass of the 16th and 17th centuries. In the south chapel is a much weathered recumbent effigy from 1260 of a cross-legged knight in chain armour, and at the west end of the north aisle is a much mutilated effigy of a knight from 1340. In the churchyard by the west wall are five tapering coffin lids from the 12th or 13th century, with hollow chamfered edges. One shows faint traces of a raised cross. The pavement outside the west doorway has about 150 inlaid slip tiles from the late 13th or early 14th century, which are suffering from wear.

=== Danny House ===
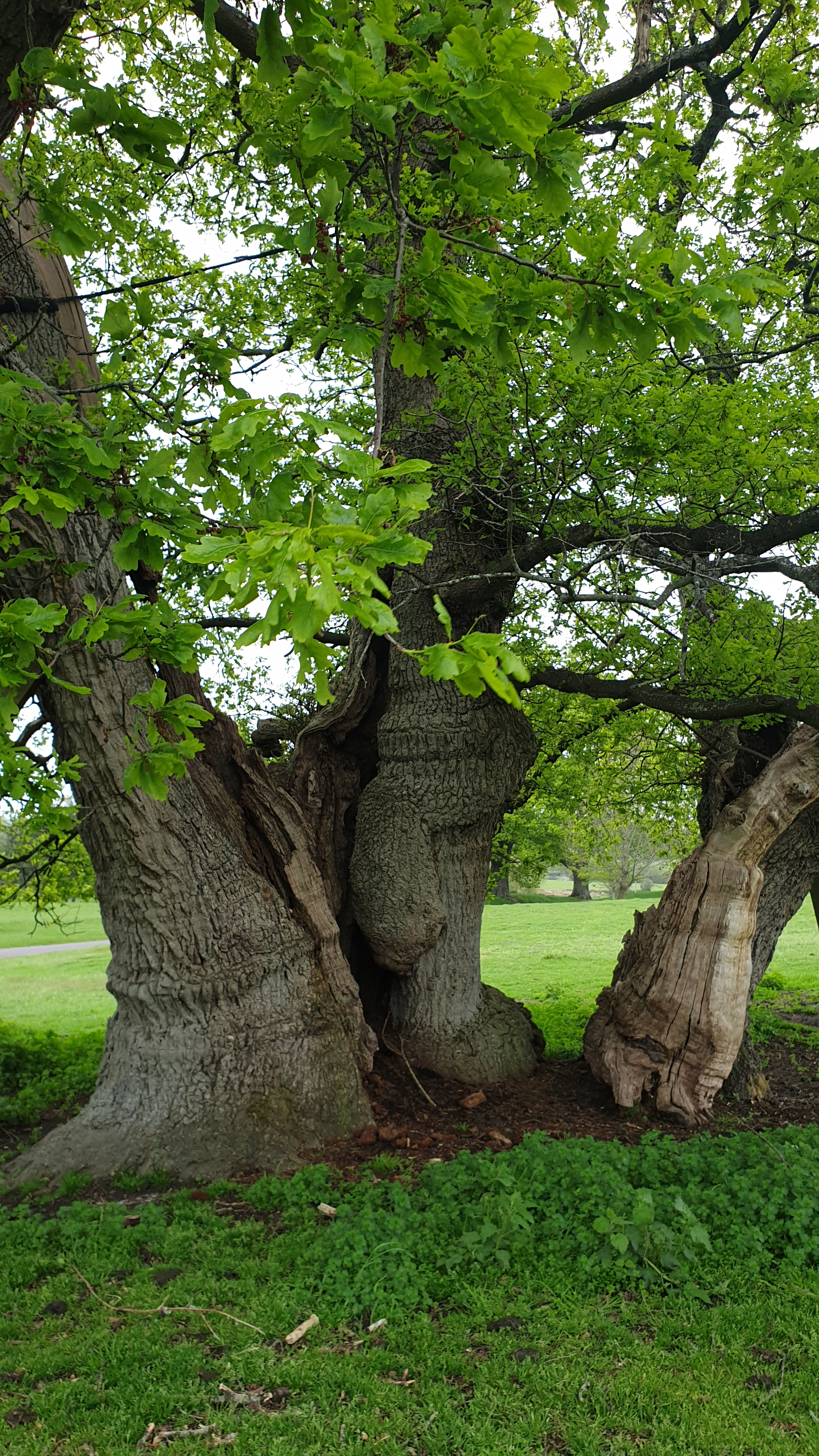
The Danny Old One, at around 800 years, is the oldest tree in Danny Park

Danny House (TQ 284 148) is an extravagant Elizabethan building. It is built of warm brick with a sunny Queen Anne south face and an E-faced eastern front with mullioned stone windows rising to the full height of the building and flooding the Great Hall behind in morning light.

Elms once lined the drive to the House, but are now gone as a result of Dutch elm disease.

Danny Lake and Pondtail Wood (TQ 288 153) that embraces it have been restored in recent times. The wood has bluebells, anemones and primroses.

=== Herrings Stream ===
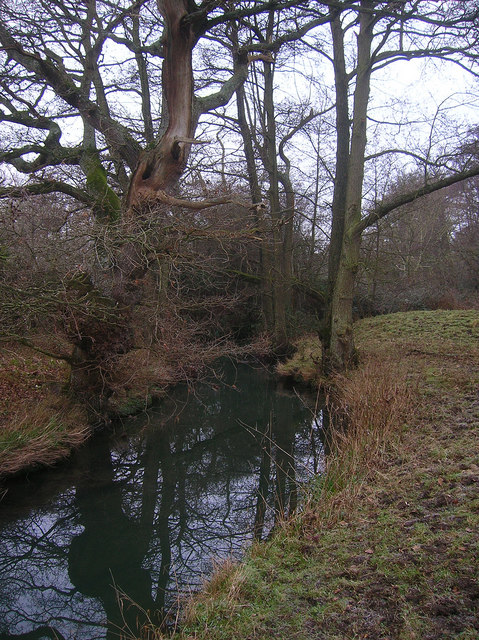
Herrings Stream

The Herrings Stream is a tributary of the eastern River Adur and runs to the north of Hurstpierpoint. Walking from Cobb's Mill (TQ 274 189) east to Eylesford Bridge (on the A273) reveals wetlands that passes many bridges and lost fordings including Cobbsmill Bridge, Gold Bridge (as in marsh marigold, kingcups), Stalker Bridge, Danworthbrook Bridge, Ruckford and Eylesford Bridge. A kilometre from Cobb's Mill to Stalker Bridge (where the Cuckfield Road crosses) you can walk alongside the running mill leat, with its sticklebacks, emperor dragonflies, grey wagtails, banded demoiselles and house martins. Upstream of Ruckford and Hammond's Mills the leats no longer function, but can still be made out.

East of Ruckford Mill there is a wooded lily pond (TQ 296 179) with clear water and much hornwort and curled pondweed. Between Ruckford Mill and Locks Manor are two well managed archaic flower meadows, e.g. (TQ 293 180). Between Danworth and Kent's Farms the river meanders, and in some places little brook meadows survive. At other points they have been incorporated into larger fields.

=== Local woods ===
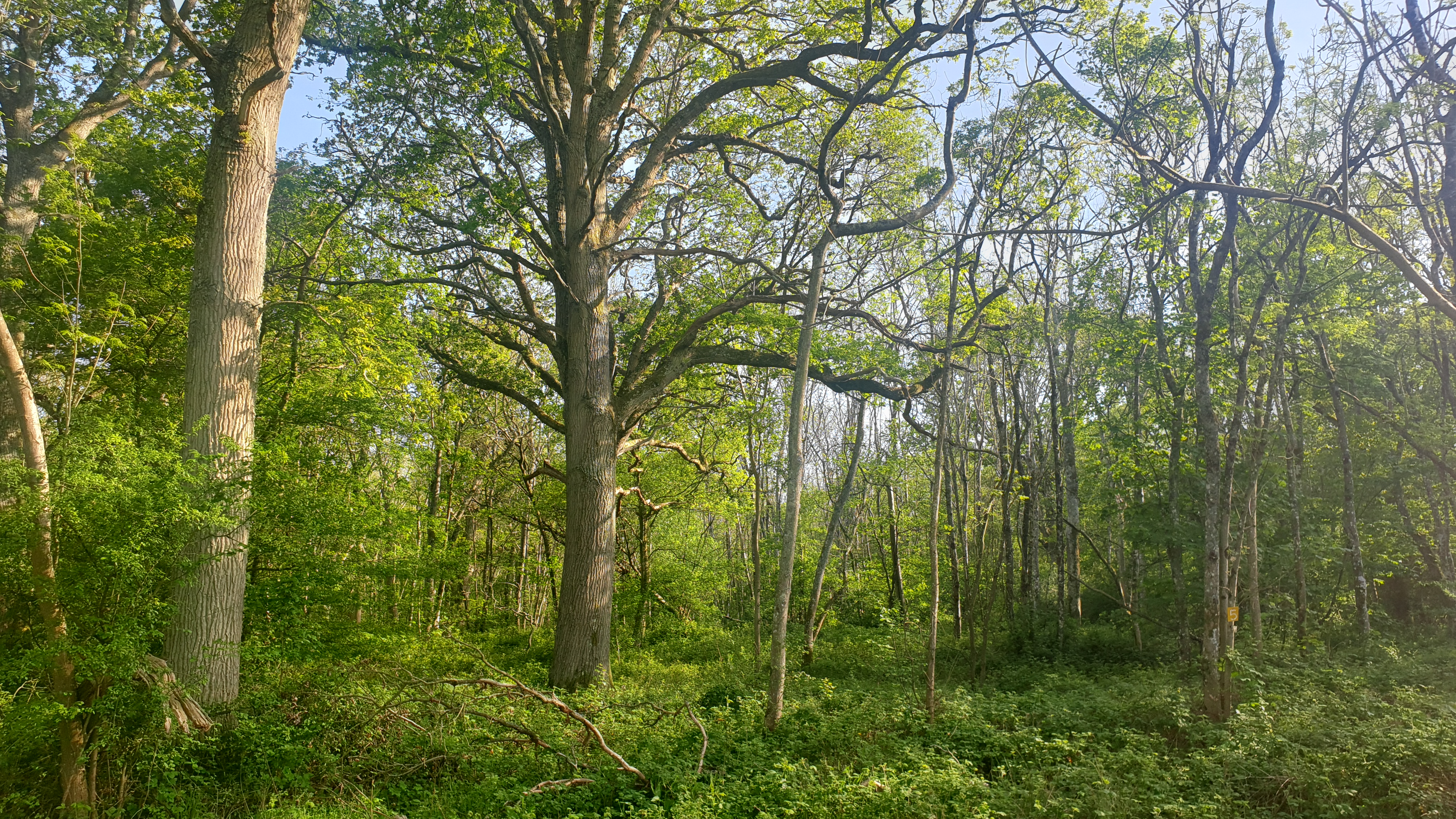
Randolph's Copse

On the northeastern edge of Hurstpierpoint there are still two ancient woods. Tilley's Copse (TQ 283 173) is a bluebell wood, with crab apple, wych elm, gean, midland thorn and hornbeam. The Wilderness, just to the south (TQ 279 169), is a damper place.

On the Gault Clay, south of Hurstpierpoint and Hassocks, are a cluster of ancient woods centred on the Elizabethan mansion of Danny, which have mostly escaped coniferisation and heavy recreational damage.

Twenty ancient woodland flowers have been counted in Randolph's Copse (TQ 274 145), including lesser butterfly and early purple orchids, ransoms and guelder rose. There is also ragged robin and betony. White admiral and silver-washed fritillary butterflies have been recorded here. There can be orange waxcaps on the narrowing rides of Foxhole Shaw.

Old Wood (TQ282 147), next to Danny, has been damaged by the whims of past big house owners, with heavy planting of non-local species, including lots of horse chestnut and both large leaved and common lime. The Gill (TQ 289 150) is a coppiced ash wood east of New Way Lane.

== Education ==
St Lawrence Church of England Primary School is located close to the centre of the village and is for children 4 to 11 years of age. Also located in the village is the public school, Hurstpierpoint College, to be found to the north-east of the village, and the pre-school, next to the Primary School, for children 2 to 5 years of age.

== St Lawrence Fair ==
Every July the St Lawrence Fair takes place in Hurstpierpoint. The fair was granted a royal charter in 1313 and is still an important event in the life of the village. The fair takes place on the first Saturday in July and begins with a procession of floats through the high street. These are made by groups such as playschools, primary schools, scouts and Brownies and have a different theme each year. Other popular events of the day are the family fun run and the tug-o-war where the local pubs battle it out for a barrel of beer. In 2007 and 2008 it was won by the White Horse of Albourne Road. The fair is home to Harris’s Old Tyme Amusements and usually has their Gallopers, a chair-o-plane amongst its rides with juvenile Austin cars, platform and Dobbie roundabout as well as different stalls such as a coconut shy, Tin Can Alley. Ball in the churn. Charities and businesses from around the area place stalls, tombolas and raffles around the centre, and on the other side is the beer tent and pig roast.

== Sport ==
Hurstpierpoint is the home of Hurstpierpoint F.C., who play in the Mid Sussex Football League. The club was formed in 1886, originally playing in the grounds of Danny House. The side is known for signing Premier League record appearance holder and former Aston Villa, Manchester City, Everton and West Bromwich Albion defensive midfielder Gareth Barry in July 2024.

Hurstpierpoint Colts FC is an FA Affiliated youth football club. The club plays in the Horsham & District Youth Football League and Crawley & District Youth Football League. Youth matches are played at various venues: Fairfield Recreation Ground, Court Bushes Football Fields and Berrylands Playing Fields.

== Notable people ==
James Hannington (1847–1885), Anglican missionary and martyr, was born here and served as curate-in-charge at St George's, Hurstpierpoint. He was the first Anglican bishop of East Africa.

A notable local resident was Jimmy Hill, former Match of the Day presenter and football player, manager and chairman, who was generous of his time for local events, clubs and societies until his death on 19 December 2015 aged 87. Greta Scacchi also lived in the village until 2011 when a dispute with a neighbour led her to leave. The agricultural chemist Sir John Saint (1898–1987) lived at Selwyn in St George's Lane. The Olympic runner Frank Salvat also lived there until his death in 2013, and Brighton & Hove Albion winger Kazenga LuaLua lived in the village. Likewise, Brighton & Hove Albion centre back and captain Lewis Dunk has lived in Hurstpierpoint since 2016. The village was home to the geologist and authority on mollusca Robert Ashington Bullen (1850–1912) for a period. William Walcot RE (1874–1943), architect, graphic artist and etcher, notable as a practitioner of refined Art Nouveau in Moscow, committed suicide at Hurstpierpoint.

Haydn Gwynne was born on 21 March 1957 in Hurstpierpoint, Sussex, to Rosamond (née Dobson) and Guy Thomas Haydn Gwynne (1915–1994).

Journalist Emily Morgan lived in the village.

== See also ==
- Mansion House, Hurstpierpoint
