= The Lost Rainforests of Britain =

2022 non-fiction book by Guy Shrubsole

- Author: Guy Shrubsole
- Language: English
- Subject: Rainforests, Ecology
- Genre: non-fiction
- Publisher: William Collins
- Publication date: 27 October 2022
- ISBN: 978-0008527952

The Lost Rainforests of Britain is a non-fiction book by British author and environmental campaigner Guy Shrubsole. The book explores the existence and ecological importance of temperate rainforests in Britain, sometimes referred to as Celtic rainforests, which are often overlooked or forgotten. Shrubsole aims to raise awareness about these unique habitats and advocate for their preservation and restoration. It won the 2023 Wainwright Prize for Nature Writing.

== Synopsis ==
The Lost Rainforests of Britain introduces readers to the concept of temperate rainforests, highlighting their ecological importance and the rich biodiversity they support. These rainforests, characterized by high levels of rainfall and a lush, diverse ecosystem, are often overshadowed by their tropical counterparts.

The book traces the historical development of these rainforests in Britain, detailing how they have been shaped by natural processes and human activities over centuries. Shrubsole combines personal exploration with scientific research to document the current state of these habitats. He identifies various locations across Britain where temperate rainforests still exist, including parts of western Scotland, such as the Atlantic oakwoods of the Scottish Highlands, the coastal rainforests of Wales, and pockets in England, like the rainforest fragments found in Devon and Cornwall.

Shrubsole provides detailed descriptions of the unique flora and fauna found in these areas. These include ancient oak trees, rare lichens, mosses, and ferns, as well as unique animal species like the pine marten and the lesser horseshoe bat. He discusses the contemporary challenges these ecosystems face, such as deforestation, agricultural expansion, and climate change, which threaten their survival.

Additionally, the book delves into the cultural and historical significance of rainforests in British mythology, folklore, and religion. Shrubsole explores how these ancient woodlands have influenced British culture, appearing in legends and stories such as the tales of King Arthur, which often depict enchanted forests as places of mystery and magic, as well as J. R. R. Tolkien and William Wordsworth. He examines the role of rainforests in Druidic practices and other ancient religious rites, illustrating their spiritual importance.

== Critical reception ==
The book was released to positive reviews. The Times described it as "a book of two tales: a celebration of these dazzling worlds and a plea to act before they are extinguished." The Financial Times called the book "remarkable", and wrote that "Shrubsole has completely changed the way many people look at the temperate woodlands that remain in parts of western Britain, fragments of which survive as havens of flora and fauna, as well as eerily evocative reminders of how much of the country used to look."
