= Danny House =

Grade I listed Elizabethan red brick mansion in West Sussex, England

Coordinates: 50°55′09″N 0°10′24″W

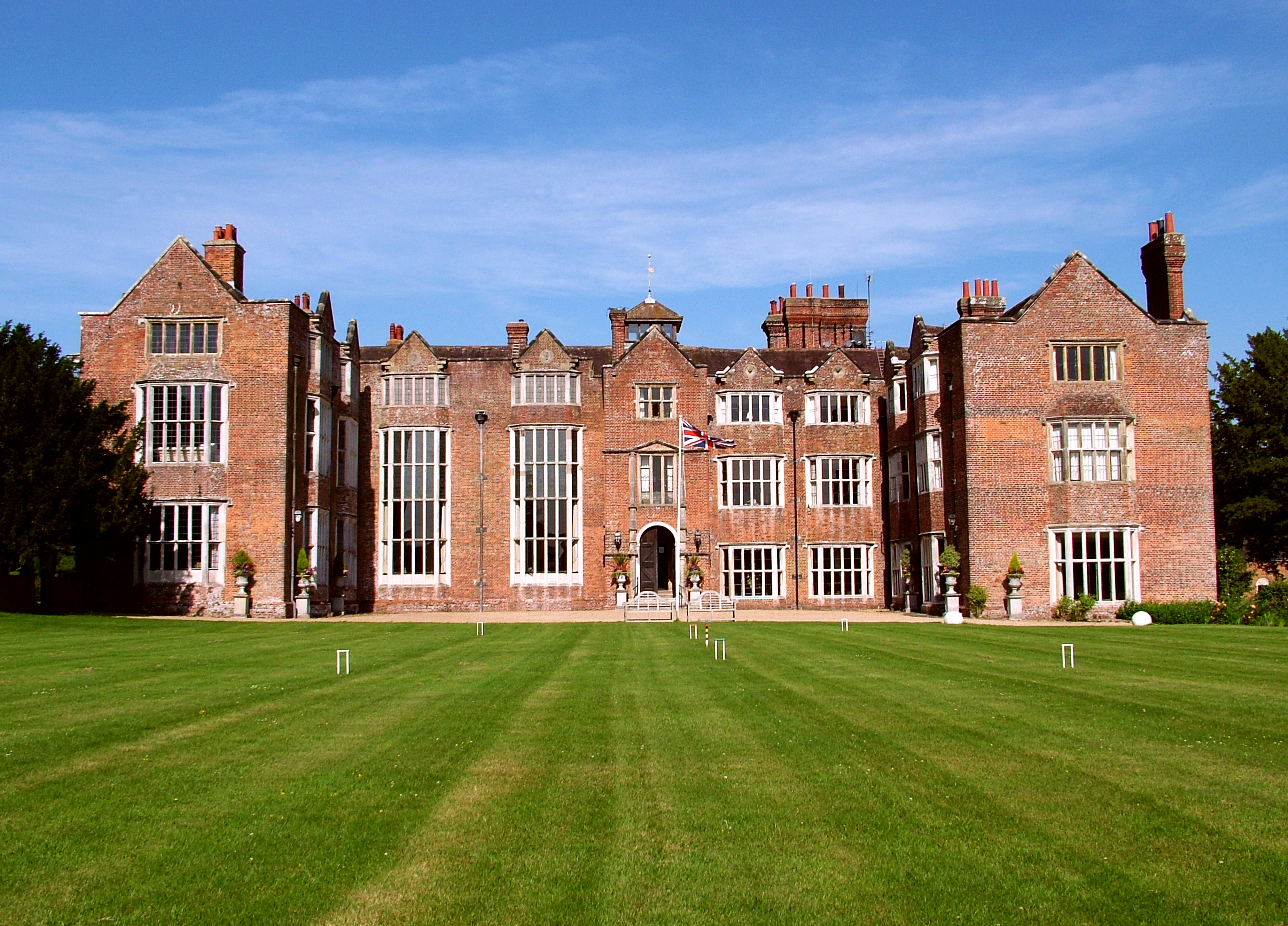
Danny House

Danny House is a Grade I listed Elizabethan red brick mansion near Hurstpierpoint in West Sussex, England. It lies at the northern foot of Wolstonbury Hill and may be regarded as one of the finest stately houses in Sussex, with 56 bedrooms and 28 apartments. The present house was built 1593–95 by George Goring, on the site of an older house. It is set in eight acres (32,000 m^{2}) of gardens at the foot of the South Downs within an historic parkland of some 400 acres, which was granted by royal charter in 1333.

== History ==
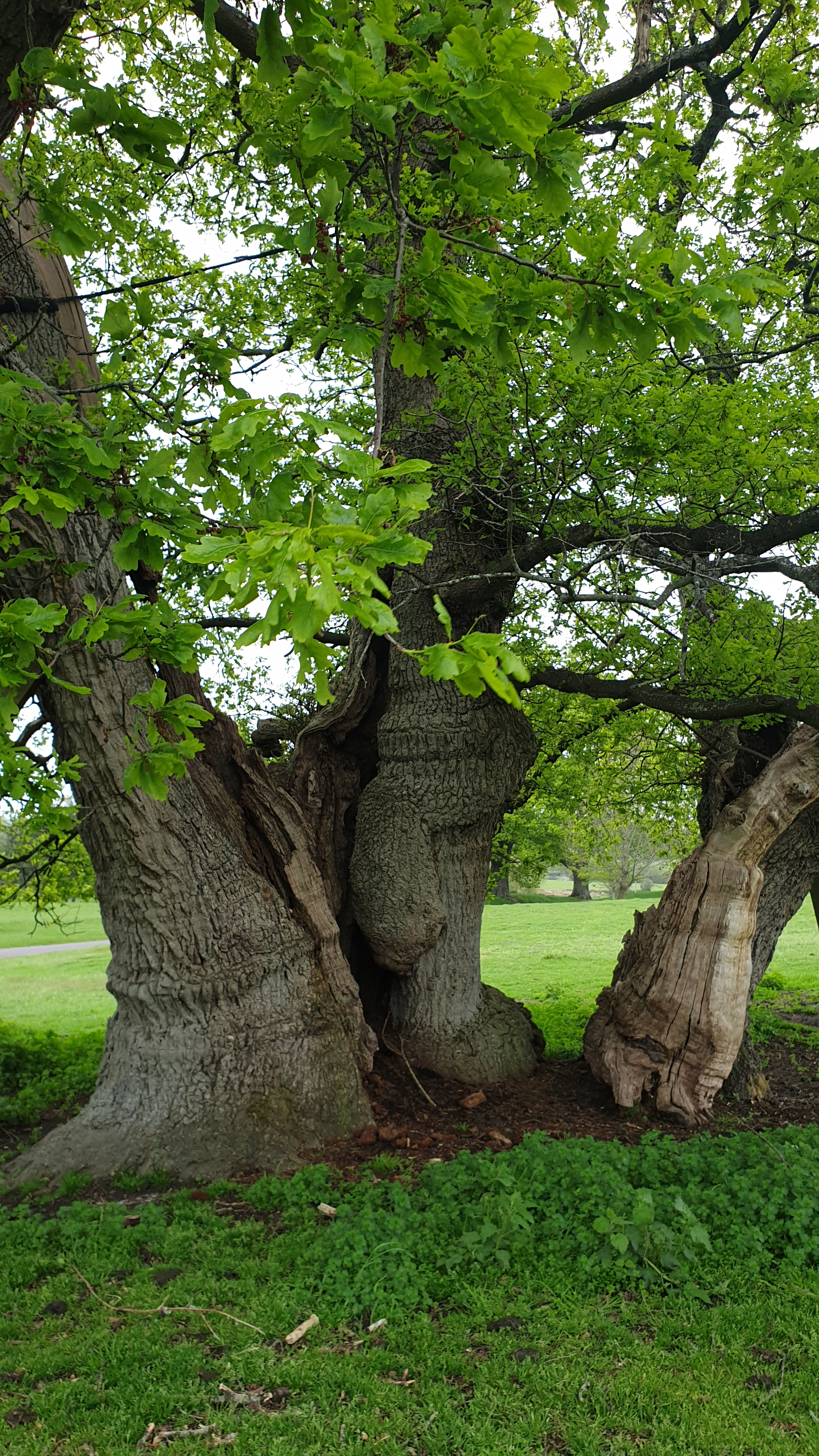
Danny Old One: perhaps the oldest oak in the Sussex Weald with 32.5 ft (9.9 m) girth

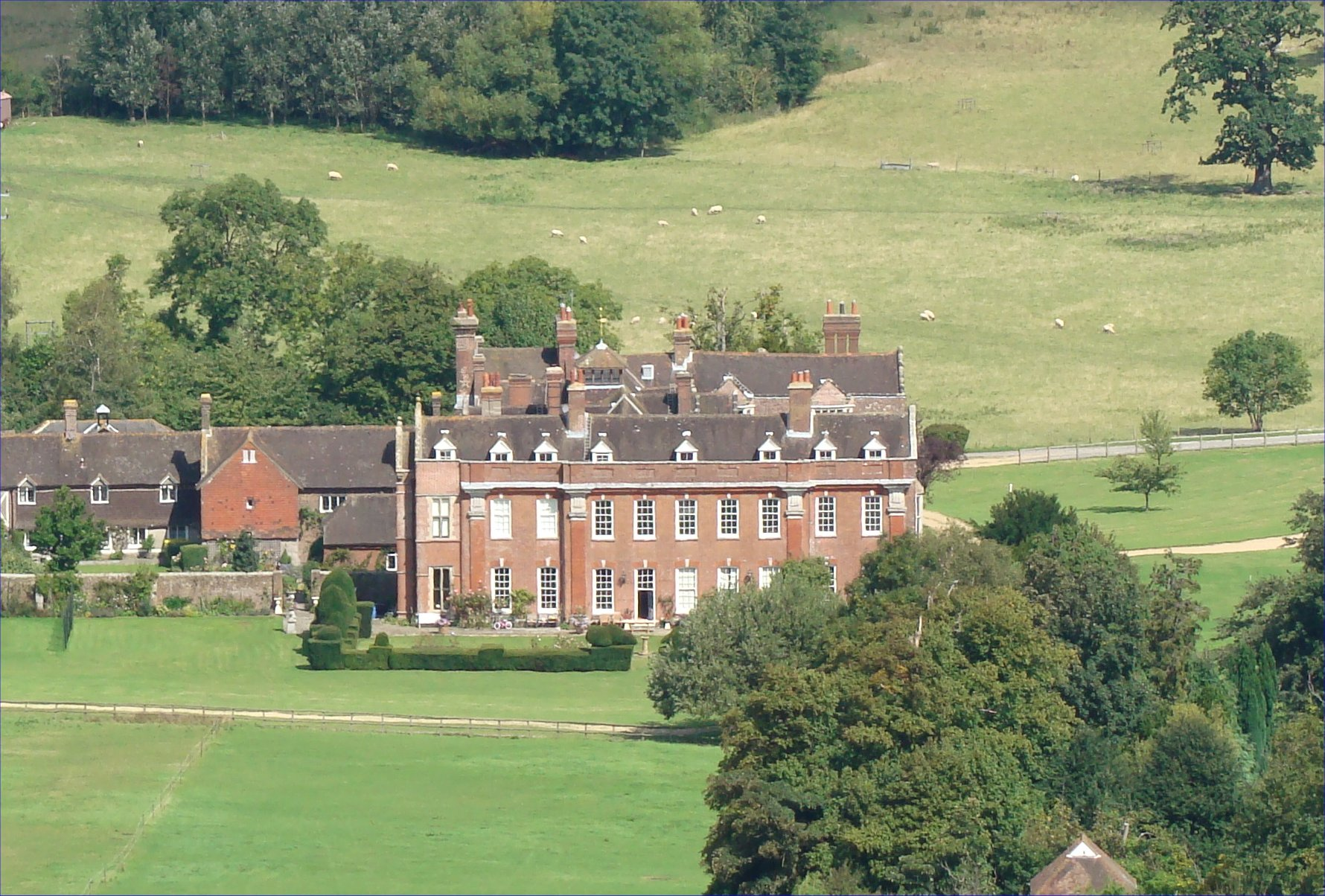
Danny House

=== Pre-Roman ===
The outline of a Bronze Age enclosure exists above Danny House on the top of nearby Wolstonbury Hill (now owned by the National Trust and within the South Downs National Park). On the west side of Wolstonbury there is a large artificial plateau thought to be the site of an Iron Age camp.

=== Roman times ===
The Sussex Greensand Way Roman road passed through the site of Danny Park in an east–west direction, making an alignment change on the hill to the north of the house. The road survives as a terrace on the shoulder of the hill, a hollow way leading down the hill and a raised strip leading to the stream. A Roman pottery kiln has been found south of the road.

=== Domesday Book ===
The Domesday Book of 1086 recorded that “Robert holds Herst of William”. The Robert to whom the inquest referred was Robert de Pierpoint with the entry indicating that the de Pierpoint held the land of Herst, today known as Hurstpierpoint, from William de Warenne. de Warenne was a son-in-law of William the Conqueror.

=== 13th and 14th centuries ===
As they had done in the 11th century, the de Pierpoint continued to hold Danny. A house has existed on the site since the 13th century, but it likely that it was little more than a hunting-lodge at this time.

It is from the 14th century that the oldest-known documentary evidence for the manor's name dates. In the first half of that century a licence was granted to Sir Simon de Pierpoint by William de Warenne to enclose “the wood at Daneghithe” Showing flexibility in the spelling of the manor's name, in 1343 another licence was granted to Sir Simon de Pierpoint, this time by John de Warenne, 4th Earl of Surrey, to enclose “the wood at Danye and the demesne lands bounding the wood”.

==== Danny Old One ====
It is in this period that the oak known as Danny Old One will have first seeded itself. It is perhaps oldest oak tree in the Sussex Weald. Her girth is 32.5 feet (9.9 metres). The oak is now so old that if you were to visit her as David Bangs puts it, "You will be visiting a being that grew up with the Saxon talk of the woodsmen and parkers who walked beneath her, and the old Norman-French of the medieval Pierpont lords, who rode by."

=== Late 16th century ===
The house in its present form dates from the early sixteenth century but was reconstructed and enlarged by George Goring in 1593, after he had purchased the estate in 1582. It was designed in the shape of the letter E to represent the Queen (Elizabeth I of England) who had been on the throne for over 30 years at the commencement of the reconstruction work. The house represents a fine example of Elizabethan architecture.

The current house has two main fronts, the east 16th century, the south early Georgian. The brick-built east frontage is monumental, the south front stately, the whole building a prominent element in views from the downs. It stands to three storeys.

=== Mid 17th century ===
After four generations of Gorings, Danny was sold to Peter Courthope in 1650. In 1652 Danny Great Park was 54 hectares (130 acres) with arable land and meadow amounting to about 170 hectares (420 acres).

In 1702, Barbara Courthope married Henry Campion, and in 1725 they made Danny their home, and soon undertook extensive alterations, including the re-fronting of the south side of the house as is confirmed by the date 1728 and their initials on the leaden water-pipes. Several generations of Campions followed.

=== The world’s earliest cricket ground ===
Cricket is recorded in the Thomas Marchant's diaries as having been played at Sand Field, Danny Park in 1717. This makes Sand Field the earliest identifiable cricket ground in the world. In July 2017, the tri-centenary of the occasion was celebrated by a match played between Danny House and Hurstpierpoint Cricket Club.

=== War Cabinet ===
During World War I, Lord Riddle rented out Danny House for four months to Prime Minister David Lloyd George, where he lived here in a ménage à trois with his wife Margaret and his secretary and mistress Frances Stevenson. Regular meetings of the Imperial War Cabinet were held in the Great Hall, where on 13 October 1918 terms of the armistice to be offered to Germany at the end of the Great War were decided, and authority was given to US President Woodrow Wilson to negotiate the armistice.

There were some letters, written at Danny, from Lloyd George to Frances Stevenson, one of which read:

"My darling Pussy. You might phone from the Treasury on Friday if you can come. Don't let Hankey see you. If Saturday impossible, what about Monday? Fondest love to my own."

D. (Hankey was then Cabinet Secretary).

=== Recent history ===
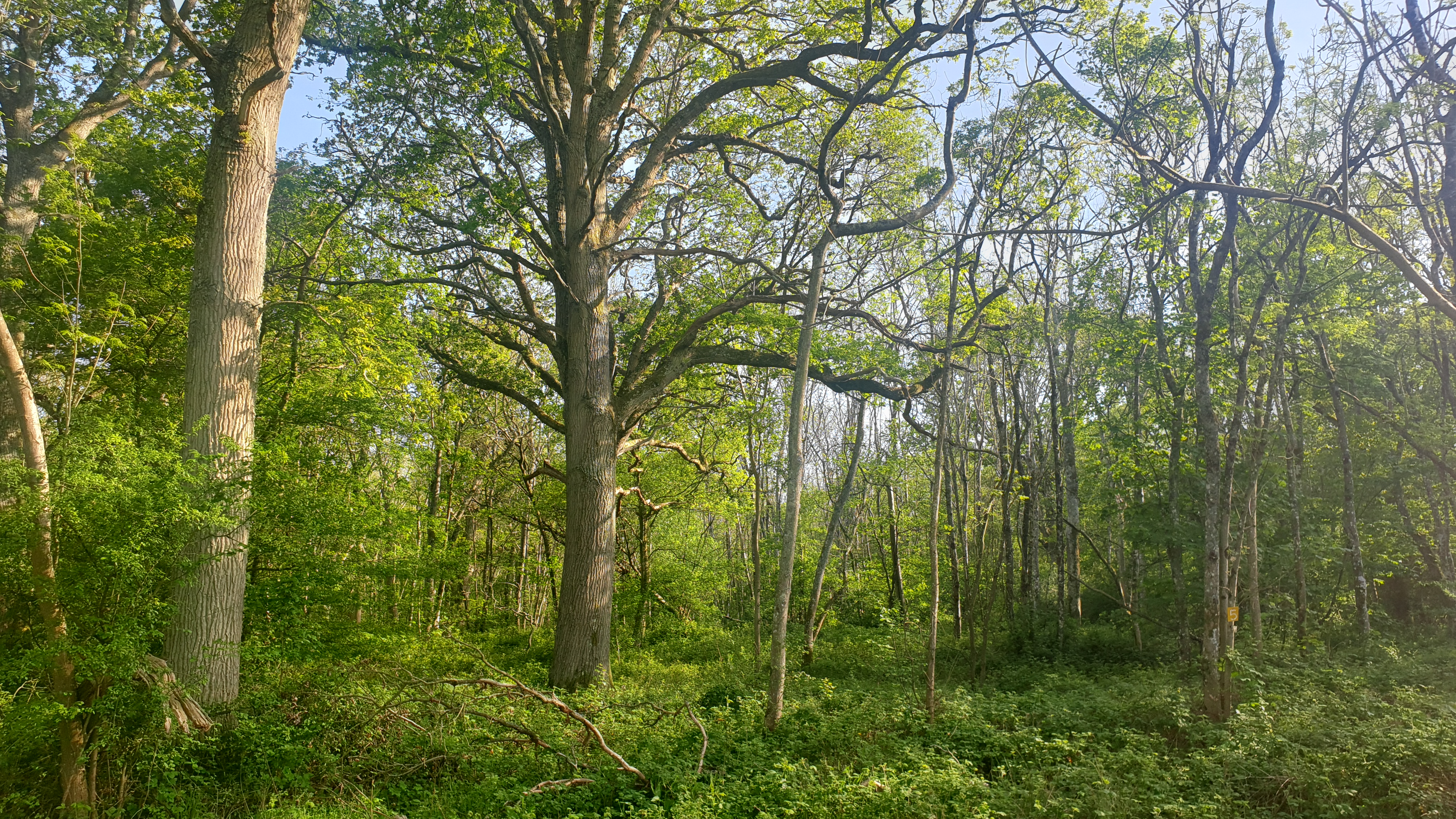
Randolph's Copse, an ancient woodland and one of the Danny Woods

Soon after the war Danny House became a school, firstly known as Montpelier College and then Wolstonbury College, which had been transferred from Brighton, but this closed down in 1956. Although the Campion family were no longer residing in the house, the estate continued in the ownership of the Campions until the 1980s when the estate was broken up and the various land holdings, houses and farms were sold to tenants or into private hands. The house was then bought by Mutual Households Association (later the Country Houses Association). After the CHA went into liquidation in 2003, the house was bought by a private purchaser in 2004. In 2007, Danny House celebrated 50 years as a retirement home.

==== Danny Park and the Danny Woods ====
The parkland still contains large, noble oaks of varying ages and growth patterns and is used today for a variety of recreational activities. Until the 1970s ancient elms formed an avenue north of house, but they succumbed to Dutch elm disease. The best ancient trees are in Sandy Field (TQ 288 155), which was part of the original park, including Danny Old One. There were a colony of beewolves in the field mining the sandy soil, although the numbers appear to have decreased.

There are a number of ancient woods, including Stalkers (TQ 272 149), Randolph's Copse (TQ 274 149) and Foxhole Shaw (TQ 279 145), with tens of ancient woodland flower species including butterfly orchid, early purple orchid, wild garlic and guelder rose. Woodland butterfly such as white admiral and silver-washed fritillary can also be found there. Old Wood, next to Danny House, has been damaged by the heavy planting of non-local species, including horse chestnut, large leaved lime and common lime.

== Bibliography ==
- Sussex County Magazine Vol. 1, page 457
- Country Life, 22 March 1913
