= Guy Shrubsole =

English researcher and writer

Guy Shrubsole is a British researcher, writer and campaigner. He wrote Who Owns England? (2019), The Lost Rainforests of Britain (2022), and, most recently, The Lie of the Land (2024).

== Life ==
Shrubsole was born in Newbury, Berkshire, and attended St Bartholomew's School.

== Work ==
For this first book, Shrubsole used various datasets and tools to research who owns the land in England, calling it "one of the clearest cases of a cover-up in English history."

In August 2020, Shrubsole and Nick Hayes launched a campaign on freedom to roam in England, called Right to Roam. In July 2021, Shrubsole and Hayes collaborated with Landscapes of Freedom and David Bangs to organise a mass trespass on the Sussex Downs to raise awareness of the failings of the Countryside and Rights of Way Act 2000, which Shrubsole criticises for its limitations.

He used to work as Policy and Campaigns Coordinator at Rewilding Britain.

Shrubsole's Lost Rainforests of Britain campaign attempts to find, map, photograph, and restore the Atlantic Oakwood forests, woodlands variously referred to in Britain as Upland Oakwoods, Atlantic Oakwoods, Western Oakwoods, Temperate Rainforest, and Caledonian Forest, and colloquially as "Celtic Rainforests". His book on the subject was shortlisted for the Richard Jefferies Society Literary Prize and longlisted for the James Cropper Wainwright Prize for Writing on Conservation.

In his book The Lie of the Land: Who Really Cares for the Countryside? (2024), Shrubsole challenges deeply ingrained narratives about land ownership and environmental stewardship in England.

== Publications ==
- —— (2019). Who Owns England?: How We Lost Our Green and Pleasant Land, and How to Take It Back. William Collins. ISBN 9780008321673.
- —— (2022). The Lost Rainforests of Britain. William Collins. ISBN 9780008527990.
- —— (2024). The Lie of the Land: Who Really Cares for the Countryside?. London: HarperCollins. ISBN 9780008651770.

== See also ==
- Land ownership in the United Kingdom
- Return of Owners of Land, 1873
