= Emily Morgan (journalist) =

British television news journalist (1977–2023)

Personal details
- Born: 22 July 1977 Banbury, Oxfordshire
- Died: 26 May 2023 (aged 45) Brighton, East Sussex
- Occupation: Journalist

Emily Morgan (22 July 1977 – 26 May 2023) was a British journalist. She worked for ITV News for two decades and at her death was the network's health and science editor.

== Early life and education ==
Born at Banbury in Oxfordshire, Emily Morgan was the second of three daughters of an agricultural consultant and grew up in the village of Little Compton. Her younger sister is Polly Morgan, taxidermist / artist. She was educated at Sibford School, studied theatre with culture and communication at Lancaster University, and earned a postgraduate degree in journalism at the University of Central Lancashire.

== Career ==
Morgan began her career in 2001 creating and reading news bulletins at Independent Radio News. She subsequently became a producer under ITV's political editor Tom Bradby and then an on-camera news reporter, covering Wales and the West of England and then becoming a political correspondent. In 2012, she reported on the disappearance of April Jones for ITV.

As ITV News' health and science editor, Morgan led the network's coverage of the COVID-19 pandemic in the United Kingdom, including the first reporting from inside an acute COVID ward, at the Royal Bournemouth Hospital in 2020, the controversy about PPE contracts, and Long Covid. Her last story was on patients paying for private health care because of long waiting lists at the NHS, and she had also recently begun reporting on climate change, for example in March 2023 on victims of the 2022 Pakistan floods still living with high water.

== Personal life and death ==
Morgan married Rob Kinnaird in 2009; they had two daughters. She lived in Hurstpierpoint, near Brighton. She died on 26 May 2023, at the age of 45, from lung cancer; she had been diagnosed the previous month.
