= Nick Hayes =

English illustrator and campaigner (born 1982)

- Born: 1982 (age 43–44)
- Occupations: writer, illustrator, and campaigner

Nick Hayes (born 1982) is a British writer, illustrator, and campaigner for land access. He has written a number of graphic novels and a non-fiction book, The Book of Trespass.

== Life and work ==
Hayes grew up in Upper Basildon, Berkshire. He attended Abingdon School from 1995 to 2000.

He works as an illustrator. In 2004 he was a founding editor of Meat Magazine.

In August 2020, Hayes and Guy Shrubsole launched a campaign on freedom to roam in England, called Right to Roam. In July 2021 he and Shrubsole collaborated with Landscapes of Freedom and David Bangs to organise a mass trespass on the Sussex Downs to raise awareness of the failings of the 2000 CROW act, which Shrubsole claims still only gives the public access to 8% of land and 3% of rivers in England.

== Publications ==
=== Graphic novels ===
- The Rime of the Modern Mariner. Jonathan Cape, 2011. ISBN 978-0224090254.
- Woody Guthrie and the Dust Bowl Ballads. Harry N. Abrams, 2016. ISBN 978-1419719455.
- Cormorance. Jonathan Cape, 2016. ISBN 978-1910702055.
- The Drunken Sailor. Jonathan Cape, 2018. ISBN 978-1910702062.

=== Non-fiction books ===
- The Book of Trespass: Crossing the Lines that Divide Us. London: Bloomsbury, 2020. ISBN 9781526604699.

== See also ==
- Trespass to land in English law
- List of Old Abingdonians
