= David Bangs =

British writer and conservationist

Dave Bangs
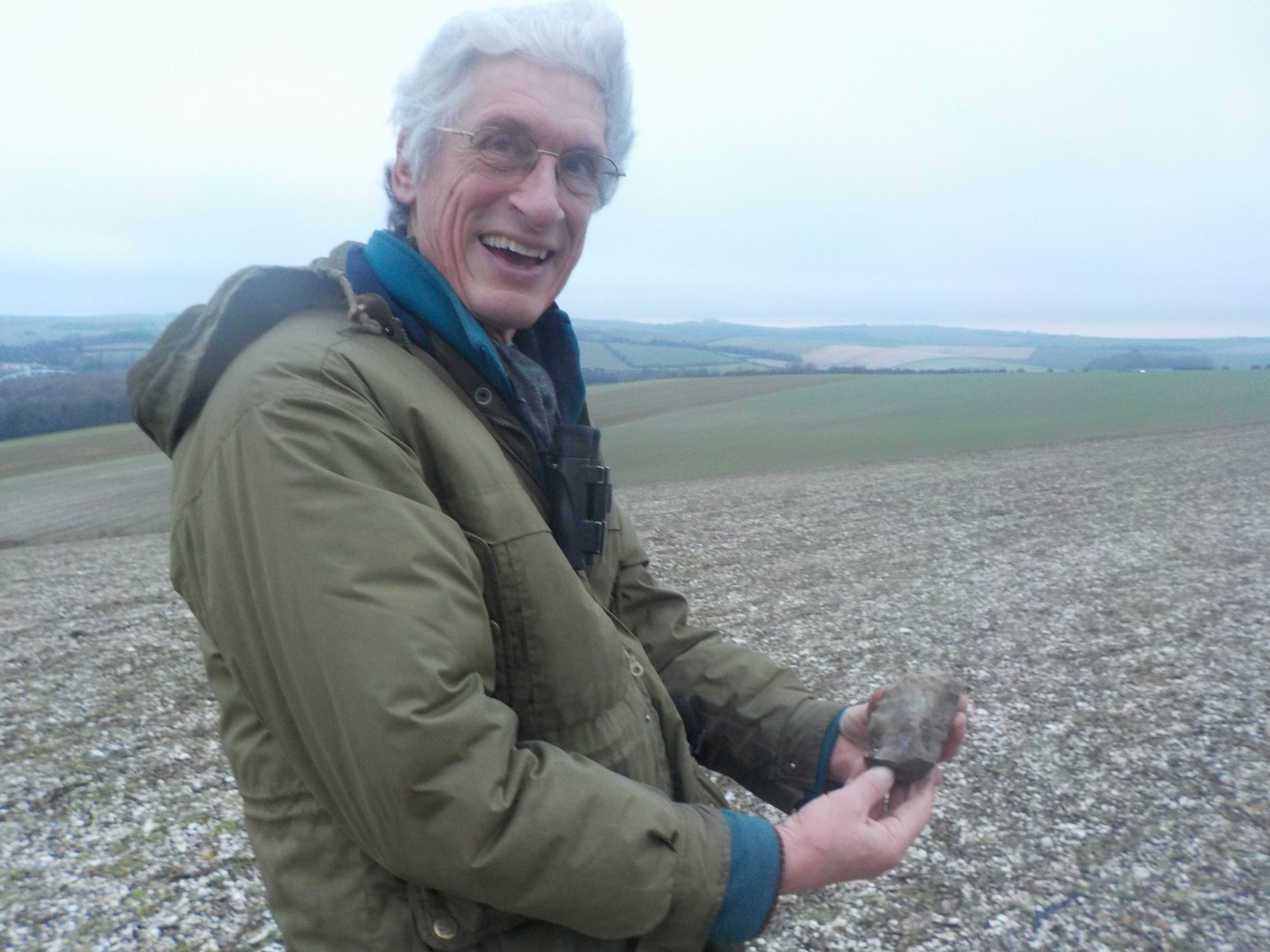
- Bangs having just found a Neolithic axe head on the Brighton Downs, January 2021.
- Occupations: Field naturalist, conservationist and author
- Writing career
- Notable work: The Land of the Brighton Line

Tolpuddle Martyrs Mural
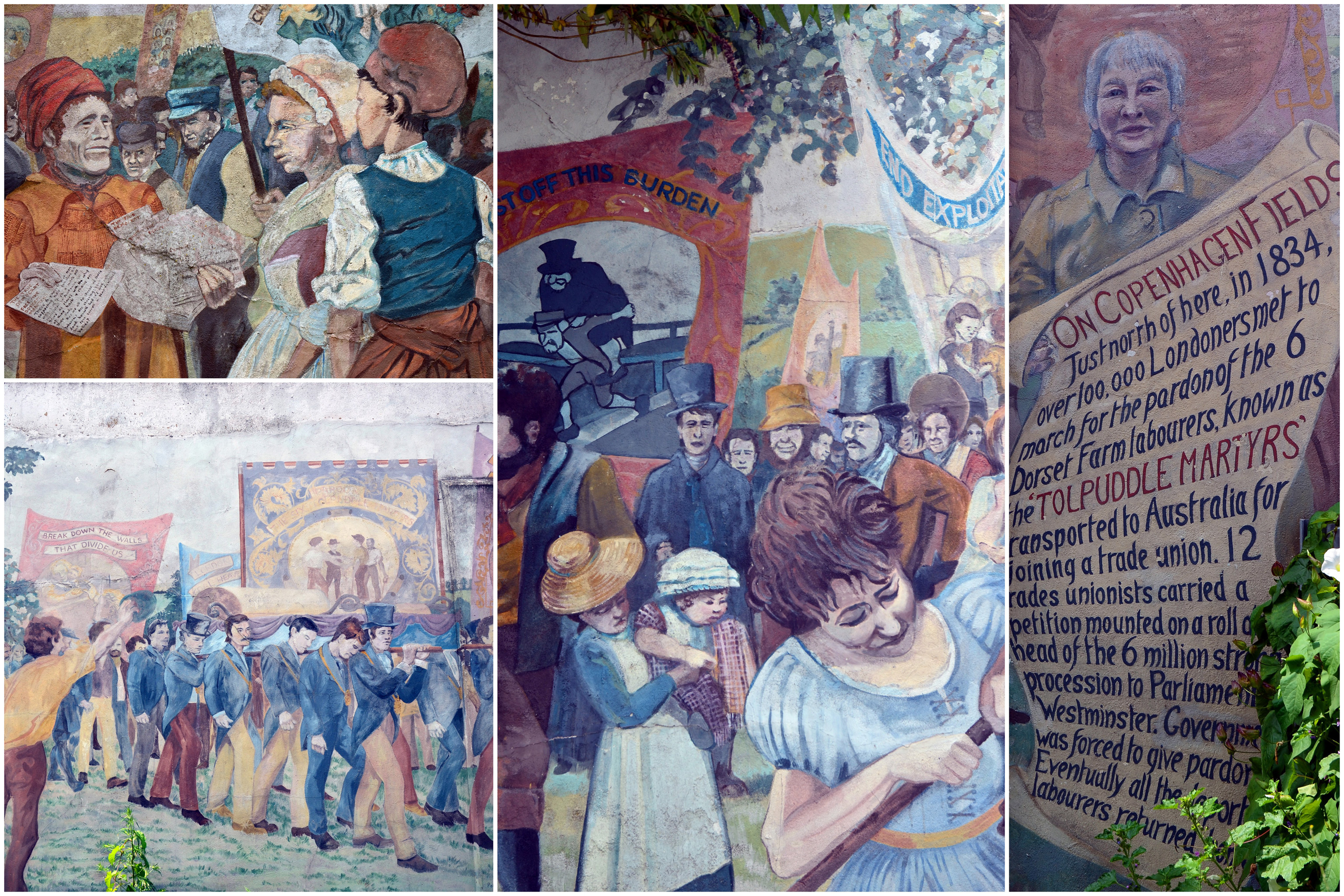
- Edward Square, Copenhagen Street, London Borough of Islington
- Artist: David Bangs
- Year: 1984
- Subject: Depicting the 1834 march to Westminster to petition for the pardon of the six Dorset farm labourers who were 'guilty' of, effectively, joining a trade union.

Dave Bangs is a field naturalist, social historian, public artist, author and conservationist. He has written extensively on countryside management, both historically and present day in the English county of Sussex.

== Biography ==
Bangs was co-leader of the Sussex Access Campaign and its programme of mass trespasses that helped build pressure for the enactment of a partial right to roam in the CROW Act (Countryside and Rights of Way Act, 2000).

Bangs has campaigned on a number of fronts to protect access rights to the Sussex Downland. He is the co-founder of Keep Our Downs Public. In 2016 councils across Sussex threatened to privatise large areas of the Downs, including Brighton Council's Downland Estate, Worthing Council's Downland Estate, and Eastbourne Council's Downland Estate. Bangs was in the leadership teams of successful campaigns to prevent their sale from public ownership to private ownership.

In 2021 he has co-founded the Landscapes of Freedom project and collaborated with Nick Hayes and Guy Shrubsole to protest the short fallings of the CROW act, which Shrubsole claims still only gives the public access to 8% of land and 3% of rivers in England.

Landscapes of Freedom organised a mass trespass of three hundred plus people on 24 July 2021 where 300 people walked from the Waterhall, Brighton to Pangdean Bottom to protest the statistic that Hayes called a "national scandal". Bangs said reconnecting people with nature is "crucial for stopping global ecocide". In a speech given at the event he said,

“If people cannot be in nature, people can’t defend it. What the eye cannot see, the heart cannot grieve. Brighton council must designate all downland under its management as statutory access land”.

On 24 September 2022, Landscapes of Freedom organised another mass trespass of a similar scale under the banner ‘Worth Forest is worth saving’ - to stand against plans for a Center Parcs holiday resort at the ancient woodland of Oldhouse Warren. The campaign was ultimately successful and Center Parcs pulled out of the project citing biodiversity concerns.

In 2026, Bangs concerns turned to saving the local "Sussex Tiger" sea trout population, which faces severe decline due to water course mismanagement and habitat loss within the River Ouse catchment. In February 2026, he featured on ITV News highlighting the ecological risks posed by proposed major housing developments in Cooksbridge, and in August of that year, he helped organise a mass trespass along the North End Stream to raise awareness of the existential threat to the species.

Additionally, Bangs worked as a public mural painter in central London from 1980 to 1990. He has co-led other successful campaigns such as 'Defend Council Housing' which campaigned against the privatisation (stock transfer) of the City of Brighton's council housing (2005–2007). Bangs has appeared on Radio 4's Today Programme, Farming Today and Pebble Mill at One and he has also appeared on the BBC1 programme Countryfile.

== Works authored ==
Bangs has written three books, Whitehawk Hill: Where the Turf meets the Surf, a landscape history and natural history of Brighton’s most remarkable Downland survival (2004), A Freedom to Roam Guide to the Brighton Downs: from Shoreham to Newhaven and Beeding to Lewes (2008) and The Land of the Brighton Line: A Field Guide to the Middle Sussex and Southeast Surrey Weald (2018).

His first two works concern themselves with fauna, flora and land ownership of the Sussex Downland around the city of Brighton, England, and the threats posed to them by farms, housing developments and other socioeconomic forces. His latest work, The Land of the Brighton Line, is about the Sussex Weald. The work is of importance as reviewer Ted Benton notes as it "expresses a deeply engaged and embodied presence in the environment" from "someone who over many years has walked the footpaths, occasionally trespassed, counted the wildflowers and listened to the birds". Benton continues "Bangs seems able to recount and explain the losses while continuing to take delight in what remains. The threats, in general terms, are those affecting historic landscapes everywhere – public access and enjoyment, biodiversity and aesthetics harmed or destroyed by advancing urbanisation and agribusiness-driven intensification"

Bangs has co-produced and narrated a number of videos including two that describe the ownership and ecological status of the Brighton Downs; Brightons Big Secret - The Downland We Own and Our Rainforest in Miniature: Chalk Grassland and its Wildlife.

He hosted the BBC2 programme This Land: Coppers and Bangs, which was recommended in The Times "Today's Viewing Choice" and The Independent's "Pick of the Day". The Independent's review described Bangs as, "A committed advocate of the right to roam" and said, "Bangs has made it his mission to compile a companion to the wildlife of the Sussex Downs, which he feels is endangered by modern developments".

Bangs created many public murals in central London from 1980 to 1990, including contributions to the Brixton murals and a mural commemorating the Tolpuddle Martyrs. Photos of his murals, painted between 1977 and 1990, are on display on the For Walls With Tongues project. His murals often took inspiration from nature.

== Political views ==
Bangs is an eco-socialist. He recognises capitalism as a system that is destroying nature and the necessary habitats for nature's ongoing survival.

== Personal life ==
Bangs feels a strong attachment to the county of Sussex and his family moved back to Hove in 1958, when he was seven. From nine or ten years old his main preoccupation has been with the countryside. He went to Reading University and then to St Martin's College of Art, where he says he was "untrained" at being an artist. He was one of the 'Huntley Street 14' with Piers Corbyn who got charged with conspiracy after the eviction of a big squat in 1978. The charges were dropped. He returned to Brighton after 25 years away, largely living in Kings Cross, London. He has been a public artist (mostly painting murals), a care worker, and a gardener.
