= Land ownership in the United Kingdom =

Land ownership in the United Kingdom is distributed in a Pareto-like distribution, with a relatively small number of organisations and estates, and to a lesser extent people, owning large amounts, whether by area or value, and much larger numbers owning small amounts or no land at all.

== Large land owners by area ==
Land ownership by area does not correspond to land ownership by value. The value of land varies widely, depending on location but also condition, contaminated land might constitute a liability. The value of land being eroded by the sea or other natural processes declines rapidly. Land in the centre of large cities may be very valuable, for example £7.2 million per hectare was cited for central London in 2016, compared with around £2500 per hectare for grouse moors in Scotland.

The government (together with its QUANGOs) is the biggest land owner by area, the Forestry Commission owning some 2,200,000 acres (890,000 ha), the MoD 1,101,851 acres (445,903 ha), the Crown Estate 678,420 acres (274,550 ha), DEFRA 116,309 acres (47,069 ha) and Homes England 19,349 acres (7,830 ha). Other large central government landowners include the Environment Agency and National Highways, apart from extensive local government holdings. Merton College, Oxford University owns 14,707 acres (5,952 ha), and other colleges and universities have varying land holdings, from campus, playing fields and accommodation to significant endowments in town and country.

The Duchies of Cornwall and Lancaster (separate from the Crown Estate) are both significant landowners holding 135,000 acres (54,632 ha) and 45,000 acres (18,200 ha) respectively.

The largest Corporate landowner in the United Kingdom is United Utilities with 138,379 acres (56,000 ha), which manages water and wastewater for the North West of England.

Charities, trusts and the Church of England are also significant land owners. The National Trust and the National Trust for Scotland own 589,748 acres (238,663 ha), the RSPB 332,000 acres (134,000 ha), the Duke of Atholl's Trusts 145,000 acres (59,000 ha), the Church of England 105,000 acres (42,000 ha), The Woodland Trust own 81,544 acres (33,000 ha), and the Honourable Artillery Company 14,209 acres (5,750 ha).

== Common land ==
An amount of land is common land, which refers to rights to the land which are in common. This land may be owned but the rights are still held in common, for example a right to roam.
