= Wolstonbury Hill =

Protected area in West Sussex, England

Coordinates: 50.909°N 0.175°W

- Site of Special Scientific Interest
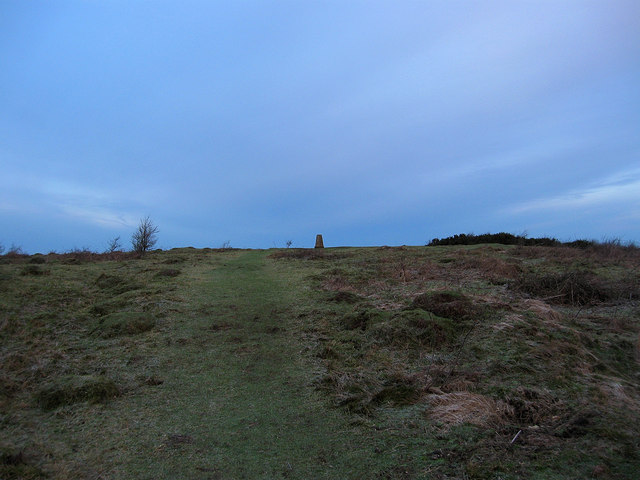
- Location of Wolstonbury Hill.
- Area of search: West Sussex
- Grid reference: TQ 284 138
- Interest: Biological
- Area: 58.9 hectares (146 acres)
- Notification date: 1986
- Location map: Magic Map

Wolstonbury Hill is a 58.9-hectare (146-acre) biological Site of Special Scientific Interest south-west of in West Sussex, within South Downs National Park. It is owned by the National Trust and part of it is a Scheduled Monument.

== Description ==
Rising to a maximum height of 206 metres (676 ft), Wolstonbury projects into the Weald from the main ridge of the South Downs giving views of both the Downs and the Weald. Views across the Weald to the north are panoramic, to the east are the Clayton Windmills and Ditchling Beacon beyond. Hollingbury is prominent to the southeast. Looking west one can see Newtimber Hill, West Hill with Devils Dyke just beyond, further out Chanctonbury Ring is clearly visible.

Wolstonbury, owned and maintained by the National Trust, is listed as a scheduled monument.

== Access ==
No roads or car parks lie close to the summit so visitors have to ascend on foot or by mountain bike.

== Geology ==
South of Hurstpierpoint ridge, the clay vale lies beneath the jutting profile and complex scarp and foot of Wolstonbury Hill.

The approach from the north is characterised by a network of linked or closely-spaced woodlands (some parts ancient) centred on the designed landscape at Danny House.

== Flora and fauna ==
At least 11 species of orchid can be found on Wolstonbury Hill, including the Man Orchid (Orchis anthroporum), one of only three sites in Sussex. Obviously, due to its rarity, the exact location is known to only a few and not divulged openly.

From early spring until autumn, you’ll find over 30 species of butterfly including the Adonis Blue, another rarity and classified as a species of conservation concern. Part of the success of the survival of the Adonis blue butterfly on Wolstonbury Hill is due to the managed grazing. Allowing livestock to graze instead of mowing the grassland allows ant hills to become widespread. Each of these ant hills contain a colony of ants which have a symbiotic relationship with the Adonis blue. The butterfly chrysalis is protected by ants until it hatches into a caterpillar. The ants milk the sweet sugary honeydew from the caterpillar’s gland, and in return the ants guard the growing caterpillars from predatory wasps.

== Archeology and history ==
The remains at the site include a 2.2-hectare (5.4-acre) early Bronze Age enclosure now referred to as Wolstonbury C. A possible inner enclosure known as Wolstonbury A appears to be older, due to it being overlain by C. Wolstonbury B is another possible enclosure sandwiched between A and C, its presence indicated by a survey conducted in 1994 by the Royal Commission on the Historical Monuments of England. Excavations done by Bournemouth University in 1995 suggest that Wolstonbury A and B may be field lynchets.

Skeletons were reportedly unearthed during flint digging operations begun in 1765. This digging continued until the mid-19th century, resulting in extensive damage to the site. Unknown quantities of Neolithic and early Bronze Age flintwork were discovered in a 1929 dig as well as "Romano-British" pottery, animal bones, and hammerstones.
