= Grogan (disambiguation) =

Grogan may refer to:

== People ==
- Grogan (surname), a surname of Irish origin
- Grogan baronets (1859-1927)
  - Sir Edward Grogan, 2nd Baronet (1873-1927)
  - Sir Edward Grogan, 1st Baronet (1802-1891)

== Places ==
- Grogan, Georgia, United States, see List of places in Georgia (U.S. state) (E–H)
- Grogan, Minnesota, USA; an unincorporated community
- Grogan, Missouri, USA; a ghost town
- Grogan, New South Wales, in Temora Shire, Australia
- Grogan Morgan Range, Nunavut; mountain range in Canada
- Grogan, Columbus, Ohio, USA; a neighborhood in the unincorporated community of Milo-Grogan
- Grogan Creek, North Carolina, USA; a creek that feeds Cedar Rock Falls

=== Facilities and structures ===
- William H. Grogan House, Brevard, Transylvania County, North Carolina, USA; a NRHP listed building
- Johnson-Grogan Highway, Brevard County, Florida, USA

== Other uses ==
- The Grogans, Australian garage rock band
- Grogan Medal, Australian rules football award

== See also ==
- Groganville, Queensland, Australia
