= Edward Grogan =

Edward Grogan may refer to:

- Sir Edward Grogan, 1st Baronet (1802–1891), MP for Dublin City, 1841–1865
- Sir Edward Grogan, 2nd Baronet (1873–1927), British Army officer

== See also ==
- Grogan baronets
- Grogan (surname)
