= Reginald Southwell Smith =

Reginald Southwell Smith (1809–1896) was an English priest of the Church of England, known for evangelical views.

== Early life ==
He was the fourth son of Sir John Wyldbore Smith, 2nd Baronet, and his wife Elizabeth Anne Marriott. He was educated at Winchester College, and matriculated at Balliol College, Oxford in 1826, graduating B.A. in 1830, M.A. in 1834. He rowed stroke in the Balliol boat.#

Smith was ordained, and became a curate to Frederick Parry Hodges, a Fellow of Winchester College, at Lyme Regis. According to Smith's granddaughter Lady Grogan, Hodges was autocratic. John Fowles wrote that Hodges had "an equal detestation of both Calvin and Rome." Wanklyn wrote in Lyme Regis: A Retrospect (1922):

In doctrine Dr. Hodges was an Evangelical of the school predominant in the Church of England in his young days, before the starting of the Oxford movement. His sermons, which constantly overran the hour, were chiefly directed against Romanism as the enemy [...].

== Rector ==
In 1836 Smith became rector of West Stafford, Dorset, after the death of the incumbent William Ireland in November 1835. He owed the preferment to his college friend John Floyer, whose mother Elizabeth was patron of the parish. His diocesan was James Henry Monk, Bishop of Gloucester and Bristol, a conservative churchman and no friend to Bristol-area evangelicals.

The same year Smith married Emily Simpson. Shortly he began to be treated as an invalid, suffering from tuberculosis. He and his young family moved to Ventnor for a period in 1841.

== Madeira and aftermath ==
The Smiths then went to Madeira, at the suggestion of Edward Denison, Bishop of Salisbury, at a time when Smith's life was supposed to be in danger, sailing as a family on the packet boat Dart on 1 October 1841, They spent two years on the island, returning in 1843.

The Protestant missionary M. J. Gonsalves commented that Maria II of Portugal allowed two chapels with English-language preachers on Madeira, mentioning "Protestant Episcopal", "Rev. Mr. Smith, rector, is an evangelical, experimental, excellent preacher." Smith later wrote of religious repression on Madeira.

The Smiths met Robert Reid Kalley socially in November 1841. He wrote in 1844 to Smith about violence against Protestants. Andrew Combe, who noted Smith's letter to Alexander Haldane's The Record on behalf of Kalley's self-assigned mission on Madeira, called Smith his "great friend", who had witnessed Kalley's preaching in Portuguese. The Disruption of 1843 led to the formation of the Free Church of Scotland, to which Kalley adhered, and which sent a delegation to Smith. "A. M. of Dorchester" wrote to John Bull stating that Smith was "openly patronising schism." The 1844 edition of Emily Smith's Panoramic View of Funchal in lithograph was also connected with the wish to raise the profile of the religious strife on the island.

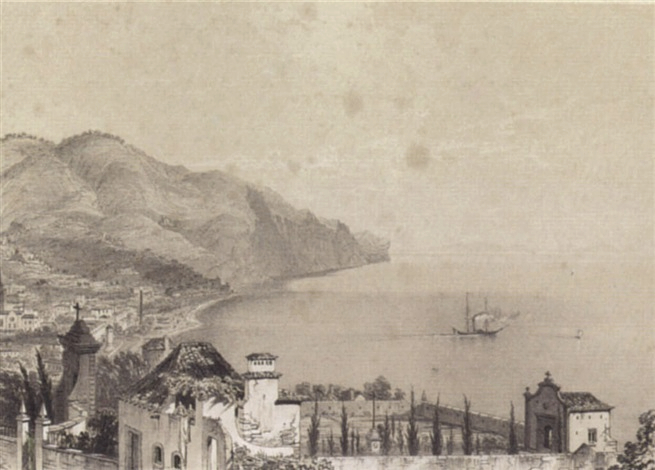
A panoramic view of the city of Funchal, in the Island of Madeira, lithograph by Louis Haghe after a sketch by Emily Smith

== Later life ==
Around this period Smith was in Weymouth, Dorset and encountered there the sect of Agapemonites. He with the Rev. Henry Moule, whose living of Fordington adjoined West Stafford to the west, confronted the sect's leaders Henry James Prince and Samuel Starkey.

Smith associated in evangelical causes such as the Irish Amelioration Society with Robert Jocelyn, 3rd Earl of Roden, and had one of the Earl's relations, Horace Noel, as a curate. Noel was at West Stafford c.1848 to 1858, when he went to St Peter's Church, Exton as a curate. He filled in for Smith who was often too ill to hold services. He also associated with the young Thomas Hardy, who was to become a family friend of the Smiths, and recognised socially by a dinner invitation from the class-conscious Smiths in 1874. Reginald Smith was seriously ill in 1858, after Noel left, with a disease thought by Margaret Smith to be possibly typhoid.

In 1875 Smith became a canon of Salisbury Cathedral. He died at his rectory on 28 December 1895.

== Works ==
- The French Revolution of 1848, Viewed in the Light of Prophecy (1848), sermon. "The words on Chartism are few but excellent." (The Quarterly Journal of Prophecy, 1849.)
- The Question of the Day. The "Real Presence" Considered (1872). This was an intervention on the evangelical side with Hugh M'Neile of a dispute in John Bull on ritualism in the Church of England. The same year, however, Smith recorded a positive view of the acquittal of W. J. E. Bennett, on the same theological issue.
- The Crisis of the Church of England in the Avowed Attempt of Some of Her Ministers to Set Up the Confessional (1873)
- Impressions on Revisiting the Churches of Belgium and Rhenish Prussia (1875)

== Family ==
Smith married in 1836 Emily Genevieve Simpson (1817–1877), daughter of Henry Hanson Simpson and his wife Marianne Dauberly. She was an accomplished musician, particularly noted as a singer. She sketched and painted in watercolour, a collection of her work being at the Museu Quinta das Cruzes in Funchal. She was a diarist, and her diaries for 1836, 1841, 1852, 1858 and 1866 are extant.

Emily Simpson lost her father in April 1835; he had been a socially prominent wit in Bath, Somerset. She had become serious about religion about the age of 17, influenced by evangelical views, and thought highly of the Rev. Edward Tottenham, a Trinity College, Dublin graduate at the Kensington Chapel, a proprietary chapel on Kensington Place, Bath. She was a strict moralist. Her mother took Emily to Lyme Regis after her father died. There both Hodges and Smith fell in love with her: Smith, the baronet's son, was preferred.

The couple had a family of four sons and six daughters, with a son Herbert and daughter Constance who died young. The children included:

- Henry John Smith (1838–1879), married 1874 Alice Bertha Wickham, daughter of the Rev. Edmund Dawe Wickham.
- Reginald Bosworth Smith (1839–1908). His eldest daughter Ellinor Flora married firstly Harry Langhorne Thompson in 1894, and secondly in 1907 Sir Edward Grogan, 2nd Baronet.
- Emily Anna (1840–1879), married John Shearme Thomas. Their daughter Betha Nisbet Wolferstan (born 1870) married Thomas Kirkland Rylands and was mother of Dadie Rylands.
- Harriet Mary-Anne Smith (1843–1857), born on Madeira.
- Ellinor Theophila Smith (1845–1863).
- Walter William Marriott Smith (1846–1944) of the Royal Artillery. He married Alice Ley.
- Alice Christiana Smith (1848–1946), diarist. Did not marry.
- Edward Floyer Noel Smith (1850–1908), cleric. Did not marry.
- Evangeline Frances Smith (1853–1945), novelist. Did not marry.
- Caroline Blanche Smith (1855–1913), married in 1884 Richard Egerton, son of Caledon Egerton, and was mother of Sir Philip Reginald le Belward Grey Egerton, 14th Baronet.

Thomas Hardy as a family friend certainly knew Henry, Reginald Bosworth, Alice, Evangeline, and Caroline Blanche. In the next generation, Walter's son Harry became a neighbour of Hardy's. He knew Emily Smith as Geneviève, and expressed admiration for her background in a bread-and-butter letter to her of the mid-1870s, after a dinner made awkward by the butler's disapproval of Hardy's dealings with his daughter.
