= Groman =

Groman is a surname. Notable people with the surname include:

- Bill Groman (1936–2020), American football player
- Herman Groman (1882–1954), American athlete
- Vladimir Groman (1874–1940), Russian economist

== See also ==
- Gorman (surname)
- Grogan
- Roman (surname)
