= Shropham =

Civil parish in Norfolk, England

Coordinates: 52.500°N 0.922°E

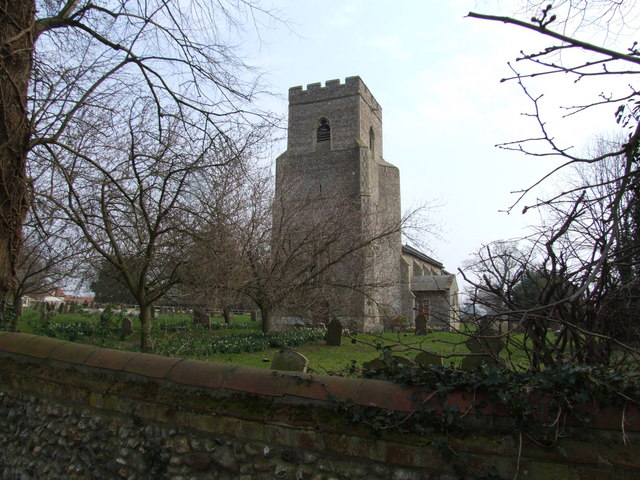
- St Peter and St Paul, Shropham

- Location within Norfolk
- Area: 11.12 km^{2} (4.29 sq mi)
- Population: 351
  - Density: 32/km^{2} (83/sq mi)
- OS grid reference: TL984931
- Civil parish: Shropham
- District: Breckland
- Shire county: Norfolk
- Region: East
- Country: England
- Sovereign state: United Kingdom
- Post town: ATTLEBOROUGH
- Postcode district: NR17
- Dialling code: 01953
- Police: Norfolk
- Fire: Norfolk
- Ambulance: East of England

Shropham is a civil parish in the English county of Norfolk. It covers an area of 11.12 km^{2} (4.29 sq mi) and had a population of 351 in 155 households at the 2001 census. For the purposes of local government, it falls within the district of Breckland.

Its main attraction is the Grade I listed Church of St Peter and St Paul, built in flint in the Perpendicular style. Shropham Hall is an early Georgian country house; it was completed by 1729 for John Barker, later High Sheriff of Norfolk.

The village is listed in the Domesday Book of 1086 under the name Scerpham.

Historically the hundred of Shropham included many further parishes.

== Notable residents ==
- Sir Edward Grogan, 2nd Baronet
- Mary E. Mann (1848–1929), writer, lived in the village.
- Justin Fashanu (1961–1998) and John Fashanu (1962-), footballers, used to live in the village
