= Charles Burton (judge) =

English-born barrister and judge

Charles Burton (1760–1847) was an English-born barrister and judge who spent most of his professional career in Ireland.

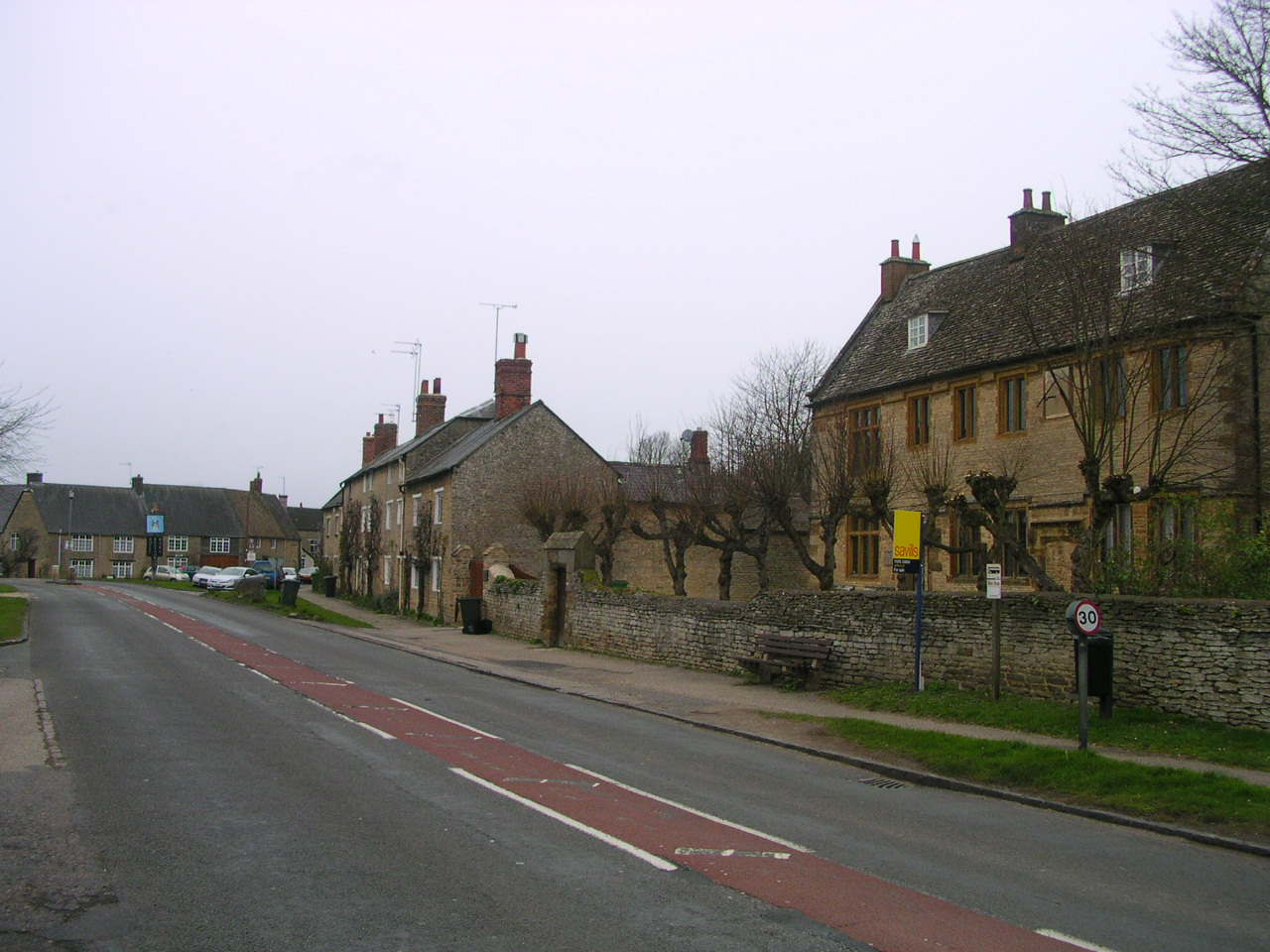
Aynho, Northamptonshire, Burton's birthplace

== Early life ==
He was born at Aynho in Northamptonshire, second son of Francis Burton and Anna Singer. The Burton family were originally from Leicestershire. His brother Edmund, a solicitor who practised in Daventry, had several children, including Sir William Westbrooke Burton (1794–1888), a judge and statesman in Australia, whose second wife was Charles' granddaughter Maria Alphonsine West. He entered Middle Temple, and subsequently Lincoln's Inn. Ball states that he was never called to the English Bar, although he practised as an attorney in the King's Bench. He was befriended by the leading Irish barrister John Philpot Curran, who persuaded him that his future lay in Ireland. He was called to the Irish Bar in 1792 and took silk in 1806.

== Career ==
He was a man of great erudition, who was described, no doubt with some exaggeration, as the most learned man ever to practice at the Irish Bar. He was also an exceptionally hard worker, and above all a superb advocate. He made his reputation with his speech for the defendant, which was described as "a masterpiece of eloquence", in the leading quo warranto case, R. v. Waller O'Grady, in 1816, where the Crown challenged the right of Standish O'Grady, 1st Viscount Guillamore, the Chief Baron of the Irish Exchequer to appoint his younger son as a Court clerk.

Thereafter his career advanced rapidly: he became Third Serjeant in 1817, Second Serjeant in 1818, and a judge of the Court of King's Bench (Ireland) in 1820. He was one of the last Englishmen to be elevated to the Irish Bench. He enjoyed a high reputation as a judge, being described as calm, dignified and impartial.

== Judicial career ==
His most memorable trial was that of Daniel O'Connell for conspiracy in 1844: while there were several judges on the Court, it was Burton who passed the sentence of imprisonment, which was later quashed by the House of Lords. Burton was by then a very old man and his mental and physical faculties were probably failing: several witnesses claimed that he was asleep during the trial. However one obituary of the judge maintained that O'Connell, in general, a stern critic of the Irish judiciary, actually admired Burton. Burton was also described as a judge who was entirely free of party political bias.

Just as Curran had been his mentor, so Burton acted as mentor to the young Gerald Fitzgibbon, encouraging him to pursue a legal career, and thus helping to found one of Ireland's most remarkable legal dynasties.

He was a member of the Royal Dublin Society, and renowned for his classical learning. He lived mainly in Dublin, where he changed his residence several times, finally settling at Mount Anville. He also had a house at Eyrecourt in County Galway. He died in Dublin in 1847 and was buried in St. Peter's Church, Aungier Street, Dublin (the church was demolished in the 1980s).

== Family ==
He married in 1787 Anna Andrews, of whose parentage and background little is known. She died in 1822. They had one daughter:

- Eliza-Felicia, who in 1819 married John Beattie West, MP for Dublin, by whom she had issue:
  - Charles Burton-West;
  - Anna Felicia, who married Sir Croker Barrington, 4th Baronet,
  - Maria Alphonsine, who married her cousin, the Australian judge Sir William Westbrooke Burton (son of Charles' brother Edmund),
  - Charlotte, who married Sir Henry Vansittart Stonhouse, 15th Baronet.
