= Robert Hutton (politician) =

Irish Whig politician

Member of Parliament for Dublin City
- In office 31 July 1837 – 10 July 1841 Serving with Daniel O'Connell
- Preceded by: George Alexander Hamilton; John Beattie West
- Succeeded by: John Beattie West; Edward Grogan

Personal details
- Died: 23 August 1870
- Party: Whig

Robert Hutton (died 23 August 1870) was an Irish Whig politician.

Hutton was first elected Whig MP for Dublin City at the 1837 general election but was defeated at the next election in 1841. He married in 1821 Caroline Crompton, daughter of Peter Crompton. Their eldest son was Crompton Hutton (1822–1910), a barrister.

Parliament of the United Kingdom
Preceded by George Alexander Hamilton; John Beattie West	Member of Parliament for Dublin City; 1837–1841; With: Daniel O'Connell	Succeeded by John Beattie West; Edward Grogan
