= John Grogan (disambiguation) =

John Grogan (born 1957) is an American journalist and non-fiction writer.

John Grogan may also refer to:

- John Grogan (politician) (born 1961), former Labour Member of Parliament for Keighley
- John Grogan (hurler) (born 1956), Irish retired hurler
- John J. Grogan (1914–1968), American labor union leader and New Jersey politician
- John S. Grogan (1880–1952), American football, basketball, and baseball player and coach

== See also ==
- Grogan (surname)
