= Sir Philip Reginald le Belward Grey Egerton, 14th Baronet =

Sir Philip Reginald le Belward Grey Egerton, 14th Baronet JP DL (3 September 1885 – 9 June 1962) was an English landowner.

== Life ==
He was the son of Colonel Caledon Philip Grey Egerton and Caroline Blanche, daughter of Rev. Reginald Southwell Smith. His father was commanding officer of 39th Regional District of the Raj, and a Colonel of the Dorset Regiment.

Sir Philip was a soldier commissioned into the Territorial Army of the Royal Artillery. He was with the Sudan Civil Service; and with the 3rd battalion of Shropshire Light Infantry won a 4th clasp of the Order of the Nile. In 1941 he was appointed High Sheriff of Cheshire. The 13th baronet, Rev Sir Brooke, who adopted the added surname Grey-Egerton, died childless, without an heir on 5 November 1945. As his nearest male relative, a second cousin, Sir Philip was the next in line.

In 1947 he was appointed Honorary Colonel of 521 Long Range Artillery Regiment.

== Family ==
He married in 1916, Dorothy Aveys. She was elder twin daughter of Brigadier John Henry Balguy, RA, of Duffield, Brockhampton, Dorset by his first wife, Mary, daughter of William Smith Nicholson of Eastmore, Yarmouth, Isle of Wight. They had two sons and a daughter:

- Sir Philip John Caledon Grey Egerton, 15th Baronet (born 1920)
- Brian Balguy Le Belward (born 1925)
- Mary Blanche Aveys; married on 1 August 1939 Vincent Ackroyd Palliser Costabadie FRCS Ed, DOMS (died 14 February 1959).

His first wife died on 26 April 1952, his second marriage was on 11 October 1961 to Kathleen, widow of Brian Thorburn Dickson, and daughter of Peter Crook, of Borwick Lodge, Ambleside. He died on 9 June 1962, and was succeeded by his son and heir.

== Notes ==
Baronetage of England
Preceded by Brooke Grey Egerton	Baronet (of Egerton and Oulton); 1945–1962	Succeeded by John Caledon Grey Egerton
