= Balbriggan (cloth) =

Type of hosiery fabric

- Type: Fabric
- Material: Cotton
- Production method: Knitting
- Place of origin: Balbriggan, Ireland

Balbriggan was a type of hosiery fabric. It was a finely knitted cotton cloth predominantly used for men's underwear. Originally it was made of unbleached Egyptian cotton that imparts natural coloured tones such as dark cream and tan. The fabric's name refers to the town in which it was manufactured, Balbriggan in Ireland. The town prospered as a result of the fabric's production.

== Structure ==
Balbriggan was a knitted fabric structure produced with a plain stitch on circular knitting machines. It was a lightweight fabric with a napped back on occasion.

== Use ==
Balbriggan was initially used for men's undergarments, later used in outerwear garments like Pyjamas and certain sportswear.

== See also ==
- Jersey (fabric)
