= George Alexander Hamilton =

British politician and civil servant

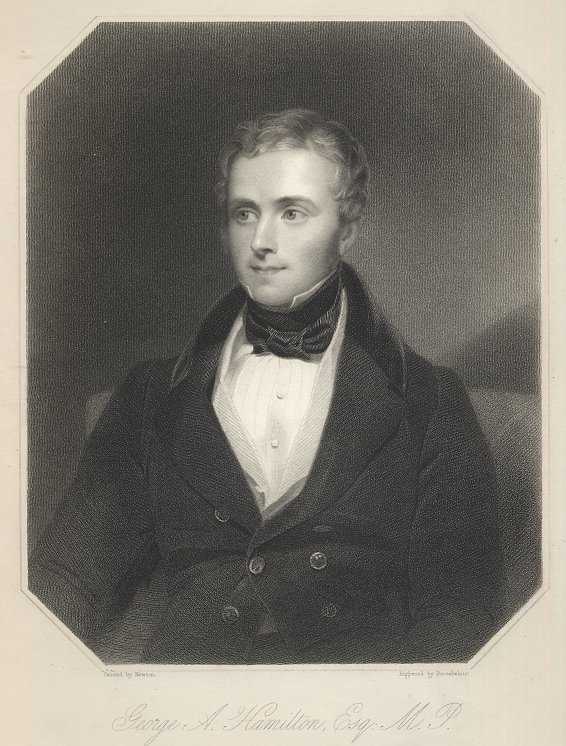
- Hamilton c. 1846

Permanent Secretary to the Treasury (Note: From 1859 to 1867 the position was known as Assistant Secretary to the Treasury)
- In office 1859–1870
- Preceded by: Charles Trevelyan (as Assistant Secretary to the Treasury)
- Succeeded by: Ralph Lingen

Member of Parliament for Dublin University
- In office 10 February 1843 – January 1859

Member of Parliament for Dublin City
- In office 13 April 1835 – 1837

Personal details
- Born: 29 August 1802 Downpatrick, United Kingdom
- Died: 17 September 1871 (aged 69) Kingstown, United Kingdom
- Education: Trinity College, Oxford

George Alexander Hamilton (29 August 1802 – 17 September 1871) was a minor British Conservative Party politician and later a prominent civil servant. He was an extremely zealous and active Protestant and a supporter of the Orange Order.

Hamilton was seated as a member of parliament (MP) for Dublin City on 13 April 1835, after a successful election petition. He represented this constituency until he was defeated in the general election of 1837. Hamilton was subsequently elected one of the MPs for Dublin University at a by-election on 10 February 1843 and continued to represent the seat until he resigned in January 1859.

He occupied the political post of Financial Secretary to the Treasury in the first (from 2 March 1852 until 17 December 1852) and second ministries of the Earl of Derby (2 March 1858 to January 1859). Hamilton was appointed Assistant Secretary to the Treasury in 1859 and Permanent Secretary to the Treasury in 1867. These were the most senior civil service posts in the Treasury at that time, and Hamilton continued to serve until 1870. He was made a member of the Privy Council of Ireland on 7 August 1869.

== Background ==
Hamilton was born at Tyrella, Downpatrick, County Down, on 29 August 1802. He was the elder son of the Rev. George Hamilton of Hampton Hall, Balbriggan, County Dublin, who died in March 1833 (first cousin of George Hamilton, the Canadian lumber baron), by Anna, daughter of Thomas Pepper of Ballygarth Castle, County Meath. His grandfather, George Hamilton (died 1793), who was a Baron of the Court of Exchequer (Ireland) from 1776 to 1793, was a younger brother of Hugh Hamilton, Bishop of Ossory. Hugh's descendants included C.S. Lewis.

He was sent to Rugby School in 1814, and matriculated from Trinity College, Oxford, on 15 December 1818, took his B.A. degree in 1821, and was created D.C.L. on 9 June 1853.

== MP and civil servant ==
Soon after leaving the university he settled on the paternal estate and began to take a part in public political meetings in Dublin. At the general election in 1826 he became a candidate for the constituency of Dublin City, but after a severe and expensive contest lasting fourteen days was defeated by a small majority.

In 1830 and 1832 he again unsuccessfully contested the seat for Dublin. At the close of another election for Dublin in January 1835 the numbers were: O'Connell 2,678, Ruthven 2,630, Hamilton 2,461, West 2,455. A petition was, however, presented; the commissioners sat from 3 May 1835 to 6 January 1836, and from 29 Feb to 26 May, when Hamilton and West were declared duly elected.

In the following year, 1837, he again contested Dublin unsuccessfully, and although in presenting a petition he was supported by "the Protestants of England", and a sum of money known as the Spottiswoode subscription was raised to assist him in paying his expenses, O'Connell on this occasion retained his seat. Throughout his career, he took the side of the Orangemen, and was a prominent figure in the Protestant demonstrations. On the formation of the Lay Association for the Protection of Church Property in August 1834, he became the honorary secretary of the association, and for a long period worked energetically in the cause. In parliament he was chiefly known as having presented the petition of the celebrated Protestant meeting of 14 January 1837, which gave rise to much discussion and subsequently to the Earl of Roden's committee of inquiry.

On 10 February 1843, on the occurrence of a chance vacancy, he was returned by Dublin University, which constituency he represented without intermission until February 1859. To him was mainly due the formation of the Conservative Society for Ireland, which formed the rallying point for the Irish Conservative Party after the passing of the Reform Bill. On 2 June 1845 he spoke on the subject of the 'godless college bill', as the measure which became the Queen's Colleges (Ireland) Act 1845 was popularly known, due to the fact that the three colleges it created could not give instruction in theology. Another speech of 21 August 1848 was printed with the title of Education in Ireland. Report of Speech in the House of Commons on Mr. Hamilton's motion on above subject, 1848. On 21 June 1849 his proposal for an alteration in education in Ireland so as to make it acceptable to the Protestant clergy was lost by 162 to 102 votes. He held the financial secretaryship of the treasury under Lord Derby's administration from March to December 1852, and again on the return of the conservatives to power from March 1858 to January 1859. At this latter date, he was appointed Permanent Secretary of the Treasury. He was sworn a member of the Privy Council of the United Kingdom on 7 August 1869, and in the following year was named one of the Commissioners of the Church Temporalities in Ireland. He was a magistrate and Deputy-Lieutenant for County Dublin, and an LL.D. of Dublin University.

From 1870 until his death, he served on a Commission of Inquiry into the King's Inns, Dublin.

== Private life ==
In his role as a local landowner and MP, he was, like his father and grandfather, very active in the commercial development of the town of Balbriggan, expanding the harbour facilities and encouraging the development of the local hosiery manufactory. He was chairman of the company that built the Great Northern Railway from Dublin to Belfast. A keen antiquarian, he conducted rescue archaeology on a major passage grave discovered at Gormanston, County Meath, in the course of the building of the railway and wrote reports on this and other archaeological discoveries in the proceedings of the Royal Dublin Society. During the Great Irish famine he chaired the Relief Committee in the Balrothery Union of parishes which provided soup, bread and meal to the starving throughout the North Fingal area.

== Death ==
He died in Kingstown (now Dún Laoghaire, Ireland), on 17 September 1871 and was buried in St George's church, Balbriggan. Despite his lifelong advocacy of unionism, the last few miles of the journey to his burial were lined by thousands of grieving Roman Catholics and he received a laudatory obituary in the Nationalist Freeman's Journal.

== Family ==
His wife, whom he married on 1 May 1835, was Amelia Fancourt, daughter of Joshua Uhthoff of Bath, Somerset, England. His father-in-law (whose family were originally from Bremen) had a distinguished career in the Colonial Civil Service, and became Deputy British Resident at Poona. Hamilton was a cousin of the colonial judge John Walpole Willis.

Parliament of the United Kingdom
Preceded by Daniel O'Connell; Edward Southwell Ruthven	Member of Parliament for Dublin City; 1835–1837; With: John Beattie West 1835–1837	Succeeded by Daniel O'Connell; Robert Hutton
Preceded by Sir Frederick Shaw, 3rd Baronet; Joseph Devonsher Jackson	Member of Parliament for Dublin University; 1843–1859; With: Sir Frederick Shaw, 3rd Baronet 1843–1848; Joseph Napier 1848–1858; Anthony Lefroy 1858–1859	Succeeded by Anthony Lefroy; James Whiteside
Political offices
Preceded by George Cornewall Lewis	Financial Secretary to the Treasury; 1852	Succeeded by James Wilson
Preceded by James Wilson	Financial Secretary to the Treasury; 1858–1859	Succeeded by Samuel Laing
Government offices
Preceded by Sir Charles Trevelyan	Assistant Secretary to the Treasury; 1859–1867	Treasury re-organised
New office	Permanent Secretary to the Treasury; 1867–1870	Succeeded by Sir Ralph Lingen
