= Balbriggan =

Town in north County Dublin, Ireland

Balbriggan Baile Brigín (Irish)
- Town
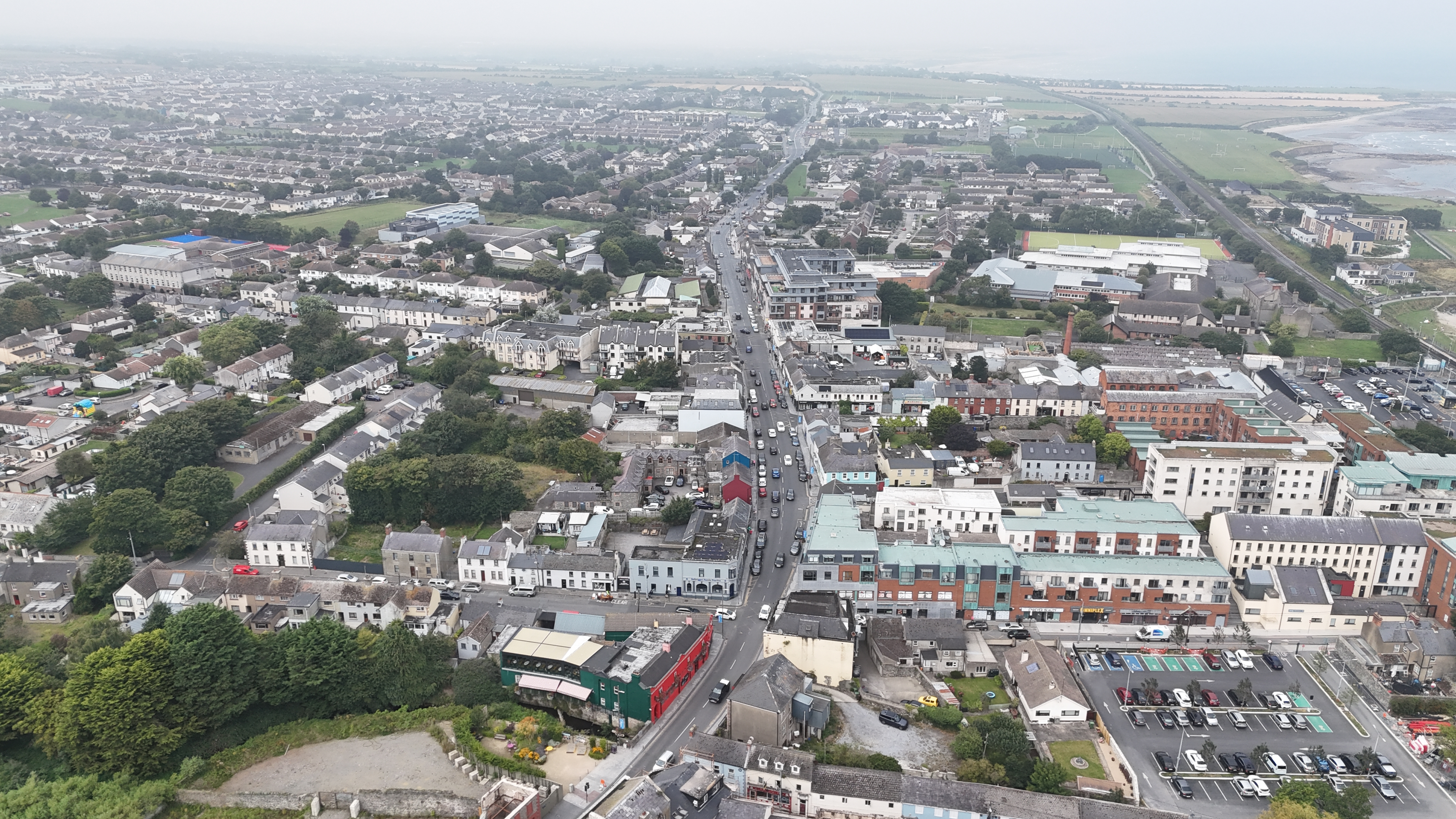
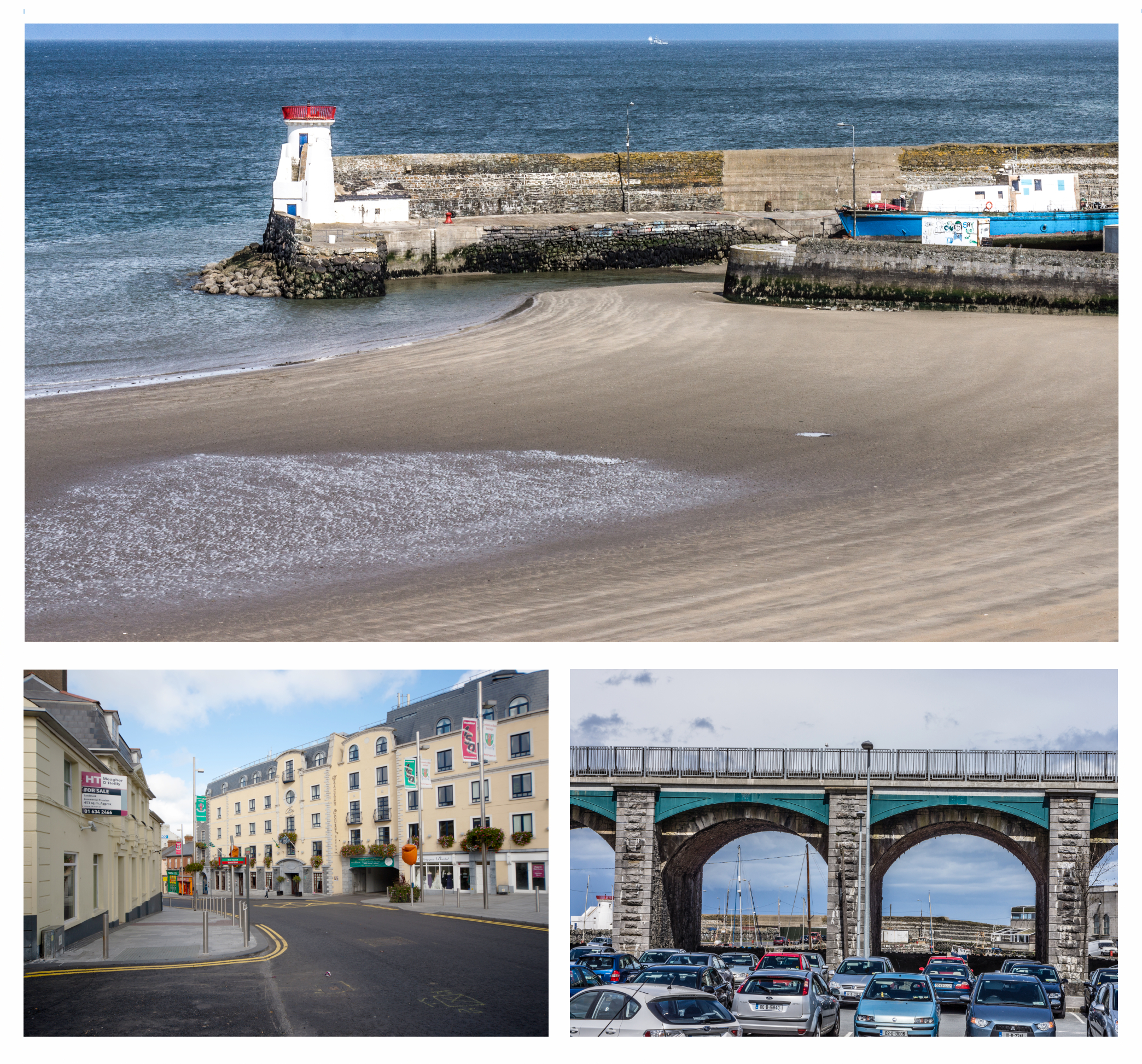
- Clockwise from top: the Old Lighthouse, Balbriggan; Balbriggan Harbour Railway Bridge; Bridge Street, Balbriggan

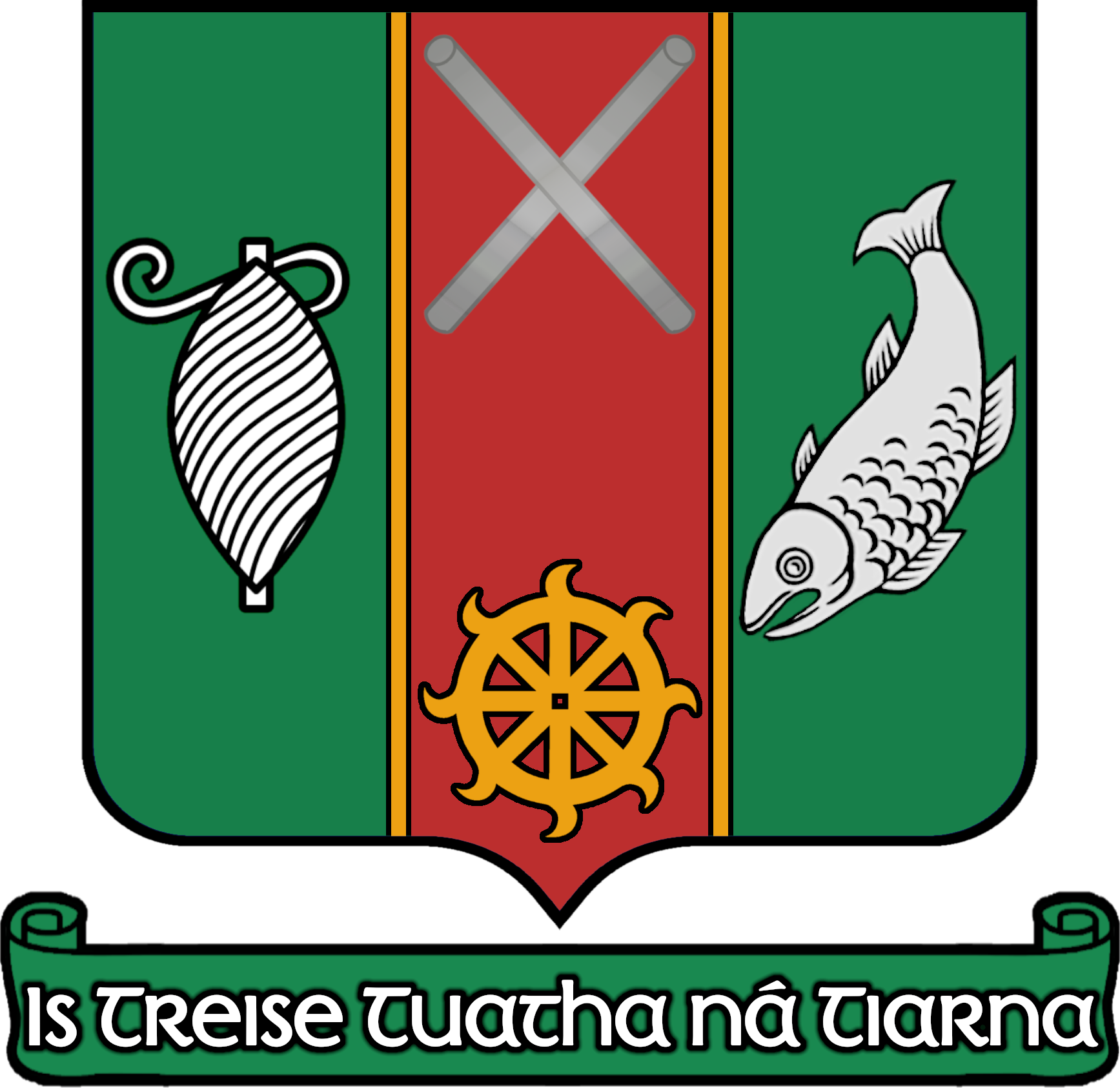
- Coat of arms
- Motto: Is Treise Tuatha ná Tiarna
- Location in Ireland, north County Dublin
- Coordinates: 53°36′31″N 06°10′59″W
- Country: Ireland
- Province: Leinster
- County: Fingal
- Dáil constituency: Dublin Fingal
- EU Parliament: Dublin
- Elevation: 6 m (20 ft)

Population (2022)
  - Total: 24,322
- Time zone: UTC±0 (WET)
  - Summer (DST): UTC+1 (IST)
- Eircode routing key: K32
- Telephone area code: +353(0)1
- Irish Grid Reference: O200641

Balbriggan (/bælˈbrɪɡən/; Irish: Baile Brigín, pronounced [ˌbˠalʲə ˈbʲɾʲɪɟiːnʲ]) is a coastal town in Fingal, in the northern part of County Dublin, Ireland. It is approximately 34 km north of the city of Dublin, for which it is a commuter town. The 2022 census population was 24,322 for Balbriggan, making it the 17th-largest urban area in Ireland. The town formerly had an active textile industry, and was the site of a major episode in the Irish War of Independence.

== Etymology ==
According to P. W. Joyce, the name arises from Baile Breacain [sic], which literally means "Brecan's Town". Brecan is a common medieval first name and there are several other Brackenstowns in Ireland. There is also a possible link to the local Bracken River, in which case the name could derive from breicín, meaning "little trout".

Many locals, however, have traditionally felt that Baile Brigín means "Town of the Little Hills", due to the relatively low hills that surround the town. Although this is now the official Irish name for the town, it is likely to be a folk etymology, back-formed from the English name. Following linguistic logic, however, both with vowels and syllabic stress, this would presume an English name closer to Ballybrig(g)een.

The town's name is more likely derived from the word brecan, as the area was part of a medieval kingdom known as Brega, populated by a tribe or clan known as the Bregii.

== History ==
There is no consensus about when the foundation of the town occurred, other than there may always have been a small settlement of fishermen, weavers and some sort of agricultural trade post.

=== Medieval battle ===
According to Ware, a medieval annalist, a battle took place at Balbriggan on Whitsun-eve, 1329, between the combined forces of John de Bermingham, Earl of Louth (who had been elevated to the 'palatine dignity' of the county) and Richard, Lord of Malahide, and several of their kinsmen, and the forces of local rival families, the Verduns, Gernons and Savages, who were opposed to the elevation of the earl.

=== 18th century ===
Balbriggan rose from a small fishing village to a place of manufacturing and commercial importance in part due to local landowner and judge George Hamilton, Baron of the Court of Exchequer, who, in 1780, established factories to aid in the manufacturing of cotton. He also improved the harbour by building the pier, which was completed in 1763.

=== 19th century ===
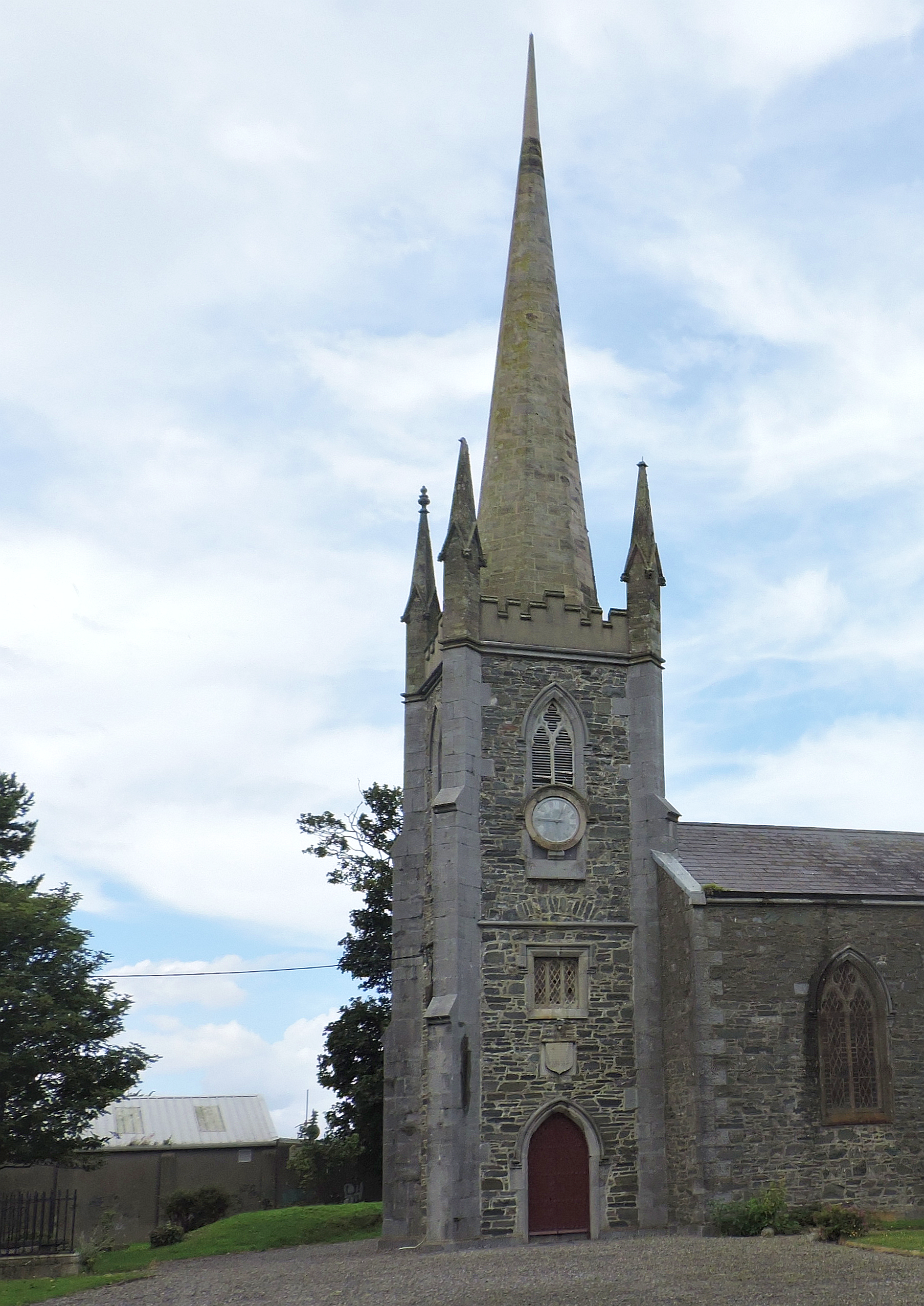
St. Georges Church tower, 1813

Lewis's Topographical Directory of Ireland, from 1837, refers to Balbriggan as follows:

A seaport, market and post village and a chapelry, in the parish and barony of Balrothery, county of Dublin, and province of Leinster, 15 miles (N. by E.) from Dublin; containing 3,016 inhabitants.

The inhabitants are partly employed in the fishery, but principally in the manufacture of cotton; there are two large factories, the machinery of which is worked by steam-engines and water-wheels of the aggregate power of 84 horses, giving motion to 7,500 spindles, and spinning upon the average about 7,400 lb (3,356.58 kg). of cotton yarn per week. More than 300 persons are employed in these factories, to which are attached blue dye-works; and in the village and neighbourhood are 942 hand-looms employed in the weaving department. The principal articles made at present are checks, jeans, calicoes and fustians. The village is also celebrated for the manufacture of the finest cotton stockings, which has been carried on successfully since its first establishment about 40 years since; there are 60 frames employed in this trade, and the average production is about 60 dozen per week. There are on the quay a large corn store belonging to Messrs. Frost & Co., of Chester, and some extensive salt-works; and in the village is a tanyard.

The fishery, since the withdrawing of the bounty, has very much diminished: there are at present only 10 wherries or small fishing boats belonging to the port. The village carries on a tolerably brisk coasting trade: in 1833, 134 coal vessels, of the aggregate burden of 11,566 tons, and 29 coasting vessels of 1,795 tons, entered inwards, and 17 coasters of 1,034 tons cleared outwards, from and to ports in Great Britain. The harbour is rendered safe for vessels of 150 tons' burden by an excellent pier, completed in 1763, principally by Baron Hamilton, aided by a parliamentary grant, and is a place of refuge for vessels of that burden at 3/4 tide. A jetty or pier, 420 feet (130 metres) long from the N. W. part of the harbour, with a curve of 105 feet (32 metres) in a western direction, forming an inner harbour in which at high tide is 14 feet (4.3 metres) of water, and affording complete shelter from all winds, was commenced in 1826 and completed in 1829, at an expense of £2,912–7s–9d, of which the late Fishery Board gave £1,569, the Marquess of Lansdowne £100, and the remainder was subscribed by the late Rev. Geo. Hamilton, proprietor of the village. At the end of the old pier, there is a lighthouse.

The Drogheda or Grand Northern Trunk railway from Dublin, for which an act has been obtained, is intended to pass along the shore close to the village and to the east of the church. The market is on Monday, and is abundantly supplied with corn, of which great quantities are sent to Dublin and to Liverpool; and there is a market for provisions on Saturday. Fairs are held on the 29th of April and September, chiefly for cattle. A market house was erected in 1811, partly by subscription and partly at the expense of the Hamilton family. The village is the headquarters of the constabulary police force of the county; and near it is a Martello tower with a coast guard station, which is one of the nine stations within the district of Swords. Petty sessions for the northeast division of the county are held here every alternate Tuesday.

The chapelry of St. George, Balbriggan was founded by the late Rev. G. Hamilton, of Hampton Hall, who in 1813 granted some land and settled an endowment, under the 11th and 12th of Geo. III., for the establishment of a perpetual curacy; and augmentation of £25 per annum has been recently granted by the Ecclesiastical Commissioners from Primate Boulter's fund. In 1816 a chapel was completed, at an expense of £3,018–2s–2d, of which £1,400 was given by the late Board of First Fruits, £478-15s–2d., was raised by voluntary subscriptions of the inhabitants and £1,139-7s–0d., was given by the founder and his family. This chapel, which was a handsome edifice with a square embattled tower, and contained monuments to the memory of R. Hamilton, Esq., and the Rev. G. Hamilton, was burned by accident in 1835, and the congregation assembled for divine service in a school-room until it shall be restored, for which purpose the Ecclesiastical Commissioners have lately granted £480. The living is in the patronage of G. A. Hamilton, Esq.

There is a chapel belonging to the R.C. Union or district of Balrothery and Balbriggan, also a place of worship for Wesleyan Methodists. A parochial school and dispensary are in the village.

The population at the time of the 1841 census was 2,959 inhabitants.

==== Milling ====
Balbriggan was the location of the 19th century Smith's Stocking Mill, which made stockings as well as men's "Long-Johns" called Balbriggans. These are often mentioned in John Wayne films – 'he put his balbriggans on' – and both Queen Victoria and the Czarina of Russia also wore "Balbriggans". Balbriggan's strong textile connections also include the linen & cotton manufacturing of Charles Gallen & Company, which in 1870, purchased the existing weaving mill and associated facilities built by Baron Hamilton. The firm became famous as the finest linen weavers in Ireland and had customers all over the world. They were also suppliers of linens to the Vatican, Embassies of Ireland and the US, and fine hotels worldwide.

=== Sack of Balbriggan ===
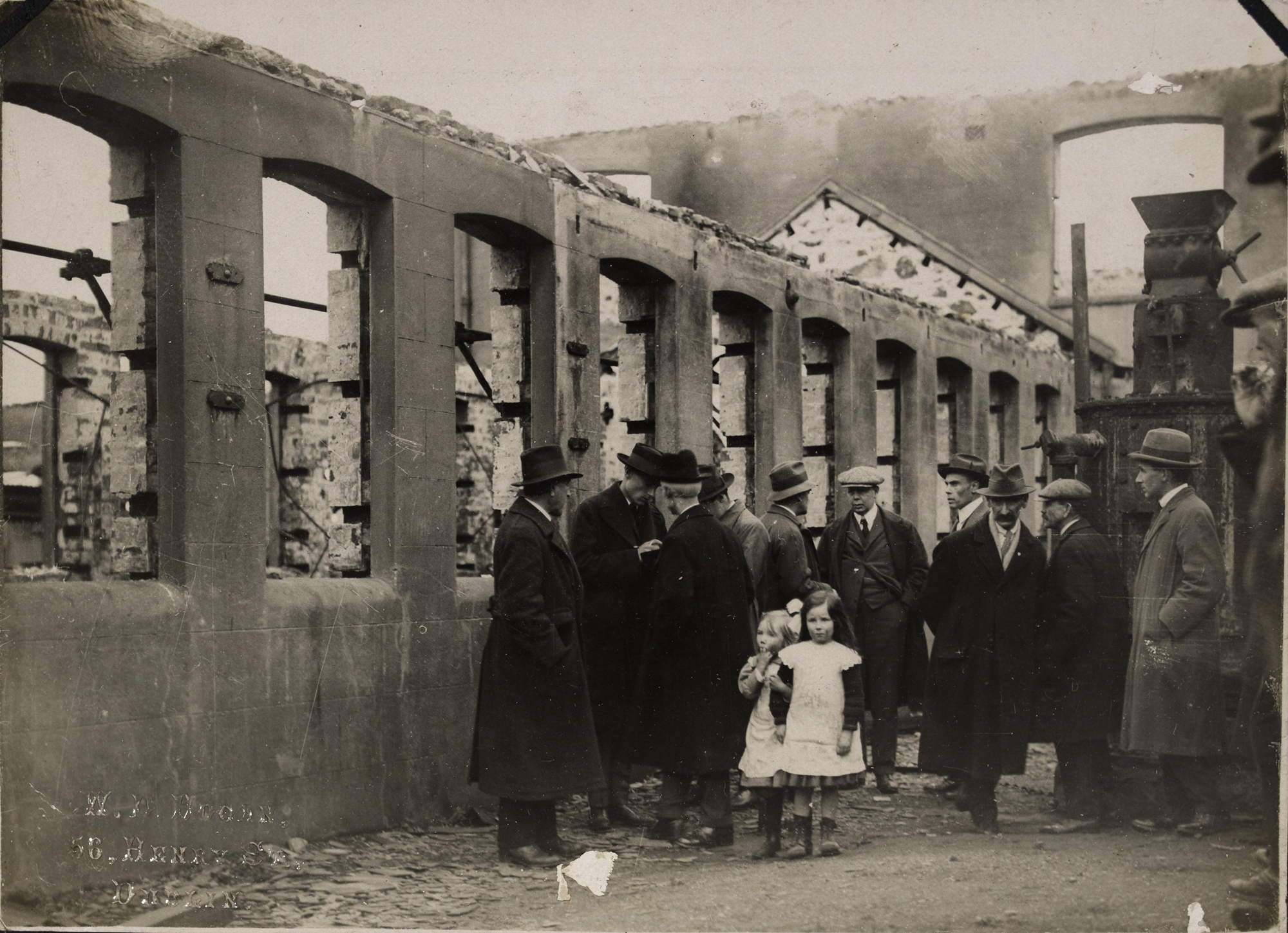
Burnt out building following the Sack of Balbriggan, September 1920

During the Irish War of Independence, members of the Black and Tans (former British soldiers recruited into the Royal Irish Constabulary (RIC) as special constables) stationed at the nearby Gormanston Camp attacked Balbriggan in reprisal for the murder of an RIC Deputy Inspector Peter Burke on 20 September 1920. The event, known as the sack of Balbriggan, resulted in the destruction of 54 houses and a hosiery factory along with the looting of four pubs by the Black and Tans. Two residents of Balbriggan, dairyman Séamus Lawless and barber Sean Gibbons, were bayoneted to death by the Black and Tans during the attack. After it occurred, the attack received negative international attention due to Balbriggan's close proximity to foreign news correspondents based in Dublin. Images of the burnt out town were published around the world causing international outrage. A delegation from the United States pledged to rebuild thirty homes in the village and a local factory.

== Location and access ==
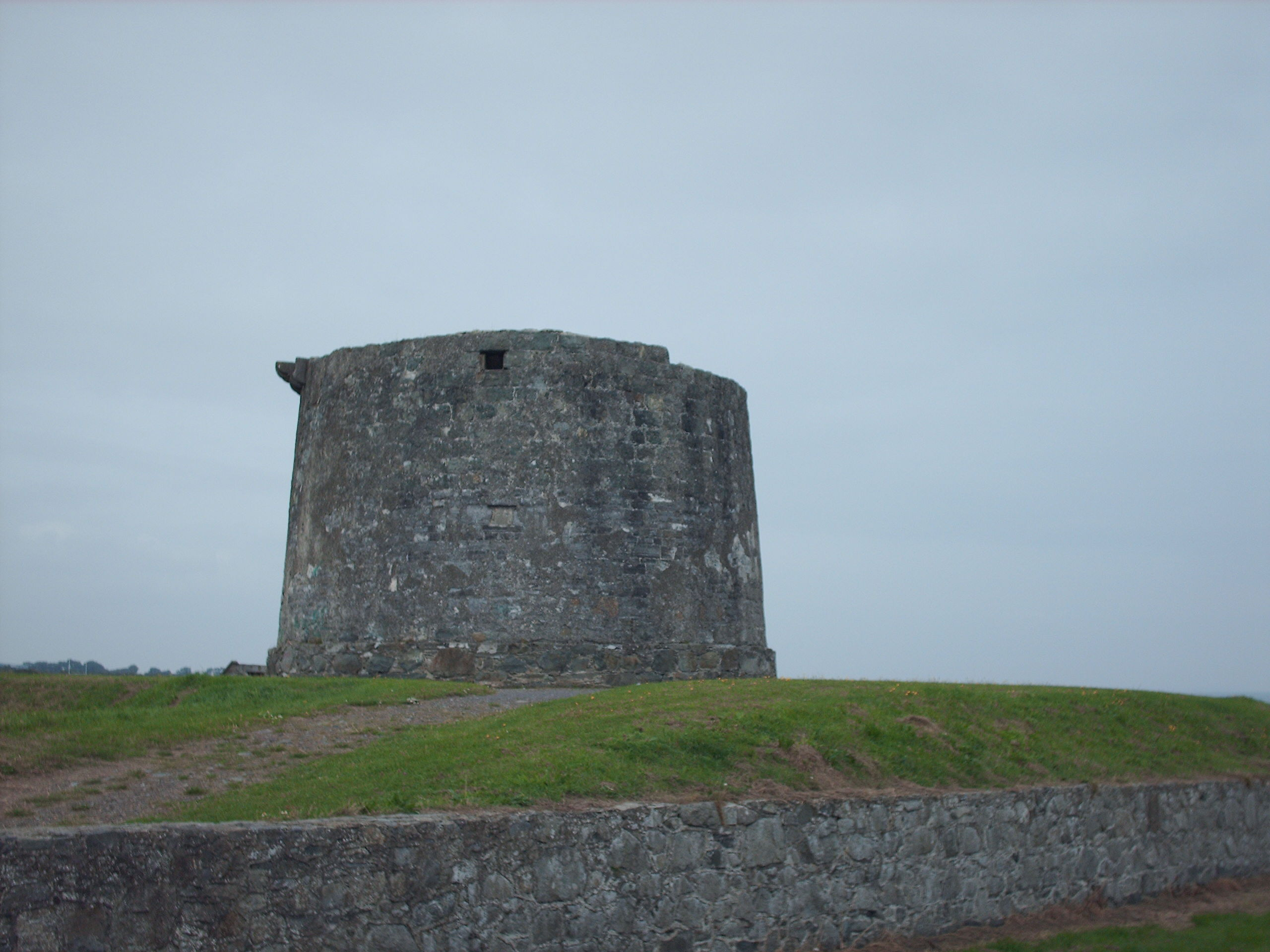
Martello tower at Balbriggan

Balbriggan is 32 km north of Dublin city, in the northern part of the traditional County Dublin. It lies on the Belfast–Dublin main line of the Irish rail network. Commuter rail services serve Balbriggan railway station, which opened on 25 May 1844 and closed for goods traffic on 2 December 1974. It is estimated that about 2,200 commuters use the station every working day.

The town is also located next to the M1 motorway (the section known as the Balbriggan Bypass), which was completed in 1998. Prior to this, the main Dublin-Belfast road went through the centre of the town, with major traffic congestion on a daily basis. There are three exits from the motorway, allowing you to enter from the North, South or West of the town.

Bus service is provided by Dublin Bus routes 33, 33A (taken over by Go-Ahead Ireland on 2 December 2018) and 33X as well as Bus Éireann routes 101 (Dublin-Drogheda) and B1 (Balbriggan Town service).

It is the most northerly town in Fingal (although the village of Balscadden lies further north within the county), and is situated close to Bettystown, Laytown (County Meath) and Drogheda (County Louth).

Balbriggan experienced a population boom in the early part of the 2000s as a result of the large demand for housing within the wider Dublin region. The population has increased as a result.

== Geography ==
The River Bracken, also known as the Matt River, which flows through the town, once formed a lake known locally as "the Canal" or "Head"(of water). The water was sluiced through a canal and tunnels down to the Lower Mill where it turned a waterwheel to drive the cotton manufacturing machinery. The retaining wall of the reservoir collapsed in the 1960s and the area was reclaimed with land-fill in the early 1980s to create a public park.

On the northern edge of the town, the small Bremore River comes to the sea just beyond the Martello Tower.

=== Population ===
Balbriggan
Year	Pop.	±%
1991	7,724	—
1996	8,473	+9.7%
2002	10,294	+21.5%
2006	15,559	+51.1%
2011	19,960	+28.3%
2016	21,722	+8.8%
2022	24,322	+12.0%

According to the 2016 census, the town was 63% White Irish and 0.8% Irish Traveller, 16.7% White of any other background, 11.0% Black, 2.8% Asian and 5.7% other racial background or not stated. Approximately 73% of the town's population was born in the Republic of Ireland, and 27% were born abroad. The Polish were by far the largest foreign-born group in 2016, accounting for 5.8% of the town's population (1,270 people).

In 2022, there were 24,322 people residing in Balbriggan, representing an 12.52% increase from the 2016 census. In 2022, according to the CSO, the town is 56.6% White Irish and 0.6% Irish Traveller, 19.2% White of any other background, 9.6% Black, 4.9% Asian, 3.6% any other racial background, and 5.2% not stated.

Balbriggan was also Ireland's "youngest town" in 2016, with an average age of 30.8 years. It held this title in 2022, with the average age raising to 33.6 years.

Ethnic composition of population (2016, 2022)
Ethnicity	2016 Population	2016 Percentage	2022 Population	2022 Percentage
White	17,395	80.5%	18,472	76.50%
Black	2,371	11.0%	2,321	9.6%
Asian	1,659	2.8%	1,205	4.9%
Other	524	2.6%	881	3.6%
Not stated	670	3.1%	1,266	5.2%

== Amenities ==
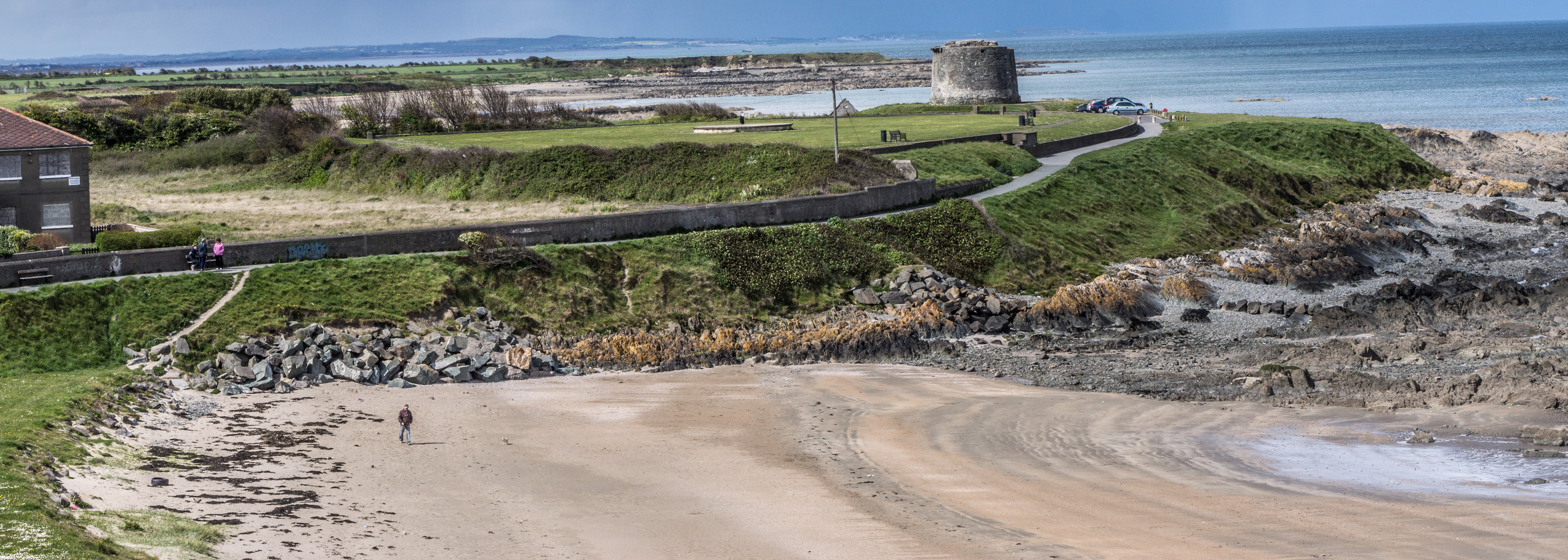
Balbriggan Beach with Martello tower in the background

The town is coastal and has a sandy beach. It was, at one time, a holiday destination for people from Dublin city.

Balbriggan is also the location of a Sunshine Home which aims to provide a holiday to underprivileged children from the Greater Dublin Area. The home is operated by the Sunshine Fund, a unique branch of the Society of Saint Vincent de Paul which provides week-long summer breaks for children aged 7 to 11 from disadvantaged parts of Dublin, Meath, Wicklow and Kildare. The purpose-built home has hosted these holidays since 1935.

== Economy ==
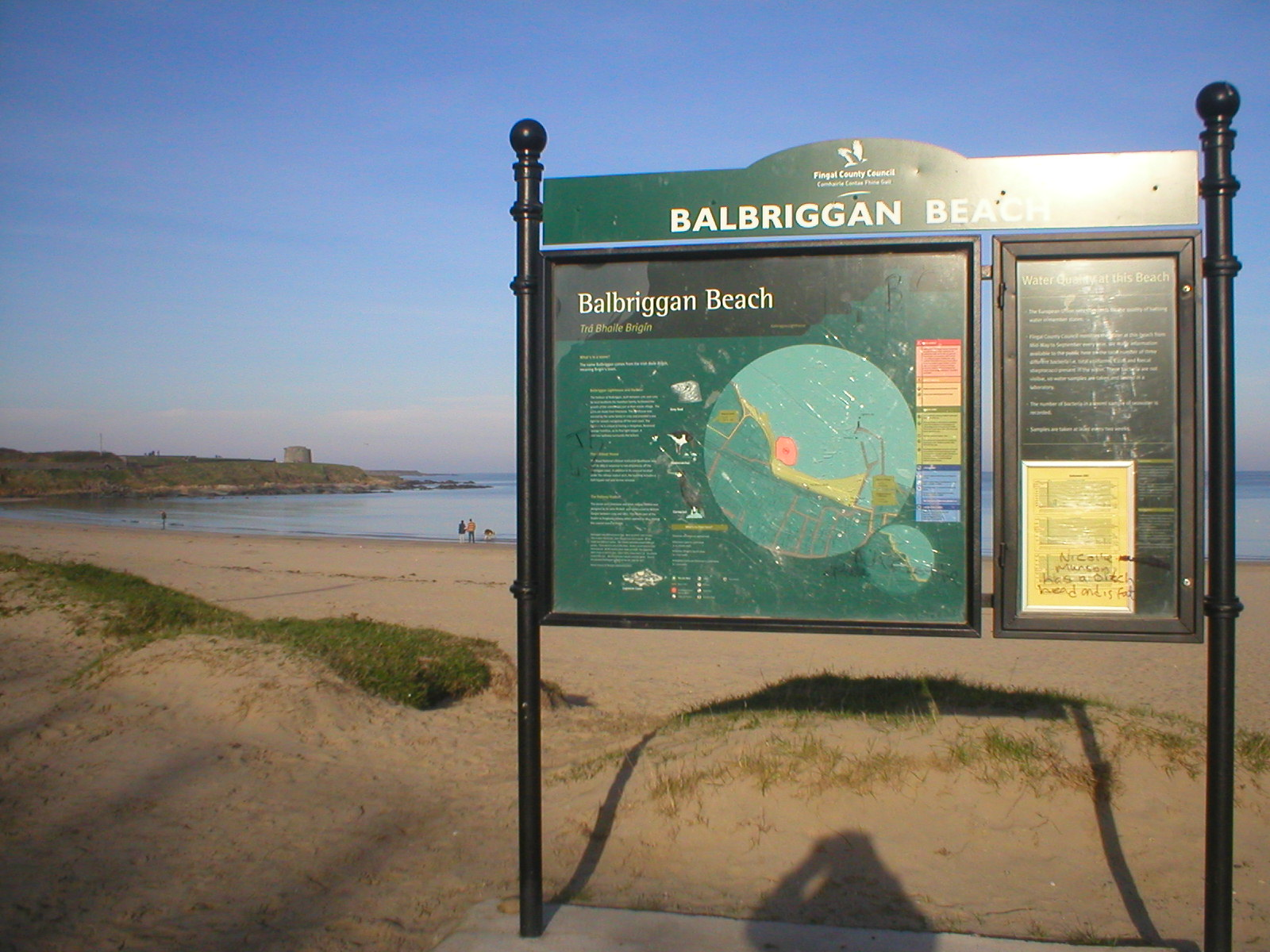
Balbriggan – beach

The Department of Foreign Affairs has located a passport production facility in Balbriggan. There is also a proposal to relocate the Drogheda International Seaport to the Bremore Port area to the north of the town. Local development bodies expect that the proposed Bremore Port and orbital motorway projects, as well as the existing M1 motorway and Belfast – Dublin railway, are major draws to prospective companies with large logistical sectors hoping to expand or set up in the Fingal area.

Wavin has been manufacturing plastic pipes in their purpose-built facility in Balbriggan since 1962.

The coworking community Fumbally Exchange established a offices on Railway Street in 2012 with the support of Balbriggan Enterprise Development Group. The office was formally launched by Minister for Health, James Reilly and was described by Ballbriggan Chamber of Commerce as "a vital step in the economic regeneration of the town".

=== Hosiery fabric ===
Balbriggan was a well-known hosiery cloth manufacturer. A fine cotton fabric suitable for men's underwear was named after the town. The town prospered as a result of the manufacture of the fabric.

== Local government ==
Balbriggan is a local electoral area of Fingal, electing five councillors to Fingal County Council. It contains the electoral divisions of Balbriggan Rural, Balbriggan Urban, Holmpatrick and Skerries.

Balbriggan had town commissioners under the Towns Improvement (Ireland) Act 1854. This became a town council in 2002. The jurisdictional area of the town was increased in 2009. In common with all town councils, it was abolished in 2014.

It was within the rural district of Balrothery, which was abolished in 1930.

The old Balbriggan Town Hall, which was opened in St. George's Square in 1936, was demolished and replaced by a new structure in 2005. It served as home to Balbriggan Town Council until the council's dissolution in 2014.

== Buildings of note ==
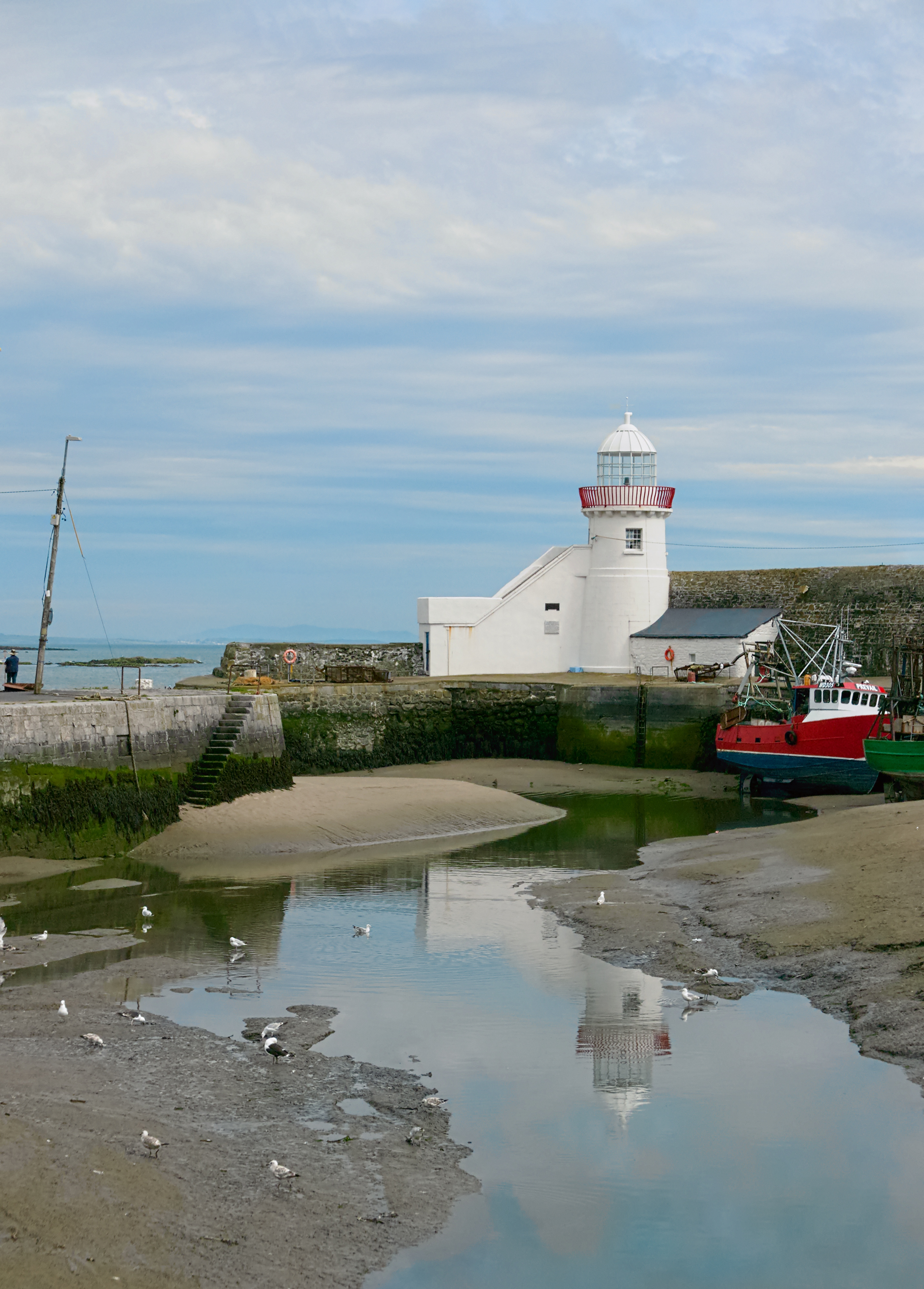
Balbriggan Lighthouse

- Balbriggan Market House is a 5-bay two-storey building dating from 1811.
- Balbriggan Carnegie Free Library, built c. 1905.
- National Irish Bank building, Drogheda Street, built c. 1885.
- Balbriggan Court House, built c. 1844.
- Balbriggan Railway Viaduct, built c. 1843.
- Loreto Convent, built c. 1905
- St. Peter and St. Paul's Church, built in 1842 (Gothic Revival style), Catholic Church.
- St. Georges Church (Balrothery), built in 1813 (Gothic Revival style), Church of Ireland.
- Lighthouse, built in 1761 and listed in the National Inventory of Architectural Heritage (NIAH) with reg. nr.11305017.
- Bremore Castle, built in 14th century and later deteriorated, it has been restored by the Parks Department of Fingal County Council and the Balbriggan and District Historical Society.
- Balbriggan also has a Martello Tower which was built by the British during the Napoleonic Wars. It is one of 29 Martello towers in the Greater Dublin Area.

== Education ==
=== Primary ===
Balbriggan has a number of primary schools, including several Roman Catholic and Church of Ireland national schools and an Irish-language medium gaelscoil.

=== Secondary ===
Ardgillan Community College was closed abruptly in October 2018 after adverse fire safety findings. Problems were identified, and are being found, as with other schools built by the same Dungannon-based company, Western Building Systems.

=== Adult education ===
Fingal Adult Education Service offers adult education courses both full and part-time.

== Sport ==
=== Athletics ===
Balbriggan and District AC is the local athletic club, with members starting at 6 years old in Little Athletes, and competing from 8 years old up to senior and masters level. The club is all-inclusive and has runners at every level.

=== Gaelic games ===
O'Dwyers GAA is the local Gaelic Athletic Association club which was founded in 1918. The club operates "skills camp"s for underage players (indoors) during winter. The club plays Gaelic football and hurling at several underage levels (girls, boys and mixed). There is also a juvenile camogie team. At the adult level, the club has one football team competing in AFL4. There are three adult male football teams that play in AFL4, AFL9, AFL11A.

=== Soccer ===
Balbriggan has a number of soccer clubs. These include Balbriggan FC (formerly known as Clonard Celtic and founded in 1982). This club amalgamated with another club in the area, Balscadden Blues, in the 1990s. Balbriggan FC now fields underage teams and three senior teams.

Glebe North FC was established in 1945. The club has two senior teams playing in the Leinster Senior League and 16 schoolboy/girl teams playing in the NDSL Leagues. The club's facilities are located at Market Green.

Hyde Park FC and Ringcommon Wanderers FC also represent the area. The latter was established in late 1999 and consists of a women's and a men's senior team which play at the Ring Commons Sports Centre.

Balrothery FC also uses the Ring Commons sports facilities, which include two soccer pitches, floodlit soccer training areas, an 18-hole pitch and putt course, and a rugby pitch. The clubhouse includes a meeting hall, as well as offices, a kitchen, changing rooms and toilets.

=== Rugby ===
Balbriggan Rugby Football Club was founded in 1925. They field men's and women's teams. The men's team play in the Leinster League, Div.2A and Leinster North East Area League (McGee Cup). The women's team play in Division 2. They also field several underage teams from U7s through to U18s as well as fielding girls' youth rugby teams and special needs rugby teams. The club started the 2007–08 season playing at the new club grounds outside of Balrothery, County Dublin next door to North County Cricket Club. The club plans further major development including new pitches and training areas. On Friday 14 November 2008 the 500 Lux Flood Lighting system was turned on for the first time on the main pitch, soon to be followed by the second pitch. The third full-size sand-based all-weather pitch was opened during the 2009–10 season. In 2020, the club opened the highly-anticipated clubhouse: the club's first permanent clubhouse since its establishment.

=== Other sports ===
Balbriggan Cricket Club's home ground is in the 'Town Park', beside the Catholic Church.

Balbriggan Golf Club is an 18-hole parkland golf course, about 30 km north of Dublin city, established in 1945, and redeveloped in 2007–2009.

== Religion ==
Balbriggan is a Roman Catholic parish in the Fingal North deanery of the Roman Catholic Archdiocese of Dublin. The parish church is the Church of Ss. Peter and Paul, with Mass available in English and Polish.

In the Church of Ireland structure, Balbriggan forms part of a combined parish with Balrothery and Balscadden. The parish church is on Church Street.

== References in literature ==
The village is mentioned in James Joyce's short story "The Dead". Gabriel Conroy, the main character/narrator, mentions his brother is a Catholic priest in Balbriggan.

The vampire Cassidy, one of the main characters in Garth Ennis's comic book series Preacher, was born in Balbriggan in 1900.

Jacek, the lead character in the novel Pantha rhei by Kamil Brach, discovers that his biography has changed after travelling back from the future. While searching for his "new" past he discovers accidentally that his alter ego from his reality lived with his fiancée in Balbriggan, and his disappearance didn't go unnoticed. While on the train, near the train station, Jacek sees a poster with his face on and he goes into the city. Looking for information he passes Mill Street. Eventually, he is recognised by a waitress in Molly's Café.

== Notable people ==
- Diane Caldwell, footballer for the Republic of Ireland national team
- Sinéad de Valera (1878–1975), author and wife of former Taoiseach and President Éamon de Valera
- Jordan Doherty, Irish footballer for Tampa Bay Rowdies
- George Hamilton (1732–1793), politician, judge and local landowner, owner of Hampton Hall, who did much to improve the town and harbour of Balbriggan
- George Alexander Hamilton (1802–1871), MP, civil servant and local landowner, grandson of George Hamilton and like him a noted benefactor of the town
- Harry Reynolds (1874–1940), first Irishman to win the world championship in cycling in 1896. In 2005 Harry Reynolds Road in Balbriggan was named in his honour.
- Lesley Roy (born 1986), singer/songwriter who represented Ireland at the 2020 and 2021 Eurovision Song Contest
- Trevor Sargent (born 1960), former leader of the Green Party and Minister of State at the Department of Agriculture, Food and the Marine
- Gertie Shields (1930–2015), founder of "Mothers against Drink Driving" and member of the town council

== Twinning ==
Balbriggan is twinned with the following places:

- Belmar, United States
- Sankt Wendel, Germany

== See also ==
- List of towns and villages in Ireland
- Market Houses in Ireland
