= John Beattie West =

Irish politician and barrister

Member of Parliament for Dublin City
- In office 10 July 1841 – 27 December 1841 Serving with Edward Grogan
- Preceded by: Daniel O'Connell; Robert Hutton
- Succeeded by: Edward Grogan; William Henry Gregory
- In office 16 May 1836 – 31 July 1837 Serving with George Alexander Hamilton
- Preceded by: Daniel O'Connell; Edward Southwell Ruthven
- Succeeded by: Daniel O'Connell; Robert Hutton

Personal details
- Born: 1790
- Died: 27 December 1841 (aged 50–51) Dublin
- Party: Conservative
- Spouse: Elizabeth Felicia Burton
- Children: Anna Felicia 1822, Charlotte Beatty 1824, Maria Alphonsine, Charles Burton 1826, Francis Jane 1828, Elizabeth Burton, Francis Edmund

John Beattie West (1790 – 27 December 1841) was an Irish Conservative politician and barrister.

West was first elected Conservative MP for Dublin City in 1836 after the result of the 1835 general election was overturned on petition. He held the seat until the next year, when he was defeated at that year's general election. He regained the seat in 1841, but died later that year.

He married in 1819 Elizabeth Felicia Burton, only daughter of Mr Justice Charles Burton and Anna Andrews, with whom he had seven children:

  - Anna Felicia (b. 1822), who married Sir Croker Barrington, 4th Baronet in 1845.
  - Charlotte Beatty (b. 1824), who married Sir Henry Vansittart Stonhouse, 15th Baronet in 1851.
  - Maria Alphonsine, who married her cousin (on her mother's side), the Australian judge and statesman Sir William Westbrooke Burton in 1846 or 1847,
  - Charles Burton (b. 1826).
  - Francis Jane (b. 1828).
  - Elizabeth Burton.
  - Francis Edmund (b. 1836), who married Jane Caroline Adams of St. Stephen's Green in 1867 and was a Colonel in the Madras Staff Corps.

Parliament of the United Kingdom
Preceded by Daniel O'Connell; Edward Southwell Ruthven	Member of Parliament for Dublin City; 1836–1837; With: George Alexander Hamilton	Succeeded by Daniel O'Connell; Robert Hutton
Preceded by Daniel O'Connell; Robert Hutton	Member of Parliament for Dublin City; 1841–1842; With: Edward Grogan	Succeeded by Edward Grogan; William Henry Gregory
