= Jersey (fabric) =

Plain knit fabric

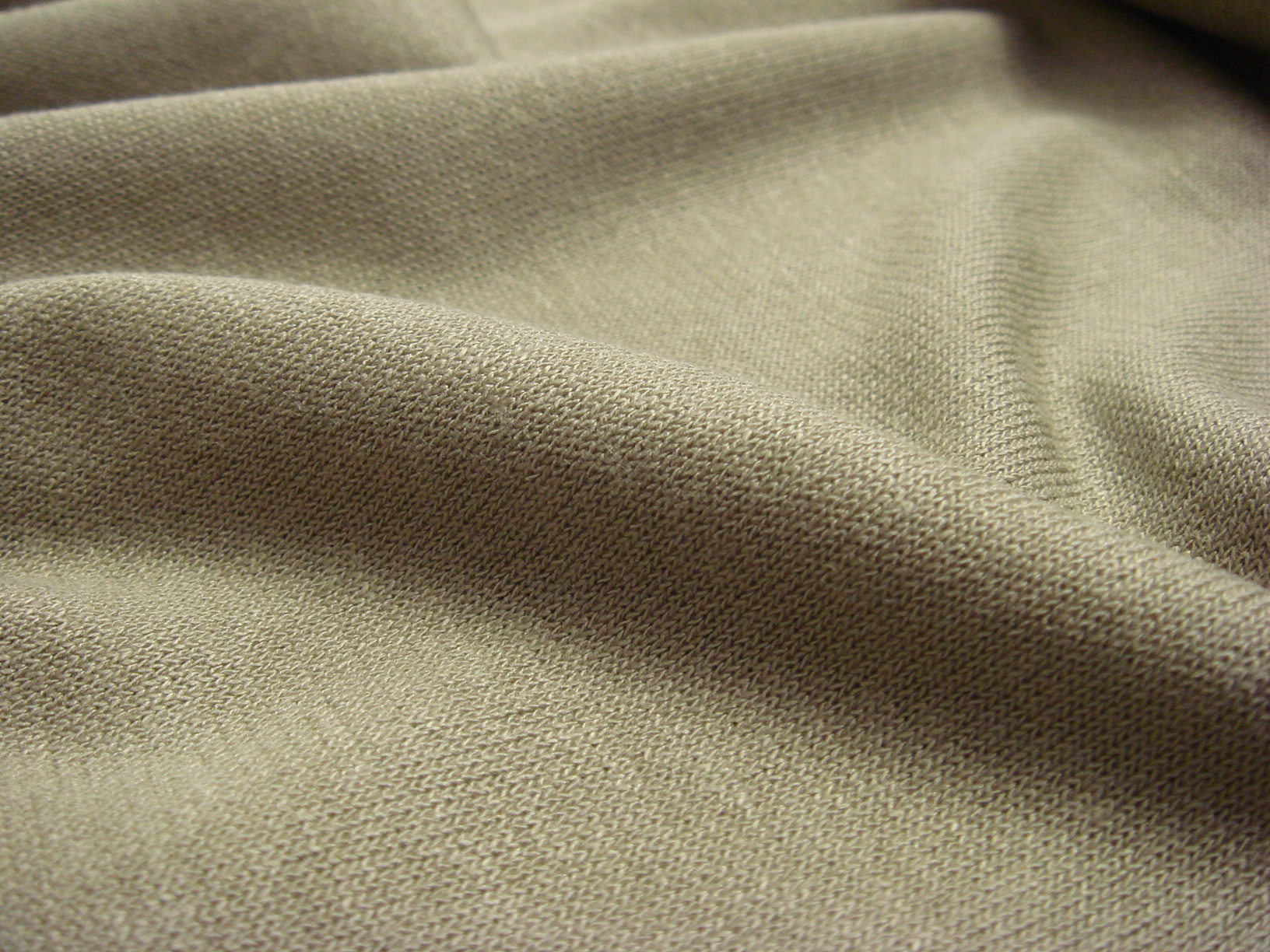
- Interlock jersey fabric
- Type: Fabric
- Material: Wool, cotton or synthetic fibers
- Production method: Knitting
- Production process: Mechanized
- Place of origin: Jersey

Jersey is a knit fabric used predominantly for clothing manufacture. It was originally made of wool, but is now made of wool, cotton and synthetic fibers.

== Origins ==
Jersey fabric originated in the Channel Islands, particularly on the island of Jersey, where it was traditionally used for underwear and sweaters for fishermen. This versatile fabric has historical roots dating back to the Middle Ages, when Jersey was a significant exporter of knitted goods. The name "Jersey" likely has roots in English and Old Norse, meaning "island," which reflects its geographic and historical origins.

Jersey fabric was originally made from wool, but it has since evolved to include cotton and synthetic blends, with common ratios being 50/50 or 60/40. These blends affect the fabric's durability and comfort, making it widely used in clothing items such as T-shirts and underwear. Today, jersey fabric is prized for its lightweight and stretchy qualities and is often made from materials like rayon or viscose, which provide a soft texture and excellent drape. Many modern versions of jersey fabric incorporate Lycra, spandex, or elastane to enhance stretchability.

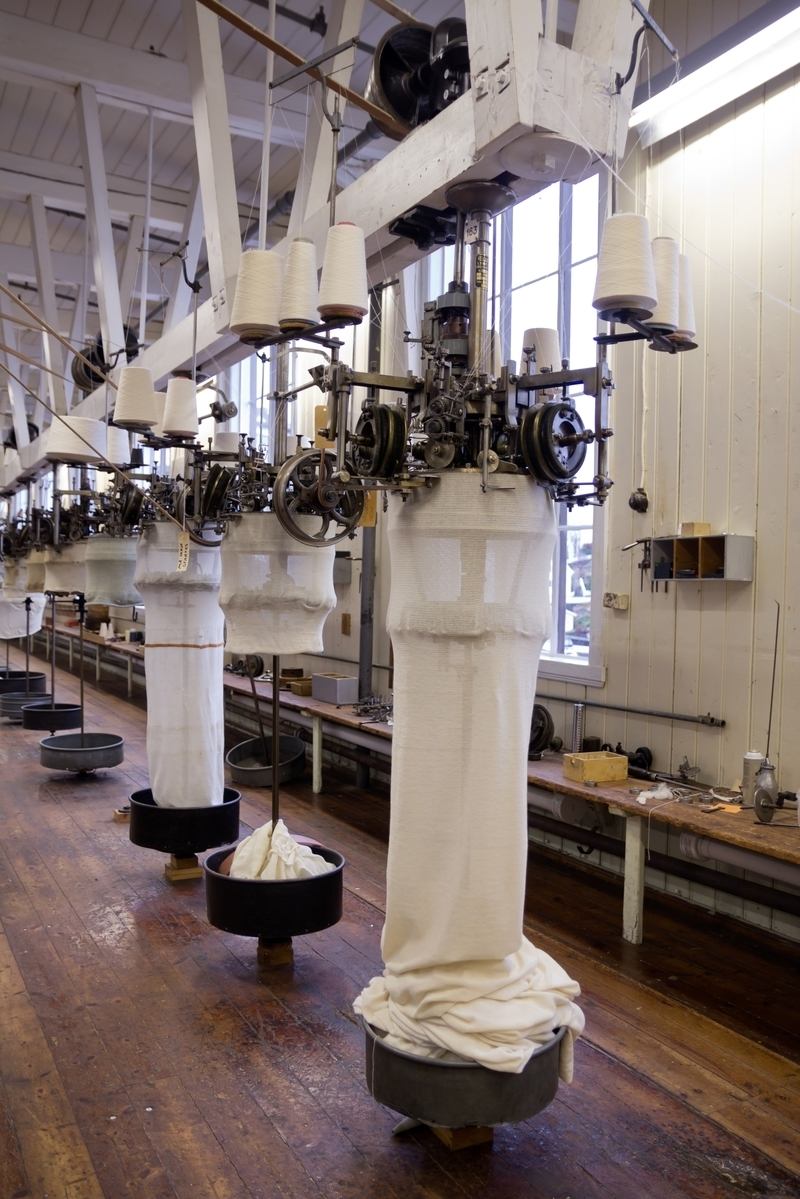
Historical jersey production

== Production ==
Jersey is a knitting method that produces a unique and versatile material. This knitting technique involves creating a lightweight and stretchy fabric by interlocking yarns in a series of loops. The result is jersey fabric, which is particularly well-suited for a variety of comfortable garments, such as T-shirts, dresses, and sportswear.

== Knitting techniques ==
Jersey fabric is a versatile material created through a specific knitting technique, commonly used for various garments. The fabric can be a stretchy single-knit jersey, usually lightweight, with one flat side and one piled side, making it ideal for comfortable clothing like T-shirts. When made as a double-knit (or interlock jersey), jersey fabric has less stretch and is heavier, with two layers of single jerseys knit together to create a fabric with flat sides on the exterior and piles in the center. This type of knit is often used for polo shirts, especially those made from pima cotton, and is considered an elegant alternative to piqué.

Jersey fabrics can be classified as follows:

- Single jersey: Lightweight, stretchy fabric with one flat side and one piled side, often used for T-shirts.
- Double jersey: Heavier, less stretchy fabric with two flat sides.
- Interlock jersey: Double-knit fabric that is thicker and can serve as a formal alternative for polo shirts.
- Jacquard jersey: Jersey fabric featuring complex patterns created during the knitting process.
- Clocqué jersey: Textured, with a blistered or quilted appearance.
- Stretch jersey: Jersey blended with elastane or spandex for enhanced stretch, commonly used in activewear and form-fitting garments.

=== Single jersey ===
Single jersey fabric is weft knit fabric produced by circular knitting machines. It is made from a single set of needles, creating a fabric with loops on one side and a series of interlocking "V" shapes on the other. The basic knit fabric are produced with flat and piled sides. It consists of a single sheet of knit fabric.The fabric has a GSM range between 120 and 220 GSM. It is ideal for lightweight garments. It has a curling tendency. The stretchability of the single jersey is moderate because of the knitting structure. There is the softness of the fabric that offers comfort against the skin. Besides, the fabric allows air circulation making it perfect for warm weather. Single fabric is an ideal material for clothing, t-shirts, baby clothing, casual wear, and yoga clothing.

There are two sides of single jersey fabrics. They are: the face side and the backside. This structure gives the fabric its signature stretch and flexibility. The appearance of both sides of the fabric is different. As a fabric, a single jersey is unbalanced. The thickness and weight are half of the rib fabric. This fabric is made of cotton, polyester, and blends. The structure of the single jersey is a single layer that causes curling. Single jersey has moderate stretch. Lycra-enhanced single jersey offers better flexibility.

=== Double jersey ===
Double jersey is a knit fabric produced with a double-bed circular knitting machine. It has loops on both sides. Therefore it is thicker and more stable than a single jersey. It is also known as double fabric. It is considered easier to sew with as it does not roll into itself as much as compared to a single jersey. The fabric is used for a variety of clothing due to its reversibility and double-sided construction. The fabric is used for a variety of purposes.

Double Jersey fabric is an interlocked design fabric. It is easy to work with as the material is heavy. The fabric is stretchy quality. The double jersey fabric is an interlocked jersey featuring two sheets of jersey fabric attached to the piled sides. The fabric has resulted in its smooth and flat sides. The fabric is insulative and durable.

Double jersey fabric has its uses in heavy-wear dresses. Some wearing heavy dresses are jackets, high-end T-shirts, layette items, and hoodies. The fabric is used for clothing, gym clothing, and yoga wear. The objective is the moisture-wicking capabilities. Choosing the synthetic double knit allows the stretching and air permeability. These two features make the fabric comfortable to wear during the movement. In the cold weather, double jerseys offer comfort and warmth. It is soft to the touch and heavy. During cold weather conditions, the fabric is used for jackets, thermal underwear, tops, and other general clothing.

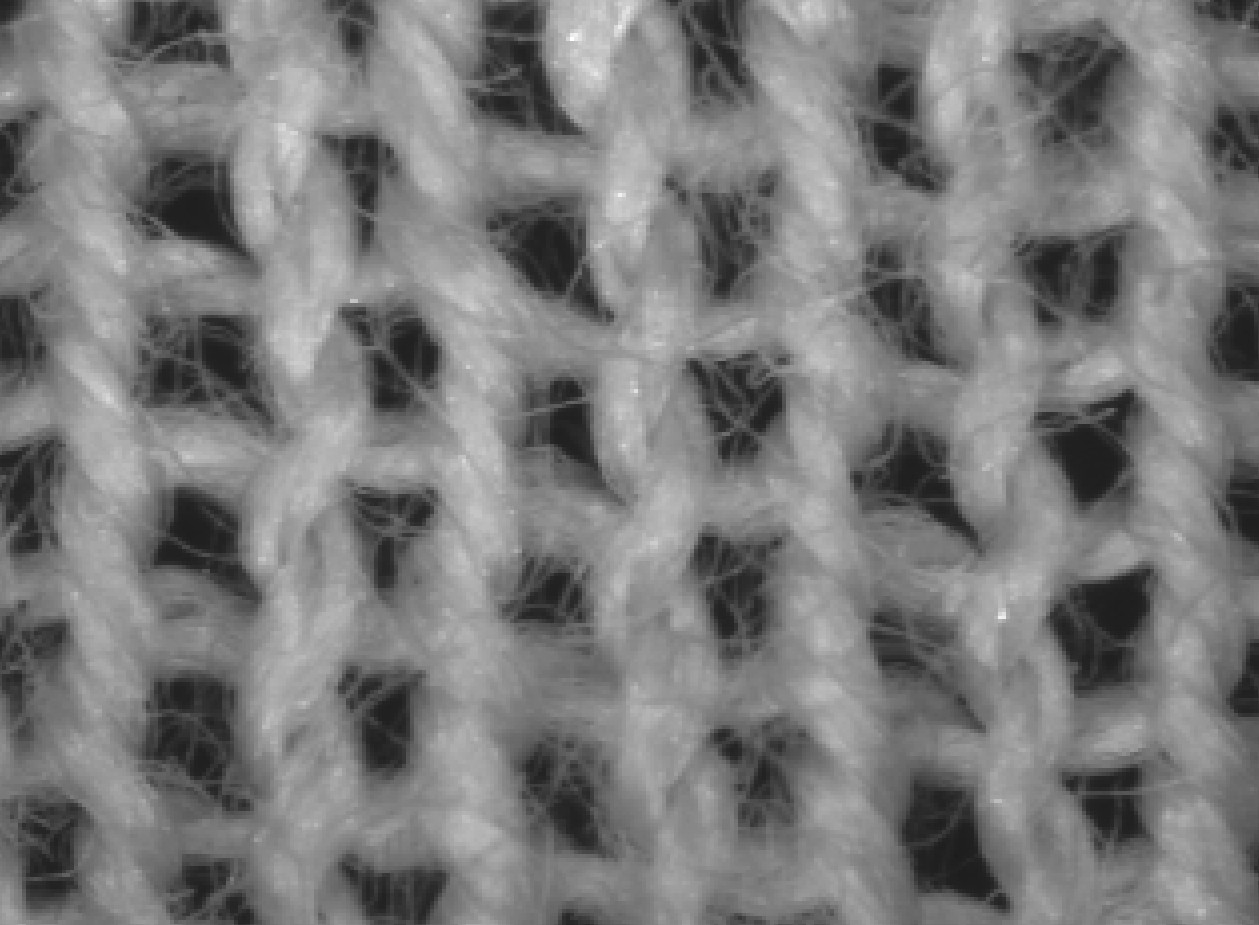
Single jersey front side under microscope

== Structure ==
Jersey is a weft knit fabric that is knitted on a single set of needles with all loops meshing in the same direction. By and large, it is knitted in plain stitch. It is also called plain. On the other hand, the double jersey is knit using two sets of needles, does not curl at the edges (when cut) and has a more stable structure. Although it is an ideal base layer material, jersey fabric lacks the insulation and durability of some other textiles.

== See also ==
- Balbriggan (cloth)
- Kersey (cloth)
