= West Stafford =

Village and civil parish in Dorset, England

Coordinates: 50°42′18″N 2°23′21″W

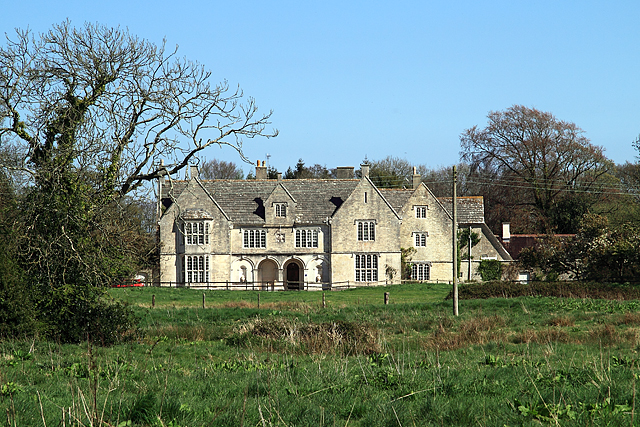
- Stafford House, West Stafford

- Location within Dorset
- Population: 291
- OS grid reference: SY726895
- Unitary authority: Dorset
- Ceremonial county: Dorset
- Region: South West
- Country: England
- Sovereign state: United Kingdom
- Post town: DORCHESTER
- Postcode district: DT2
- Police: Dorset
- Fire: Dorset and Wiltshire
- Ambulance: South Western
- UK Parliament: West Dorset

West Stafford is a village and civil parish in southwest Dorset, England, situated in the Frome valley 2 miles (3.2 km) east of Dorchester. In the 2011 census the parish had a population of 291. The village contains the public house 'The Wise Man Inn', and St Andrew's Church. The river Winterbourne runs beside the village and 2 miles south lies the village of West Knighton. Thomas Hardy, when training as an architect, assisted in the design of Talbothays Lodge and the cottages opposite. The village is also accepted as the setting for part of Hardy's novel Tess or the D'Urbevilles, during the period when Tess works at the Talbothays Dairy.

Reginald Bosworth Smith, schoolmaster, author and President of the Oxford Union, was born in West Stafford on 28 June 1839. His father, Reginald Southwell Smith, was the fourth son of Sir John Wyldbore Smith, Baronet, of Sydling St Nicholas, Dorset.

== See also ==
- Baron Fellowes of West Stafford
