= Bremore Port =

Coordinates: 53°37′48″N 6°11′25″W

Bremore Port is a proposed new deepwater Irish Sea port at Bremore, near Balbriggan, Ireland. It is being developed to provide an east coast deepwater port for Ireland to supplement the Drogheda and Dublin Ports.

Due to funding shortfalls, a 2007 - 2011 plan for development was replaced by a plan for logistics and offshore jetties at Gormanston just over the border in Meath.

It is located near the main M1 Dublin-Belfast road and rail links. The project is applying for Strategic infrastructure status (SIB).
