= Ralph Wood Thompson =

British civil servant

Sir Ralph Wood Thompson, KCB, PC (1 July 1830 – 1 December 1902) was a British civil servant.

Thompson was the son of Jonathan Thompson of Sherwood Hall, Nottinghamshire, receiver-general of Crown rents for the northern counties, by his wife Anne, daughter of Ralph Smyth, colonel in the Royal Artillery. A brother, Captain Henry Langhorne Thompson, gained fame for his part in the defence of Kars.

Thompson joined the Colonial Office as a clerk in 1853. He became Registrar in the War Office in 1854, Chief Clerk in War Office in 1871, Assistant Under-Secretary of State for War, 1877, and Permanent Under-Secretary of State for War in 1878. He retired in 1895.

He was appointed a Commissioner for the Patriotic Fund in 1881.

Thompson was appointed a Companion of the Order of the Bath (CB) in 1877, promoted to a Knight Commander (KCB) in 1882, and was appointed to the Privy Council in Lord Rosebery's resignation honours list in 1895.

Thompson married in 1856 Agatha Vaughan Cornish, daughter of Rev. George Cornish, rector of Kenwyn, Cornwall. She died in 1861. The colonial administrator Sir Harry Langhorne Thompson was their son.

He died in London on 1 December 1902.
