= George Hamilton (Irish judge) =

Irish politician, barrister and judge (1732–1793)

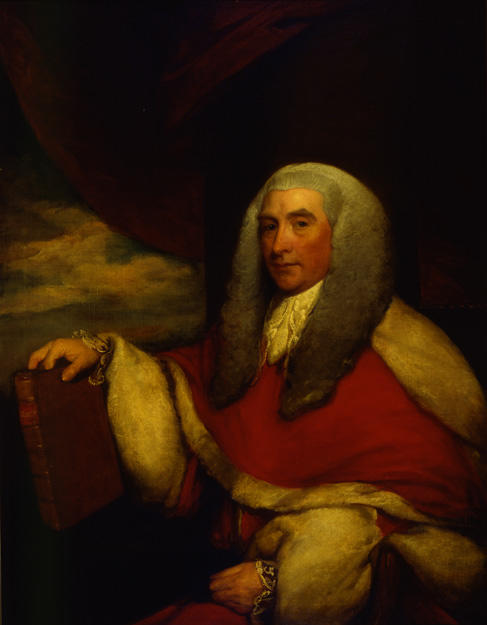
- Portrait by Gilbert Stuart

Member of the Irish Parliament for Belfast
- In office 1768–1776

Third Serjeant-at-law
- In office 1774–1776

Baron of the Court of Exchequer
- In office 1776–1793

Personal details
- Born: 1732 Knock, County Dublin, Ireland
- Died: 1793 (aged 60–61) Oswestry, England
- Spouse: Elizabeth Hamilton
- Parents: Alexander Hamilton; Isabella Maxwell
- Education: Trinity College Dublin

George Hamilton (1732–1793) was an Irish politician, barrister and judge. He sat in the Irish House of Commons as MP for Belfast, and held office as Third Serjeant-at-law and later as a Baron of the Court of Exchequer (Ireland). Today he is chiefly remembered for developing the town of Balbriggan, County Dublin.

He was born in Knock, near Balrothery, County Dublin, the third son of Alexander Hamilton (died 1768), solicitor and MP for Killyleagh, and Isabella Maxwell, daughter of Robert Maxwell of Finnebroge, County Down. Hugh Hamilton, Bishop of Ossory, was his elder brother. The Hamiltons had emigrated from Scotland in the early seventeenth century, and were mainly associated with County Down.

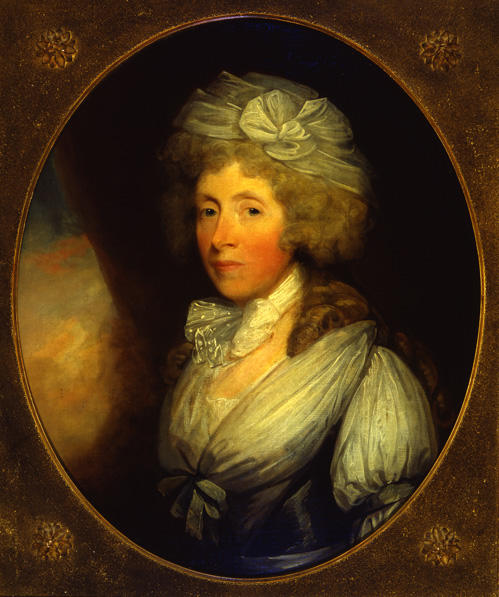
Elizabeth Hamilton, portrait by Gilbert Stuart

He went to school in Belfast, and matriculated from Trinity College Dublin in 1749. He entered the Middle Temple in 1750, was called to the Irish Bar in 1756 and became King's Counsel in 1767.

He was MP for Belfast from 1768 to 1776, and served as Third Serjeant-at-law (Ireland) from 1774 to 1776. He was accused by his political opponents of taking bribes to vote for the Government, but such charges were a normal part of the cut and thrust of eighteenth-century Irish politics and are not credible evidence of corruption. He became a Baron of the Court of Exchequer in 1776. As a judge, he was described as sitting silently between his quarrelsome colleagues. He died at Oswestry in 1793.

Although he had a Dublin townhouse, he lived mainly at Hampton Hall, Balbriggan. Apart from his legal and political career, his main interest in life was in developing the town of Balbriggan. He opened factories there, began a cotton manufacturing industry, and encouraged the breeding of horses. He also did much to improve Balbriggan harbour: his proudest achievement was the building of the pier, which was completed in 1763. Reportedly he became something of a bore on the subject: it was said facetiously that only some great preoccupation could cause him to go for more than fifteen minutes without mentioning Balbriggan pier. The tradition of civic improvement in Balbriggan was continued by his son and grandson.

He married his cousin Elizabeth Hamilton, daughter of another George Hamilton of the County Tyrone branch of the family and his wife Elizabeth Echlin, and had two sons, George and Alexander. George, the eldest son and heir, entered the Church, became Rector of Tyrella, County Down, and was the father of George Alexander Hamilton, who like his grandfather was an MP, and later Permanent Secretary to the Treasury. Alexander served briefly as his father's replacement as MP for Belfast, but died prematurely in 1808.

== Sources ==
- Ball, F. Elrington. The Judges in Ireland 1221-1921. vol. 2. London: John Murray, 1926
- Boase, George Clement "George Alexander Hamilton" Dictionary of National Biography 1885-1900 Vol. 24
- Hart, A. R. History of the King's Serjeant-at-law in Ireland. Four Courts Press Dublin, 2000
