= Reginald Bosworth Smith =

Reginald Bosworth Smith M.A.
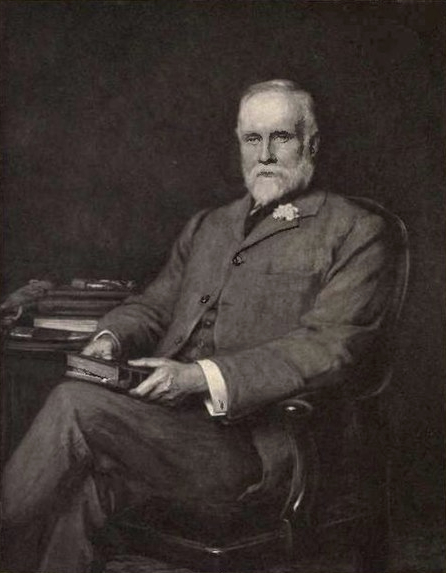
- Portrait of Bosworth Smith, photography by John Pouncy of Dorchester
- Born: 1839
- Died: 1908 (aged 68–69)
- Occupations: schoolmaster, author

Reginald Bosworth Smith (1839–1908) was an English academic, schoolmaster, man of letters and author.

== Background and early life ==
Born on 28 June 1839 at West Stafford rectory, Dorset, he was the second son in the large family of Reginald Southwell Smith (1809–1896); his mother was Emily Genevieve Simpson, daughter of Henry Hanson Simpson of Bitterne Manor House, Hampshire, and 12 Camden Place, Bath. His was an invalid suffering from tuberculosis. Bosworth Smith was brought up mostly by his mother, in a rectory family of 12 children, most of whom were infected by tuberculosis with some dying young.

From Milton Abbas school, near Blandford, Bosworth Smith went on in August 1855 to Marlborough College, where he was head boy under successive headmasters—George Edward Lynch Cotton, and George Granville Bradley.

== Oxford and Harrow ==
At Michaelmas 1858 Bosworth Smith matriculated with an open classical scholarship at Corpus Christi College, Oxford, and he graduated B.A. in 1862 with first-class honours both in classical moderations and in the final classical school. In the same year he was president of the Oxford Union. In 1863 he was elected to a classical fellowship at Trinity College, Oxford, and he was appointed tutor of the college, and lecturer both there and at Corpus Christi. He proceeded M.A. in 1865.

On 16 September 1864 Bosworth Smith began work as a classical master at Harrow School, on the nomination of the headmaster Henry Montagu Butler. He married the following year, and from 1870 he was housemaster of The Knoll, which he built at his own expense, and where he designed the garden. For more than 30 years Bosworth Smith mainly devoted his time to his duties at Harrow. In his form teaching, he leavened the classical tradition with history, scripture, geography, and English literature, especially John Milton. Not being in holy orders, he at that period was not considered eligible to become Harrow's headmaster.

The writer Thomas Hardy was born near West Stafford, at Higher Bockhampton in the parish of Stinsford. During the mid-1870s he became established as a family friend with the Smiths: he knew Bosworth Smith's father as "Canon Smith", and his mother, whose urbanity impressed him, as Geneviève. Bosworth Smith himself became a personal friend. This was despite a socially awkward moment at dinner in the rectory in 1874: the Smiths were entertaining with the help of James Pole, John Floyer's butler. Hardy and Cassie Pole, James Pole's daughter, had been walking out some years earlier, before breaking up, and the butler was unwilling to serve Hardy.

== Later life and death ==
Bosworth Smith travelled frequently in his vacations. In 1895 he purchased an old manor house at Bingham's Melcombe, Dorset, and there he resided on his retirement from Harrow in 1901. He was J.P. for Dorsetshire, a member of the education committee of the county council, vice-president of the Dorset Field Club, to which he lectured more than once, a member of the Salisbury Diocesan Synod, and a member of the house of laymen in the representative church council at Westminster. After a long illness he died at Bingham's Melcombe on 18 October 1908, and was buried beside his parents and brothers in the churchyard of West Stafford.

A portrait of Bosworth Smith was painted by Hugh Goldwin Rivière, presented by old pupils at Harrow and engraved by the Fine Arts Society. He was commemorated by tablets in Harrow school chapel and in the church at Bingham's Melcombe, and in his memory were erected a portion of the reredos in the church at West Stafford and (by friends and pupils) a stone balustrade in the terrace gardens at Harrow.

== Works ==
Bosworth Smith is now mainly remembered for Mohammed and Mohammedanism: Lectures Delivered at the Royal Institution of Great Britain in February and March 1874 (1874). The book excited controversy, and ran to several editions. It was translated into Arabic.

Smith's views on Christianity and Islam drew on Heinrich Barth, Theodor Waitz and John Pope Hennessy. They can be placed in a "conciliatory" tradition represented by the Mahometanism Unveiled (1829) of Charles Forster (1787–1871), and The Religions of the World (1846) of F. D. Maurice. They were later supported by Edward Wilmot Blyden, a Liberian Christian missionary who argued that Islam had brought clear advantages to Africans. Blyden and Bosworth Smith met, through Arthur Penrhyn Stanley, became friends, exchanged visits, and corresponded at length. Smith's deprecation of Christian missionary efforts in Africa was already in Winwood Reade's Savage Africa. The contrasting adversarial stance against Islam, of William Muir's Life of Mahomet and The Coran, and followed by John Drew Bate and William St. Clair Tisdall, drew on oriental studies and established missionary views on conversion as an imperative.

Bosworth Smith's conciliatory approach also had the support of Sayyid Ahmad Khan. The work of W. Montgomery Watt in the 20th century has been compared to Smith's.

In a controversy arising towards the end of 1887, Isaac Taylor went further in attacking existing Christian missionary activity, and in particular its commercial links. Smith allied himself with the Church Missionary Society, rebutting Taylor's propositions, and raising the question of plagiarism, since they were not novel. He found himself in rough consensus with Thomas Patrick Hughes, Harry Johnston, Joseph Thomson: on the positive contributions in Africa of Islam, and negative points; and on the value and prospects of Christian missionary work. This debate was concurrent with one on an atrocity in Bosnia-Herzegovina reported by Henry Liddon and Malcolm MacColl from a steamer journey on the Sava.

Andrew Walls called Mohammed and Mohammedanism "strangely influential", the work of "one of nature's amateurs" who knew no Arabic. He saw Smith as influenced by F. D. Maurice and the nascent study of comparative religion as represented by Max Müller, with a "cheerful evolutionism". Smith's overall theme was "responsibilities attaching to British imperial and military power."

Other books were:

- Carthage and the Carthaginians (1878 abridged edit. 1881, Rome and Carthage), seven lectures also delivered before the Royal Institution.
- Life of Lord Lawrence (1883, two vols.) This was an official biography of John Lawrence, 1st Baron Lawrence, Viceroy of India, and ran to seven editions. He declined other work of similar kind.

=== Controversialist ===
Bosworth Smith intervened in political, religious, and debates, mainly through letters to The Times or articles in the reviews. During the Russo-Turkish War (1877–1878) he defended the Turkish character, and insisted on the danger to India of Russia's forward policy. In 1885 he urged the permanent British occupation of the Sudan, and in 1892 he protested against the evacuation of Uganda, which was not carried out. On 20 October 1892, speaking for a deputation of the British and Foreign Anti-Slavery Society to Lord Rosebery, then Foreign Secretary, he pleaded for "the continuity of the moral policy of England." His letters were reprinted as a pamphlet.

In the autumn of 1885 he defended the Church of England against W. E. Gladstone's and Joseph Chamberlain's menaces of disestablishment. To an early evangelical background he added a liberal tolerance, but his loyalty as churchman was intense. Gladstone replied vaguely to his appeal for some reassuring message to liberal churchmen. Smith's letters were published by the Church Defence Institution as a pamphlet Reasons of a Layman and a Liberal for opposing Disestablishment.

=== Ornithology ===
- Birds of Marlborough, (1863)
- Bird Life and Bird Lore, (1905, new edit. 1909), based on articles in the Nineteenth Century, with other chapters descriptive of Dorset life.

== Family ==
On 9 August 1865 Bosworth Smith married Flora, fourth daughter of the Rev. Edward Dawe Wickham, rector of Holmwood, Surrey (1851–1893), and sister of Archdale Palmer Wickham; the fifth daughter, Alice Bertha, was wife of Bosworth's elder brother, Henry John Smith (1838–1879). Bosworth Smith's own handwriting was all but illegible, and Flora copied out what he wrote for publication, and most of his important private letters. She survived him, and died in 1927. Their children included:

- Gerald Hugh Bosworth Smith (born 1868), married 1893 Olive Yates, daughter of Charles Yates of Florida. He was educated at Marlborough College, and became a farmer in Cuba.

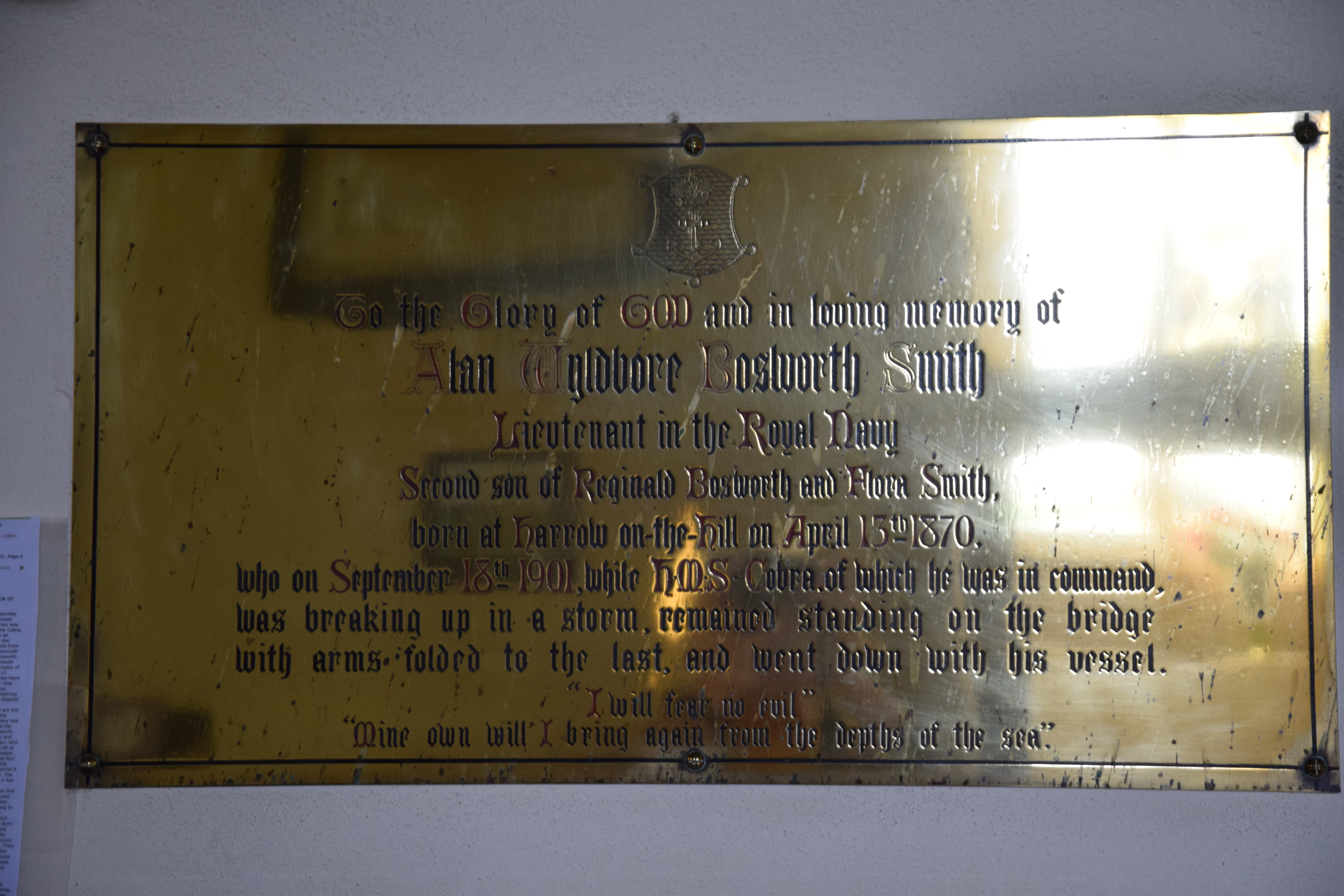
Memorial plaque to Alan Wyldbore Bosworth Smith in Bingham's Melcombe Church

- Alan Wyldbore Bosworth Smith (born 1870), lieutenant R.N., second son, lost his life at sea when in command of HMS Cobra (18 September 1901). He went down on the bridge of the vessel.
- Reginald Montagu Bosworth Smith (born 1871), third son. Basuto Police, married 1905 Agnes Val Davies.
- Bertrand Nigel Bosworth Smith (1873–1947), Indian Civil Service.
- Mervyn Henry Bosworth-Smith, fifth son, (1878–1950). In 1905 he founded a trading post at Malealea, now in Lesotho. He married, firstly in 1914, Sophie Warmington, daughter of John Warmington.
- Nevil Digby Bosworth Smith (born 1886). Educated at Harrow School and Pembroke College, Cambridge, he became an education inspector in 1911. As Nevil D. B. Smith, he married in 1913 Gladys Wood.
- Ellinor, eldest daughter, married firstly Harry Langhorne Thompson in 1894, and secondly in 1907 Sir Edward Grogan, 2nd Baronet.
- Emily Winifred (Frida) (1875–1919), second daughter, married in 1907 August Heisler (1881–1953), a German physician with from 1910 a practice in the Black Forest.
- Lorna, third daughter, married in 1906 Edwin Goldmann. The wedding was attended by Thomas Hardy and his wife Emma Gifford. Lorna died in 1919, after her husband, leaving a daughter Lorna (born 1908) who became a ward of Goldmann's brother Sydney Goldman, and in 1927 married Stewart Gore-Browne. Hardy wrote one of his final poems, "Lorna the Second", informed by Gore-Browne's earlier interest in her mother, who had turned him down for Goldmann. Gore-Browne met Lorna II at the funeral of Bosworth Smith's wife Flora.
- Bertha Joan. She married firstly, Charles Sinclair Shephard, an army officer, in 1911 as his second wife. As Bertha J. B. Shephard, she married secondly, in 1939, Reuben Cochrane.
