= Shropham Hall =

Country house in Shropham, Norfolk, England

Coordinates: 52.5041°N 0.9001°E

Shropham Hall is an early Georgian country house in Shropham in the county of Norfolk. It was completed by 1729 for John Barker, later High Sheriff of Norfolk. It was later the home of Sir Edward Grogan, 2nd Baronet. The hall is listed Grade II on the National Heritage List for England.
