= William Westbrooke Burton =

Australian politician

Sir William Westbrooke Burton
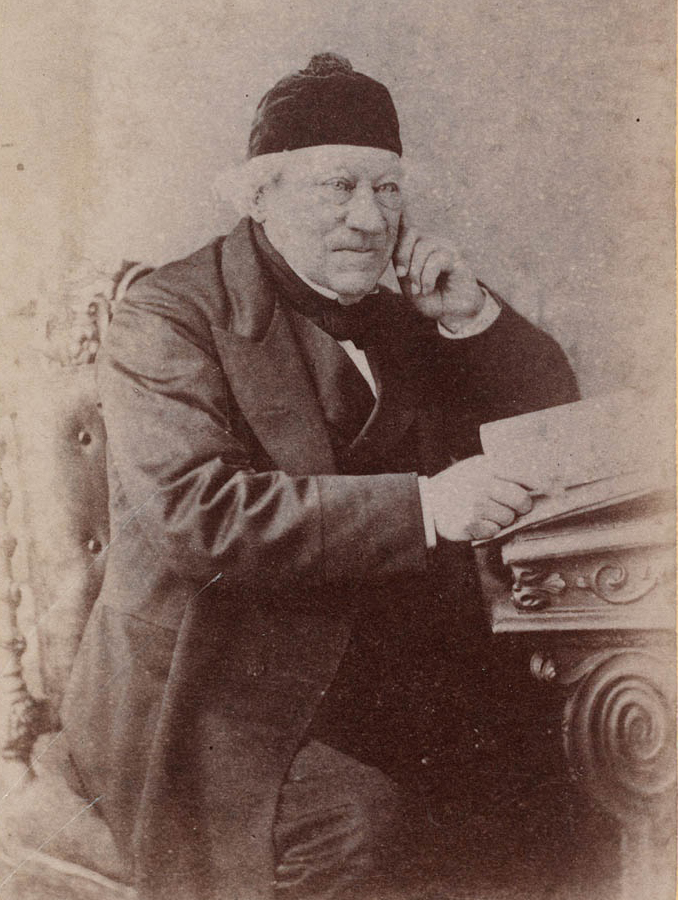
- Sir William Burton, c. 1880

President of the New South Wales Legislative Council
- In office 9 February 1858 – 10 March 1861
- Preceded by: John Plunkett
- Succeeded by: William Wentworth

Personal details
- Born: 31 January 1794 Daventry, Northamptonshire, England
- Died: 6 August 1888 (aged 94) London, England

Sir William Westbrooke Burton (31 January 1794 – 6 August 1888) was a judge and President of the Legislative Council, New South Wales, Australia. He was presiding judge in the second trial of the Myall Creek massacre. The trial was the only case in Australian history in which white settlers were successfully prosecuted for massacring Aboriginals.

== Early life ==
Burton was born in Daventry, Northamptonshire, England, the fifth son of Edmund Burton, solicitor, and his wife Eliza, a daughter of the Rev. John Mather. His uncle Charles Burton was a High Court judge who had a long and distinguished career in Ireland. Burton was educated at Daventry Grammar School and entered the Royal Navy as a midshipman in 1807 and served in the Conqueror under Thomas Fellowes, a very strict disciplinarian and later a rear-admiral. He saw service off Toulon in 1811, and at New Orleans in 1814. He later served in the Barham, Tonnant and Ortando, and visited Lisbon, Cadiz, the Canaries, the Mediterranean, the East and West Indies and China.

== Legal career ==
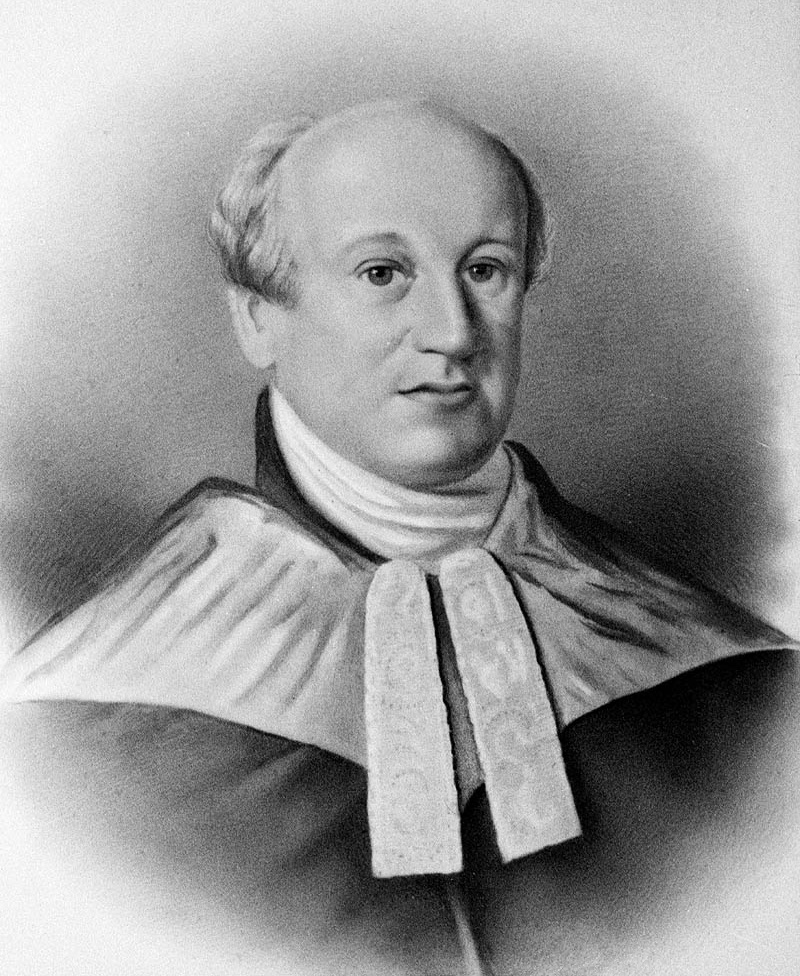
William Westbrooke Burton 1794-1888

Burton then studied law. In July 1834 he presided over the trial of some convict leaders who had mutinied.

Following the brutal killing of 28 unarmed Aboriginal Australians in the Myall Creek massacre on 10 June 1838, Burton presided over the second trial, in which a jury convicted seven colonists of the murder of a single Aboriginal child (referred to as "Charley"). Prior to sentencing, Burton gave a speech to the men convicted. A reporter present summarized what Burton, who teared up during his speech, said.

This is not a case where any provocation has been given, which might have been pleaded in excuse for the deed…

The murder was not confined to one man, but extended to many, including men, women, children, and babies hanging at their mothers’ breasts, in numbers not less than 30 human souls — slaughtered in cool blood. This massacre was committed upon a poor defenceless tribe of Blacks, dragged away from their fires at which they were seated, resting secure in the protection of one of the prisoners. Unsuspecting harm, they were surrounded by a body of horsemen, 12 or 13 in number, from whom they fled to the hut, which provided the mesh of destruction. In that hut the prisoners, unmoved by the tears, groans, and sighs, bound them with cords — fathers, mothers, and children indiscriminately – and carried them away to a short distance, when the scene of slaughter commenced, and stopped not until all were exterminated, with the exception of one woman.

I do not mention these circumstances to add to the agony of that moment, but to portray to those standing around the horrors which attended this merciless proceeding, in order, if possible, to avert similar consequences hereafter.

It appears that extraordinary pains have been taken by the prisoners, or by some persons deeply interested in the concealment of their crime, to prevent the murder from coming to light. But, it has pleased Almighty God to conduct a person to that heap of human remains, to be a witness of the scene, before the heap was taken away bit by bit, as it evidently had been, to remove every vestige of the murder.

The crime was, however, committed in the sight of God, and the blood of the victims cries for vengeance.

In 1844, Burton was appointed a judge at Madras, leaving New South Wales on 6 July 1844, three months before the death of Chief Justice Sir James Dowling. He was knighted in 1844. Burton carried out his judicial duties at Madras and retired to Sydney in 1857.

== Political career ==
Burton was nominated to the Legislative Council and sworn in on 11 August 1857. In March 1858 he was appointed its President by the Governor.

== Late life ==
He died on 6 August 1888.

Burton married Margaret, daughter of Leny Smith, a crêpe manufacturer of Hackney Wick, London, and his cousin Maria Alphonsine, daughter of John Beattie West, MP for Dublin City, and Elizabeth Felicia Burton, the daughter of William's Uncle Charles.

== See also ==
- List of judges of the Supreme Court of New South Wales
