= Harry Langhorne Thompson =

British colonial administrator

Sir Harry Langhorne Thompson KCMG

Administrator of Saint Vincent
- In office 1895–1900
- Preceded by: John Hartley Sandwith
- Succeeded by: Edward John Cameron

Administrator of Saint Lucia
- In office 1900–1902
- Preceded by: Charles Anthony King-Harman
- Succeeded by: Sir George Melville

Personal details
- Born: 6 February 1857 London
- Died: 28 April 1902 (aged 45) Saint Lucia
- Spouse: Ellinor Smith
- Relations: Sir Ralph Wood Thompson, KCB

Sir Harry Langhorne Thompson KCMG (6 February 1857 – 28 April 1902) was a British colonial administrator in Cyprus and the West Indies.

== Early life ==
Thompson was born in London in 1857, the eldest son of Sir Ralph Wood Thompson, KCB (1830-1902), who later became Permanent Under-Secretary of State for War. He was educated at Winchester College, and joined the Control Department of the Army Pay Corps as Acting Assistant-Paymaster. He was appointed Assistant-Paymaster on 10 July 1874.

== Colonial career ==
Thompson joined the foreign service, and was appointed Assistant Commissioner of Paphos, southwestern Cyprus, in 1879, but two years later transferred to the bigger city of Limassol, on the south coast of the island. In 1883 he was back in Paphos where he was promoted to Commissioner, and in 1892 he was appointed Chief Secretary to the Government of Cyprus.

In February 1895, Thompson was appointed Administrator of St Vincent and its Dependencies, which was part of the British Windward Islands in the West Indies. He served as such until late 1900, and occasionally acted as administrator of the Windward Islands colony (in the absence of the governor) from January 1897. During his time there, the islands were visited by a severe hurricane in September 1898, causing widespread destruction. Thompson and his wife were both heavily involved in rescue work, which was recognized when he was appointed a Knight Commander of the Order of St Michael and St George (KCMG) in the Queen's Birthday Honours list on 23 May 1900. Later that year, he was appointed Administrator of Saint Lucia, where he died in his post in 1902.

== Family ==
Thompson married Ellinor Smith, daughter of author and schoolmaster Reginald Bosworth Smith. After the 1898 hurricane, Mrs. Thompson wrote accounts of the event for several newspapers, including The Times.

He died at Government House, St Lucia, on 28 April 1902, aged 45.

His widow remarried Colonel Sir Edward Grogan, 2nd Baronet.
