= William H. Grogan House =

Historic house in North Carolina, United States

- U.S. National Register of Historic Places
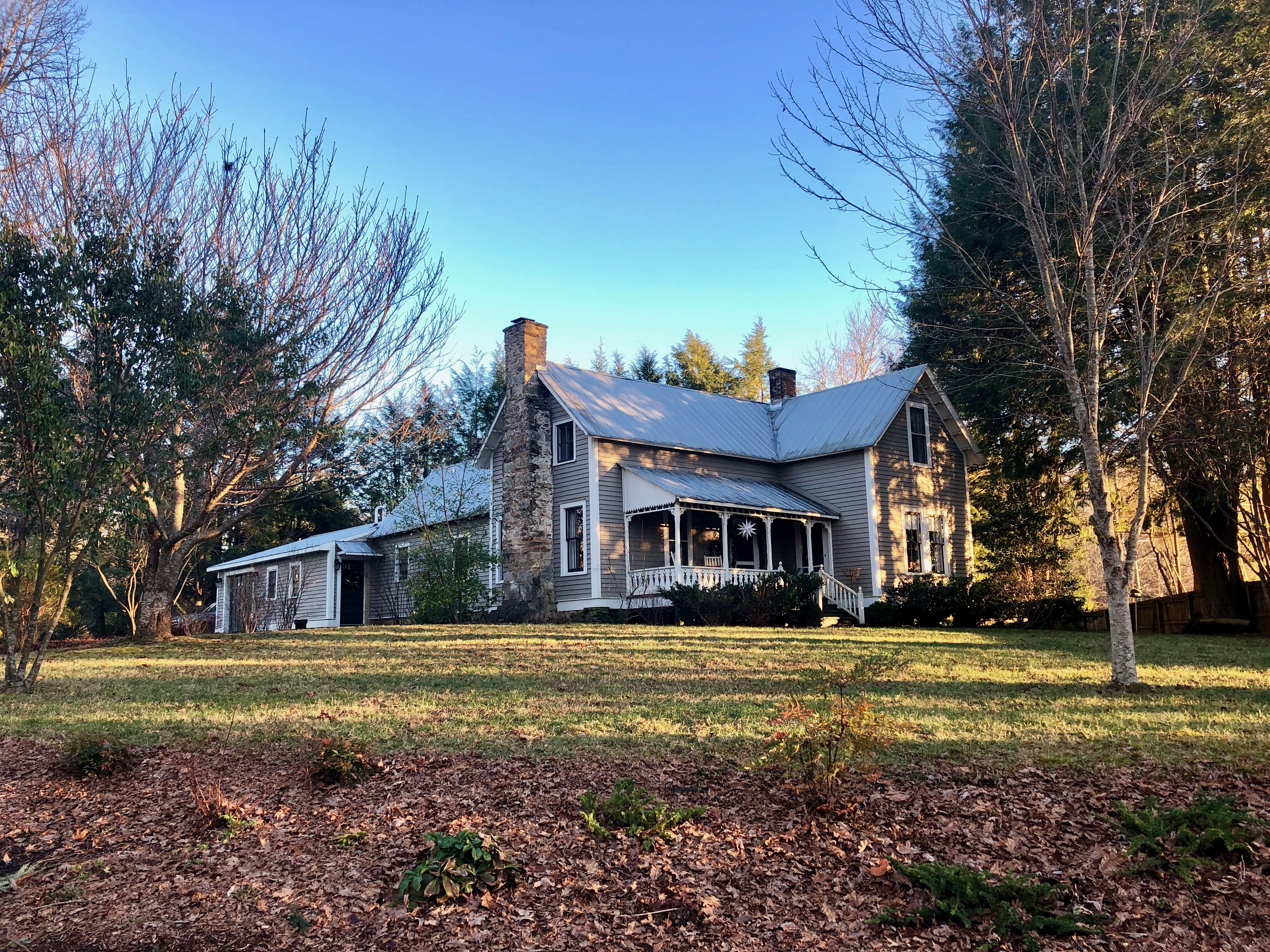
- William H. Grogan House, January 2019

- Location within North Carolina Location within the United States
- Location: 24 Warren La., Brevard, North Carolina
- Coordinates: 35°13′33″N 82°43′8″W
- Area: 0.5 acres (0.20 ha)
- Built: c. 1890
- Architectural style: Late Victorian
- MPS: Transylvania County MPS
- NRHP reference No.: 08000890
- Added to NRHP: September 10, 2008

William H. Grogan House is a historic home in Brevard, North Carolina. It was built about 1890, and is a 1 1/2-story, gable-front and wing form frame farmhouse, with Late Victorian style decorative details. It rests on a stone foundation and has a stepped, single shouldered, exterior stone chimney.

It was listed on the National Register of Historic Places in 2008.
