= Sir Edward Grogan, 1st Baronet =

British politician (1802–1891)

Sir Edward Grogan, 1st Baronet (5 November 1802 – 26 January 1891) was an Irish Conservative Party politician.

He was the eldest son of John Grogan, barrister, of Raheny, Dublin, and Sarah Medlicott. The Grogan family of Dublin were cousins of the Grogans of Johnstown Castle, County Wexford, who narrowly escaped forfeiture of their estates after the Irish Rebellion of 1798, in which they fought on the rebel side. Educated at Winchester College and Trinity College Dublin, Grogan matriculated with a M.A. degree. He was called to the bar in 1840. He was made a baronet on 23 April 1859, of Moyvore, County Westmeath.

He was elected as Member of Parliament (MP) for Dublin City at the 1841 general election, and held the seat until the 1865 general election. As a young man, he was a fierce opponent of Catholic Emancipation, but this had ceased to be a live issue long before he entered politics.

In 1867, he married Catherine Charlotte MacMahon, daughter of Sir Beresford Burston MacMahon, 2nd Baronet and Maria Bateson, and granddaughter of Sir William MacMahon, 1st Baronet, Master of the Rolls in Ireland. They had four children. In January 1891, he fell from the upstairs window of his home in Dundrum and suffered severe injuries, dying two weeks later.

He was succeeded in the title by his son Edward (1873–1927).

== Arms ==
Coat of arms of Sir Edward Grogan, 1st Baronet

Notes
Granted 1 April 1859 by Sir John Bernard Burke, Ulster King of Arms.
Crest
A lion's head erased Sable charged with a mullet Or.
Escutcheon
Barry of six Or and Sable on a chief engrailed Azure a lion passant of the first.
Motto
Honor Et Virtus

Parliament of the United Kingdom
| Preceded by Robert Hutton and Daniel O'Connell | Member of Parliament for Dublin City; 1841–1865; With: John Beattie West to 1842; William Henry Gregory 1842–1847; John Reynolds 1847–1852; John Vance 1852–1865 | Succeeded by Jonathan Pim and Benjamin Guinness |
Baronetage of the United Kingdom
| New creation | Baronet (of Moyvore); 1859–1891 | Succeeded by Edward Grogan |
