= Grogan =

Grogan is a surname. The Irish version is Ó Gruagáin.

== List of persons ==
Notable people with the surname include:

- Benjamin Grogan, FBI agent killed in the 1986 FBI Miami shootout
- Clare Grogan (born 1962), Scottish actress and singer
- Clem Grogan (born 1951), real name Steve Dennis Grogan, an American murderer and former member of the Manson Family
- Cornelius Grogan (1738?–1798), a member of the Society of United Irishmen
- David Grogan (1914–1993), British water polo player
- Edward Grogan (disambiguation), several people
- Emmett Grogan (1943–1978), founder of the hippie group the Diggers
- Ewart Grogan (1874–1967), British explorer of Africa, Kenyan businessman
- George Grogan (1875–1962), British Army officer, recipient of the Victoria Cross
- Ione Grogan (1891–1961), American academic and educator
- James Grogan (1931–2000), American figure skater
- Janet Grogan, Irish singer and songwriter
- John Grogan (born 1957), American journalist and non-fiction writer
- John Grogan (disambiguation), several people
- Kevin Grogan (footballer) (born 1981), Irish football player
- Larry Grogan (1899-1979), Irish Republicanism activist
- Liz Grogan, Canadian television host
- Nathaniel Grogan (1740–1807), Irish illustrator
- Patricia Grogan (born 1962), American politician from Florida
- Raymond G. Grogan (1920–2016), American phytopathologist
- Shelley Grogan (born 1967), American judge
- Steve Grogan (born 1953), American football player
- Grogan, a ring name of Matthew Waters (born 1985), American professional wrestler

== Fictional characters ==
- Grogan family (John, Jenny, Patrick, Connor, Colleen, Marley) from the 2008 U.S. dramedy film Marley & Me (film)
- Ally Grogan, fictional character from 2012 from the British soap opera Hollyoaks
- Damien Grogan, fictional character from 2016 from the Australian soap opera Home and Away
- Little Mickey Grogan, titular character from the eponymous 1927 U.S. comedy film
- Smiler Grogan, fictional ex-con played by Jimmy Durante from the 1963 U.S. comedy film It's a Mad, Mad, Mad, Mad World
- Tom Grogan, titular character, a side character from the eponymous best-selling 1896 U.S. novel by Francis Hopkinson Smith
- William Grogan, a telegrapher in William Saroyan's 1943 novel The Human Comedy

== See also ==
- Nan Grogan Orrock, American politician
