= Grogan baronets =

Extinct baronetcy in the Baronetage of the United Kingdom

- Escutcheon of the Grogan baronets of Moyvore
- Creation date: 1859
- Status: extinct
- Extinction date: 1927
- Motto: Honor et virtus, Honour and virtue

The Grogan Baronetcy, of Moyvore in the County of Westmeath, was a title in the Baronetage of the United Kingdom. It was created on 23 April 1859 for the Irish politician Edward Grogan. His son, the second Baronet, was an officer in the British Army. The latter was childless and the title became extinct on his death in 1927.

The Grogan Baronets were a junior branch of the Grogan family of Johnstown Castle, County Wexford, who played a prominent role in the Irish Rebellion of 1798.

== Grogan baronets, of Moyvore (1859) ==
- Sir Edward Grogan, 1st Baronet (1802–1891)
- Sir Edward Ion Beresford Grogan, 2nd Baronet (1873–1927)
