= Sir Edward Grogan, 2nd Baronet =

British Army officer (1873–1927)

Colonel Sir Edward Ion Beresford Grogan, 2nd Baronet, CMG, DSO (29 November 1873 – 11 July 1927) was a British Army officer.

== Military career ==
The son of the politician Sir Edward Grogan, 1st Baronet, and his wife Catherine (née MacMahon), daughter of Sir Beresford Burston MacMahon, 2nd Baronet, he was educated at Winchester College and the Royal Military College, Sandhurst, and was commissioned into the Rifle Brigade in 1893. He succeeded his father as 2nd Baronet in 1891. He served in the Second Boer War from 1899 to 1900 with the 1st Battalion, including in the Relief of Ladysmith, and was mentioned in dispatches. From 1904 to 1906 he served as a Staff Captain at the War Office in London, and then served with the Imperial Ottoman Gendarmerie in Macedonia from 1906 to 1908. In March 1911, he served as a military attaché in South America, and was promoted to the temporary rank of lieutenant-colonel while so employed. He held the position until 1914.

He commanded the 1st Battalion, Rifle Brigade during the First World War and served at Salonika, being mentioned in dispatches three times and awarded the Distinguished Service Order (DSO) in 1917. In 1918, he was appointed General Staff Officer Grade 1 (GSO1) with the British Military Mission in Siberia during the Russian Civil War. He was promoted Brevet Colonel in 1919 and appointed Companion of the Order of St Michael and St George (CMG) in the Siberian War Honours of January 1920. He retired in 1924.

== Family ==
Grogan married, in 1907, Ellinor Smith, daughter of author and schoolmaster Reginald Bosworth Smith and widow of Sir Harry Langhorne Thompson (d. 1902).

In July 1927 he shot himself with his Webley revolver at his seat, Shropham Hall, near Attleborough, Norfolk, after being ill for a long time. He and his wife had no children and the baronetcy became extinct.

== Arms ==
Coat of arms of Sir Edward Grogan, 2nd Baronet

Notes
Granted 1 April 1859 by Sir John Bernard Burke, Ulster King of Arms.
Crest
A lion's head erased Sable charged with a mullet Or.
Escutcheon
Barry of six Or and Sable on a chief engrailed Azure a lion passant of the first.
Motto
Honor Et Virtus

== Footnotes ==
Baronetage of the United Kingdom
Preceded by Edward Grogan	Baronet (of Moyvore); 1891–1927	Extinct
