= Sir Robert Shaw, 1st Baronet =

Irish politician

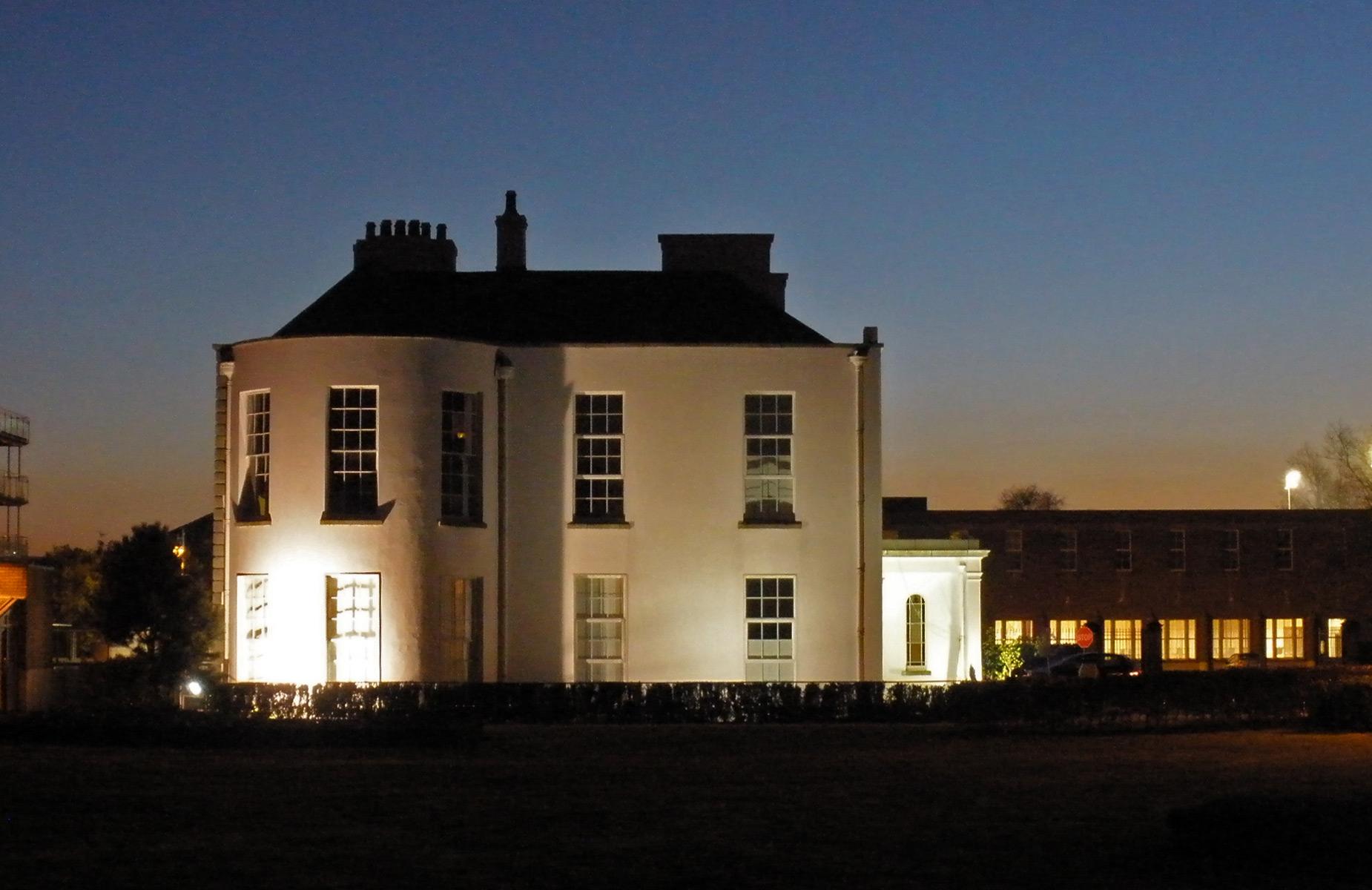
Bushy Park house

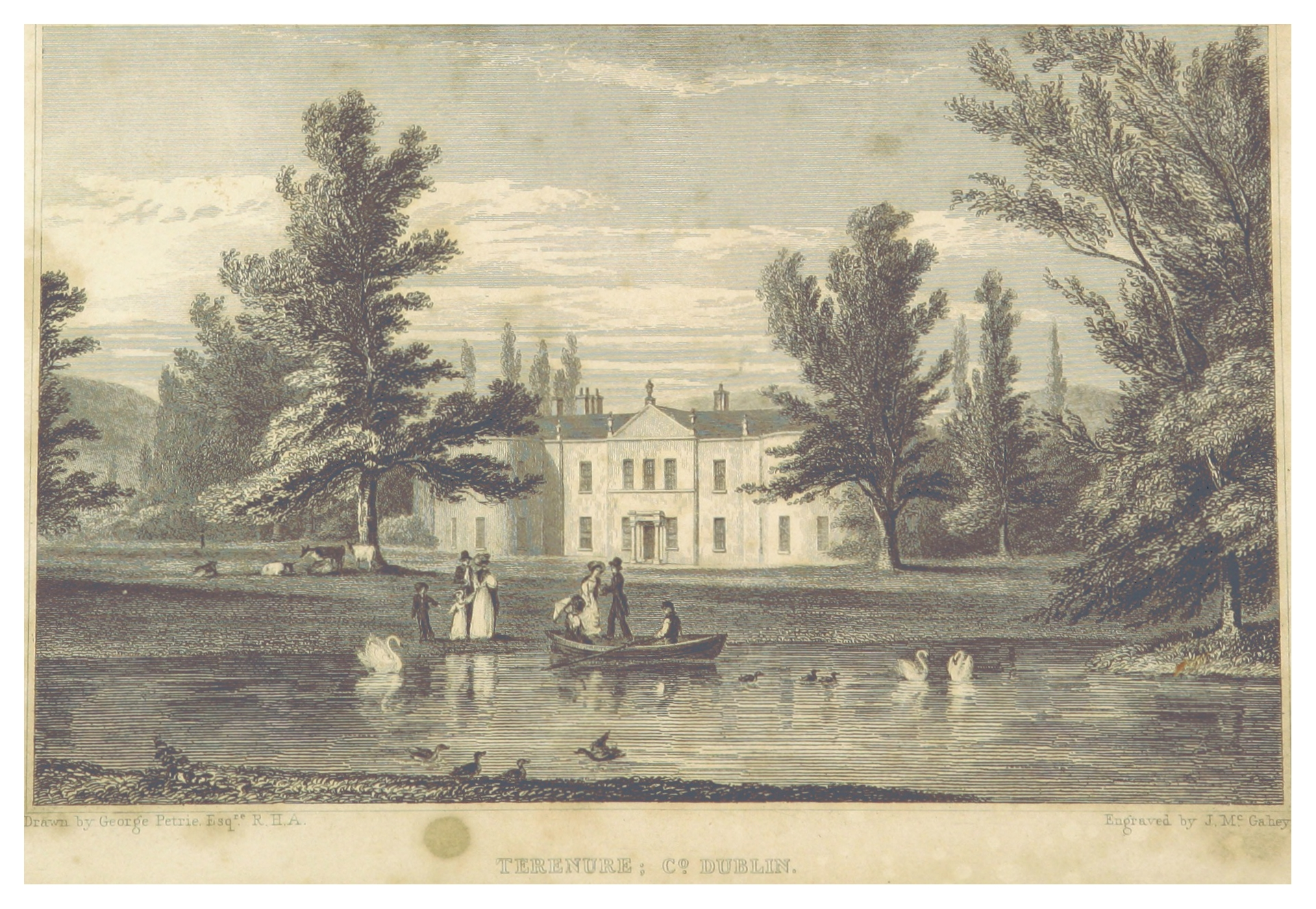
Terernure House from an illustration of 1837. The house was later purchase by the Carmelites and forms part of Terenure College as of 2023.

Colonel Sir Robert Shaw, 1st Baronet (29 January 1774 – 10 March 1849) of Bushy Park, Dublin was a Tory UK Member of Parliament, who represented Dublin City from 1804 to 1826.

== Early life ==
Robert Shaw Jr was born in 1774, the eldest son of Robert Shaw Sr. His father had moved to Dublin in the mid-18th century, prospered as a merchant and became Accountant-General of the Post Office.

Shaw was also the great-great-grandson of William Shaw, who, in 1689, had gone to Ireland and fought for King William at the Battle of the Boyne and been rewarded with the grant of land there.

== Career ==
In 1796, Shaw became a Dublin Sheriff's peer, a position he held until 1808, and was appointed High Sheriff of County Dublin for 1806–07. He was an alderman of Dublin from 1808 to 1841 and was elected Lord Mayor of Dublin for 1815–16. Between 1799 and 1800, Shaw served in the Irish House of Commons for Bannow.

After the Acts of Union, Shaw replaced the former Tory MP John Claudius Beresford as an MP for Dublin City in the Parliament of the United Kingdom in a by-election on 31 March 1804. Shaw retained the seat until he retired, at the dissolution of Parliament in 1826.

Shaw was also Colonel of the Royal Dublin Militia and the chairman of the board of the South Dublin Union, seats that fell vacant on his death.

== Family seat and baronetcy ==
In 1785, Shaw's father had acquired Terenure House, an estate of 35 acres (140,000 m^{2}). When Shaw married his wife Maria in January 1796, her dowry included the 110-acre (0.45 km^{2}) estate, Bushy Park (possibly named after Bushy Park in Teddington) which adjoined Terenure House. Six months later, Shaw succeeded his father to the Terenure estate, which he sold in 1806, establishing Bushy Park House as the family seat (which was then occupied by members of the Shaw family until 1951).

Shaw was created a baronet (i.e. becoming Sir Robert) on 17 August 1821. He was formally invested by George IV when he visited Ireland in 1822.

== Personal life ==
Shaw married Maria Wilkinson, the daughter and heiress of Abraham Wilkinson, on 7 January 1796, and as a dowry received £10,000 together with the Bushy Park estate. Maria died in 1831 having borne nine children, including 6 sons, of whom only 3 outlived their father (Robert, Frederick and Charles). Their surviving daughter, Charlotte, married Sir William MacMahon, 1st Baronet, Master of the Rolls in Ireland and had eight children.

Sir Robert's cousin, Bernard Shaw, had died in 1826 and Sir Robert had provided Bernard's widow, Frances, with a cottage on the Terenure estate where she lived for the next 45 years. One of Frances' grandchildren, George Bernard Shaw, was to be a regular visitor. On several occasions, Sir Robert proposed to Frances, but she turned him down each time.

In July 1834, he married Amelia Spencer at Twickenham Parish Church. The couple kept a home in Twickenham, and were closely involved in the formation of the Twickenham Independent (Congregational) chapel.

== Death ==
Sir Robert died on 10 March 1849 at Bushy Park, Dublin, aged 75. His body was interred on 16 March. Shaw was succeeded as baron by his eldest son, Lt Col. Sir Robert Shaw, 2nd Baronet, and then by his younger son Sir Frederick Shaw, 3rd Baronet.

Parliament of the United Kingdom
Preceded by John Claudius Beresford; John La Touche	Member of Parliament for Dublin City; 1804–1826; With: John La Touche 1804–1806; Henry Grattan 1806–1820; Thomas Ellis 1820–1826	Succeeded by Henry Grattan; George Moore
Parliament of Ireland
Preceded by William Loftus; Ephraim Carroll	Member of Parliament for Bannow; 1799–1800; With: William Loftus	Succeeded by William Loftus; Joseph McClean
Baronetage of the United Kingdom
New creation	Baronet (of Bushy Park); 1821–1849	Succeeded by Robert Shaw
Civic offices
Preceded by John Claudius Beresford	Lord Mayor of Dublin; 1815–1816	Succeeded by Mark Bloxham
