= Sir Frederick Shaw, 3rd Baronet =

Irish Conservative MP and judge

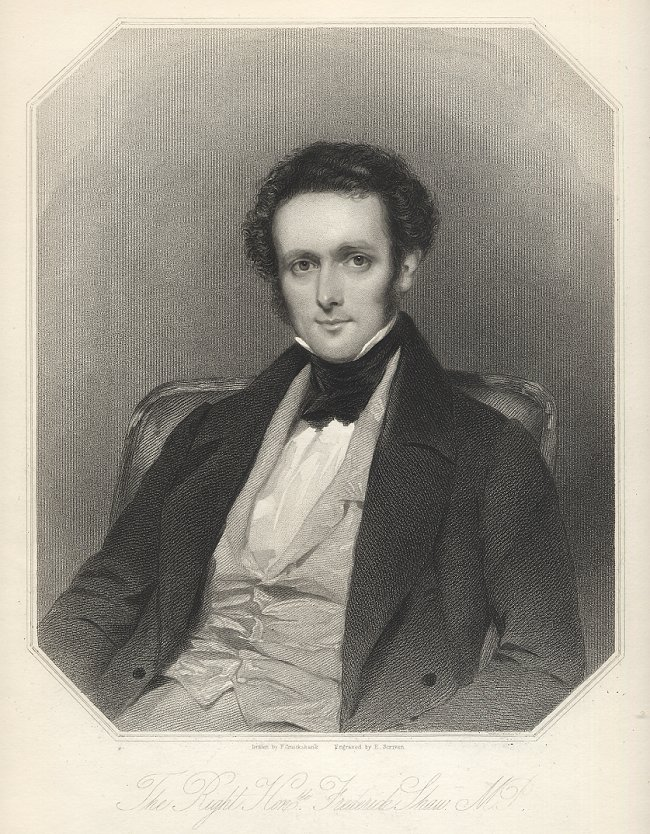
Sir Frederick Shaw

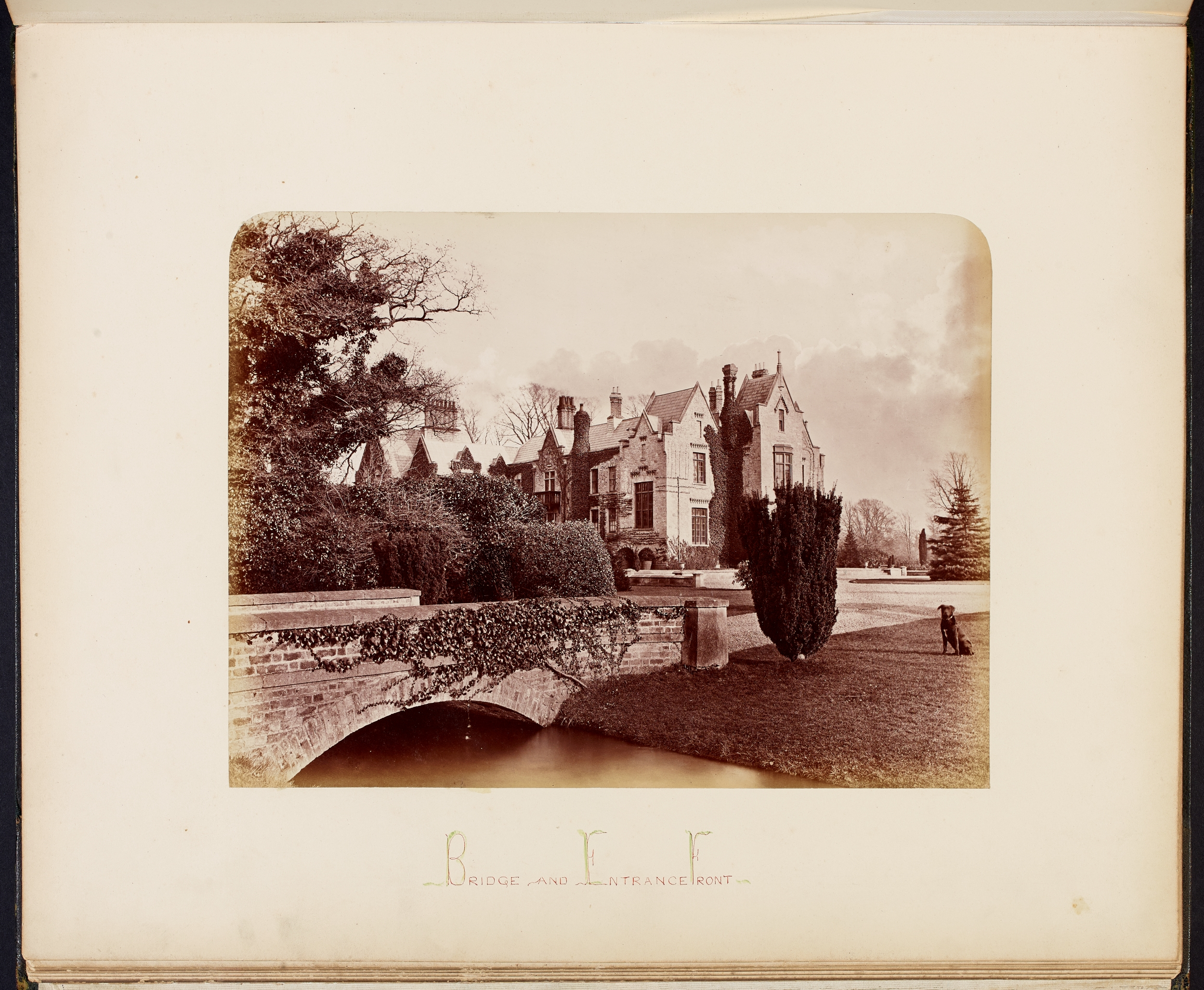
Kimmage House entrance front circa 1870

Sir Frederick Shaw, 3rd Baronet (11 December 1799 – 30 June 1876) was an Irish Conservative MP in the United Kingdom Parliament, and a judge.

He was the second son of Colonel Sir Robert Shaw, Baronet of Bushy Park, Dublin and his first wife Maria Wilkinson, daughter and heiress of Abraham Wilkinson. He became a member of the Privy Council of Ireland on 15 January 1835. Shaw became the 3rd Baronet on 19 February 1869 on the death of his elder brother Robert.

He attended Trinity College Dublin (BA and MA 1832, LLB and LLD 1841), and subsequently Brasenose College, University of Oxford (BA). He became a member of King's Inns, Dublin and was called to the Irish Bar in 1822. He held the judicial offices of Recorder of Dublin, (a part-time municipal judge) and also of Dundalk. His status as a judge did not debar him from sitting in the House of Commons, although the propriety of the dual role was frequently questioned, and in 1832 there was an unsuccessful move in the Commons to make him vacate the Recordership. On the other hand, he was praised as a hardworking and conscientious magistrate.

He married on 16 March 1819, Thomasine Emily, the daughter of George Jocelyn, MP, of Newport, County Tipperary, Member of Parliament for Dundalk and Thomasine Bowen, and granddaughter of Robert Jocelyn, 1st Earl of Roden. They had eight children. Thomasine died in 1859.

He was MP for Dublin City in 1830–1831 and 1832. He represented Dublin University, 1832–1848. He resigned his seat by becoming Steward of the Chiltern Hundreds. He was generally regarded as the leader of the Irish Conservative Party.

A devout member of the Church of Ireland and a member of the Orange Order, he was sometimes accused of bias against Roman Catholics, and comments he reportedly made on the subject in 1835 led to a heated debate in the House of Commons, at which he was present and defended himself vigorously in the face of attacks by Daniel O'Connell among others. His fellow MPs noted that while his normal speaking style was "cold and monotonous", he invariably became fierce and passionate when speaking of religion.

He lived in Kimmage Manor from 1829 right up to his death in 1876. Upon succeeding to the Baronetcy in 1869 he decided to stay in Kimmage which he had extended and developed rather than move to the other family residence of nearby Bushy Park House in Terenure.

== Death ==
He died on 30 June 1876 and was interred in St Mary's Church, Crumlin, Dublin. His eldest son, Robert Shaw (1821–1895), succeeded to his baronetcy.

== Relatives ==
He was a distant relative of the writer George Bernard Shaw, whose father was a cousin of Frederick Shaw.

The journalist Flora Shaw, Lady Lugard, DBE was a grandchild, daughter of his son, General George Shaw

== Notes ==
Parliament of the United Kingdom
Preceded by George Moore; Henry Grattan	Member of Parliament for Dublin City; 1830–1831; With: George Moore	Succeeded by Robert Way Harty; Louis Perrin
Preceded by Robert Way Harty; Louis Perrin	Member of Parliament for Dublin City; 1831–1832; With: Viscount Ingestre	Succeeded by Daniel O'Connell; Edward Southwell Ruthven
Preceded by Thomas Lefroy	Member of Parliament for Dublin University; 1832–1848; With: Thomas Lefroy 1832–1842; Joseph Devonsher Jackson 1842–1843; George Alexander Hamilton 1843–1848	Succeeded by George Alexander Hamilton; Joseph Napier
Baronetage of the United Kingdom
Preceded by Robert Shaw	Baronet (of Bushy Park); 1869–1876	Succeeded by Robert Shaw
