= Harty =

Harty may refer to:

- Harty, Kent, England, a village
- Harty (surname), a list of people
- Harty baronets, an extinct title in the Baronetage of the United Kingdom
- Harty, a community in the township of Val Rita-Harty, Ontario, Canada
- Dr Harty Cup, an annual inter-schools hurling competition organised by the Munster PPS GAA division of the Gaelic Athletic Association

== See also ==
- Hearty (disambiguation)
