= Lorenzo Moore =

Lorenzo Moore may refer to:

- Lorenzo Moore (MP for Dungannon) (1744–1798), a British Cavalry officer and a Member of the Irish Parliament for the constituency of Dungannon
- Sir Lorenzo Moore (British Army officer) (c. 1765–1837), a British Army officer who fought in the Napoleonic Wars
- Lorenzo Moore (cleric) (1808–1894), a New Zealand Anglican clergyman
