= Harty (surname) =

Harty is a surname. Notable people with the surname include:

- Herbert Hamilton Harty (1879–1941), Irish and British composer, conductor, pianist and organist
- Ian Harty (born 1978), Scottish footballer
- Jeremiah James Harty (1853–1927), Catholic Archbishop of Manila and Bishop of Nebraska.
- John Harty (born 1958), former American football defensive tackle
- Martin Harty (1919–2017), member of the New Hampshire House of Representatives
- Maura Harty (born c. 1959), United States Assistant Secretary of State for Consular Affairs
- Patricia Harty (born 1941), American actress and dancer
- Rhett Harty (born 1970), American soccer defender
- Robert Harty (1779–1832), British politician and Whig Member of Parliament
- Russell Harty (1934–1988), English television presenter
- William Harty (1847–1929), Ontario businessman and politician.

== See also ==
- Harty, Kent, England
- Harty, Ontario, Canada, a community in the township of Val Rita-Harty
- Hearty
