= Thomas Ellis (Irish politician) =

Irish politician (c. 1774–1832)

Thomas Ellis (c. 1774–1832) was a Tory UK Member of Parliament representing Dublin City in 1820–1826.

In a by-election on 30 June 1820 Ellis replaced the deceased former Whig MP the Right Honourable Henry Grattan. The Whig candidate defeated in the by-election was the great orators son also called Henry Grattan. Ellis retained the seat until he retired, at the dissolution of Parliament, in 1826.

Parliament of the United Kingdom
Preceded by Henry Grattan; Sir Robert Shaw, Bt	Member of Parliament for Dublin City; 1820–1826; With: Sir Robert Shaw, Bt	Succeeded by Henry Grattan; George Moore
