= Hearty =

Hearty may refer to:

- Hearty (surname), a list of people
- Hearty White (born 1964), American radio host and musician
- HMS Hearty, various Royal Navy ships

== See also ==
- Hearty elimia, an extinct species of freshwater snail
