= Henry Grattan =

Irish politician (1746–1820)

The Right Honourable Henry Grattan PC
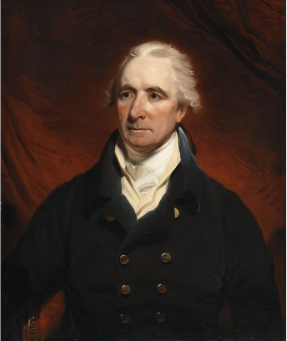
- Portrait by Martin Archer Shee

Member of Parliament for Dublin City
- In office 17 December 1806 – 14 April 1820
- Preceded by: Robert Shaw
- Succeeded by: Thomas Ellis

Member of Parliament for Malton
- In office 4 March 1805 – 17 December 1806
- Preceded by: Charles Dundas
- Succeeded by: Charles Wentworth

Member of the Ireland Parliament for Wicklow
- In office 10 August 1800 – 1 January 1801
- Preceded by: Daniel Grahan
- Succeeded by: Office abolished

Member of the Ireland Parliament for Dublin City
- In office 1 May 1790 – 19 July 1798
- Preceded by: Travers Hartley
- Succeeded by: John Claudius Beresford

Member of the Ireland Parliament for Charlemont
- In office 26 October 1775 – 1 May 1790
- Preceded by: Francis Caulfield
- Succeeded by: Richard Sheridan

Personal details
- Born: 3 July 1746 Fishamble Street, Dublin, Ireland
- Died: 4 June 1820 (aged 73) Portman Square, London, England
- Resting place: Westminster Abbey, London, England
- Party: Patriot (until 1801); Whig (until 1820)
- Spouse(s): Henrietta Fitzgerald (m. 1782; d. 1820)
- Children: James; Henry; Mary; Harriet
- Education: Trinity College Dublin
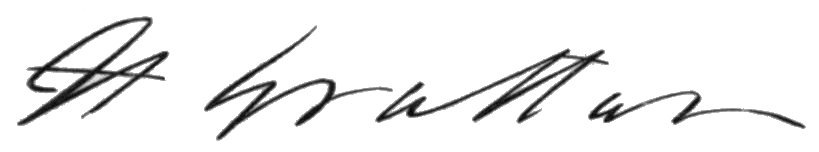
- Signature

Henry Grattan (3 July 1746 – 4 June 1820) was an Irish politician and lawyer who campaigned for legislative freedom for the Irish Parliament in the late 18th century from Great Britain. He was a Member of the Irish Parliament (MP) from 1775 to 1801 and a Member of Parliament (MP) in Westminster from 1805 to 1820. He has been described as a superb orator and a romantic. With generous enthusiasm he demanded that Ireland should be granted its rightful status, that of an independent nation, though he always insisted that Ireland would remain linked to Great Britain by a common crown and by sharing a common political tradition.

Grattan opposed the Act of Union 1800 that merged the Kingdoms of Ireland and Great Britain, but later sat as a member of the united Parliament in London.

== Early life ==
Henry Grattan was born in Fishamble Street, Dublin, and baptised in the nearby church of St. John the Evangelist in 1746. A member of the Anglo-Irish elite of Protestant background, Grattan was the son of James Grattan MP, of Belcamp Park, County Dublin and Mary, youngest daughter of Thomas Marlay, Attorney-General of Ireland, Chief Baron of the Irish Exchequer and finally Lord Chief Justice of the Court of King's Bench and his wife Anne de Laune. Grattan attended Drogheda Grammar School and then went on to become a distinguished student at Trinity College Dublin, where he began a lifelong study of classical literature, and was especially interested in the great orators of antiquity. Like his friend Henry Flood, Grattan worked on his natural eloquence and oratory skills by studying models such as Bolingbroke and Junius. In the late 1760s and early 1770s, he spent some years in London, and he visited France in 1771. He attended debates in the British House of Commons regularly, and also enjoyed visiting the celebrated Grecian Coffee House in Devereux Court, where he met Oliver Goldsmith. It was in London where he formed his lifelong friendship with Robert Day, later a judge of the Court of King's Bench.

After studying at the Middle Temple, London and then King's Inns, Dublin, Grattan was called to the Irish Bar in 1772. He never seriously practised law but was drawn to politics, influenced by Flood. He entered the Irish Parliament for Charlemont in 1775, sponsored by Lord Charlemont, just as Flood had damaged his credibility by accepting the office of Lord High Treasurer of Ireland. Grattan quickly superseded Flood in the leadership of the national party, not least because his oratorical powers were unsurpassed among his contemporaries.

== In the Irish Parliament ==
Catholics, who made up the majority of the Irish population, were completely excluded from public life at this time under the penal laws, in force in Ireland from 1691 until the early 1780s. The Presbyterians of Ulster had a lot more power as they were primarily of British ancestry, although most of the penal laws also affected them. Power was held by the King's Viceroy and by a small element, the Anglo-Irish families loyal to the Anglican Church of Ireland who owned most of the land.

The politicians of the national party now fought for the Irish Parliament, not with the intention of liberating the Catholic majority, but to set the Irish parliament free from constitutional bondage to the British Privy Council. By virtue of Poynings' Law, a statute of King Henry VII of England, all proposed Irish legislation had to be submitted to the Privy Council for its approval under the Great Seal of England before being passed by the Irish Parliament. A bill so approved might be accepted or rejected, but not amended. More recent British Acts had further emphasised the complete dependence of the Irish parliament, and the appellate jurisdiction of the Irish House of Lords had also been annulled. Moreover, the British Houses claimed and exercised the power to legislate directly for Ireland without even the nominal concurrence of the parliament in Dublin. This was the constitution which William Molyneux and Swift had denounced, which Flood had attacked, and which Grattan was to destroy, becoming leaders of the Patriot movement.

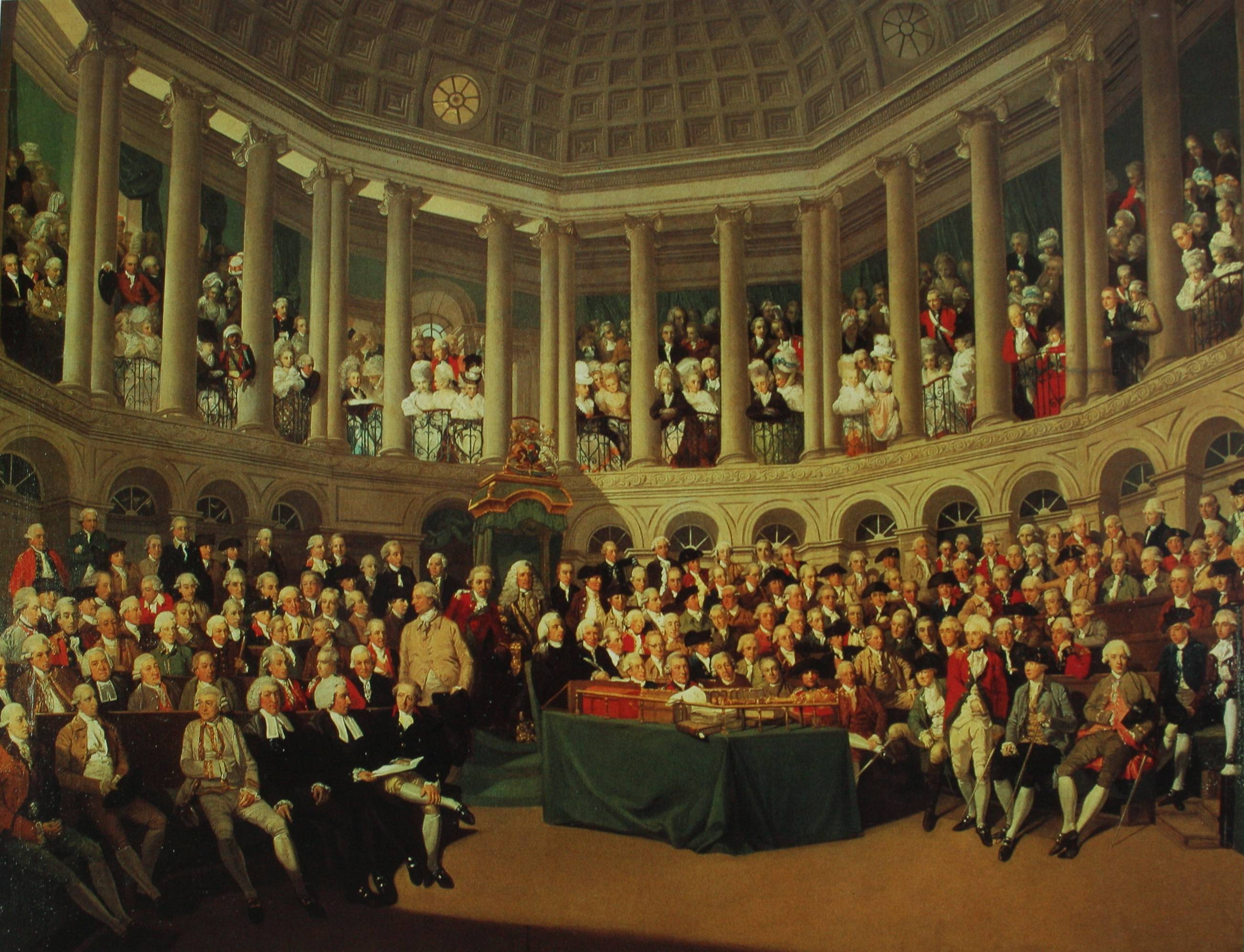
Grattan (standing on right in red jacket) addressing the Irish House of Commons on 8 June 1780

Calls for the legislative independence of Ireland at the Irish Volunteer Convention at Dungannon, County Tyrone, greatly influenced the decision of the government in 1782 to make concessions. It was through ranks of Volunteers drawn up outside the Irish Parliament in Dublin that Grattan passed on 16 April 1782, amidst unparalleled popular enthusiasm, to move a declaration of the independence of the Irish parliament. A posthumous publication of Grattan's speeches which were revised by Grattan himself contains his speech from this day which became famous in Irish political history: "I found Ireland on her knees," Grattan exclaimed, "I watched over her with a paternal solicitude; I have traced her progress from injuries to arms, and from arms to liberty. Spirit of Swift, spirit of Molyneux, your genius has prevailed! Ireland is now a nation!" However, the parliamentary register for that sitting contains no record of these lines meaning Grattan most likely altered the speech in later years. After a month of negotiation, the claims of Ireland were conceded. The gratitude of his countrymen to Grattan was shown by a parliamentary grant of £100,000, which had to be reduced by half before he would accept it.

Grattan then asked for the British House of Commons to reconfirm the British Government's decision, and on 22 January 1783, the final Act was passed by parliament in London, including the text:

Be it enacted that the right claimed by the people of Ireland to be bound only by laws enacted by his Majesty and the Parliament of that kingdom, in all cases whatever shall be, and is hereby declared to be established and ascertained for ever, and shall at no time be questioned or questionable.

In September of the same year, Grattan became a member of the Privy Council of Ireland. He was expelled in 1798, but was re-admitted on 9 August 1806. In Dublin, he was a member of Daly's Club.

== Grattan's Parliament ==
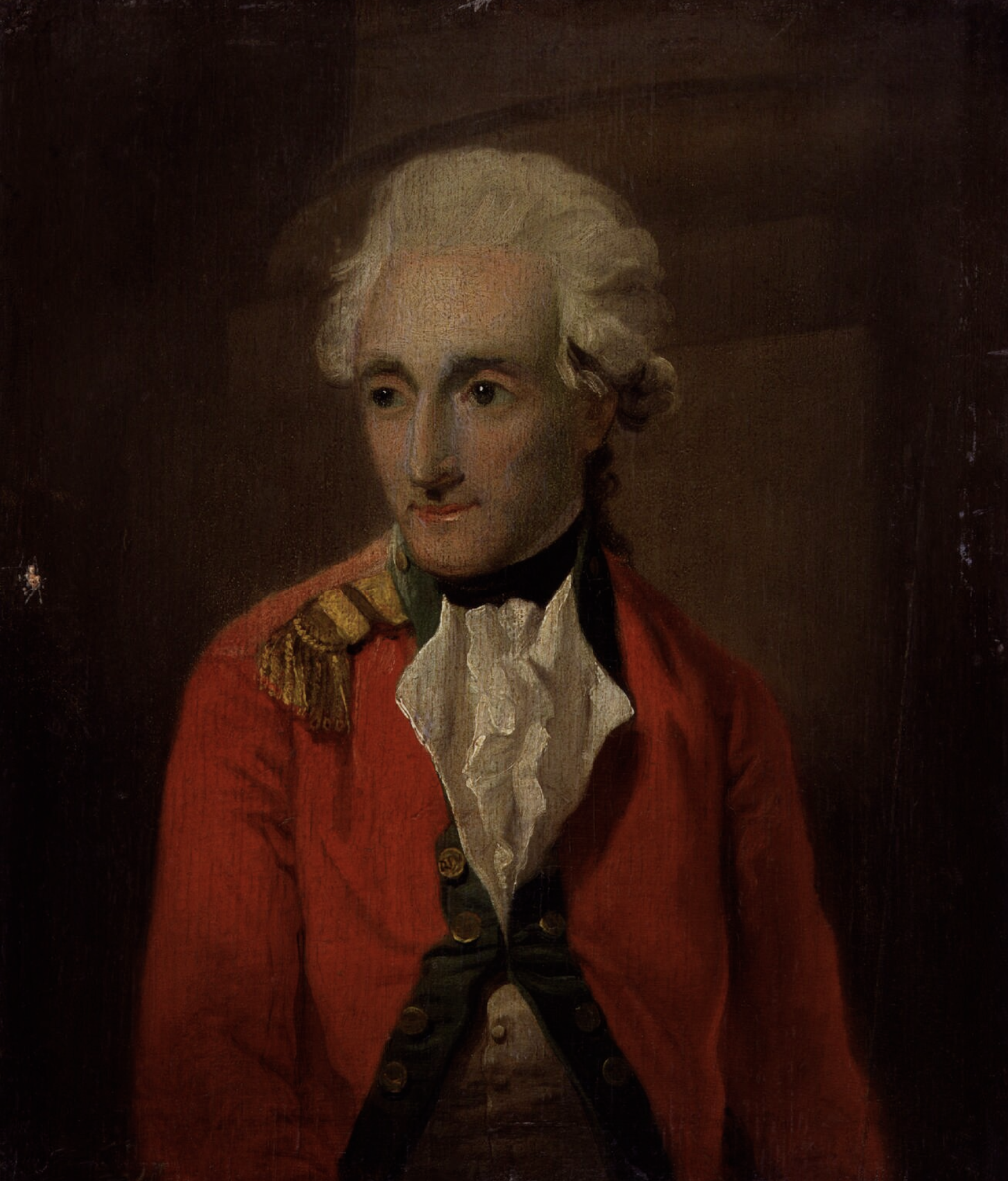
1780 portrait of Grattan in his Volunteers uniform

One of the first acts of Grattan's Parliament was to prove its loyalty to the constitution by passing a vote for the support of 20,000 sailors for the Royal Navy. Grattan was loyal to the Crown and the British connection. He was, however, anxious to achieve moderate parliamentary reform, and, unlike Flood, he favoured Catholic Emancipation. It was evident that without reform, the Irish House of Commons would not be able to make much use of its newly won legislative independence. Though now free from Westminster constitutional control, it was still subject to the influence of corruption, which the British government had wielded through the British and Irish borough owners, known as the "undertakers", or more directly through the great executive offices. Grattan's Parliament had no control over the Irish executive. The Lord Lieutenant of Ireland and his chief secretary continued to be appointed by the British ministers; their tenure of office depended on the vicissitudes of English, not Irish, party politics; the royal prerogative was exercised in Ireland on the advice of British ministers.

The Irish House of Commons was unrepresentative of the Irish people at a time when democracy was rare in Europe. The majority were excluded, who were either Roman Catholics or Presbyterians; two-thirds of the members of the House of Commons were returned by small boroughs at the disposal of individual patrons, whose support was bought by the distribution of peerages and pensions. It was to give stability and true independence to the new constitution that Grattan pressed for reform.

Having quarrelled with Flood over simple repeal, Grattan also differed from him on the question of maintaining the Volunteer Convention. Drawing the attention of the House to "the alarming measure of drilling the lowest classes of the populace", Grattan implied that reformers had a duty to protect the prerogatives of property even as they protested its abuses. Better that those who had been "respectable" as the armed "property of the nation" should retire than run the risks of an "armed beggary". (Writing a generation later, Thomas MacNevin proposed that Grattan's judgement marked "the transition point", when "composed of a different class of men, and ruled by politicians with very different views", the rump of the Volunteer movement entered upon "a career which terminated only in the establishment of the United Irishmen").

Grattan also opposed the policy of protective duties in favour of Pitt's commercial propositions in 1785 for establishing Free Trade between Great Britain and Ireland. This, however, had to be abandoned owing to the hostility of the British mercantile classes. Grattan supported the government for a time after 1782, and spoke and voted for the repressive legislation that followed the Whiteboy violence in 1785; but as the years passed and without Pitt's personal favour towards parliamentary reform resulting in legislation, he gravitated towards the opposition, agitated for commutation of tithes in Ireland, and supported the Whigs on the regency question in 1788. In 1790, Grattan was elected for Dublin City, a seat he held until 1798.

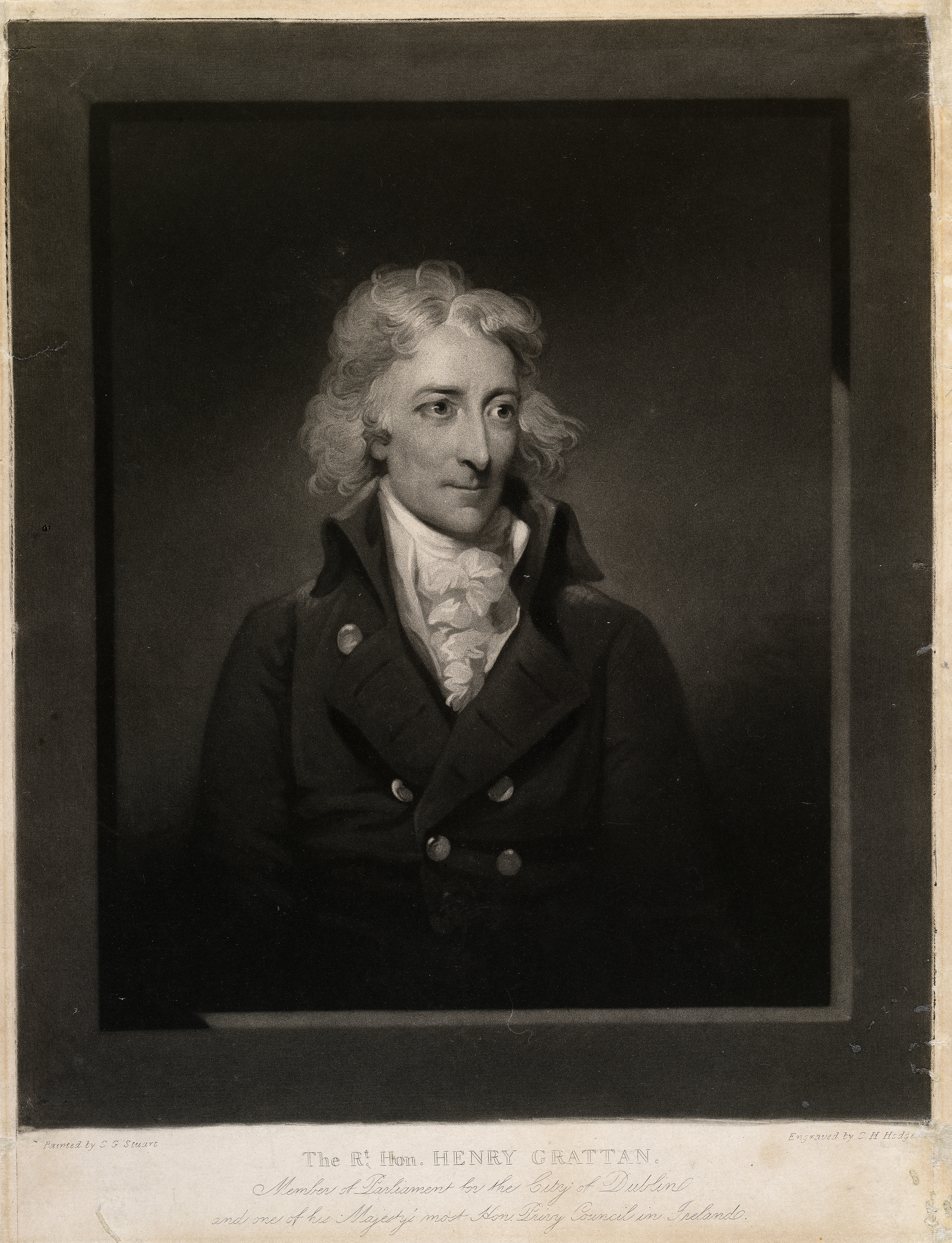
Henry Grattan, MP, 1792

In 1792–93, he succeeded in carrying the Roman Catholic Relief Act 1793, conferring the franchise on Catholics; in 1794, in conjunction with William Ponsonby, he introduced a reform bill which was even milder than Flood's bill of 1783. He was as anxious as Flood had been to retain the legislative power in the hands of men of property. Grattan had a strong conviction that while Ireland could best be governed by the Irish, democracy in Ireland would inevitably turn to plunder and anarchy. At the same time, he wished to open membership of the House of Commons to Catholic men of property, a proposal that was the corollary of the Roman Catholic Relief Act 1793.

The defeat of Grattan's mild proposals helped to promote more extreme opinions, which, under growing influence from France, were now making inroads in Ireland. The Catholic question had come to the fore, and when a powerful section of the Whigs joined Pitt's ministry in 1794, Lord Fitzwilliam, who shared Grattan's views, was appointed Viceroy, expectations for further Catholic relief were raised. That may have been Pitt's intention, but it is not clear how far Lord Fitzwilliam had been authorised to pledge the government. Fitzwilliam privately asked Grattan to propose a bill for Catholic emancipation, promising British government support. It appeared, however, that the Viceroy had either misunderstood or exceeded his instructions; on 19 February 1795, Fitzwilliam was recalled. In the outburst of indignation, followed by increasing disaffection which this produced in Ireland, Grattan acted with conspicuous moderation and loyalty. This won him warm acknowledgements from a member of the British cabinet.

That cabinet, however, doubtless influenced by the wishes of the King, to whom Emancipation was anathema, was now determined to firmly resist the Catholic demands, with the result that Ireland rapidly drifted towards rebellion. Grattan warned the government in a series of masterly speeches of the lawless condition to which Ireland had been driven. He could now count on no more than 40 followers in the Irish House of Commons, and his words were unheeded. In protest, he retired from parliament in May 1797, and departed from his customary moderation by attacking the government in his 24-page Letter to the Citizens of Dublin, in which he said it was now "absolutely necessary to reform the state" as the people no longer had confidence in Parliament.

== Rebellion and Union ==
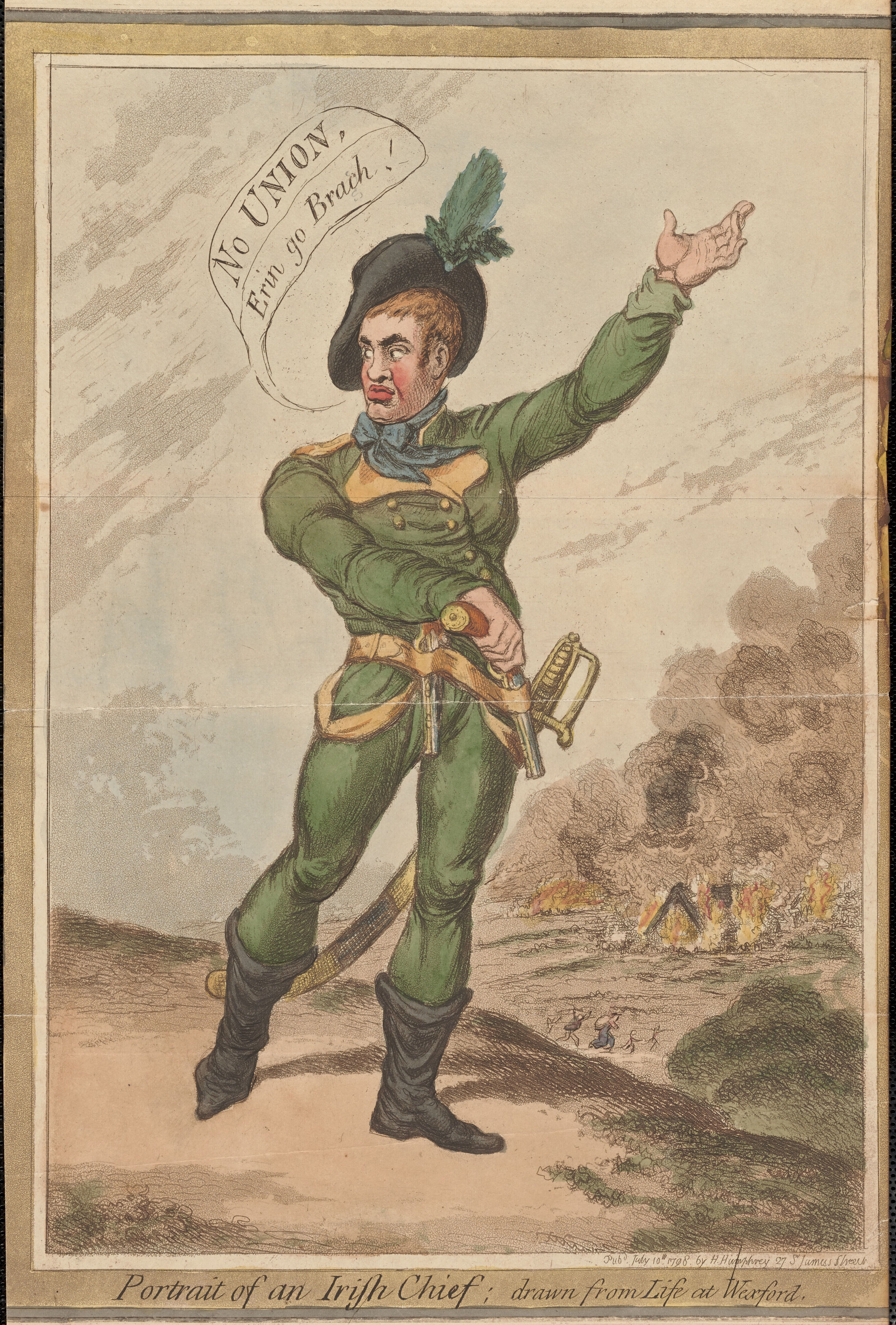
1798 caricature of Grattan by James Gillray

At this time antipathy towards the Anglican elite in Ireland was such that people of different faiths were ready to combine for common political objects. Thus the Presbyterians of the north, who were mainly republican in sentiment, combined with a section of the Roman Catholics to form the United Irishmen organisation, promoting revolutionary ideas imported from France; and a party prepared to welcome a French invasion soon came into existence. Thus stimulated, the increasing disaffection culminated in the 1798 rebellion. The Presbyterian-Catholic rebellion in Ulster was accompanied by outbreaks elsewhere, notably in County Wexford. Grattan was lampooned by James Gillray as a rebel leader for his liberal views and his stance against a political union with Britain.

Almost immediately, the project of a legislative union between the British and Irish parliaments, which had been from time to time discussed since the beginning of the 18th century, was taken up in earnest by Pitt's government. Grattan fiercely denounced the scheme.

The constitution of Grattan's parliament offered no security, as the differences over the regency question had made evident that in matters of imperial interest the policy of the Irish parliament and that of Great Britain would be in agreement. At a moment when Britain was engaged in a life-and-death struggle with France, it was impossible for the ministry to ignore the danger, recently emphasised by the fact that the independent constitution of 1782 offered no safeguard against armed revolt. Sectarian violence during the rebellion put an end to the growing reconciliation between Roman Catholics and Presbyterians, and the island divided anew into two hostile factions.

It was from the Anglican established church, and particularly from the Orangemen, that the bitterest opposition to the union proceeded. The proposal found support among the Roman Catholic clergy and especially the bishops, while in no part of Ireland was it received with more favour than in the city of Cork. This attitude of the Catholics was caused by Pitt's encouragement of the expectation that Catholic emancipation, the commutation of tithes, and the endowment of the Catholic priesthood, would accompany or quickly follow the passing of the measure.

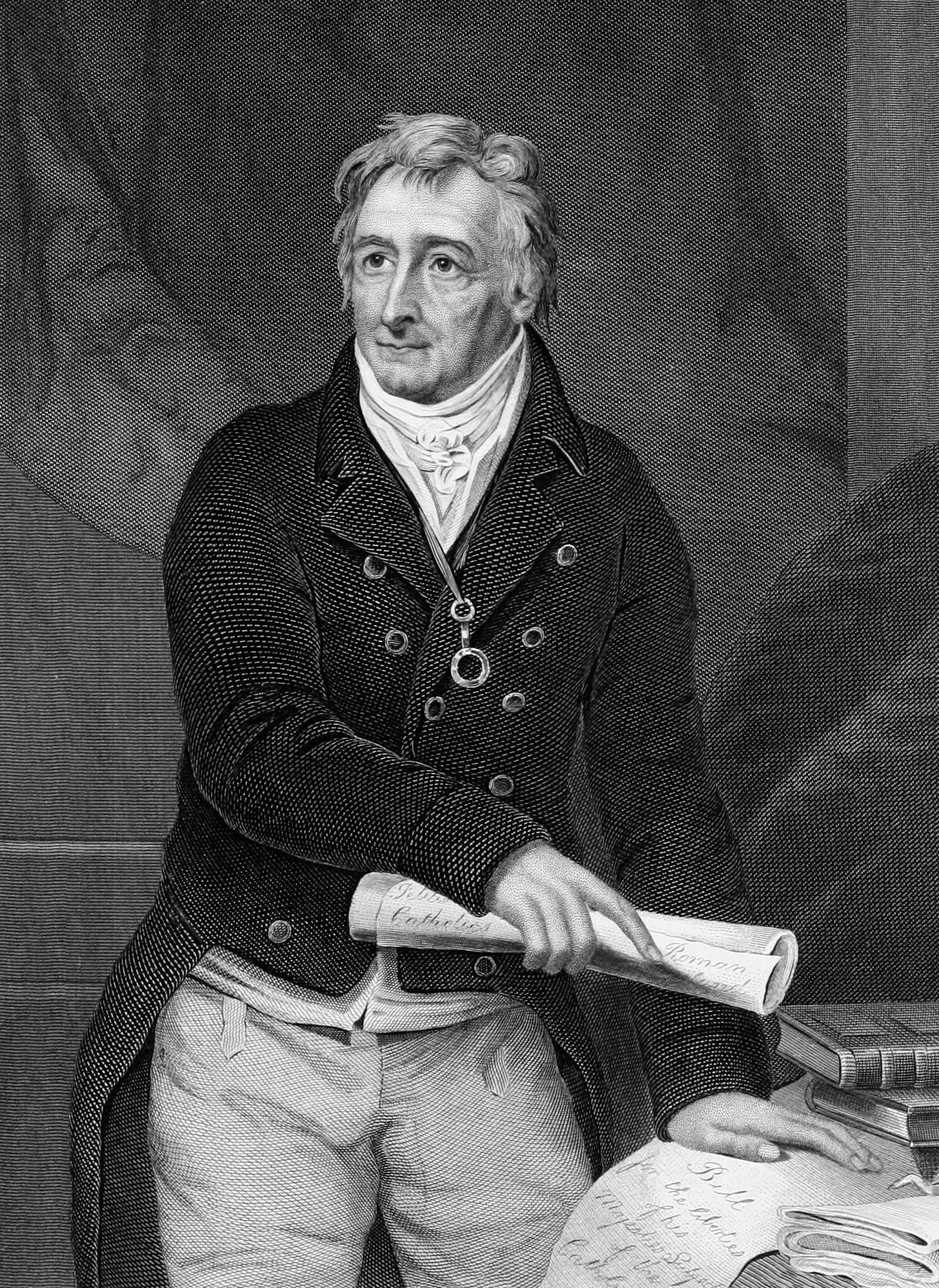
Engraving of Grattan

When in 1799, the government brought forward its bill it was defeated in the Irish House of Commons. Grattan was still in retirement. His popularity had declined, and the fact that his proposals for parliamentary reform and Catholic emancipation had become the watchwords of the United Irishmen had brought him the bitter hostility of the governing classes. He was dismissed from the Privy Council; his portrait was removed from the hall of Trinity College; the Merchant Guild of Dublin struck his name off their rolls. The threatened destruction of the constitution of 1782 quickly restored its author to his former place in the affections of the Irish people. The parliamentary recess had been employed by the government in securing by lavish corruption a majority in favour of their policy. On 15 January 1800, the Irish Parliament met for its last session; on the same day Grattan secured by purchase a seat for Wicklow; and at a late hour, while the debate was proceeding, he appeared to take his seat, and was cheered from the galleries. Grattan's strength gave way when he rose to speak, and he obtained leave to address the House sitting. Nevertheless, his speech was a superb effort of oratory; for more than two hours he kept them spellbound. After prolonged debates Grattan, on 26 May, spoke finally against the committal of the bill, ending with an impassioned peroration in which he declared, "I will remain anchored here with fidelity to the fortunes of my country, faithful to her freedom, faithful to her fall." These were the last words spoken by Grattan in the Irish Parliament.

The bill establishing the union was carried through its final stages by substantial majorities. One of Grattan's main grounds of opposition to the union had been his dread of seeing the political leadership in Ireland pass out of the hands of the landed gentry; and he prophesied that the time would come when Ireland would send to the united parliament a hundred of the greatest rascals in the kingdom. Like Flood before him, Grattan had no leaning towards democracy; and he anticipated that by the removal of the centre of political interest from Ireland the evil of absenteeism would be intensified.

== In the Parliament of the United Kingdom of Great Britain and Ireland ==
For the next five years, Grattan took no active part in public affairs; it was not again until 1805, that he became a Member of the Parliament of the United Kingdom for Malton. He modestly took his seat on one of the back benches, until Fox brought him forward, exclaiming, "This is no place for the Irish Demosthenes!" His first speech was on the Catholic question and all agreed with the description of his speech by the Annual Register as one of the most brilliant and eloquent ever made within the walls of parliament. When Fox and William Grenville came into power in 1806 Grattan, who sat at this time for Dublin City, was offered, but refused to accept, an office in the government. In the following year, he showed the strength of his judgment and character by supporting, in spite of consequent unpopularity in Ireland, a measure for increasing the powers of the executive to deal with Irish disorder. Roman Catholic emancipation, which he continued to advocate with unflagging energy, though now advanced in age, became complicated after 1808 by the question whether a veto on the appointment of Roman Catholic bishops should rest with the crown.

Grattan supported the veto, but a more radical Catholic party was now arising in Ireland under the leadership of Daniel O'Connell, and Grattan's influence gradually declined. He seldom spoke in Parliament after 1810, the most notable exception being in 1815, when he separated himself from the Whigs and supported the final struggle against Napoléon. His last speech of all, in 1819, contained a passage referring to the Union he had so passionately resisted, which exhibits the statesmanship, and at the same time the equable quality, of Grattan's character. His sentiments with regard to the policy of the Union remained, he said, unchanged; but "the marriage, having taken place, it is now the duty, as it ought to be the inclination, of every individual to render it as fruitful, as profitable and as advantageous as possible."

== Death and legacy ==
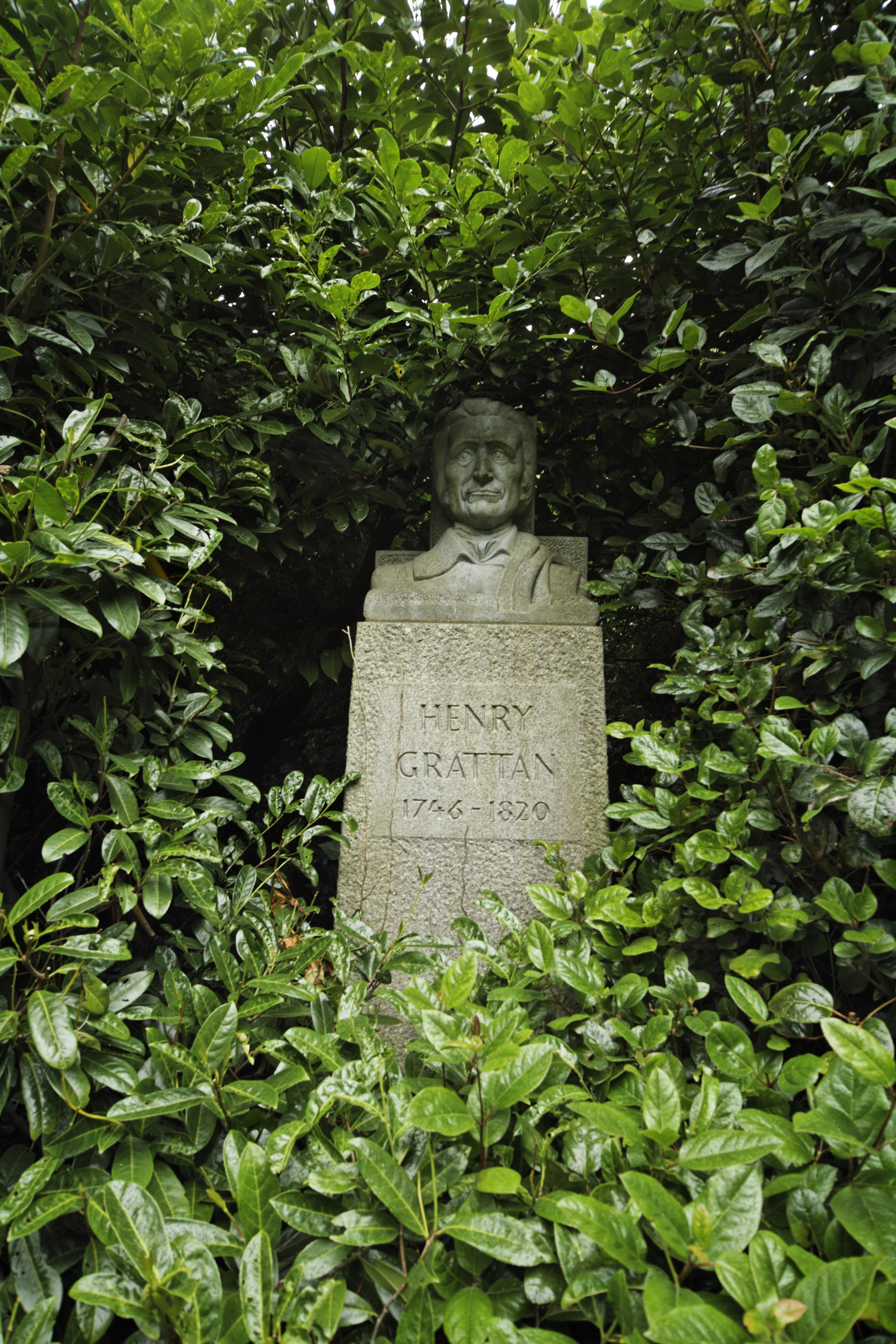
The bust of Henry Grattan in Merrion Square, Dublin

In the following summer, after crossing from Ireland to Britain when in poor health to bring forward the Irish question once more, he became seriously ill. On his deathbed he spoke generously of Castlereagh, and with a warm eulogy of his former rival, Flood. He died at his home in Portman Square on 4 June 1820, and was buried in Westminster Abbey close to the tombs of Pitt and Fox. His statue is in St Stephen's Hall in the Palace of Westminster.

Sydney Smith said of Grattan soon after his death: "No government ever dismayed him. The world could not bribe him. He thought only of Ireland; lived for no other object; dedicated to her his beautiful fancy, his elegant wit, his manly courage, and all the splendour of his astonishing eloquence."

Grattan Bridge crossing the river Liffey between Parliament Street on the south side of Dublin and Capel Street on the north side is named in his honour. The building housing the faculty of Law and Government at Dublin City University has also been named the Henry Grattan Building in his honour.

Grattan Square Dungarvan, County Waterford. The establishment of the Dungarvan Town Commissioners in 1855 was the catalyst for the renaming of many of Dungarvan Streets. Irish Nationalists and Catholics were finally getting a say in how they were governed and they set about renaming streets to reflect their nationalist sensibilities. Despite having no connection to Dungarvan that we know of, as one of the leading constitutional nationalists of his era Henry Grattan was an obvious choice when the Town Commissioners were looking for a new name. Grattan Square was constructed between 1806 and 1826 at the instigation of the Duke of Devonshire. The architecture of the square has changed little to this day.

== Family ==
Grattan's father was James Grattan (d. 1766), a Recorder and then MP for Dublin City, who married a daughter of Thomas Marlay, Mary.

Grattan married Henrietta Fitzgerald in 1782, the daughter of Nicholas Fitzgerald of County Mayo (d. 1761), a son of Thomas FitzGerald of Turlough, County Mayo and Elizabeth Browne. Henrietta's mother Margaret was the daughter of James Stephenson and Ann Price. Grattan's in-laws' history gave him a sensitivity to former Irish political difficulties, as Henrietta's Cavalier great-grandfather John Fitzgerald was transplanted from Gorteens Castle in County Kilkenny to Mayo in 1653 under the Cromwellian Settlement, and his son Thomas felt it necessary to conform to the Church of Ireland in 1717.

The Grattans had two sons and two daughters. The sons were James Grattan of Tinnehinch, MP for County Wicklow, and Henry Grattan Jnr of Moyrath, MP for Dublin City and then for County Meath. His daughter Mary Anne married first John Blachford (1771‐1832), and secondly Thomas Dalzell, 7th Earl of Carnwath, dying in 1853. Harriet (d.1865) married the Revd Wake of Courteenhall.

== Bibliography ==
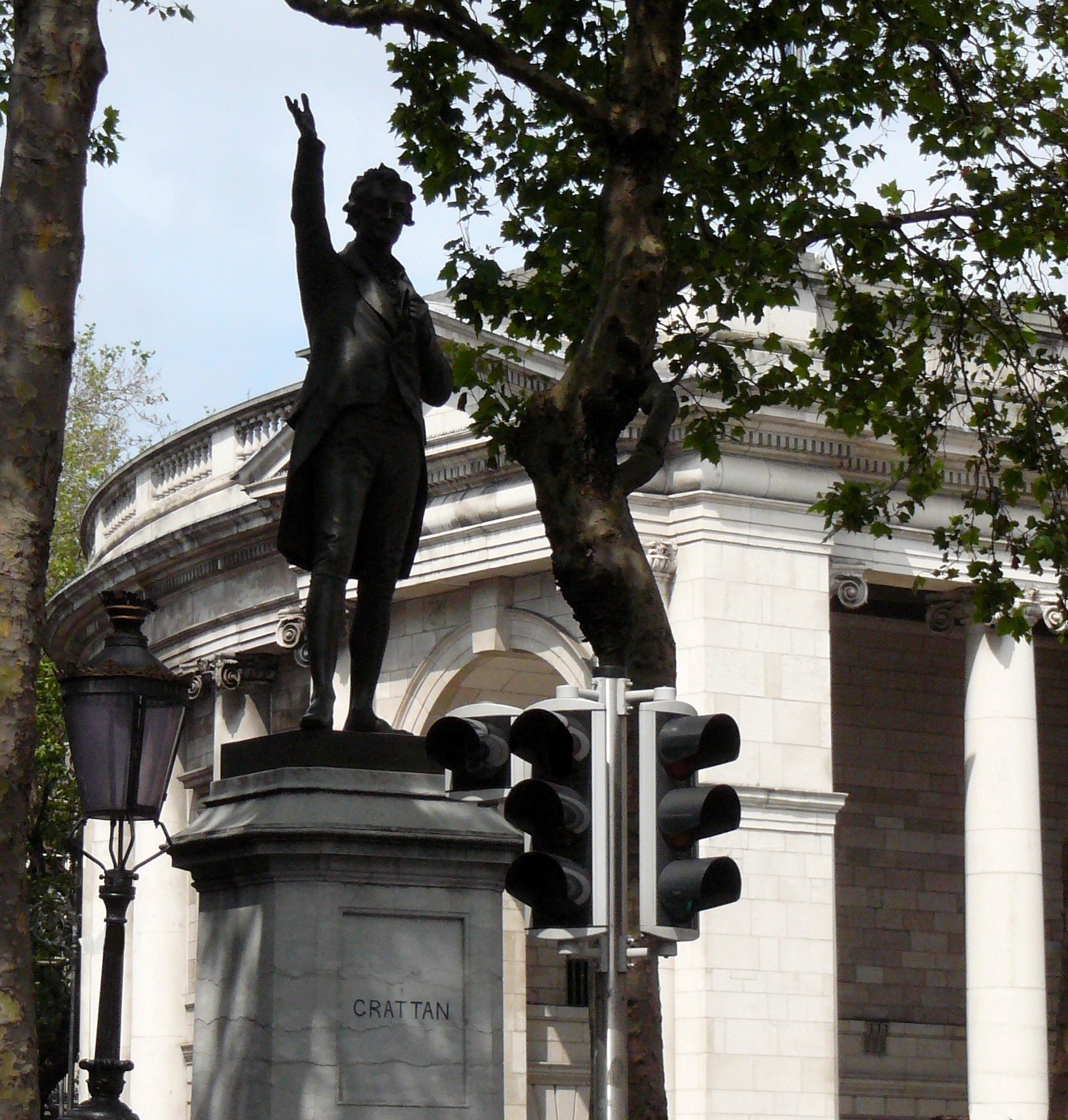
Grattan statue beside the old Irish Parliament, College Green, Dublin

- Gwynn, Stephen. Henry Grattan and his times (Greenwood Press, 1971)
- Kelly J. Henry Grattan (1993) Dundalgan Press
- Lecky, William Edward Hartpole. History of Ireland in the Eighteenth Century (6 vol. 1892)
  - vol 2, 1760–1789
  - vol 3, 1790–96
  - vol 4, 1796–98
  - vol 5, 1798–1801
  - vol 6, international affairs of 1790s
- Lee, J. "Grattan's Parliament'." in Brian Farrell, ed., The Irish Parliamentary Tradition (Dublin, 1973) pp: 149+
- McDowell, R. B. (2001). Grattan A Life. Lilliput Press. ISBN 1-901866-72-6.
- McHugh, Roger Joseph. Henry Grattan (Talbot Press, 1936).
- Mansergh D. Grattan's failure Parliamentary Opposition and the People in Ireland (2005 Irish Academic Press); Review of Grattan's Failure
- O'Brien, Gerard. "The Grattan Mystique." Eighteenth-Century Ireland/Iris an dá chultúr (1986): 177–194. in JSTOR

=== Primary sources ===
- Grattan, Henry, ed. The Speeches of the Right Honourable Henry Grattan: In the Irish, and in the Imperial Parliament (1822) online
  - Grattan's Speeches (ed by H. Grattan, junr., 1822);
- Henry Grattan jnr. Memoirs of the Life and Times of the Right Hon. H. Grattan Vol. 1 Vol.2(5 vols., London, 1839–1846);

=== Other sources ===
Parliament of Ireland
Preceded by Francis Caulfeild; Sir Annesley Stewart, 6th Bt	Member of Parliament for Charlemont; 1775–1790; With: Sir Annesley Stewart, 6th Bt	Succeeded by Richard Sheridan; Sir Annesley Stewart, 6th Bt
Preceded by Nathaniel Warren; Travers Hartley	Member of Parliament for Dublin City; 1790–1798; With: Lord Henry FitzGerald	Succeeded by Arthur Wolfe; John Claudius Beresford
Preceded by Daniel Gahan; William Henry Armstrong	Member of Parliament for Wicklow; 1800–1801; With: William Henry Armstrong	Succeeded by Parliament of the United Kingdom
Parliament of the United Kingdom
Preceded by Bryan Cooke; Charles Lawrence Dundas	Member of Parliament for Malton; 1805–1806; With: Bryan Cooke	Succeeded by Bryan Cooke; Viscount Milton
Preceded by John La Touche; Robert Shaw	Member of Parliament for Dublin City; 1806–1820; With: Robert Shaw	Succeeded by Robert Shaw; Thomas Ellis
