= Dublin City (UK Parliament constituency) =

UK parliamentary constituency in Ireland, 1801–1885

- Former borough constituency for the House of Commons
- County: Dublin
- Borough: Dublin

1801–1885
- Seats: 2
- Created from: Dublin City
- Replaced by: College Green; Dublin Harbour; St Stephen's Green; St Patrick's

Dublin City was an Irish borough constituency in the House of Commons of the United Kingdom of Great Britain and Ireland. It comprised the city of Dublin in the county of Dublin, and was represented by two Members of Parliament from its creation in 1801 until 1885.

In 1885, Dublin City was split into four divisions which were separate single-member constituencies: College Green, Dublin Harbour, St Stephen's Green and St Patrick's.

== History ==
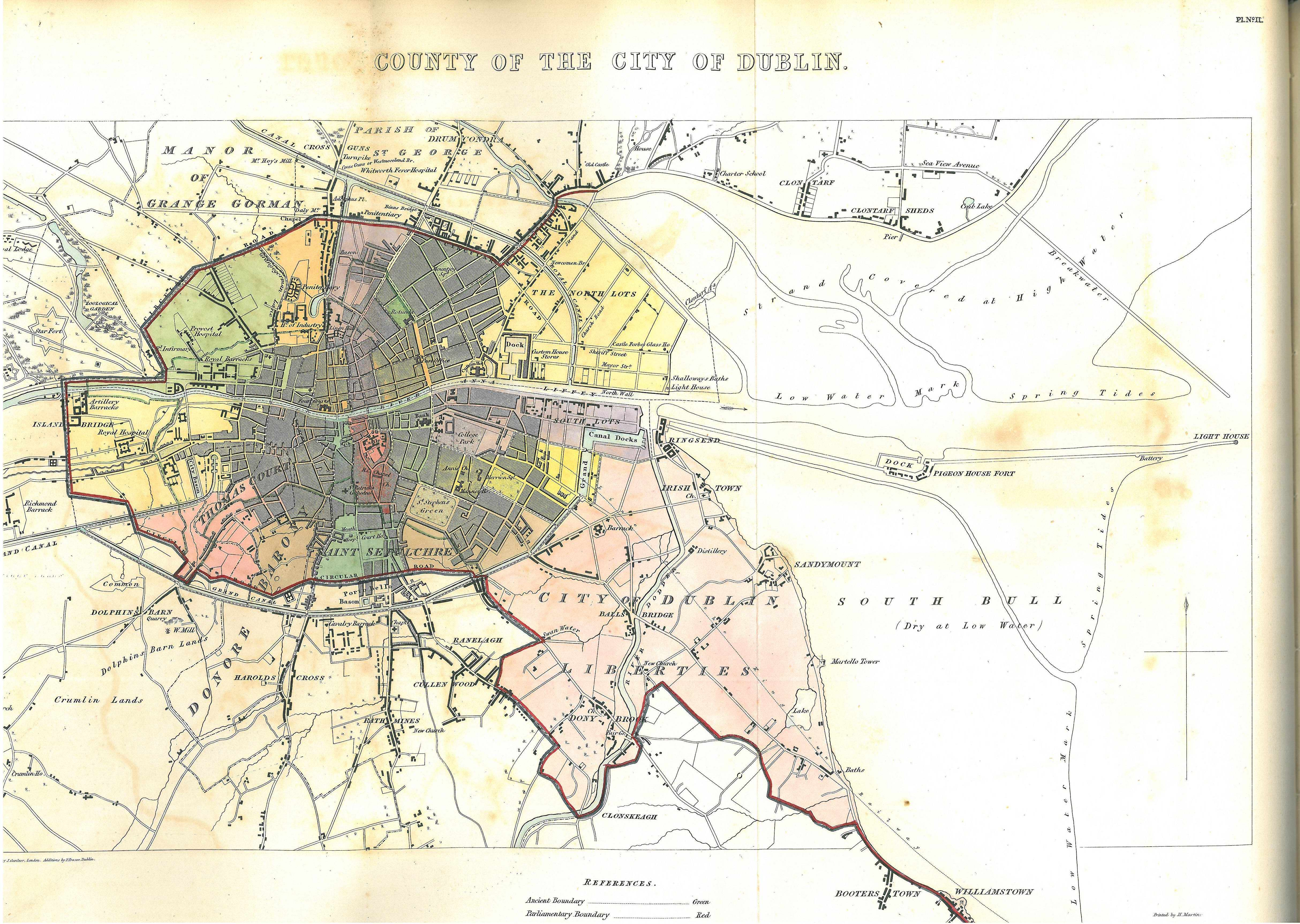
The red border delineates the border of the Dublin City constituency between 1832 and 1840.

Under article 4 of the Acts of Union 1800, Dublin was one of two boroughs which had retained two seats among the initial 100 Irish MPs sitting in the House of Commons of the United Kingdom from 1801.

A report into the boundaries was undertaken in 1831. The report found that the Circular Road was "in a popular sense, generally regarded as the Boundary of the Town". The Parliamentary Boundaries (Ireland) Act 1832 defined the boundaries of the parliamentary borough as:

The County of the City of Dublin, and such Parts of the County at large as lie within the Circular Road.

Under the Redistribution of Seats Act 1885, the representation of the parliamentary borough was increased to 4 members, and it was divided into four divisions: College Green, Dublin Harbour, St Stephen's Green and St Patrick's.

== Profile ==
The city of Dublin was accounted a county of itself, although it remained connected with County Dublin for certain purposes. A Topographical Directory of Ireland (1837), describes the parliamentary history of the city:

The city returns two members to the Imperial parliament; the right of election, formerly vested in the corporation, freemen, and 40s. freeholders, has been extended to the £10 householders, and £20 and £10 leaseholders for the respective terms of 14 and 20 years, by the act of the 2nd of William IV., cap. 88. The number of voters registered at the first general election under that act was 7041, of which number, 5126 voted. The limits of the city, for electoral purposes, include an area of 3538 statute acres, the boundaries of which are minutely detailed in the Appendix; the number of freemen is about 3500, of whom 2500 are resident and 1000 non-resident, and the number of £10 houses is 16,000 : the sheriffs are the returning officers.

== Members of Parliament ==
Year	1st Member	1st Party	2nd Member	2nd Party
1801, 1 January	John Claudius Beresford	Tory	George Ogle	Tory
1802, 21 July	John Claudius Beresford	Tory	John La Touche	Whig
1804, 31 March	Sir Robert Shaw, Bt	Tory	John La Touche	Whig
1806, 19 November	Sir Robert Shaw, Bt	Tory	Henry Grattan	Whig
1820, 30 June	Sir Robert Shaw, Bt	Tory	Thomas Ellis	Tory
1826, 12 June	Henry Grattan Jnr	Whig	George Moore	Tory
1830, 4 August	Frederick Shaw	Tory	George Moore	Tory
1831, 19 May	Robert Harty	Whig	Louis Perrin	Whig
1832, 18 August (Note: The 1832 by-election was the last contest in Ireland for the Unreformed House of Commons.)	Frederick Shaw	Tory	Viscount Ingestre	Tory
1832, 22 December	Daniel O'Connell	Repeal Association	Edward Southwell Ruthven	Repeal Association
1836, 16 May	George Alexander Hamilton	Conservative	John Beattie West	Conservative
1837, 5 August	Daniel O'Connell	Repeal Association	Robert Hutton	Whig
1841, 10 July	John Beattie West	Conservative	Sir Edward Grogan, Bt	Conservative
1842, 29 January	William Henry Gregory	Conservative	Sir Edward Grogan, Bt	Conservative
1847, 7 August	John Reynolds	Repeal Association	Sir Edward Grogan, Bt	Conservative
1852, 12 July	John Vance	Conservative	Sir Edward Grogan, Bt	Conservative
1865, 17 July	Sir Benjamin Guinness, Bt	Conservative	Jonathan Pim	Liberal
1868, 1 June	Sir Arthur Guinness, Bt	Conservative	Jonathan Pim	Liberal
1870, 18 August	Sir Dominic Corrigan, Bt	Liberal	Jonathan Pim	Liberal
1874, 6 February	Sir Arthur Guinness, Bt	Conservative	Maurice Brooks	Home Rule League
1880, 5 April	Robert Dyer Lyons	Liberal	Maurice Brooks	Home Rule League
1882	Robert Dyer Lyons	Liberal	Maurice Brooks	Irish Parliamentary
1885	Constituency abolished			

== Elections ==
From 1832 (when registers of electors were first prepared) a turnout figure is given, for the percentage of the registered electors who voted. If the number of registered electors eligible to take part in a contested election is unknown, then the last known electorate figure is used to calculate an estimated turnout. If the numbers of registered electors and electors taking part in the poll are known, an exact turnout figure is calculated. In two-member elections (in which an elector could cast one or two votes as he chose), where the exact number of electors participating is unknown, an estimated turnout figure is given. This is calculated by dividing the total number of votes cast by two. To the extent that electors used only one of their votes the estimated turnout figure is an underestimate.

=== Elections in the 1800s ===
General election 21 July 1802: Dublin City 2 seats 15 day poll
Party	Candidate	Votes	%	±%
Tory	John Claudius Beresford	1,965	35.34	
Whig	John La Touche	1,673	30.08	
Tory	George Ogle	1,281	23.04	
Whig	Jonah Barrington	642	11.54	
Majority		392	7.04	
Turnout		5,561		
Tory win (new seat)				
Whig win (new seat)				

Dublin by-election, 31 March 1804 Caused by resignation of Beresford
Party	Candidate	Votes	%	±%
Tory	Sir Robert Shaw, Bt	Unopposed	N/A	N/A
Tory hold				

General election 19 November 1806: Dublin City 2 seats 8 day poll
Party	Candidate	Votes	%	±%
Whig	Henry Grattan	1,675	34.64	
Tory	Sir Robert Shaw, Bt	1,638	33.88	
Whig	John La Touche	1,522	31.48	
Majority		116	2.40	
Turnout		4,835		
Whig hold		Swing		
Tory hold		Swing		

General election 15 May 1807: Dublin City 2 seats
Party	Candidate	Votes	%	±%
Whig	Henry Grattan	Unopposed	N/A	N/A
Tory	Sir Robert Shaw, Bt	Unopposed	N/A	N/A

=== Elections in the 1810s ===
General election 19 October 1812: Dublin City 2 seats
Party	Candidate	Votes	%	±%
Whig	Henry Grattan	Unopposed	N/A	N/A
Tory	Sir Robert Shaw, Bt	Unopposed	N/A	N/A

General election 30 June 1818: Dublin City 2 seats
Party	Candidate	Votes	%	±%
Whig	Henry Grattan	Unopposed	N/A	N/A
Tory	Sir Robert Shaw, Bt	Unopposed	N/A	N/A

=== Elections in the 1820s ===
General election 16 March 1820: Dublin City 2 seats
Party	Candidate	Votes	%	±%
Whig	Henry Grattan	Unopposed	N/A	N/A
Tory	Sir Robert Shaw, Bt	Unopposed	N/A	N/A

Dublin by-election, 30 June 1820 Caused by the death of Grattan 6 day poll
Party	Candidate	Votes	%	±%
Tory	Thomas Ellis	1,137	59.03	N/A
Whig	Henry Grattan Jnr	789	40.97	N/A
Majority		348	18.06	N/A
Turnout		1,926		N/A
Tory gain from Whig		Swing		

General election 12 June 1826: Dublin City 2 seats
Party	Candidate	Votes	%	±%
Whig	Henry Grattan Jnr	Unopposed	N/A	N/A
Tory	George Moore	Unopposed	N/A	N/A

=== Elections in the 1830s ===
General election 1830: Dublin City
Party	Candidate	Votes	%
Tory	George Moore	1,852	41.6
Tory	Frederick Shaw	1,579	35.5
Whig	Henry Grattan Jnr	1,014	22.8
Tory	Edward Cottingham	5	0.1
Whig	John Milley Doyle	2	0.0
Majority		565	12.7
Turnout		2,803	c. 49.2
Registered electors		c. 5,700	
Tory hold			
Tory gain from Whig			

General election 1831: Dublin City
Party	Candidate	Votes	%	±%
Whig	Robert Harty	1,943	27.7	+4.9
Whig	Louis Perrin	1,935	27.6	+27.6
Tory	George Moore	1,568	22.4	−19.2
Tory	Frederick Shaw	1,562	22.3	−13.2
Majority		367	5.2	N/A
Turnout		3,613	c. 63.4	c. +14.2
Registered electors		c. 5,700		
Whig gain from Tory		Swing	+10.6	
Whig gain from Tory		Swing	+21.9	

On petition, Harty and Perrin were unseated, causing a by-election.

By-election, 18 August 1831: Dublin City
Party	Candidate	Votes	%	±%
Tory	Frederick Shaw	1,292	28.3	+6.0
Tory	Viscount Ingestre	1,250	27.4	+5.0
Whig	David Charles LaTouche	1,053	23.1	−4.6
Whig	Michael O'Loghlen	937	20.5	−7.1
Whig	Marcus Costello	28	0.6	New
Majority		197	4.3	−0.9
Turnout		c. 2,280	c. 40.0	c. −23.4
Registered electors		c. 5,700		
Tory gain from Whig		Swing	+5.9	
Tory gain from Whig		Swing	+5.4	

General election 1832: Dublin City
Party	Candidate	Votes	%	±%
Repeal	Daniel O'Connell	3,411	32.6	New
Repeal	Edward Southwell Ruthven	3,352	32.0	New
Tory	John Beattie West	1,862	17.8	−4.6
Tory	George Rich	1,837	17.6	−4.7
Majority		1,490	14.2	N/A
Turnout		5,273	75.2	c. +11.8
Registered electors		7,008		
Repeal gain from Whig		Swing		
Repeal gain from Whig		Swing		

General election 1835: Dublin City
Party	Candidate	Votes	%	±%
Repeal (Whig)	Daniel O'Connell	2,678	26.2	−6.4
Repeal (Whig)	Edward Southwell Ruthven	2,630	25.7	−6.3
Conservative	George Alexander Hamilton	2,461	24.1	+6.3
Conservative	John Beattie West	2,455	24.0	+6.4
Majority		169	1.6	−12.6
Turnout		5,101	71.7	−3.5
Registered electors		7,113		
Repeal hold		Swing	−6.4	
Repeal hold		Swing	−6.3	

- On petition, O'Connell and Ruthven were unseated and Hamilton and West were declared elected on 16 May 1836

General election 1837: Dublin City
Party	Candidate	Votes	%	±%
Repeal (Whig)	Daniel O'Connell	3,556	25.4	−0.8
Whig	Robert Hutton	3,542	25.3	−0.4
Conservative	George Alexander Hamilton	3,467	24.7	+0.6
Conservative	John Beattie West	3,461	24.7	+0.7
Turnout		6,972	61.1	−10.6
Registered electors		11,409		
Majority		14	0.1	−1.5
Repeal hold		Swing	−0.7	
Majority		75	0.6	N/A
Whig gain from Repeal		Swing	−0.5	

=== Elections in the 1840s ===
General election 1841: Dublin City
Party	Candidate	Votes	%	±%
Conservative	John Beattie West	3,860	25.6	+0.9
Conservative	Edward Grogan	3,839	25.5	+0.8
Repeal	Daniel O'Connell	3,692	24.5	−0.9
Whig	Robert Hutton	3,662	24.3	−1.0
Majority		147	1.0	N/A
Turnout		7,919	64.6	+3.5
Registered electors		12,264		
Conservative gain from Repeal		Swing	+0.9	
Conservative gain from Whig		Swing	+0.9	

West's death caused a by-election.

By-election, 29 January 1842: Dublin City
Party	Candidate	Votes	%	±%
Conservative	William Henry Gregory	3,825	52.7	+1.6
Whig	Viscount Morpeth	3,435	47.3	+23.0
Majority		390	5.4	+4.4
Turnout		7,260	59.2	−5.4
Registered electors		12,264 (1841 figure)		
Conservative hold		Swing	−10.7	

General election 1847: Dublin City
Party	Candidate	Votes	%	±%
Conservative	Edward Grogan	3,353	34.5	+9.0
Repeal	John Reynolds	3,229	33.3	+8.8
Peelite	William Henry Gregory	3,125	32.2	N/A
Turnout		4,854 (est)	24.8 (est)	−39.8
Registered electors		19,562		
Majority		124	1.2	+0.2
Conservative hold		Swing	−0.4	
Majority		104	1.1	N/A
Repeal gain from Conservative		Swing	+0.4	

On petition, the poll was amended and 92 votes were struck off Reynolds, although this did not cause him to be declared unelected.

=== Elections in the 1850s ===
General election 1852: Dublin City
Party	Candidate	Votes	%	±%
Conservative	Edward Grogan	4,531	37.8	+20.5
Conservative	John Vance	4,429	37.0	+19.7
Independent Irish	John Reynolds	3,019	25.2	−8.1
Majority		1,410	11.8	+11.6
Turnout		7,499 (est)	66.4 (est)	+39.6
Registered electors		11,290		
Conservative hold		Swing	+12.3	
Conservative gain from Repeal		Swing	+11.9	

General election 1857: Dublin City
Party	Candidate	Votes	%	±%
Conservative	Edward Grogan	3,767	26.5	−11.3
Conservative	John Vance	3,711	26.1	−10.9
Whig	Francis William Brady	3,405	23.9	−1.3
Whig	John Reynolds	3,348	23.5	New
Majority		306	2.2	−9.6
Turnout		7,116 (est)	71.8 (est)	+5.4
Registered electors		9,905		
Conservative hold		Swing	−11.2	
Conservative hold		Swing	−11.0	

General election 1859: Dublin City
Party	Candidate	Votes	%	±%
Conservative	Sir Edward Grogan	4,251	26.0	−0.5
Conservative	John Vance	4,224	25.9	−0.2
Liberal	Francis William Brady	3,976	24.3	+0.4
Liberal	Alexander McCarthy	3,881	23.8	+0.3
Majority		248	1.6	−0.6
Turnout		8,166 (est)	78.8	+7.0
Registered electors		10,367		
Conservative hold		Swing	−0.4	
Conservative hold		Swing	−0.3	

=== Elections in the 1860s ===
General election 1865: Dublin City
Party	Candidate	Votes	%	±%
Conservative	Benjamin Guinness	4,739	35.2	+9.2
Liberal	Jonathan Pim	4,653	34.6	−13.5
Conservative	John Vance	4,073	30.2	+4.3
Turnout		9,059 (est)	84.9 (est)	+6.1
Registered electors		10,666		
Majority		86	0.6	−1.0
Conservative hold		Swing	+8.0	
Majority		580	4.4	N/A
Liberal gain from Conservative		Swing	−13.5	

Guinness' death caused a by-election.

==== Transparency of results ====
Following the election, a publication was printed listing the names of those who had voted, and for whom. The listing was categorised by the seventeen individual wards and districts of Dublin, and a further category solely reserved for the Freemen of Dublin. A similar publication was produced for the voters in the wider County of Dublin.

By-election, 1 June 1868: Dublin City
Party	Candidate	Votes	%	±%
Conservative	Sir Arthur Guinness	Unopposed		
Registered electors				
Conservative hold				

General election 1868: Dublin City
Party	Candidate	Votes	%	±%
Conservative	Sir Arthur Guinness	5,587	25.4	−9.8
Liberal	Jonathan Pim	5,586	25.4	+8.1
Conservative	David Plunket	5,452	24.8	−5.4
Liberal	Sir Dominic Corrigan, Bt	5,379	24.4	+7.1
Turnout		11,002 (est)	85.3 (est)	+0.4
Registered electors		12,899		
Majority		1	0.0	−0.6
Conservative hold		Swing	−8.5	
Majority		134	0.6	−3.8
Liberal hold		Swing	+6.8	

=== Elections in the 1870s ===
On petition, Guinness was unseated.

By-election, 18 Aug 1870: Dublin City
Party	Candidate	Votes	%	±%
Liberal	Sir Dominic Corrigan, Bt	4,468	56.5	+6.7
Home Rule	Edward King-Harman	3,444	43.5	New
Majority		1,024	13.0	N/A
Turnout		7,912	61.3	−24.0
Registered electors		12,899		
Liberal gain from Conservative		Swing		

General election 1874: Dublin City
Party	Candidate	Votes	%	±%
Conservative	Sir Arthur Guinness	5,213	41.7	−8.5
Home Rule	Maurice Brooks	4,838	38.7	N/A
Liberal	Jonathan Pim	1,937	15.5	−34.3
Home Rule	Edward Fox	515	4.1	N/A
Turnout		6,252 (est)	51.8 (est)	−33.5
Registered electors		12,067		
Majority		375	3.0	+3.0
Conservative hold		Swing	+12.9	
Majority		2,901	23.2	N/A
Home Rule gain from Liberal		Swing		

=== Elections in the 1880s ===
General election 1880: Dublin City
Party	Candidate	Votes	%	±%
Home Rule	Maurice Brooks	5,763	26.3	−12.4
Liberal	Robert Dyer Lyons	5,647	25.8	+10.3
Conservative	Sir Arthur Guinness	5,446	24.9	+4.0
Conservative	James Stirling	5,059	23.1	+2.2
Turnout		10,958 (est)	80.6 (est)	+28.8
Registered electors		13,599		
Majority		116	0.5	−22.7
Home Rule hold		Swing	−8.2	
Majority		201	0.9	N/A
Liberal gain from Conservative		Swing	+4.1	

== Sources ==
- The Parliaments of England by Henry Stooks Smith (1st edition published in three volumes 1844–50), 2nd edition edited (in one volume) by F.W.S. Craig (Political Reference Publications 1973)
- Walker, B.M., ed. (1978). Parliamentary Election Results in Ireland, 1801–1922. Royal Irish Academy.
- Leigh Rayment's Historical List of MPs – Constituencies beginning with "D" (part 3)
