= Robert Harty =

British politician (1779–1832)

Sir Robert Way Harty, 1st Baronet (27 December 1779 – 10 October 1832) was a British politician and Whig Member of Parliament representing Dublin City for a few months in 1831.

He was born the youngest son of Timothy Harty (d. 1799) of Kilkenny and Mary, the daughter of John Lockington.

Harty was appointed High Sheriff of Dublin City for 1811 to 1812 and was the Lord Mayor of Dublin when elected to Parliament. He was created 1st Baronet (Harty of Prospect House, Dublin) in 1831. The formal creation, according to Leigh Rayment, was 30 September 1831, but it must have been known about earlier as The Times (of London) in its edition of 23 May 1831 reporting the result of the Dublin election, referred to Harty as a Baronet.

In the UK General Election of 1831 Harty was, on 19 May 1831, declared elected to one of the two seats for Dublin City. The defeated Tory candidates presented an election petition against Harty and his colleague Louis Perrin. The Whig MPs were unseated in August and a new election ordered. Harty was never again to stand for election to Parliament.

He was married to Elizabeth, the daughter of John Davis of Eden Park and Prospect House, Co. Dublin; by his wife, Mary, daughter of Charles Jones (d.1788) of Killincarrig House, Co. Wicklow. They had 4 sons and 3 daughters. He was succeeded in his title consecutively by his eldest son, Robert and his youngest son, Henry Lockington.

His daughter Emma Jane Adelaide (1828–1919) married George Henry Haigh DL JP (1829–1887) of The Shay, Halifax, and Grainsby Hall, Lincs in 1859. A Genealogical and Heraldic History of the Landed Gentry of Great Britain and Ireland, sixth edition, vol. I, Bernard Burke, Harrison, 1879, p. 707 The Haighs had made their fortune in the industrial revolution (as mill owners, merchants and bankers) and had entered the ranks of the landed gentry. In addition to estates in Yorkshire and Lincolnshire they owned a country house in Merionethshire called "Aber Iâ". This property was later made famous as Portmeirion by Sir Clough Williams-Ellis. Their eldest son was George Henry Caton Haigh (1860–1941).

== Sources ==
- Parliamentary Election Results in Ireland, 1801-1922, edited by B.M. Walker (Royal Irish Academy 1978)
- The Parliaments of England by Henry Stooks Smith (1st edition published in three volumes 1844–50), 2nd edition edited (in one volume) by F.W.S. Craig (Political Reference Publications 1973)
- "HARTY, Robert Way (1779-1832), of Merrion Square East, Dublin and Prospect House, Roebuck, co. Dublin". History of Parliament online.
- Leigh Rayment's list of baronets
- Leigh Rayment's Historical List of MPs

Parliament of the United Kingdom
Preceded by Sir Frederick Shaw, Bt; George Moore	Member of Parliament for Dublin City; 1831–1832; With: Louis Perrin	Succeeded by Sir Frederick Shaw, Bt; Viscount Ingestre
Baronetage of the United Kingdom
New creation	Baronet (of Prospect House); 1831–1832	Succeeded by Robert Harty
Civic offices
Preceded by Jacob West	Lord Mayor of Dublin; 1830–1831	Succeeded by Richard Smyth
