= Hearty (surname) =

Hearty is a surname of Irish origin, a variant of the surname Harty, which is an Anglicization of Gaelic Ó hAghartaigh and means 'descendant of Athartach or Artach', which mean 'noisy'. Notable people with the surname include:

- Hugh Hearty (1912–after 1939), Scottish professional footballer
- Paul Hearty (born 1978), Irish Gaelic footballer

== See also ==
- Harty (surname)
