= Henry Chetwynd-Talbot, 18th Earl of Shrewsbury =

British naval commander and Conservative politician (1803–1868)

Admiral The Right Honourable The Earl of Shrewsbury CB PC
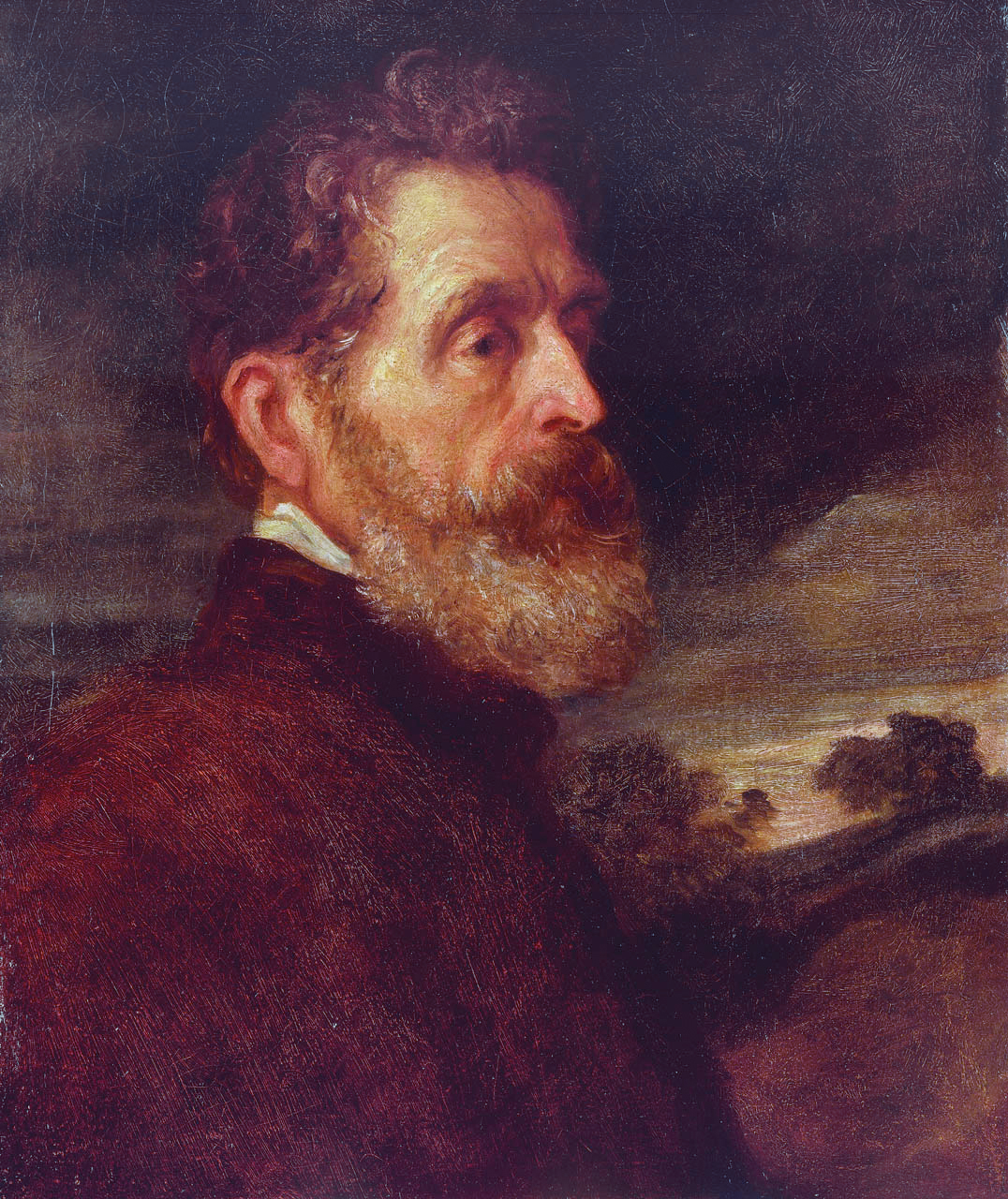
- Henry John Chetwynd, 18th Earl of Shrewsbury (George Frederic Watts), ca. 1865

Captain of the Honourable Corps of Gentlemen-at-Arms
- In office 26 February 1858 – 11 June 1859
- Monarch: Victoria
- Prime Minister: The Earl of Derby
- Preceded by: The Lord Foley
- Succeeded by: The Lord Foley

Personal details
- Born: 8 November 1803
- Died: 4 June 1868 (aged 64) Lacock
- Party: Conservative
- Spouse(s): Lady Sarah Beresford (1807–1884)
- Children: 8
- Parent(s): Charles Chetwynd-Talbot, 2nd Earl Talbot; Frances Thomasine Lambart

Henry John Chetwynd-Talbot, 18th Earl of Shrewsbury, 18th Earl of Waterford, 3rd Earl Talbot, CB, PC (8 November 1803 – 4 June 1868), styled Viscount Ingestre between 1826 and 1849 and known as the Earl Talbot between 1849 and 1858, was a British naval commander and Conservative politician.

== Background ==
Shrewsbury was the second but eldest surviving son of Charles Chetwynd-Talbot, 2nd Earl Talbot, by his marriage to Frances Thomasine, a daughter of Charles Lambart. He was styled Viscount Ingestre from the death of his elder brother in 1826 and succeeded his father as 3rd Earl Talbot in 1849. In 1860, following a long and expensive legal case in the House of Lords, and against the claims of three others (Lord Edmund Howard Talbot, infant son of the 14th Duke of Norfolk by whom he was represented, Princess Doria Pamphili (daughter of John, 16th Earl) and Major William Talbot (of Castle Talbot, County Wexford, a descendant of William, 4th Earl), he succeeded to the titles and estates (including Alton Towers) of a distant cousin and became 18th Earl of Shrewsbury and 18th Earl of Waterford.

== Military career ==
Talbot (as he then was) entered the Royal Navy in 1817. He commanded HMS Philomel at the Battle of Navarino, and was picked by Vice-Admiral Codrington to bring home the despatches announcing the victory. He was soon after promoted to captain. On 9 March 1831, his father, the Lord Lieutenant of Staffordshire, commissioned him a Lieutenant in the Staffordshire Yeomanry, which he gave up in 1833. On 2 June 1832 his father appointed him Lieutenant-Colonel of the King's Own Staffordshire Militia, which he resigned in early 1846.

He was promoted a rear-admiral in 1854 and a vice-admiral and admiral in 1865.

As Viscount Ingestre, while serving in the House of Commons, he was a leading supporter of the charlatan naval inventor Samuel Alfred Warner.

== Political career ==
Ingestre was returned to Parliament as one of two representatives for Hertford in 1830. In May of the following year he was elected for Armagh City, a seat he only held until August 1831, and then represented Dublin City until 1832. In 1832 he was once again returned for Hertford. However, the election was declared void on petition in 1833. He returned to the House of Commons as one of the two representatives for Staffordshire South in 1837, a seat he held until he succeeded his father in the Talbot earldom in 1849. After entering the House of Lords he served under the Earl of Derby as a lord-in-waiting (government whip in the House of Lords) in 1852 and as Captain of the Honourable Corps of Gentlemen-at-Arms from 1858 to 1859. In 1858 he was sworn of the Privy Council.

== Family ==
In 1828, while Lord Ingestre, he married Lady Sarah Elizabeth, daughter of Henry Beresford, 2nd Marquess of Waterford, by his marriage to Sarah Carpenter. They had four sons and four daughters:

- Charles John Chetwynd-Talbot, 19th Earl of Shrewsbury (13 Apr 1830 - 11 May 1877)
- Lady Victoria Susan Chetwynd-Talbot (27 Feb 1831 - 8 June 1856). Died unmarried.
- Admiral Walter Cecil Carpenter (27 March 1834 - 13 May 1904)
- Lady Constance Harriet Mahonesa Chetwynd-Talbot (15 June 1836 - 10 Oct 1901) married William Kerr, 8th Marquess of Lothian. They had no children.
- Lady Gertrude Frances Chetwynd-Talbot (21 Mar 1840 - 30 Sep 1906) married George Herbert, 13th Earl of Pembroke. They had no children.
- Sir Reginald Arthur James Chetwynd-Talbot (11 July 1841 - 15 Jan 1929)
- Lady Adelaide Chetwynd-Talbot (8 July 1844 - 16 Mar 1917) married Adelbert Brownlow-Cust, 3rd Earl Brownlow, in 1868. They had no children.
- Alfred Chetwynd-Talbot (14 Sep 1848 - 9 May 1913) married Emily Augusta Louisa de Grey, daughter of Thomas de Grey, 5th Baron Walsingham. They had three sons and two daughters.

Lord Shrewsbury died in June 1868, aged 64, and was succeeded in his titles by his eldest son Charles. The Countess of Shrewsbury survived her husband by sixteen years and died in October 1884, aged 76.

== Ancestry ==
Ancestry of Henry Chetwynd-Talbot, 18th Earl of Shrewsbury

8. Charles Talbot, 1st Baron Talbot
4. John Chetwynd-Talbot, 1st Earl Talbot
9. Catherine Chetwynd, Baroness Talbot
2. Charles Chetwynd-Talbot, 2nd Earl Talbot
10. Wills Hill, 1st Marquess of Downshire
5. Charlotte Hill, Countess Talbot
11. Margaretta FitzGerald, Marchioness of Downshire
1. Henry Chetwynd-Talbot, 18th Earl of Shrewsbury
12. Gustavas William Lambart, MP
6. Charles Lambart
13. Lady Thomasine Rochfort
3. Lady Frances Thomasine Lambart, Countess Talbot
14. James Lenox Naper Dutton
7. Frances Dutton
15. Jane Bond

== Notes ==
Parliament of the United Kingdom
Preceded by Thomas Byron; Thomas Slingsby Duncombe	Member of Parliament for Hertford; 1830–1831; With: Thomas Slingsby Duncombe	Succeeded by Thomas Slingsby Duncombe; John Currie
Preceded by Henry Goulburn	Member of Parliament for Armagh City; 1831	Succeeded by Sir John William Head Brydges
Preceded by Robert Way Harty; Louis Perrin	Member of Parliament for Dublin City; 1831; With: Frederick Shaw	Succeeded by Daniel O'Connell; Edward Southwell Ruthven
Preceded by Thomas Slingsby Duncombe; John Currie	Member of Parliament for Hertford; 1832–1833; With: Viscount Mahon (election declared void 1833)	Succeeded by Viscount Mahon; William Francis Cowper
Preceded by Sir John Wrottesley; Sir Francis Holyoake-Goodricke	Member of Parliament for Staffordshire South; 1837–1849; With: George Anson	Succeeded by George Anson; Viscount Lewisham
Political offices
Preceded by The Lord Foley	Captain of the Honourable Corps of Gentlemen-at-Arms; 1858–1859	Succeeded by The Lord Foley
Honorary titles
Preceded by The Earl of Shrewsbury	Lord High Steward of Ireland; 1856–1868	Succeeded by The Earl of Shrewsbury
Peerage of England
Preceded by Bertram Talbot	Earl of Shrewsbury; 1858–1868	Succeeded by Charles John Chetwynd-Talbot
Peerage of Ireland
Preceded by Bertram Talbot	Earl of Waterford; 1858–1868	Succeeded by Charles John Chetwynd-Talbot
Peerage of Great Britain
Preceded by Charles Chetwynd-Talbot	Earl Talbot; 1849–1868	Succeeded by Charles John Chetwynd-Talbot
