= Harty baronets =

Extinct baronetcy in the Baronetage of the United Kingdom

Escutcheon of the Harty baronets of Prospect House

The Harty Baronetcy, of Prospect House in Roebuck in the County of Dublin, was a title in the Baronetage of the United Kingdom. It was created on 30 September 1831 for Robert Harty, Lord Mayor of Dublin. The title became extinct on the death of the fourth Baronet in 1939.

== Harty baronets, of Prospect House (1831) ==
- Sir Robert Way Harty, 1st Baronet (1779–1832)
- Sir Robert Harty, 2nd Baronet (1815–1902)
- Sir Henry Lockington Harty, 3rd Baronet (1826–1913)
- Sir Lionel Lockington Harty, 4th Baronet (1864–1939)

Baronetage of the United Kingdom
Preceded by Gibson-Craig baronets	Harty baronets of Prospect House; 30 September 1831	Succeeded by Heygate baronets
