= Bushy Park, Dublin =

Public park in Dublin, Ireland

Bushy Park
- Páirc na dTor
- Location within Dublin Location within Ireland
- Interactive map of Bushy Park
- Type: Municipal
- Location: Dublin, Ireland
- Coordinates: 53°18′6″N 6°17′29″W
- Area: 20.5 hectares (0.205 km^{2}; 0.079 sq mi)
- Operator: Dublin City Council
- Status: Open
- Website: www.dublincity.ie/main-menu-services-recreation-culture-dublin-city-parks-visit-park/bushy-park

Bushy Park (Irish: Páirc na dTor) is a large, 20.5-hectare (51-acre), suburban public park in Terenure, Dublin, Ireland.

== Location ==
Although situated mainly in Terenure, and listed by the city council with that address, it stretches to the borders of Rathfarnham and Templeogue. It is across the road from Terenure College boys' school and has several entrances. The River Dodder passes alongside it, within the Dodder Valley Linear Park, and the high rear wall of Bushy Park has several access points to the riverside.

== Attractions and activities ==
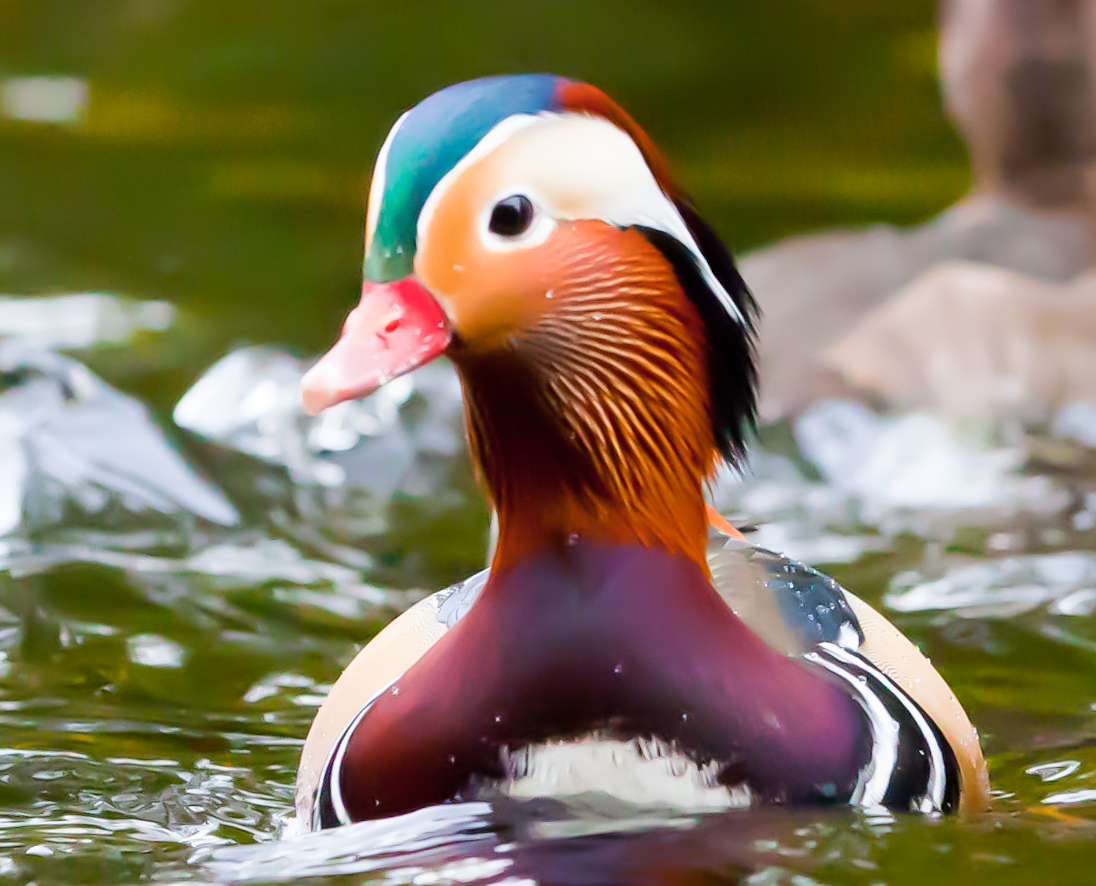
Mandarin drake in Bushy Park duckpond

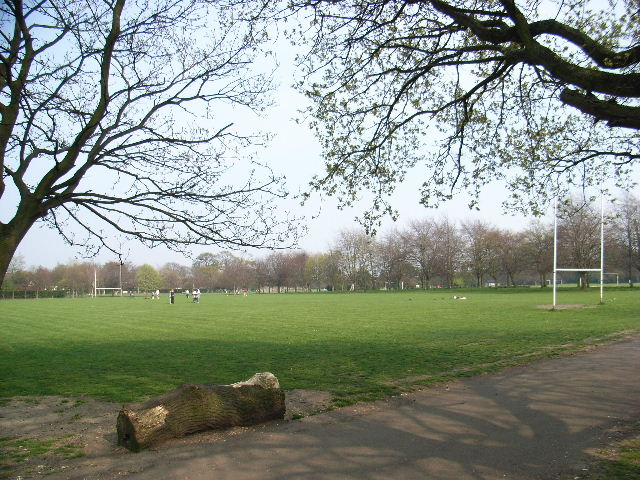
Playing fields in Bushy Park.

There is a children's playground, an extensive wooded area, with walks to the banks of the Dodder (with access either over a footbridge or across stepping stones to the Rathfarnham area), a woodland pond, a duck pond, and a recently reopened kiosk. In front of the duck pond is a high hill, and east of the pond is a starting point for the woodland walk, beside a small cascade. The park is a good place for birdwatching including swans and a variety of other waterfowl as well as sparrowhawk, treecreeper, and kingfisher.

The park has football fields, a skateboarding area and 11 tennis courts. Many sporting clubs and schools in the area use the park for recreational activities such as the Football Association of Ireland, Terenure Football Club (with schoolgirls, schoolboys, adult male and female teams), and Gaelic football club Templeogue Synge Street. Sportsworld running club are also based in the park, with their clubhouse located at the Terenure road entrance to the park. The Terenure Village Market operates in Bushy Park each Saturday afternoon. The market consists of a variety of stalls selling artisan foods, confectionery and more, along with occasional music performances.

== History ==
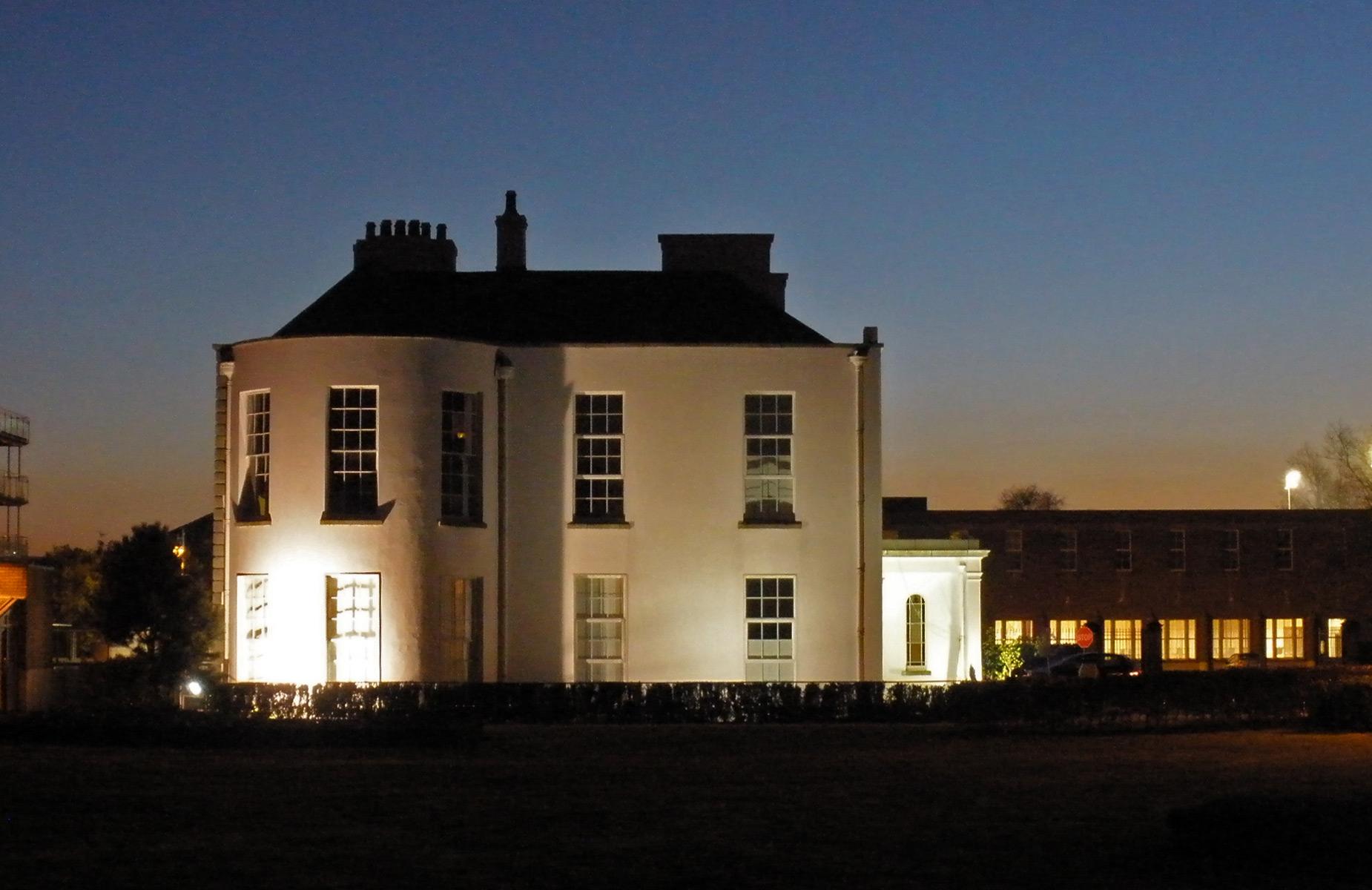
Bushy Park House at night

Bushy Park House was originally owned by Arthur Bushe of Dangan, County Kilkenny. He was a secretary to the Revenue Commissioners who built the house. The house was originally known as "Bushe's House" in 1700, and was situated on a site of four hectares. His daughter, Letitia Bushe also resided at the house.

John Hobson became the owner in 1772 and changed the name of the house to Bushy Park, possibly after Bushy Park in London. The third owner was Abraham Wilkinson who in 1791 added almost 40 extra hectares to this estate when his only daughter Maria married the Robert, 2nd baronet son of Sir Robert Shaw, 1st Baronet, Member of Parliament and Lord Mayor of Dublin. In 1796 he gave the house and 100 acre estate as a dowry to the couple. Bushy Park House became the seat of Sir Robert Shaw when he sold nearby Terenure House and 35 acre estate to Frederick Bourne in 1806. Today Terenure House forms the main building of Terenure College.

The Shaw family was connected with Bushy Park until they sold the house and grounds to Dublin Corporation in 1953.

The house and eight hectares of the grounds were then sold in 1955 by Dublin City Council to the Religious of Christian Education (an order of teaching Sisters founded in Normandy in 1817), where they established Our Lady's School for girls.

Dublin City Council re-acquired 2 acres (8,100 m^{2}) of woodland in 1992.

As of early 2008, there are plans to refurbish Bushy Park House.
