= Lorenzo Moore (cleric) =

New Zealand Anglican clergyman

Lorenzo Moore (1 September 1808 – 13 August 1894) was a notable New Zealand Anglican clergyman.

He was born in Blessington, County Wicklow, Ireland on 1 September 1808, a younger son of George Moore.

Moore was involved in a public dispute with the Bishop of Dunedin, Samuel Nevill; Moore was accused of holding Free Church services, though he rejected this label and claimed to be remedying what he termed 'ritualistic abuses'.

Moore's daughter Mary Elizabeth married John Eldon Gorst, in Geelong in 1860.
