= HMS Hearty =

Various ships of the Royal Navy have borne the name Hearty:

- HMS Hearty (1805), a 12-gun brig, sold in 1816
- HMS Hearty (1824), a Cherokee-class brig-sloop that became a Post Office Packet Service packet, sailing out of Falmouth, Cornwall. On 12 September 1827, she sailed from Falmouth for Jamaica, under the command of Lieutenant Jewry or Jawry, RN, and with 35 persons on board. She was sighted within a few days sail of Barbados, but never reached that island. She disappeared, believed to have foundered with all hands, in 1827.
- HMS Hearty (1854), a paddle tug, formerly Merry Monarch, purchased in 1855; broken up in 1876
- HMS Hearty (1885), a surveying ship
- HMS Hearty II (1907), a drifter, hired 1915-1919
- HMS Hearty (H57), an H-class destroyer
