= Terenure =

Suburb of Dublin, Ireland

Terenure Tír an Iúir (Irish)
- Suburb
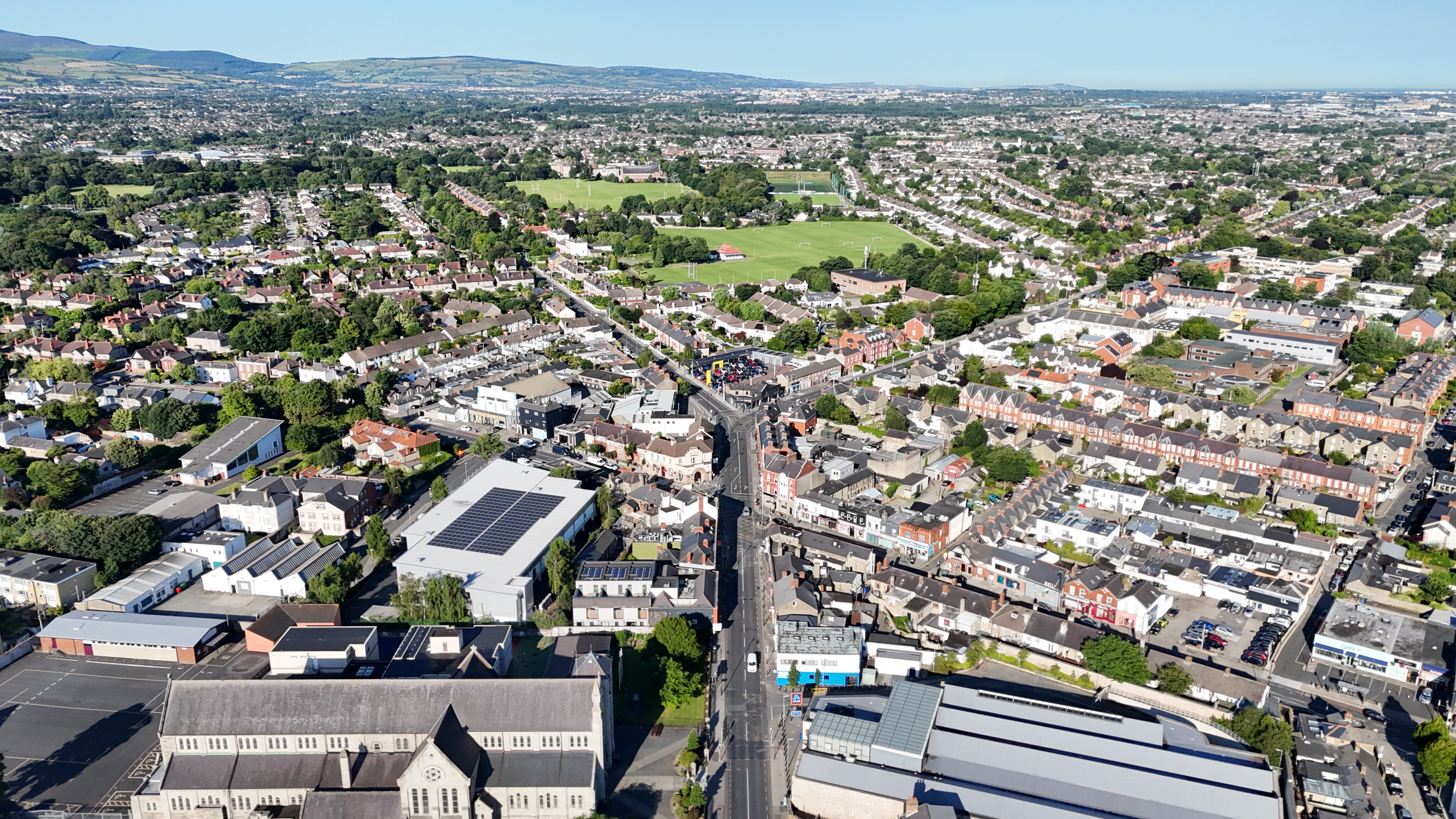
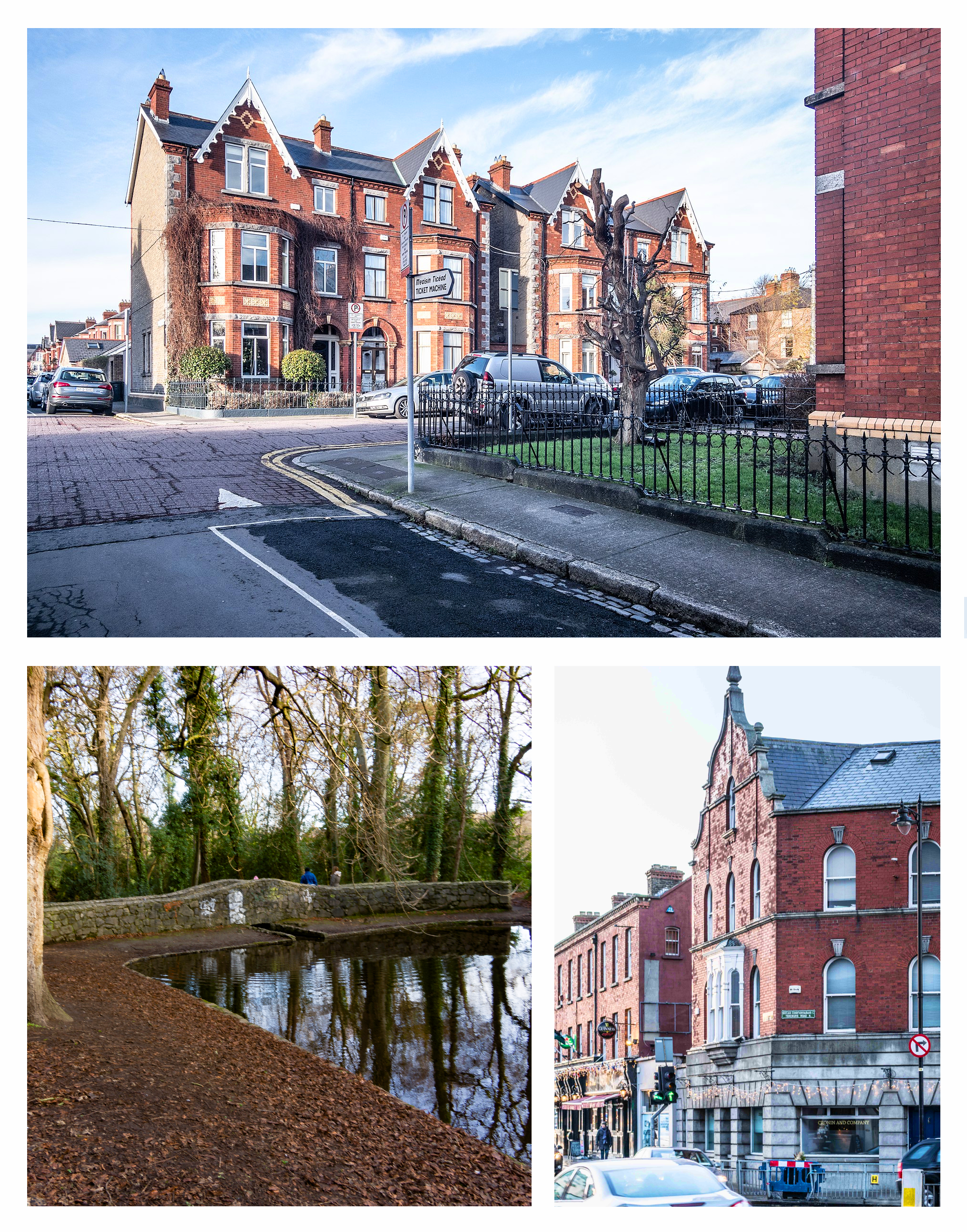
- Much of Terenure features red brick Victorian and Edwardian architecture. Bushy Park is a prominent local amenity.

- Location in Dublin Terenure (Dublin)
- Coordinates: 53°18′35″N 6°17′01″W
- Country: Ireland
- Province: Leinster
- County: County Dublin
- Council: Dublin City Council, South Dublin County Council
- Dáil Éireann: Dublin Bay South
- European Parliament: Dublin
- Elevation: 54 m (177 ft)

Population (2022)
  - Electoral division(s): 17,972
- Time zone: UTC+0 (WET)
  - Summer (DST): UTC-1 (IST (WEST))
- Irish Grid Reference: O143301

Terenure (Irish: Tír an Iúir, meaning 'land of the yew tree'), called Roundtown from around 1800-1870, is a middle class suburb of Dublin in Ireland. It is located in the city's D6 and D6W postal districts. The population of all electoral divisions labelled as Terenure was 17,972 as of the 2022 census.

== Location ==
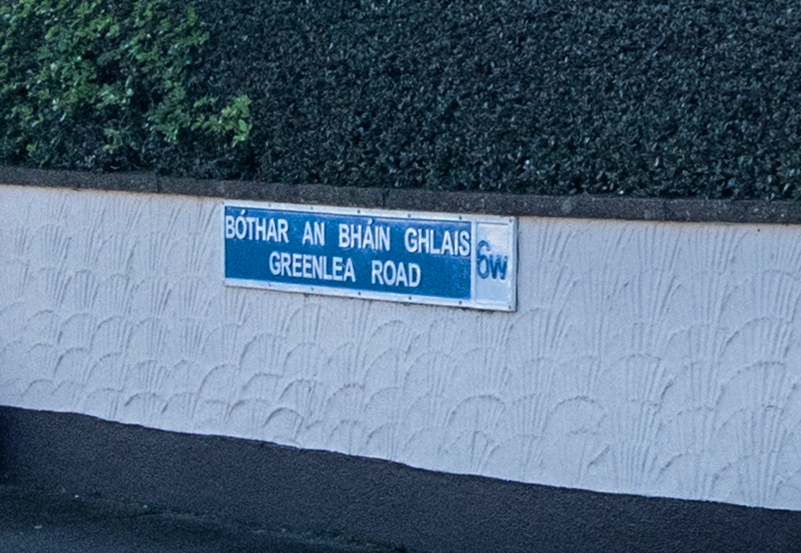
Terenure is in Dublin D6W

Terenure lies primarily in the administrative area of Dublin City Council but with parts falling within the administrative area of South Dublin County Council. It is located south of Harold's Cross and north of Rathfarnham, and also borders the suburbs of Templeogue, Rathgar, Kimmage and Perrystown.

== History ==
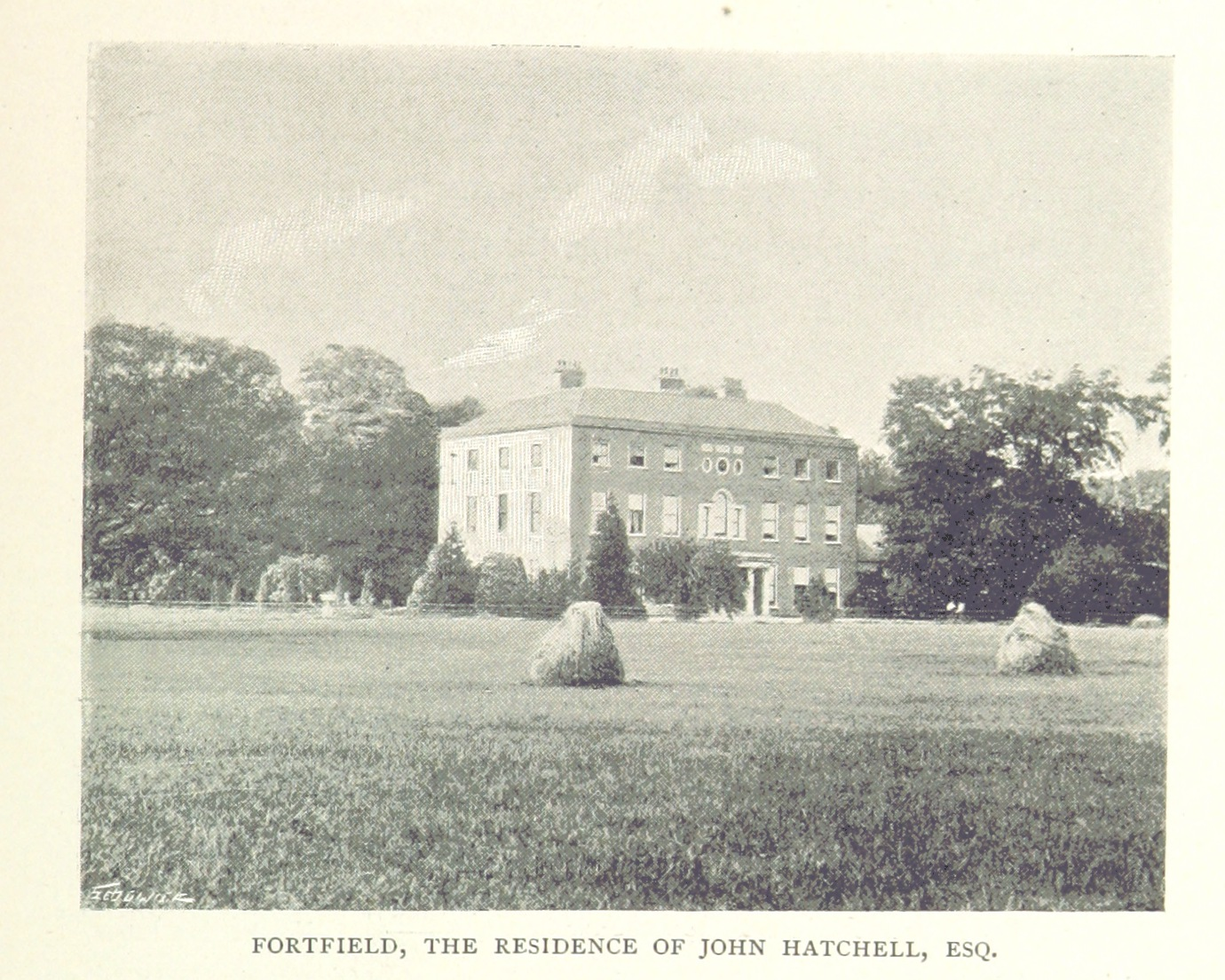
Fortfield House, Terenure

The earliest references to the area include a 12th century record of a grant (ref Grant CCA-DCc-ChAnt/C/1206 stored in the Canterbury Cathedral Archives), by which Henry II of England granted the lands of Terenure and Kimmage (Cheming) in Rathfarnham to Walter the goldsmith ('aurifauber') in 1175. It has not been established how the lands reverted to the crown within 40 years.

Terenure, Drimnagh and Kimmage, then well to the south of the city of Dublin, were granted to the Barnewell family by King John in 1215. The Barnewells gave some of the land to St John the Baptist Hospital outside Newgate, and Cromwell confiscated the remainder from them.

Later, Terenure passed through the hands of various owners. In the seventeenth century, the main landowners were the Deane family, whose most notable member was Joseph Deane, Chief Baron of the Irish Exchequer; his estates later passed to the Bourne family. Fortfield House was built around 1785 by a later Chief Baron, Barry Yelverton, 1st Viscount Avonmore. It was later owned by John Hatchell, the Attorney General for Ireland and passed by inheritance to the Perrin family. It was demolished in 1934.

On 2 January 1941, during World War II, the German Luftwaffe bombed Terenure, injuring seven people and destroying two houses.

== Education ==
Schools within the Terenure area include St. Joseph's BNS, St. Pius X BNS, St. Pius X GNS, Presentation Primary School, Presentation College, Terenure College and Our Lady's Secondary school.

== Religion ==
The Catholic parish church of St. Joseph in Terenure contains a stained glass window by Harry Clarke. St. Joseph's school is on the church grounds.

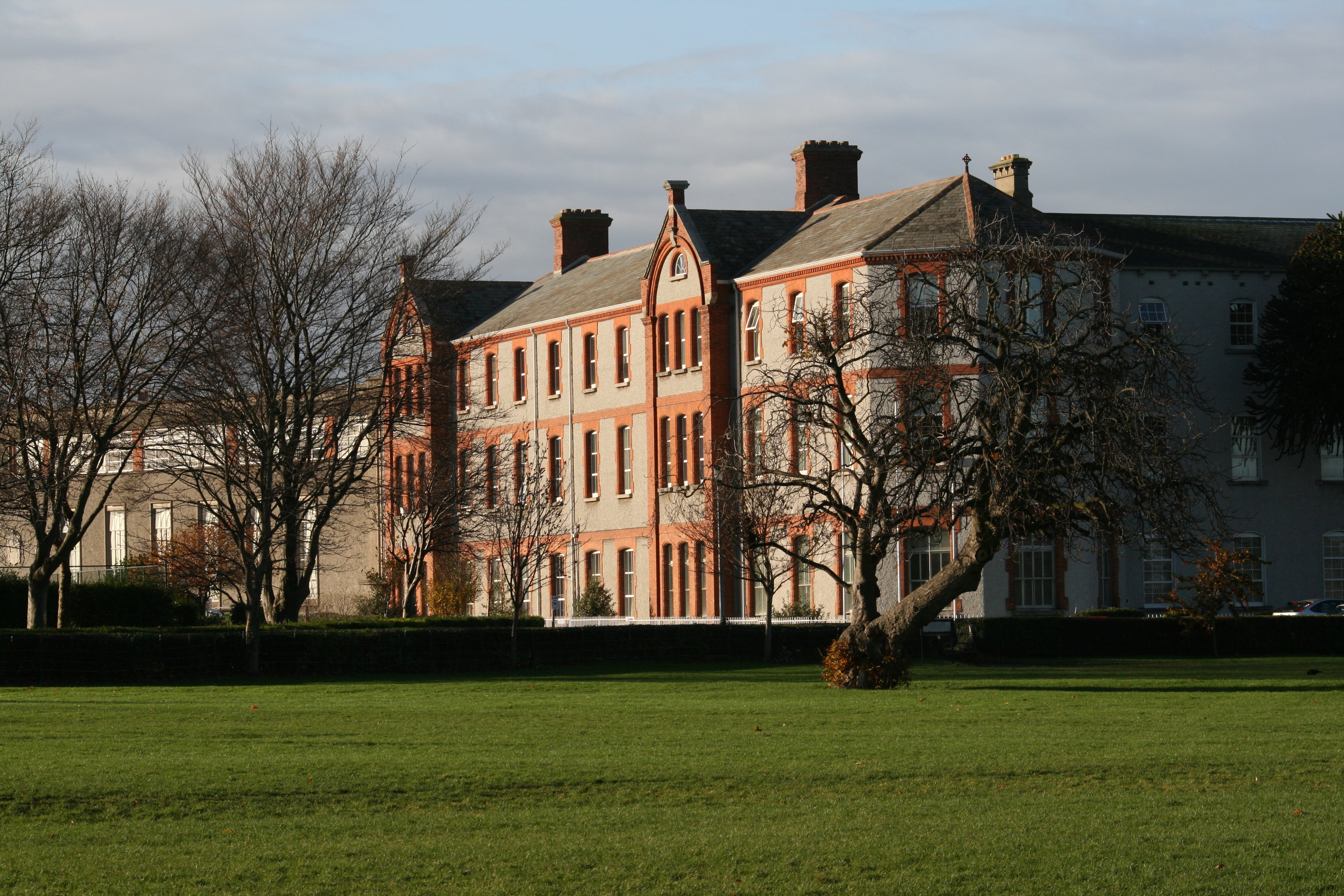
Terenure College, formerly Terenure House

Along with Rathgar and the area around Portobello, Terenure has traditionally been the home of much of Dublin's Jewish population. Terenure Synagogue, Dublin's main synagogue (Orthodox), is on Rathfarnham Road.

== Transport ==
The area, known as Roundtown until c. 1870, was within the scope of the Dublin, Rathmines, Rathfarnham and Rathcoole Railway Act 1864 that provided for the "making of railways from the City of Dublin to Rathmines, Rathgar, Roundtown, Rathfarnham, and Rathcoole".

Terenure Cross (also known as "Vaughan's Corner") (Note: Named after Vaughan's public house at the northeast corner of the crossroads.) was at one time a terminus for the Dublin tramways, and is mentioned in James Joyce's novel Ulysses (Episode 7, 'Aeolus'). There were three tram depots in Terenure at one time, the main tram depot for the number 15 Dublin United Transport Company (DUTC) trams on Terenure Road East, another DUTC depot for number 16 trams on Rathfarnham Road, and the terminus of the Dublin and Blessington Steam Tramway on Templeogue Road.

The modern tram system, the Luas, does not serve Terenure, but the bus routes serving it still include routes numbered 15, 15a and 16. These bus route numbers were originally allocated based on historic tram route numbers.

== People ==
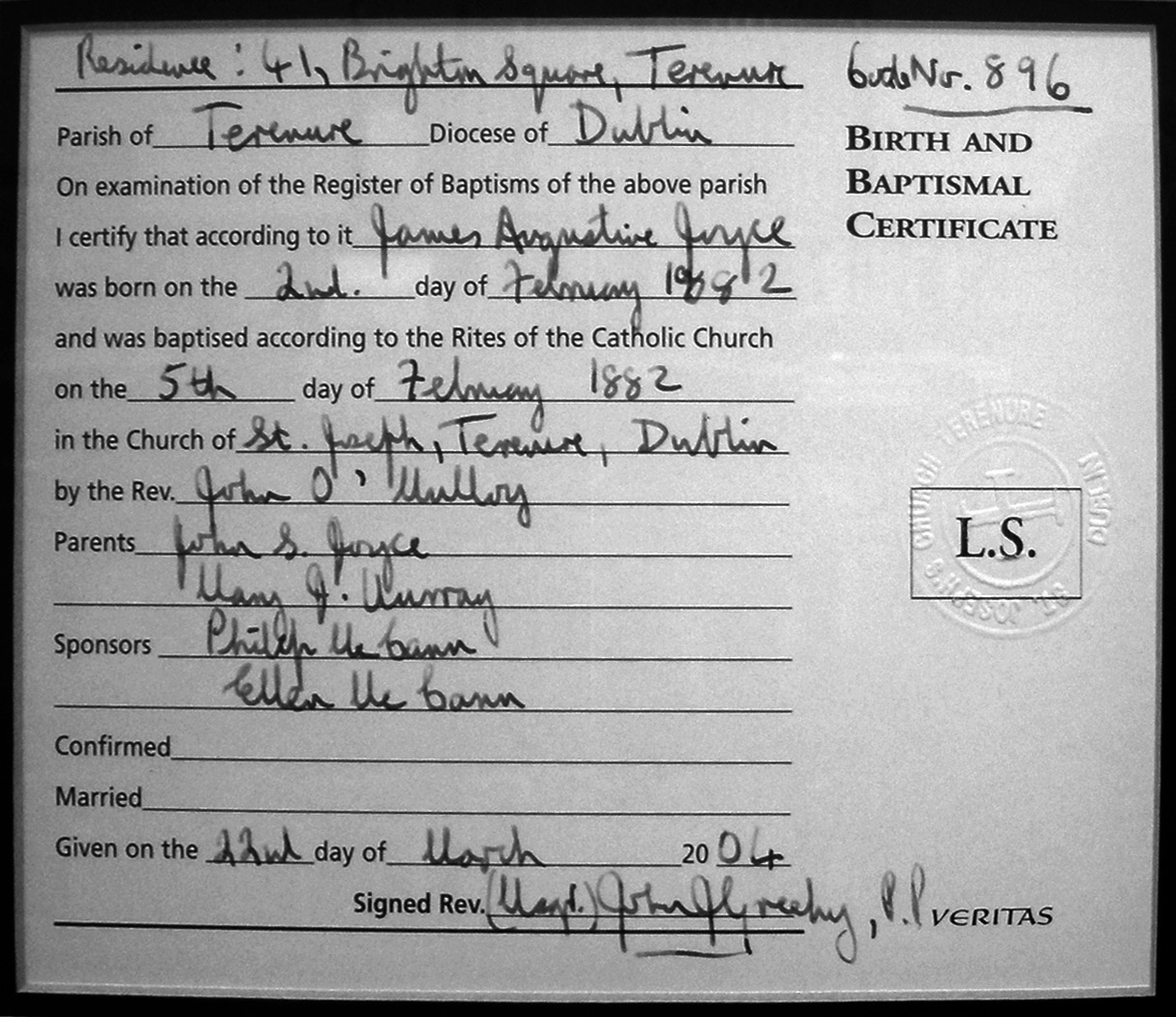
James Joyce's birth and baptismal certificate displayed in Terenure Library

The author James Joyce, who was born nearby at 41 Brighton Square in Rathgar on 2 February 1882, was baptised at St. Joseph's church on 5 February by Rev. John O'Mulloy. His mother, Mary Jane (May) Murray, was born 90 metres from the church at Terenure Cross in 1859 in the pub owned by her father, John Murray, called The Eagle House.

The village was home to actors, writers and musicians including the artist Mary Perrin, who grew up in Fortfield House, Donal McCann and Máirtín Ó Direáin. Broadcaster Mike Murphy, Derek Daly former Formula One driver, comedian Dave Allen, Olympic boxer Mick Dowling, musicians Republic of Loose, Rob Smith, The Coronas and Grammy-winner Susan McKeown all hail from Terenure.

== Sport ==
Terenure is the home of Terenure College RFC, a senior rugby club in Division 1A of the AIB All Ireland League.

Terenure Rangers Football Club provide schoolboy, schoolgirl and adult football for men and women to the surrounding area.

Terenure Sports Club is also in Terenure.

== See also ==
- List of towns and villages in Ireland
