= George Moore (Dublin MP) =

George Moore, later sometimes called George Ogle Moore (born 13 October 1778) was an Irish lawyer and politician.

== Biography ==
He was the fifth (fourth surviving) son of John Moore of Summerhill, Dublin, and his wife Mary Anne. Lorenzo Moore was his uncle. He was educated at Trinity College, Dublin, where he became scholar in 1796, entered Gray's Inn and King's Inns, and was called to the Irish bar in 1800. On his father's death in 1799 he was appointed to succeed him as deputy to the registrar of deeds of Ireland, a sinecure office held by his uncle George Ogle since 1784. When Ogle died in 1814, Moore continued as deputy to the new registrar Lord Kilwarden. He also inherited Ogle's estate of Bellevue House, Ballyhogue, county Wexford, which he sold to Anthony Cliffe in 1825.

As a barrister, Moore practised in the ecclesiastical courts. Between 1817 and 1819 he argued against the abolition of the office of registrar of deeds (for which as deputy he received substantial fees) before the commission on the Irish courts of justice. He unsuccessfully applied for the post of recorder of Dublin in 1821 and again in 1828, but was appointed King's Counsel. A high Tory and member of the Orange Order, his contemporaries commented on the contrast between the violence of his political opinions and the mild-mannered way in which he expressed them. Previously considered a candidate for Dublin University, at the 1826 general election he was returned for the city of Dublin. In Parliament he opposed Catholic emancipation, Jewish emancipation, and parliamentary reform. He succeeded Lord Kilwarden as registrar of deeds in 1830, though his appointment was delayed to coincide with the 1830 general election, as his appointment to an office of profit would otherwise have required a by-election.

The Tory government fell in late 1830, and Moore and his Tory colleague Frederick Shaw were defeated at Dublin by Whig candidates in the 1831 general election. Moore did not contribute to the costs of the petition to overturn the election, and after its success declined to stand at the resultant by-election, instead formally proposing Lord Ingestre as candidate. This was probably because his office of registrar of deeds was held at pleasure not for life, and he feared being deprived of it if he continued to sit in opposition to the Whig ministry. His salary as registrar was confirmed at £1,500 by act of Parliament in 1832, but the registrar was barred from sitting in Parliament. As a staunch Tory deprived of a political career, Moore attempted to secure the appointment of one of his sons as assistant registrar in 1835, after Sir Robert Peel returned to government, but was rebuffed. He was also unsuccessful when he requested the office of judge of the prerogative court in 1843.

In 1846, after nearly 48 years performing the office of registrar of deeds (first as deputy then substantively), Moore retired on a pension and was succeeded by his deputy, Morgan O'Connell. His date of death is not known. He had married Elizabeth Armstrong, and their sons included William Ogle Moore (1799–1874), dean of Cashel then of Clogher, James Moore (1807–1895), who emigrated to Australia, and Lorenzo Moore (1808–1894), a clergyman in New Zealand whose daughter Mary Elizabeth married John Eldon Gorst.
