= Viscount Lisburne =

Title in the peerage of Ireland

Viscount Lisburne is a title that has been created twice, both times in the Peerage of Ireland. The first creation came in 1685 in favour of Adam Loftus, along with the subsidiary title of Baron of Rathfarnam. These titles became extinct upon his death in 1691 at the siege of Limerick. The second creation came in 1695 in favour of John Vaughan. For more information on this creation, see Earl of Lisburne.

== Viscounts Lisburne (1685) ==
- Adam Loftus, 1st Viscount Lisburne (1647–1691) and Baron Rathfarnham

Family tree of the Marquesses of Ely, the Earls of Ely, and the Viscounts Loftus

Edward Loftus
Robert Loftus	Adam Loftus c. 1533–1605
Viscount Loftus (1st creation), 1622
Adam Loftus c. 1568–1643; 1st Viscount Loftus	Dudley Loftus; 1561–1616
Arthur Loftus c. 1598–1680; 2nd Viscount Loftus	Adam Loftus	Nicholas Loftus; 1592–1666
Arthur Loftus d. 1665
Viscount Lisburne (1st creation) and Baron of Rathfarnham, 1686
Edward Loftus; 1644–1725; 3rd Viscount Loftus	Adam Loftus; 1647–1691; Viscount Lisburne	Henry Loftus; 1636–1716
Viscountcy Loftus (1st creation) extinct, 1725	Viscountcy Lisburne (1st creation) extinct, 1691
Baron Loftus of Loftus Hall (1st creation), 1751; Viscount Loftus (2nd creation), 1756
Charles Tottenham; 1685–1758	Nicholas Loftus c. 1687–1763; 1st Viscount Loftus, etc.
Baronet of Tottenham Green, 1780	Earl of Ely (1st creation), 1766	Earl of Ely (2nd creation), 1771
Charles Tottenham; 1716–1795	John Tottenham; 1714–1787; 1st Baronet of Tottenham Green	Elizabeth Loftus d. 1747	Nicholas Hume-Loftus; 1708–1766; 1st Earl of Ely, 2nd Viscount Loftus, etc.	Henry Loftus; 1709–1783; Earl of Ely, 4th Viscount Loftus, etc.
Earldom of Ely, Viscountcy and Barony Loftus extinct, 1783
Baron Loftus of Loftus Hall (2nd creation), 1785; Viscount Loftus (3rd creation), 1789; Earl of Ely (3rd creation), 1794; Marquess of Ely, 1800; Baron Loftus of Long Loftus, 1801	Baronet of Mount Loftus, 1768
Charles Loftus; 1738–1806; 1st Marquess of Ely, etc., 2nd Baronet of Tottenham Green	Nicholas Hume-Loftus; 1738–1769; 2nd Earl of Ely, 3rd Viscount Loftus, etc.	Edward Loftus c. 1742–1818; 1st Baronet of Mount Loftus
Earldom of Ely (1st creation) extinct, 1769; Viscountcy and Barony passed to uncle, Henry
John Loftus; 1770–1845; 2nd Marquess of Ely, etc., 3rd Baronet of Tottenham Green	Robert Ponsonby Tottenham; 1773–1850	Nicholas Loftus; 1763–1832; 2nd Baronet of Mount Loftus	Francis Hamilton Loftus; 1778–1864; 3rd Baronet of Mount Loftus
Baronetcy of Mount Loftus extinct, 1864
John Henry Loftus; 1814–1857; 3rd Marquess of Ely, etc., 4th Baronet of Tottenham Green	Adam Loftus; 1816–1866	Augustus Loftus; 1817–1904	Charles John Tottenham; 1808–1878	George Tottenham; 1825–1911
John Henry Wellington Graham Loftus; 1849–1889; 4th Marquess of Ely, etc., 5th Baronet of Tottenham Green	John Henry Loftus; 1851–1925; 5th Marquess of Ely, etc., 6th Baronet of Tottenham Green	George Herbert Loftus; 1854–1935; 6th Marquess of Ely, etc., 7th Baronet of Tottenham Green	Charles Robert Worsley Tottenham; 1845–1923
George Leonard Tottenham; 1879–1928
George Henry Wellington Loftus; 1903–1969; 7th Marquess of Ely, etc., 8th Baronet of Tottenham Green	Charles John Tottenham; 1913–2006; 8th Marquess of Ely, etc., 9th Baronet of Tottenham Green
(Charles) John Tottenham b. 1943; 9th Marquess of Ely, etc., 10th Baronet of Tottenham Green	Timothy Craig Tottenham b. 1948
Heir presumptive to the marquessate of Ely

== Viscounts Lisburne (1695) ==
- see Earl of Lisburne
