= Earl of Ely =

Title in the peerage of Ireland

Loftus Hall (2003), the seat of the Loftus family.

Earl of Ely is a title that has been created three times in the Peerage of Ireland for members of the Loftus family. This family descended from Nicholas Loftus, 1st Viscount Loftus, who was raised to the Peerage of Ireland as Baron Loftus, of Loftus Hall in the County of Wexford, in 1751. In 1756 he was further honoured when he was made Viscount Loftus, of Ely in the County of Wicklow. He was succeeded by his son, Nicholas, the second Viscount. He had previously represented Fethard in the Irish House of Commons. In 1766 he was created Earl of Ely in the Peerage of Ireland. Lord Ely assumed the additional surname of Hume. He was succeeded by his son, Nicholas, the second Earl. He represented both Fethard and Bannow in the Irish Parliament.

The earldom became extinct on his early death in 1769 while he was succeeded in the barony and viscountcy by his uncle, Henry, the fourth Viscount. He represented Bannow and County Wexford in the Irish House of Commons. In 1771 the earldom was revived when he was created Earl of Ely in the Peerage of Ireland. However, all three titles became extinct on his death in 1783. He devised his estates to his nephew Charles Tottenham, who assumed the surname of Loftus in lieu of his patronymic and was created Baron Loftus in 1789, Viscount Loftus in 1789, Earl of Ely in 1794 and Marquess of Ely in 1800. See the latter title for more information on these peerages.

The title refers to Ely in County Wicklow, not to the English city of Ely, Cambridgeshire; the second syllable is pronounced to rhyme with "lie" rather than "lee" (and so the title is pronounced in the same way as the first name Eli).

== Viscounts Loftus (1756) ==
- Nicholas Loftus, 1st Viscount Loftus (c. 1687–1763)
- Nicholas Hume-Loftus, 2nd Viscount Loftus (died 1766) (created Earl of Ely in 1766)

=== Earls of Ely; first creation (1766) ===
- Nicholas Hume-Loftus, 1st Earl of Ely (died 1766)
- Nicholas Hume-Loftus, 2nd Earl of Ely (1738–1769)

=== Viscounts Loftus (1756; reverted) ===
- Henry Loftus, 4th Viscount Loftus (1709–1783) (created Earl of Ely in 1771)

== Earls of Ely; second creation (1771) ==
- Henry Loftus, 1st Earl of Ely (1709–1783)

== Family tree ==
Family tree of the Marquesses of Ely, the Earls of Ely, and the Viscounts Loftus

Edward Loftus
Robert Loftus	Adam Loftus c. 1533–1605
Viscount Loftus (1st creation), 1622
Adam Loftus c. 1568–1643; 1st Viscount Loftus	Dudley Loftus; 1561–1616
Arthur Loftus c. 1598–1680; 2nd Viscount Loftus	Adam Loftus	Nicholas Loftus; 1592–1666
Arthur Loftus d. 1665
Viscount Lisburne (1st creation) and Baron of Rathfarnham, 1686
Edward Loftus; 1644–1725; 3rd Viscount Loftus	Adam Loftus; 1647–1691; Viscount Lisburne	Henry Loftus; 1636–1716
Viscountcy Loftus (1st creation) extinct, 1725	Viscountcy Lisburne (1st creation) extinct, 1691
Baron Loftus of Loftus Hall (1st creation), 1751; Viscount Loftus (2nd creation), 1756
Charles Tottenham; 1685–1758	Nicholas Loftus c. 1687–1763; 1st Viscount Loftus, etc.
Baronet of Tottenham Green, 1780	Earl of Ely (1st creation), 1766	Earl of Ely (2nd creation), 1771
Charles Tottenham; 1716–1795	John Tottenham; 1714–1787; 1st Baronet of Tottenham Green	Elizabeth Loftus d. 1747	Nicholas Hume-Loftus; 1708–1766; 1st Earl of Ely, 2nd Viscount Loftus, etc.	Henry Loftus; 1709–1783; Earl of Ely, 4th Viscount Loftus, etc.
Earldom of Ely, Viscountcy and Barony Loftus extinct, 1783
Baron Loftus of Loftus Hall (2nd creation), 1785; Viscount Loftus (3rd creation), 1789; Earl of Ely (3rd creation), 1794; Marquess of Ely, 1800; Baron Loftus of Long Loftus, 1801	Baronet of Mount Loftus, 1768
Charles Loftus; 1738–1806; 1st Marquess of Ely, etc., 2nd Baronet of Tottenham Green	Nicholas Hume-Loftus; 1738–1769; 2nd Earl of Ely, 3rd Viscount Loftus, etc.	Edward Loftus c. 1742–1818; 1st Baronet of Mount Loftus
Earldom of Ely (1st creation) extinct, 1769; Viscountcy and Barony passed to uncle, Henry
John Loftus; 1770–1845; 2nd Marquess of Ely, etc., 3rd Baronet of Tottenham Green	Robert Ponsonby Tottenham; 1773–1850	Nicholas Loftus; 1763–1832; 2nd Baronet of Mount Loftus	Francis Hamilton Loftus; 1778–1864; 3rd Baronet of Mount Loftus
Baronetcy of Mount Loftus extinct, 1864
John Henry Loftus; 1814–1857; 3rd Marquess of Ely, etc., 4th Baronet of Tottenham Green	Adam Loftus; 1816–1866	Augustus Loftus; 1817–1904	Charles John Tottenham; 1808–1878	George Tottenham; 1825–1911
John Henry Wellington Graham Loftus; 1849–1889; 4th Marquess of Ely, etc., 5th Baronet of Tottenham Green	John Henry Loftus; 1851–1925; 5th Marquess of Ely, etc., 6th Baronet of Tottenham Green	George Herbert Loftus; 1854–1935; 6th Marquess of Ely, etc., 7th Baronet of Tottenham Green	Charles Robert Worsley Tottenham; 1845–1923
George Leonard Tottenham; 1879–1928
George Henry Wellington Loftus; 1903–1969; 7th Marquess of Ely, etc., 8th Baronet of Tottenham Green	Charles John Tottenham; 1913–2006; 8th Marquess of Ely, etc., 9th Baronet of Tottenham Green
(Charles) John Tottenham b. 1943; 9th Marquess of Ely, etc., 10th Baronet of Tottenham Green	Timothy Craig Tottenham b. 1948
Heir presumptive to the marquessate of Ely

== See also ==
- Marquess of Ely
