= Marquess of Ely =

Title in the peerage of Ireland

Marquessate of Ely
- Arms of Tottenham
- Creation date: 29 December 1800
- Created by: George III
- Peerage: Peerage of Ireland
- First holder: Charles Loftus, 1st Marquess of Ely
- Present holder: John Tottenham, 9th Marquess of Ely
- Heir presumptive: Lord Timothy Tottenham
- Subsidiary titles: Earl of Ely; Viscount Loftus; Baron Loftus (I); Baron Loftus (UK)
- Status: Extant
- Former seat: Loftus Hall Rathfarnham Castle
- Motto: AD ASTRA SEQUOR (I follow to the stars)
- Arms: Gules, three Bars dancetty Argent
- Crest: A Lion rampant Gules, armed and langued Azure
- Supporters: On either side an Eagle with wings inverted Argent, beaked and legged Or, charged on the breast with a Trefoil slipped Vert.

Arms of Loftus, 1st - 7th Marquess: Sable, a Chevron engrailed Ermine, between three Trefoils slipped Argent.

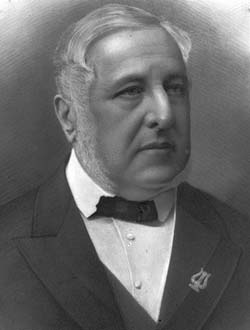
Lord Augustus Loftus, fourth son of the second Marquess of Ely and perhaps the most prominent member of the Loftus family.

Marquess of Ely, of the County of Wexford, is a title in the Peerage of Ireland. It was created in 1800 for Charles Loftus, 1st Earl of Ely. He was born Charles Tottenham, the son of Sir John Tottenham, 1st Baronet, who had been created a baronet, of Tottenham Green in the County of Wexford, in the Baronetage of Ireland in 1780, by Elizabeth, daughter of Nicholas Loftus, 1st Viscount Loftus, sister and heiress of Henry Loftus, 1st Earl of Ely (see Viscount Loftus and Earl of Ely for earlier history of the Loftus family).

In 1783, he succeeded to the Loftus estates on the death of his maternal uncle the Earl of Ely and assumed the same year by Royal licence the surname of Loftus in lieu of his patronymic. In 1785, he was raised to the Peerage of Ireland as Baron Loftus, of Loftus Hall in the County of Wexford. The Hall itself was sold by the family in 1917 and is today owned by the Quigley family.

He was further honoured when he was made Viscount Loftus, of Ely, in 1789, Earl of Ely, in the Kingdom of Ireland, in 1794, and Marquess of Ely, of the County of Wexford, in 1800, all in the Peerage of Ireland, becoming one of the few persons to rise to the rank of Marquess without having inherited any peerages. In 1801 he was created Baron Loftus, of Long Loftus in the County of York, in the Peerage of the United Kingdom, by which title the Marquesses of Ely sat in the House of Lords until the passage of the House of Lords Act 1999. Lord Ely also succeeded his father as second Baronet in 1786.

Lord Ely was succeeded by his eldest son, John, the second Marquess. He had previously represented County Wexford in both the Irish and British Parliaments. On his death, the titles passed to his eldest son, John, the third Marquess. He briefly represented Woodstock in Parliament in 1845. This line of the family failed on the early death of his son, John, the fourth Marquess, in 1889. The late Marquess was succeeded by his first cousin John Loftus, the fifth Marquess. He was the eldest son of Reverend Lord Adam Loftus, third son of the second Marquess. The fifth Marquess died childless in 1925 and was succeeded by his youngest brother, George, the sixth Marquess.

The latter's only surviving son, George, the seventh Marquess, was High Sheriff of County Fermanagh. On his death in 1969 without surviving children the line of the second Marquess failed. The late Marquess was succeeded by his third cousin once removed, Charles Tottenham, who became the eighth Marquess. He was the great-grandson of Lieutenant-Colonel Charles John Tottenham, DL, JP, eldest son of the Right Reverend Lord Robert Tottenham (who had not assumed the surname Loftus), second son of the first Marquess. The eighth Marquess lived in Canada. Since 2006, the titles are held by his eldest son, the ninth Marquess. As of 28 February 2014, the present Baronet has not successfully proven his succession and is therefore not on the Official Roll of the Baronetage, with the baronetcy considered dormant since 2006.

Several other members of the family may also be mentioned. Charles Tottenham, father of the first Baronet, represented New Ross in the Irish House of Commons. Charles Tottenham, brother of the first Baronet, also represented New Ross in the Irish Parliament. The aforementioned the Right Reverend Lord Robert Tottenham, second son of the first Marquess, was Bishop of Clogher. Jane Loftus (1820–1890) was the wife of the second Marquess, and Lady of the Bedchamber and great friend of Queen Victoria. Henry Loftus Tottenham (1860–1950), son of John Francis Tottenham, son of Lord Robert Tottenham, was an admiral in the Royal Navy. Sir Alexander Robert Loftus Tottenham (1873–1946), son of John Francis Tottenham, was the administrator of Pudukkottai in British India. The Very Reverend George Tottenham (1825–1911), son of Lord Robert Tottenham, was Dean of Clogher. Lord Augustus Loftus, fourth son of the second Marquess, was a prominent diplomat. The Right Reverend Ann Tottenham, daughter of the eighth Marquess, was a bishop in the Anglican Church of Canada.

The title refers to Ely in County Wicklow, not to the City of Ely in Cambridgeshire, and the second syllable is pronounced to rhyme with "lee" rather than "lie" (the title is not pronounced in the same way as the first name Eli).

The similar title Marquess of the Isle of Ely was created with the Dukedom of Edinburgh in 1726.

The family seat was Loftus Hall, near Hook, County Wexford.

== Tottenham, later Loftus, later Tottenham baronets, of Tottenham Green (1780) ==
- Sir John Tottenham, 1st Baronet (1714–1786)
- Sir Charles Loftus, 2nd Baronet (1738–1806) (created Baron Loftus in 1785, Viscount Loftus in 1789, Earl of Ely in 1794 and Marquess of Ely in 1800)

== Marquesses of Ely (1800) ==
- Charles Loftus, 1st Marquess of Ely (1738–1806)
- John Loftus, 2nd Marquess of Ely (1770–1845)
- John Henry Loftus, 3rd Marquess of Ely (1814–1857)
- John Henry Wellington Graham Loftus, 4th Marquess of Ely (1849–1889)
- John Henry Loftus, 5th Marquess of Ely (1851–1925)
- George Herbert Loftus, 6th Marquess of Ely (1854–1935)
- George Henry Wellington Loftus, 7th Marquess of Ely (1903–1969)
- Charles John Tottenham, 8th Marquess of Ely (1913–2006)
- (Charles) John Tottenham, 9th Marquess of Ely (born 1943)

== Present peer ==
Charles John Tottenham, 9th Marquess of Ely (born 12 February 1943) is the son of the 8th Marquess and his wife Katherine Elizabeth Craig. He uses his middle name of John and was educated at Trinity College School, Port Hope, Ontario, Canada, Collège de Genève, International School, Geneva, and the University of Toronto, where he graduated BA and MA. He was styled as Viscount Loftus between 1969 and 2006, when he succeeded to the peerages and baronetcy. In 2003 he lived in Calgary, Alberta, where he was head of the French department at Strathcona-Tweedsmuir School.

In 1969, Ely married Judith Marvelle Porter, daughter of Dr John Jacob Porter, and they have two adopted children:

- Lord Andrew John Tottenham (born 1973)
- Lady Jennifer Katherine Tottenham (born 1975)

Until 2004, children who were adopted by peers had no right to any noble or courtesy title. However, as a result of a Royal Warrant dated 30 April 2004, all children are now automatically entitled to the same styles and courtesy titles. Nonetheless, they are still excluded from succession to the marquessate and other hereditary titles.

The heir presumptive is the present peer's brother Lord Timothy Craig Tottenham (born 1948), whose heir apparent is his elder son Scott Craig Tottenham (born 1977), whose son Charles Craig Luis Tottenham (born 2007) is next in line.

== Family tree and line of succession ==
Family tree of the Marquesses of Ely, the Earls of Ely, and the Viscounts Loftus

Edward Loftus
Robert Loftus	Adam Loftus c. 1533–1605
Viscount Loftus (1st creation), 1622
Adam Loftus c. 1568–1643; 1st Viscount Loftus	Dudley Loftus; 1561–1616
Arthur Loftus c. 1598–1680; 2nd Viscount Loftus	Adam Loftus	Nicholas Loftus; 1592–1666
Arthur Loftus d. 1665
Viscount Lisburne (1st creation) and Baron of Rathfarnham, 1686
Edward Loftus; 1644–1725; 3rd Viscount Loftus	Adam Loftus; 1647–1691; Viscount Lisburne	Henry Loftus; 1636–1716
Viscountcy Loftus (1st creation) extinct, 1725	Viscountcy Lisburne (1st creation) extinct, 1691
Baron Loftus of Loftus Hall (1st creation), 1751; Viscount Loftus (2nd creation), 1756
Charles Tottenham; 1685–1758	Nicholas Loftus c. 1687–1763; 1st Viscount Loftus, etc.
Baronet of Tottenham Green, 1780	Earl of Ely (1st creation), 1766	Earl of Ely (2nd creation), 1771
Charles Tottenham; 1716–1795	John Tottenham; 1714–1787; 1st Baronet of Tottenham Green	Elizabeth Loftus d. 1747	Nicholas Hume-Loftus; 1708–1766; 1st Earl of Ely, 2nd Viscount Loftus, etc.	Henry Loftus; 1709–1783; Earl of Ely, 4th Viscount Loftus, etc.
Earldom of Ely, Viscountcy and Barony Loftus extinct, 1783
Baron Loftus of Loftus Hall (2nd creation), 1785; Viscount Loftus (3rd creation), 1789; Earl of Ely (3rd creation), 1794; Marquess of Ely, 1800; Baron Loftus of Long Loftus, 1801	Baronet of Mount Loftus, 1768
Charles Loftus; 1738–1806; 1st Marquess of Ely, etc., 2nd Baronet of Tottenham Green	Nicholas Hume-Loftus; 1738–1769; 2nd Earl of Ely, 3rd Viscount Loftus, etc.	Edward Loftus c. 1742–1818; 1st Baronet of Mount Loftus
Earldom of Ely (1st creation) extinct, 1769; Viscountcy and Barony passed to uncle, Henry
John Loftus; 1770–1845; 2nd Marquess of Ely, etc., 3rd Baronet of Tottenham Green	Robert Ponsonby Tottenham; 1773–1850	Nicholas Loftus; 1763–1832; 2nd Baronet of Mount Loftus	Francis Hamilton Loftus; 1778–1864; 3rd Baronet of Mount Loftus
Baronetcy of Mount Loftus extinct, 1864
John Henry Loftus; 1814–1857; 3rd Marquess of Ely, etc., 4th Baronet of Tottenham Green	Adam Loftus; 1816–1866	Augustus Loftus; 1817–1904	Charles John Tottenham; 1808–1878	George Tottenham; 1825–1911
John Henry Wellington Graham Loftus; 1849–1889; 4th Marquess of Ely, etc., 5th Baronet of Tottenham Green	John Henry Loftus; 1851–1925; 5th Marquess of Ely, etc., 6th Baronet of Tottenham Green	George Herbert Loftus; 1854–1935; 6th Marquess of Ely, etc., 7th Baronet of Tottenham Green	Charles Robert Worsley Tottenham; 1845–1923
George Leonard Tottenham; 1879–1928
George Henry Wellington Loftus; 1903–1969; 7th Marquess of Ely, etc., 8th Baronet of Tottenham Green	Charles John Tottenham; 1913–2006; 8th Marquess of Ely, etc., 9th Baronet of Tottenham Green
(Charles) John Tottenham b. 1943; 9th Marquess of Ely, etc., 10th Baronet of Tottenham Green	Timothy Craig Tottenham b. 1948
Heir presumptive to the marquessate of Ely

Line of succession (simplified)
- Charles Loftus, 1st Marquess of Ely (1738–1806)
  - John Loftus, 2nd Marquess of Ely (1770–1845)
    - John Loftus, 3rd Marquess of Ely (1814–1857)
      - John Loftus, 4th Marquess of Ely (1849–1889)
    - Lord Adam Loftus (1816–1866)
      - John Loftus, 5th Marquess of Ely (1851–1925)
      - George Loftus, 6th Marquess of Ely (1854–1935)
        - George Loftus, 7th Marquess of Ely (1903–1969)
  - Lord Robert Tottenham (1773–1850)
    - Charles John Tottenham (1808–1870)
      - Charles Robert Worsley Tottenham (1845–1923)
        - George Leonard Tottenham (1879–1928)
          - Charles Tottenham, 8th Marquess of Ely (1913–2006)
            - John Tottenham, 9th Marquess of Ely (b. 1943)
            - (1) Lord Timothy Craig Tottenham (b. 1948)
              - (2) Scott Craig Tottenham (b. 1977)
                - (3) Charles Craig Luis Tottenham (b. 2007)
              - (4) John Douglas Tottenham (b. 1981)
                - (5) Nathanial Charles Tottenham (b. 2012)
            - (6) Lord Richard Ivor Tottenham (b. 1954)
    - George Tottenham (1825–1911)
      - Edward Loftus Tottenham (1867–1949)
        - George William Loftus Tottenham (1911–1998)
          - Robert Ashley Christopher Tottenham (1953–1990)
            - male issue and descendants in remainder

== See also ==
- Earl of Ely

== Sources ==
- Hesilrige, Arthur G. M. (1921). Debrett's Peerage and Titles of courtesy. London: Dean & Son. p. 345.
- Leigh Rayment's Peerage Pages
