= Viscount Loftus =

Hereditary title in the Peerage of Ireland

Viscount Loftus is a title that has been created three times in the Peerage of Ireland for members of the Anglo-Irish Loftus family.

The first creation was for Adam Loftus on 10 May 1622, who served as Lord Chancellor of Ireland in 1619. This title became extinct in 1725 upon the death of the third viscount, who had no male heir, despite having married three times.

The second creation was for Nicholas Loftus in 1756, a great-grandson of Adam and a member of the Irish House of Commons. Two of his sons were created earls as Earl of Ely, although both titles became extinct.

The third creation of the title was for Charles Loftus in 1789, who became Marquess of Ely in 1800. This title is extant.

== Viscounts Loftus; First creation (1622) ==
- Adam Loftus, 1st Viscount Loftus (c. 1568–1643)
- Edward Loftus, 2nd Viscount Loftus (c. 1598 – 11 April 1680)
- Arthur Loftus, 3rd Viscount Loftus (18 June 1644 – 6 November 1725)

== Viscounts Loftus; Second creation (1756) ==
- Nicholas Loftus, 1st Viscount Loftus (c. 1687 – 31 December 1763)
- Nicholas Hume-Loftus, 2nd Viscount Loftus (1714 – 31 October 1766) (created Earl of Ely in 1766)

See Earl of Ely for succession to this creation.

== Viscounts Loftus; Third creation (1789) ==
- Charles Loftus, 1st Viscount Loftus (1738–1806) (created Marquess of Ely in 1800)

See Marquess of Ely for succession to this creation.

== Family tree ==
Family tree of the Marquesses of Ely, the Earls of Ely, and the Viscounts Loftus

Edward Loftus
Robert Loftus	Adam Loftus c. 1533–1605
Viscount Loftus (1st creation), 1622
Adam Loftus c. 1568–1643; 1st Viscount Loftus	Dudley Loftus; 1561–1616
Arthur Loftus c. 1598–1680; 2nd Viscount Loftus	Adam Loftus	Nicholas Loftus; 1592–1666
Arthur Loftus d. 1665
Viscount Lisburne (1st creation) and Baron of Rathfarnham, 1686
Edward Loftus; 1644–1725; 3rd Viscount Loftus	Adam Loftus; 1647–1691; Viscount Lisburne	Henry Loftus; 1636–1716
Viscountcy Loftus (1st creation) extinct, 1725	Viscountcy Lisburne (1st creation) extinct, 1691
Baron Loftus of Loftus Hall (1st creation), 1751; Viscount Loftus (2nd creation), 1756
Charles Tottenham; 1685–1758	Nicholas Loftus c. 1687–1763; 1st Viscount Loftus, etc.
Baronet of Tottenham Green, 1780	Earl of Ely (1st creation), 1766	Earl of Ely (2nd creation), 1771
Charles Tottenham; 1716–1795	John Tottenham; 1714–1787; 1st Baronet of Tottenham Green	Elizabeth Loftus d. 1747	Nicholas Hume-Loftus; 1708–1766; 1st Earl of Ely, 2nd Viscount Loftus, etc.	Henry Loftus; 1709–1783; Earl of Ely, 4th Viscount Loftus, etc.
Earldom of Ely, Viscountcy and Barony Loftus extinct, 1783
Baron Loftus of Loftus Hall (2nd creation), 1785; Viscount Loftus (3rd creation), 1789; Earl of Ely (3rd creation), 1794; Marquess of Ely, 1800; Baron Loftus of Long Loftus, 1801	Baronet of Mount Loftus, 1768
Charles Loftus; 1738–1806; 1st Marquess of Ely, etc., 2nd Baronet of Tottenham Green	Nicholas Hume-Loftus; 1738–1769; 2nd Earl of Ely, 3rd Viscount Loftus, etc.	Edward Loftus c. 1742–1818; 1st Baronet of Mount Loftus
Earldom of Ely (1st creation) extinct, 1769; Viscountcy and Barony passed to uncle, Henry
John Loftus; 1770–1845; 2nd Marquess of Ely, etc., 3rd Baronet of Tottenham Green	Robert Ponsonby Tottenham; 1773–1850	Nicholas Loftus; 1763–1832; 2nd Baronet of Mount Loftus	Francis Hamilton Loftus; 1778–1864; 3rd Baronet of Mount Loftus
Baronetcy of Mount Loftus extinct, 1864
John Henry Loftus; 1814–1857; 3rd Marquess of Ely, etc., 4th Baronet of Tottenham Green	Adam Loftus; 1816–1866	Augustus Loftus; 1817–1904	Charles John Tottenham; 1808–1878	George Tottenham; 1825–1911
John Henry Wellington Graham Loftus; 1849–1889; 4th Marquess of Ely, etc., 5th Baronet of Tottenham Green	John Henry Loftus; 1851–1925; 5th Marquess of Ely, etc., 6th Baronet of Tottenham Green	George Herbert Loftus; 1854–1935; 6th Marquess of Ely, etc., 7th Baronet of Tottenham Green	Charles Robert Worsley Tottenham; 1845–1923
George Leonard Tottenham; 1879–1928
George Henry Wellington Loftus; 1903–1969; 7th Marquess of Ely, etc., 8th Baronet of Tottenham Green	Charles John Tottenham; 1913–2006; 8th Marquess of Ely, etc., 9th Baronet of Tottenham Green
(Charles) John Tottenham b. 1943; 9th Marquess of Ely, etc., 10th Baronet of Tottenham Green	Timothy Craig Tottenham b. 1948
Heir presumptive to the marquessate of Ely
