= Nicholas Hume-Loftus =

Nicholas Hume-Loftus may refer to:

- Nicholas Hume-Loftus, 1st Earl of Ely (died 1766)
- Nicholas Hume-Loftus, 2nd Earl of Ely (1738–1769)
