= Earl of Courtown =

Title in the peerage of Ireland

Earldom of Courtown
- Stopford arms: Azure, semée of cross-crosslets three lozenges or; crest: A wyvern wings displayed vert; supporters: Dexter: On either side, a stag proper collared chained and charged on the shoulder with a lozenge or.
- Creation date: 12 April 1762
- Created by: King George III
- Peerage: Peerage of Ireland
- First holder: James Stopford, 1st Baron Courtown
- Present holder: Patrick Stopford, 9th Earl of Courtown
- Heir apparent: James Stopford, Viscount Stopford
- Remainder to: The 1st Earls’ heirs male of the body lawfully begotten
- Subsidiary titles: Viscount Stopford; Baron Courtown; Baron Saltersford
- Status: Extant
- Former seat: Courtown House
- Motto: PATRIÆ INFELICI FIDELIS (Faithful to an unhappy country)

The Earl of Courtown, in the County of Wexford, is a title in the Peerage of Ireland. It was created on 12 April 1762 for James Stopford, 1st Baron Courtown. He had previously represented County Wexford and Fethard in the Irish House of Commons. Stopford had already been created Baron Courtown, of Courtown in the County of Wexford, on 19 September 1758, and was made Viscount Stopford at the same time he was given the earldom. These titles are also in the Peerage of Ireland. He was succeeded by his eldest son, the second earl. He was a Tory politician and served under William Pitt the Younger as Treasurer of the Household from 1784 to 1793. On 7 June 1796, he was created Baron Saltersford, of Saltersford in the County Palatine of Chester, in the Peerage of Great Britain. This title gave him and his descendants an automatic seat in the British House of Lords.

His eldest son, the third earl, was also a Tory politician. He succeeded his father as Treasurer of the Household and was also Captain of the Honourable Band of Gentlemen Pensioners for many years. He was succeeded by his third but eldest surviving son, the fourth earl. He represented County Wexford in the House of Commons as a Tory. His only son from his first marriage, the fifth earl, served as a Deputy Lieutenant of County Wexford. He was succeeded by his eldest son, the sixth earl. He was Lord Lieutenant of County Wexford. His eldest son, the seventh earl, was a major-general in the army and served as deputy assistant adjutant-general at the War Office from 1941 to 1947. As of 2014 the titles are held by the latter's grandson, the ninth earl, who succeeded his father in 1975. Lord Courtown was one of the ninety elected hereditary peers that remained in the House of Lords after the passing of the House of Lords Act 1999, and sat as a Conservative.

Several other members of the Stopford family have also gained distinction, especially in the army and Royal Navy. The Hon. Edward Stopford (1732–1794), second son of the first earl, was a lieutenant-general in the army. His son William Henry Stopford-Blair (1788–1868) was a colonel in the Royal Artillery. He added "Blair" to his name after receiving a substantial bequest from brother-in-law, James Blair a prominent slave owner and anti-abolitionist activist. The Hon. Sir Edward Stopford (1766–1837), second son of the second earl, was a lieutenant-general in the army. The Hon. Sir Robert Stopford, third son of the second earl, was an Admiral of the Red. His eldest son Robert Fanshawe Stopford (1811–1891) was an admiral in the Royal Navy and was the father of 1) Robert Wilbraham Stopford (1844–1911), a vice-admiral in the Royal Navy, 2) Arthur Bouverie Stopford (1845–1902), a colonel in the Royal Artillery and 3) Frederick George Stopford (1852–1928), a vice-admiral in the Royal Navy; while his second son James John Stopford (1817–1868) was a vice-admiral in the Royal Navy. Reverend the Hon. Richard Bruce Stopford (1774–1844), fourth son of the second earl, was Canon of Windsor and Chaplain to Her Majesty Queen Victoria.

The Hon. Sir Montagu Stopford, fifth son of the third earl, was a vice-admiral in the Royal Navy. His youngest son Sir Lionel Stopford was a colonel and honorary major-general in the Derby Regiment and Irish Guards. His eldest son Sir Montagu Stopford was a general in the Rifle Brigade. The Hon. Sir Frederick Stopford, second son from the second marriage of the fourth earl, was a lieutenant-general in the army. The Hon. Walter George Stopford (1855–1918), third son from the second marriage of the fourth earl, was a rear-admiral in the Royal Navy. The Hon. Arthur Stopford (1879–1955), second son of the sixth earl, was a vice-admiral in the Royal Navy. His son, Godfrey Vyvyan, married Marjorie Lupton in 1934.

The family seat was Courtown House, near Gorey, County Wexford.

== Earls of Courtown (1762) ==
- James Stopford, 1st Earl of Courtown (1700–1770)
- James Stopford, 2nd Earl of Courtown (1731–1810)
- James George Stopford, 3rd Earl of Courtown (1765–1835)
- James Thomas Stopford, 4th Earl of Courtown (1794–1858)
- James George Henry Stopford, 5th Earl of Courtown (1823–1914)
- James Walter Milles Stopford, 6th Earl of Courtown (1853–1933)
- James Richard Neville Stopford, 7th Earl of Courtown (1877–1957)
- James Montagu Burgoyne Stopford, 8th Earl of Courtown (1908–1975)
- James Patrick Montagu Burgoyne Winthrop Stopford, 9th Earl of Courtown (b. 1954)

The heir apparent is the present holder's only son James Richard Ian Montagu Stopford, Viscount Stopford (b. 1988)
The heir apparent's heir apparent is his son, Hon. James Freddie Montagu Stopford (b. 2022)
