= James Stopford, 1st Earl of Courtown =

Irish politician

James Stopford, 1st Earl of Courtown (1700 – 12 January 1770) was an Irish politician.

Courtown was the son of James Stopford, of Courtown, County Wexford, who represented County Wexford in the Irish House of Commons, and his wife Frances (née Jones). He succeeded his father as member of parliament for County Wexford in 1721, a seat he held until 1727, and then represented Fethard (County Wexford) from 1727 to 1758. In 1756, he was appointed High Sheriff of Wexford. In 1758, he was raised to the Peerage of Ireland as Baron Courtown, of Courtown in the County of Wexford. Four years later he was further honoured when he was made Viscount Stopford and Earl of Courtown, in the County of Wexford, also in the Peerage of Ireland.

== Family ==
Lord Courtown married Elizabeth, daughter of the Right Reverend Edward Smyth, Bishop of Down and Connor, and his first wife and cousin Elizabeth Smyth, in 1727. He died in January 1770 and was succeeded in the earldom by his eldest son, James, who became a prominent Tory politician. His second son the Hon. Edward Stopford (1732–1794) was a Major-General in the Army. Another son, the Hon Thomas Stopford, became Bishop of Cork and Ross.

Lady Courtown survived her husband by 18 years and died in September 1788.

== Notes ==
Parliament of Ireland
Preceded by James Stopford; Nicholas Loftus	Member of Parliament for County Wexford; 1721–1727; Served alongside: Nicholas Loftus	Succeeded by Caesar Colclough; Nicholas Loftus
Preceded by Henry Ponsonby; Thomas Palliser	Member of Parliament for Fethard (County Wexford); 1727–1758; Served alongside: George Houghton 1727–1733; Philip Doyne 1733–1755; Charles Tottenham 1755–1758	Succeeded by Nicholas Hume-Loftus; Charles Tottenham
Peerage of Ireland
New creation	Earl of Courtown; 1762–1770	Succeeded by James Stopford
New creation	Baron Courtown; 1758–1770	Succeeded by James Stopford
