= Caesar Colclough =

Caesar Colclough may refer to:

- Sir Caesar Colclough, 2nd Baronet (1624–1684), MP for Newcastle-under-Lyme
- Sir Caesar Colclough, 3rd Baronet (c. 1650–1687) of the Colclough baronets
- Caesar Colclough (died 1726), MP for Taghmon
- Caesar Colclough (1696–1766), MP for County Wexford (Parliament of Ireland constituency)
- Caesar Colclough (judge) (1754–1822), Chief Justice in Court of Appeal of Newfoundland and Labrador
- Caesar Colclough (1766–1842), MP for County Wexford (Parliament of Ireland constituency)
