= Arthur Loftus =

Arthur Loftus may refer to:

- Arthur Loftus (politician, died 1665), Anglo-Irish politician and landowner, member of parliament (MP) for County Wexford
- Arthur Loftus (politician, died 1781) (1724–1781), Anglo-Irish politician, MP for Fethard, and for Clonmines

== See also ==
- Arthur Loftus Tottenham (1838–1887), landowner and politician, MP for Leitrim, and for Winchester
