= Philip Savage =

Anglo-Irish lawyer & politician (1644–1717)

Philip Savage (February 1644 – July 1717) was an Anglo-Irish lawyer and politician who was Chancellor of the Exchequer of Ireland.

He was born in Dublin, the only son of Valentine Savage and Anne Haughton. Savage was educated at Trinity College Dublin, entering the university on 6 July 1659. In 1667 he was admitted to King's Inn as an attorney of the exchequer court. In 1671 he became clerk of the Court of King's Bench (Ireland). He left Ireland in 1688 during the War of the Two Kings, but returned in 1691 when, as clerk of the King's Bench, he indicted over 4,000 Irishmen for high treason against William III of England.

Savage represented County Wexford in the Irish House of Commons from 1692 to 1714. Between 1695 and his death he served as Chancellor of the Exchequer of Ireland, aligning himself with the Tory faction. Following the Hanoverian succession, the Whigs attempted to have Savage removed from office and replaced by Sir Ralph Gore, but Savage refused, dying in office.

Parliament of Ireland
Preceded by Patriot Parliament	Member of Parliament for County Wexford; 1692–1714; With: John Ivory (1692–1695); Mathew Forde (1695–1709); William Hore (1709–1713); James Stopford (1713–1714)	Succeeded by James Stopford; Nicholas Loftus
Political offices
Preceded by Charles Meredyth	Chancellor of the Exchequer of Ireland; 1695–1717	Succeeded by Sir Ralph Gore, 4th Baronet
