= Henry Loftus, Earl of Ely =

Anglo-Irish politician (1709–1783)

The Right Honourable The Earl of Ely
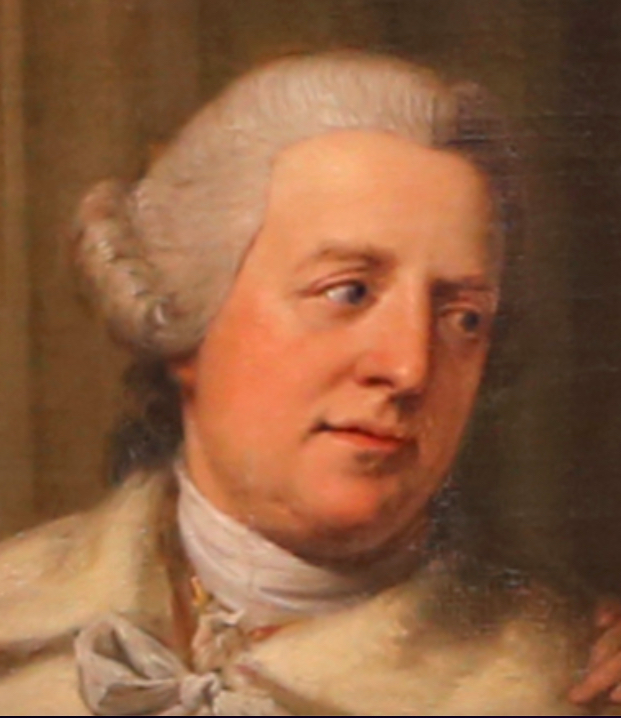
- Portrait by Angelica Kauffman, 1771

Member of Parliament for Bannow and County Wexford

Personal details
- Born: Henry Loftus; 18 November 1709 County Wexford, Ireland
- Died: 8 May 1783 (aged 73) Bath, Somerset
- Party: Independent
- Parent(s): Nicholas Loftus, 1st Viscount Loftus and Anne Ponsonby
- Occupation: Administrator; developer; politician

Henry Loftus, 1st Earl of Ely KP, PC (Ire) (18 November 1709 – 8 May 1783), styled The Honourable from 1751 to 1769 and known as Henry Loftus, 4th Viscount Loftus from 1769 to 1771, was an Anglo-Irish politician who commanded the Loftus Squadron, a small but disproportionately powerful voting bloc in the Irish House of Commons.

Loftus was the second son of Nicholas Loftus, 1st Viscount Loftus and Anne Ponsonby, daughter of William Ponsonby, 1st Viscount Duncannon, living at Loftus Hall in the County of Wexford. He served as Sheriff of the county in 1744 and was resident in the Barony of Bargy at Richfield manor in 1745, (Note: Loftus married firstly in 1745 Frances Monroe, daughter of Henry Monroe of Roe's Hall, County Down; the manor at Richfield was part of the settlement for the marriage from his father.) serving as a member of parliament to the Irish House of Commons in his father's seat of Bannow from 1747.

For the first fifty years of his life, as the younger son, Loftus led a modest life in relative obscurity, subsisting on the patronage he could obtain from his first cousin William Ponsonby, Speaker of the Irish House of Commons.

== The Honourable Henry Loftus ==
Styled The Honourable Henry Loftus in 1751 after his father (1st Viscount Loftus) was enobled, Loftus consolidated his position in Wexford and was returned once more to the Irish Parliament for the County Wexford in 1760 in his own right, acquiring a fashionable townhouse in Cavendish Row as his Dublin residence. (Note: In 18th-century Ireland (and Britain) the difference between being elected MP for a borough seat versus MP for a county seat was substantial and very real — politically, socially, and financially.) For the most part, Loftus remained in relative obscurity in Wexford where he became a strong advocate of textile manufacture in the County for both linen and later silk, was elected a trustee of the Wexford Society and was appointed a justice of the peace, appointments symbolic of his growing local social status.

The following year, Viscount Loftus died, leaving his Wexford properties to his first son Nicholas, who succeeded to his father's titles and assumed his seat in the Irish House of Lords. The rest of the 1st viscount's estate was left to his daughters and natural sons Edward and Nicholas. In 1764, Loftus purchased a twenty year-old mansion Mount Malpas in 150 acres of walled parkland just north of Dublin. He set about refurbishing the house and landscaping the park, which he renamed Loftus Hill, planning in 1768 to build a banqueting house in the woods. (Note: Loftus had inherited his grandfather's passion for real estate and in particularly, for extravagant house improvements. His grandfather, also a "Henry Loftus", had acquired Loftus Hall and various other Wexford lands on the Hook and refurbished them to his taste and style. Renaming Mount Malpas as Loftus Hill was probably a parody of Loftus Hall where Loftus was born, but was his disliked brother's main residence. Plans to refurbish Mount Malpas were cut short, however, when a much bigger prize, Rathfarnham Castle, became available.)

In 1766, Loftus’s older brother died, leaving the family lands and Earldom to his son Lord Loftus, whose capacity to manage his own affairs was severely impaired, attributed in part to years of savage mistreatment by a cruel and dissolute father. Loftus took it upon himself to rehabilitate his nephew, (Note: Loftus knew what a father's contempt felt like and appears to have had genuine concern for his nephew's well-being.) taking him into his home in Cavendish Row, but also using his biddable nature to consolidate his nephew's estate and act in his interest. The first of those tasks was securing the vast Hume estates in Fermanagh, which became "the longest-running and most celebrated of all Irish lawsuits", because it involved establishing the competence of the young earl to inherit his deceased mother’s fortune. (Note: The case ran from 1758 until 1784, settled in Loftus's favour in 1771 after his nephew had died, but was reopened and only finally settled after Loftus's death in 1784.) The second was acquiring Rathfarnham Castle, the oldest Loftus family property in Ireland, which Loftus leased on behalf of his nephew in 1767. Loftus then used his nephew's fortune to completely remodel the house with no expense spared, employing the services of the most celebrated architects (William Chambers and James "Athenian" Stuart), designers (Angelica Kauffman) and local craftsmen of the day (John Baptist Cuvillie).

=== The Loftus Squadron (1768–1801) ===
The Loftus family had held borough seats in the Irish Parliament since 1624, which they controlled as property owners variously from Naas, to Fethard, New Ross and the rotten boroughs of Clonmines and Bannow. By 1761, the family commanded eight seats in Parliament, which had been used to control and influence the local boroughs of Wexford. When Loftus took control of his nephew's interests in 1767, he began by repopulating the family seats with family members from whom he could extract some advantage. (Note: Loftus had promised his natural half-brother Sir Edward Loftus, 1st Baronet a family seat if he would relinquish his claim to income from Wexford estates, then reneged on that promise when he had persuaded two distant cousins, Henry and Arthur Loftus, to return to Ireland to sit for rotten boroughs instead. Sir Edward, who was returned to Parliament for Jamestown had expressed independent opinions that were not necessarily aligned with Loftus's plans for political influence. The two cousins, however, had just cashed in their army commissions and were momentarily cash rich, which Loftus took advantage of by securing a significant loan from both men, guaranteeing their seats and helping Loftus to settle the downpayment on the lease for Rathfarnham Castle.)

By 1768, Loftus had created one of the most powerful voting blocs in the Irish House of Commons known contemporaneously as the Loftus Squadron. (Note: Also known as the "Ely Legion" or "Loftus Legion") The Squadron elevated Loftus to one of a handful of elite Irish Protestants known as undertakers, the "grandees" of the Protestant Ascendancy, which brought him into direct conflict with the new incoming King's representative, Lord Townshend. Townshend was determined to break the power of the undertakers, by trading lucrative preferment in government offices or by granting new peerages in the Irish House of Lords. The Squadron conferred disproportionate political influence on Loftus, particularly in close parliamentary divisions, often frustrating the ambitions of much larger blocs. At other times, the Squadron was made available to the highest bidder, helping Loftus with much needed revenue. The Loftus Squadron continued to influence Irish politics until the Act of Union came into effect in 1801.

== Lord Henry Loftus ==
In 1769, Loftus succeeded his nephew to the Wexford estates and in the House of Lords as the 4th Viscount Ely. He was appointed sole governor to the county not long after, relinquishing his seat in the commons but retaining tight control over the Loftus Squadron. (Note: Loftus, now aged sixty, was in a hurry to consolidate his legacy, indicated by the breadth of his activities over the next ten years.) Townshend wanted to use the Squadron to apply pressure on Loftus's cousin Ponsonby, who was the powerful speaker of the House of Commons, threatening in 1770 to disenfranchise members of the Squadron but Loftus resisted, until his wife's indiscrete intervention.

=== Public scandal ===
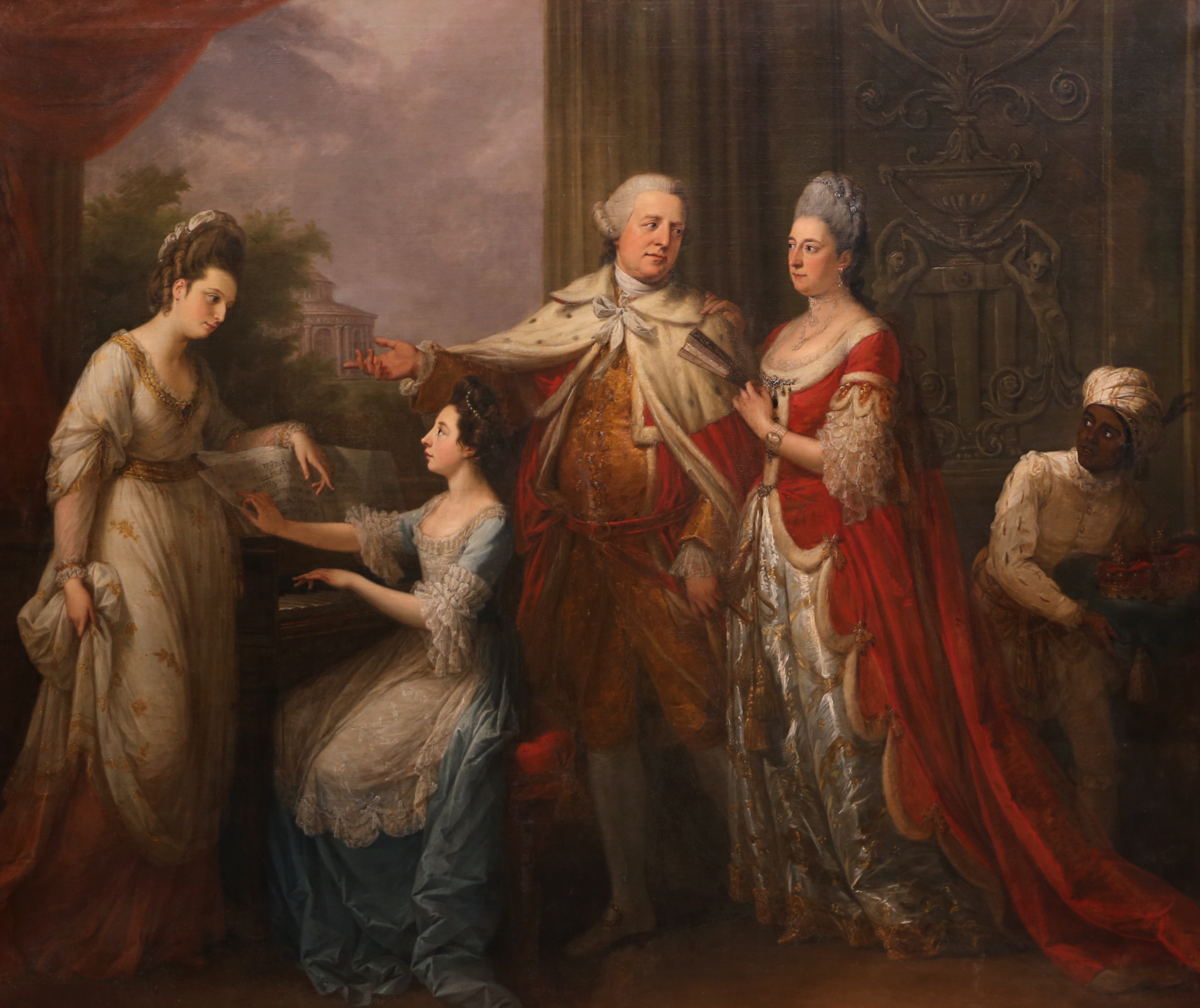
The Ely Family (Angelica Kauffman, 1771) (Note: The painting shows from the left Dolly Monroe, her sister Frances, Loftus and his lady, and "a young black boy from the Malibar Coast" in the opulent splendour of Rathfarnham Castle)

When Townshend became a widower in 1770, Lady Loftus saw an opportunity to secure influence over the king's representative to Ireland by luring him into a honey trap. Two of Lady Loftus's nieces, Dolly Monroe and Anne Montgomery, were guests at Rathfarnham Castle at the time, both of whom were considered amongst the greatest beauties of the age. Townshend had become a daily visitor to the recently refurbished castle, and had shown interest in Dolly Monroe in particular. (Note: Dolly Monroe's admirers included Henry Grattan and Oliver Goldsmith. At the time, she had been seen frequently with Hercules Langrishe, who did not respond well to being rejected by her in favour of Townshend. She married the politician William Richardson, and died without issue in 1793.) Lady Loftus encouraged the match, hinting at future political alignment between Dublin Castle and the Loftus Squadron. (Note: The painting opposite was supervised throughout by Lord Townshend, showing the skill of his subterfuge matched by the gullibility of Lady Loftus.) Loftus himself evidently went along with his wife's intervention and once agreement had actually been reached between Townshend and Loftus, Townshend stopped visiting Rathfarnham Castle and the match collapsed.

Lady Loftus and her niece Dolly were publicly ridiculed, becoming the butt of every wit in Dublin, and every pundit who could wager which of the nieces would become the new Lady Townshend. The whole affair was popularised by Hercules Langrishe, who is attributed as having created a satirical series of letters called History of Barataria published in 1771. Thereafter The Loftus Squadron voted with the Government until Townshend was recalled to England in 1772.

The outcome for Loftus was that he was forced by Townshend to agree to vote against his faithful cousin William Ponsonby, for which he received an Earldom. (Note: Townshend's triumph was short-lived, however, as he had also made promises to the other niece, Anne Montgomery, promises he had no intention of honouring, publicly shaming her. When Townshend had been recalled back to London in 1772, Anne's outraged brother, a noted duellist, pursued him to England and overtook him on horseback, forcing Lord Townshend to a marriage with Anne, which took place in May the following year.)

=== Public restoration ===
While dealing with tough political and personal issues, Henry Loftus kept spending a lot of money to upgrade Rathfarnham Castle. He added new sections, put in larger windows, and replaced the old defensive walls with decorative stone balls and jars.

A painting from Angelica Kauffman show 400 acres of gardens, which included bird enclosures, private zoos, ponds, and small garden buildings. Visitors arrived through a large stone archway by the river. Inside, the house was filled with fancy plaster ceilings designed by famous architects, doors made from expensive imported wood, and furniture from around the world. It was so grand that local wealthy people could pay a silver coin to get permission to tour the house once a week.

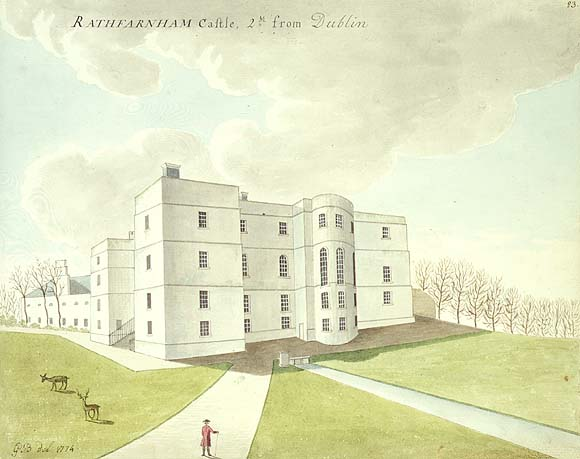
Rathfarnham Castle, painted by Gabriel Beranger in 1774, who was hosted again by Loftus in Loftus Hall 1780

Loftus decided that his Dublin home in Cavendish Row no longer matched his new social status, and set about building a new 36-room mansion, Ely House, at the same time he was refurbishing Rathfarnham Castle. Ely House is located on a plot of land leased in 1770, subsequently named Ely Place, with the new mansion being the first residence to be built on the street. Construction commenced in 1771, in the same year that Loftus commissioned Richard and Charles Frizzel to survey his Loftus Hall estate. At the same time, Loftus constructed a two-story secluded hunting lodge as his grand country retreat on Montpelier Hill, with beautiful views of Dublin and the sea, which he called Dolly mount, after his favourite niece. (Note: With all the work being conducted simultaneously between 1770 and 1774 on Rathfarnham Castle, Ely House and Dolly mount, with Loftus Hall being fully surveyed and maintained, Loftus had decided not to renovate his property in Richfield or the lavish setting of Castle Hume still under dispute in court, even though Loftus considered the house was "justly reckoned among the first rate in Ireland". Loftus's credit had limits.)

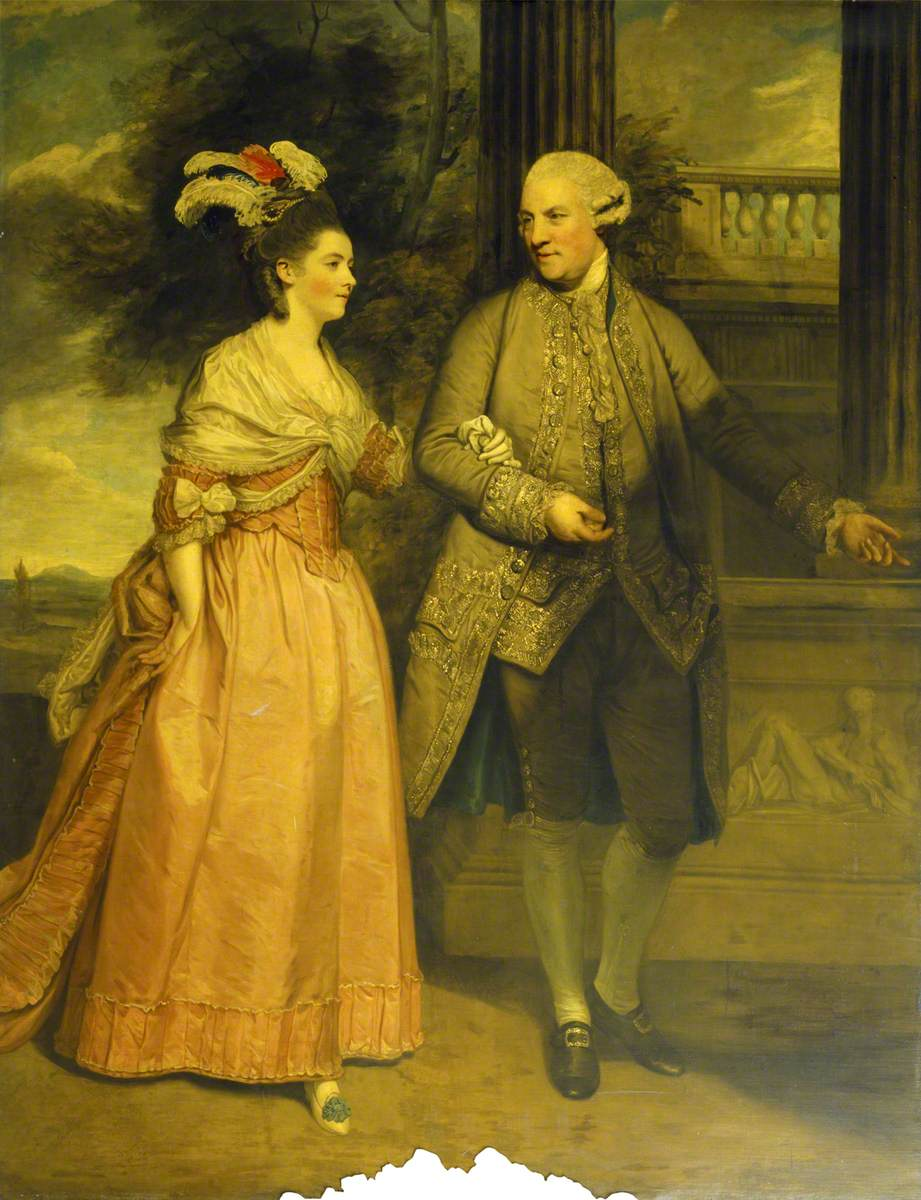
Henry Loftus and his second wife Anne Bonfoy (c.1775), by Joshua Reynolds

Loftus's grandfather had previously comprehensively rebuilt Loftus Hall as an elegant 17th Century House, which meant that Loftus could focus his attention on Ely house. (Note: Loftus hosted Gabriel Beranger at Loftus Hall in 1780 with the house on full display.) In just two years, the new Dublin mansion included outhouses, a coachhouse and stables, all completed a year or two before his wife Frances died in 1774. Almost every room in the house was decorated with exquisite plasterwork with carved marble fireplaces and doors made of "panelled West Indian mahogany, with silver handles and lockplates, pierced and chased". The following year, Loftus married Anne Bonfoy, (Note: daughter of Captain Henry Bonfoy and Anne Eliot, and sister of Edward Craggs-Eliot, 1st Baron Eliot) presenting her with the newly completed Ely House. (Note: Countess Ely continued to live at her home in Ely House long after Loftus's death in 1783. She installed an (eighth) bay at the first floor level upwards in 1785, creating a 60-seat "attic theatre" for her friends' amateur dramatics before selling the house in 1809.)

The next few years were much more relaxed for Loftus, allowing him to bask in social approbation with his new wife. With all major projects completed, political satires forgotten, Loftus had successfully balanced great political influence with inadequate financial resources. Outwardly and by his own testimony, he was very wealthy man. Social acceptance culminated in his appointment as a Knight Founder of the Order of St Patrick. He received the news of his latest honour whilst "taking the waters" at Bath, which he greeted with a combination of pomposity and humour. Loftus died in May 1783 at The Circus in Bath before he could be installed.

== Legacy ==
Loftus's last years of grandiloquence concealed debts totalling £64,000 (in 1783 money) plus crippling annuities. He died, leaving no issue by either marriage, passing his estates and debts to his sister's son Charles Tottenham, who also took on oversight of the Loftus Squadron. (Note: Charles Tottenham took the name and arms to "Loftus" in lieu of the Loftus properties, and traded the Loftus Squadron for a marquessate after 1801.)

Rathfarnham Castle and Ely House are finely preserved examples of Georgian interior design, where people continue to pay and marvel at Loftus's opulent life-style.

== Notes and references ==
=== References ===
Parliament of Ireland
Preceded by George Ogle; Nicholas Hume-Loftus	Member of Parliament for Bannow; 1747–1768; Served alongside: Nicholas Hume-Loftus 1747–1761; Henry Mitchell 1761–1768	Succeeded by Charles Tottenham; Robert Hellen
Preceded by Arthur Gore, Viscount Sudeley; Vesey Colclough	Member of Parliament for County Wexford; 1761–1769; Served alongside: Vesey Colclough	Succeeded by Vesey Colclough; George Ogle
Peerage of Ireland
New creation	Earl of Ely; 1771–1783	Extinct
Preceded by Nicholas Hume-Loftus	Viscount Loftus; 1769–1783	Extinct
