= George Ogle =

Irish politician

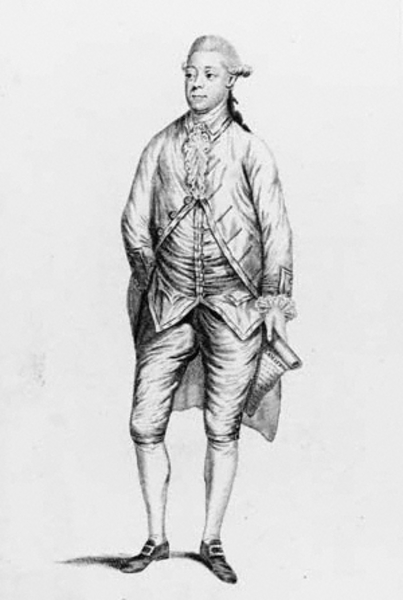
George Ogle

George Ogle (14 October 1742 – 10 August 1814) was an Irish Tory politician.

== Life ==
He was born 14 October 1742, the only child of George Ogle (1704–1746). He was brought up at Rossminoge, near Camolin, County Wexford, under the care of one Miller, vicar of the parish, and was imbued through life with strong Protestant feeling. Ogle received his early education at Kilkenny College.

He had literary tastes and composing, while at Rossminoge, two songs which are still popular.

The earlier, called "Banna's Banks" beginning "Shepherds, I have lost my love", was said to be inspired by Miss Stepney, of Durrow House, Queen's County, afterwards Mrs. Burton Doyne of Wells.

The second, "Moll Ashore", was written to celebrate the charms of Mary Moore, whose sister Elizabeth, daughter of William Moore of Tinrahan, County Wexford, subsequently became his wife. Burns, writing to Thomson 7 April 1793, described Ogle's "Baana`s Banks" as "heavenly" and "certainly Irish"; but it was included in "Songs of Scotland", 1851. A gentleman of wealth and fashion, Ogle appears to have been affluent visitor at Laly Miller's assemblies at Bath, and he contributed to the volume, Poetical Amusements at a Villa near Bath, published by that lady's admirers in 1775. Some songs by him appear in Crofton Croker's Popular Songs of Ireland and in Samuel Lover's Poems and Ballads, where the fine lyric is assigned to him known as Banish Sorrow. He declined to publish any of his poems himself.

In 1768, Ogle was elected to the Irish House of Commons as a member for County Wexford, and he sat for that constituency till 1796. A brilliant speaker, he delighted in 'splendid superlatives and figurative diction, whilst the spirit and energy of his manner corresponded to the glowing warmth of his expressions'. He joined the Whig party, and, although in favour of extending to Ireland popular rights and legislative independence, he was opposed to catholic emancipation, and was a staunch upholder of the established church.

Before 1778, he was challenged to a duel by Barney Coyle, a whisky distiller and member of the catholic board, on the ground that he had publicly said that "a papist could swallow a false oath as easily as a poached egg". Eight shots were exchanged, but the combatants remained unhurt. Ogle declared that the remark which led to the encounter had been misreported, and he had referred not to "papists", but to "rebels". Shortly afterward he publicly stated that

some newspapers had misrepresented his sentiments on a former debate, on bringing in a bill to relax the popery laws, and had put words into his mouth which he never said, particularly that he hated an Irish papist, which was foreign to his thoughts. He hated no man on account of his faith.

In 1779, he attacked Charles James Fox and the opposition in England for not resisting with greater vivacity Lord North's coercive policy in Ireland. Fox wrote to the Duke of Leinster explaining the difficulties of the parliamentary situation at Westminster, and expressed especial regret at Ogle's dissatisfaction "because I have always heard that he is a very honest man and a good whig".

In 1779, Ogle joined the association called the Monks of St. Patrick.

In 1782, he became a colonel in the Irish Volunteers, actively supported that movement, and strongly asserted the claim of Ireland to legislative independence. But when the national convention assembled at Dublin under Lord Charlemont's presidency, in November 1783, Ogle is said to have delivered a message purporting to come from Lord Kenmare to the effect that the Catholics of Ireland were satisfied with the privileges they had already obtained and desired no more. Kenmare at once denied that he had authorised the delivery of such a message.

According to later accounts, Sir Boyle Roche was responsible for the incident, but the contemporary reports saddle Ogle alone with the responsibility for the ruse.

In 1783, Ogle was admitted to the Irish privy council, and in the following year obtained the patent place of registrar of deeds at Dublin, at a salary of £1,300 a year. The step was taken "from some disarrangement of his family affairs, as it is supposed", but his constituents were content, and no difference appeared in his political action. His zeal for wise reform was not diminished, and in April 1786, when the relations of landlords and Protestant clergy to the tenants were under discussion, he described the landlords as "great extortioners".

In 1789, he opposed the English government's proposals for a regency. In February 1793, he denounced Hobart's Catholic Relief Bill, and prophesied that the admission of Catholics to political power must lead either to separation or to a legislative union.

In 1796, when he became governor of Wexford, he retired from the House of Commons and lived mainly on his estate, Bellevue, in County Wexford. But in the disturbed period of 1798, he consented to reenter parliament as a member for Dublin City. Although he voted against the Act of Union in 1800, he was returned to the united parliament of 1801 as the representative of Dublin City, and finally retired in 1804.

He died at Bellevue on 10 August 1814. A statue to his memory, by John Smyth, was placed in St. Patrick's Cathedral, Dublin, at a cost of £130. He had no children.

== Notes ==
Attribution:

- This article incorporates text from a publication now in the public domain: FitzPatrick, William John (1895). "Ogle, George (1742-1814)". In Lee, Sidney (ed.). Dictionary of National Biography. Vol. 42. London: Smith, Elder & Co.

Parliament of Ireland
Preceded by Vesey Colclough; Hon. Henry Loftus	Member of Parliament for County Wexford; 1769–1797; With: Vesey Colclough 1769–1790; Hon. John Loftus 1790–1797	Succeeded by Hon. John Loftus; Abel Ram
Preceded by Arthur Wolfe; John Claudius Beresford	Member of Parliament for Dublin City; 1798 – 1801; Served alongside: John Claudius Beresford	Succeeded by Parliament of the United Kingdom
Parliament of the United Kingdom
New constituency	Member of Parliament for Dublin City; 1801 – 1802	Succeeded by John La Touche
Non-profit organization positions
Preceded by Thomas Verner	Grand Master of the Orange Institution of Ireland; 1801–1818	Succeeded by Mervyn Archdale
