= James Stopford, 2nd Earl of Courtown =

Anglo-Irish peer and Tory politician

James Stopford, 2nd Earl of Courtown KP, PC (Ire) (28 May 1731 – 30 March 1810), known as Viscount Stopford from 1762 to 1770, was an Anglo-Irish peer and Tory politician who sat in the British House of Commons between 1774 and 1793.

Courtown was the eldest son of James Stopford, 1st Earl of Courtown, and his wife Elizabeth (née Smith), and was educated at Trinity College Dublin.

He was elected to the Irish House of Commons for Taghmon in 1761, a seat he held until 1768, and later sat as a Member of the British House of Commons for Great Bedwyn in 1774 and for Marlborough from 1780 to 1793. Between 1784 and 1793 he served as Treasurer of the Household under William Pitt the Younger. Courtown was made a Knight of the Order of St Patrick in 1783 and admitted to the Irish Privy Council in 1784. In 1796 he was further honoured when he was created Baron Saltersford, of Saltersford in the County of Chester, in the Peerage of Great Britain.

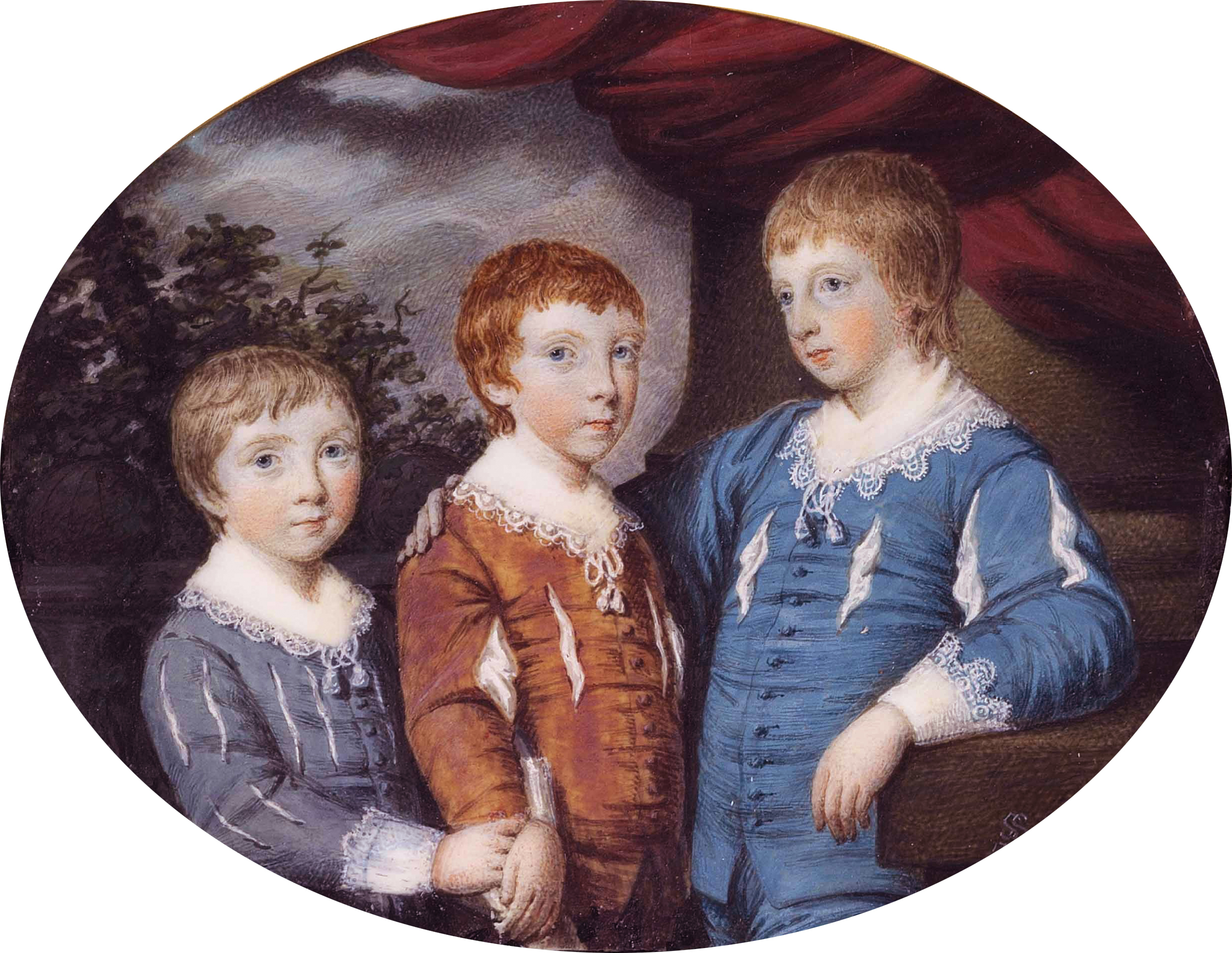
A portrait of his sons; Robert, Edward and James. (Samuel Shelley, 1774)

Lord Courtown married Mary, daughter of Richard Powys, in 1762. They had four sons, who all gained distinction, and a daughter. Their second son the Hon. Sir Edward Stopford (1766–1837) was a Lieutenant-General in the Army. Their third son the Hon. Sir Robert Stopford (1768–1874) was an Admiral of the Red. Their fourth son Reverend the Hon. Richard Bruce Stopford (1774–1844) was Canon of Windsor and Chaplain to Her Majesty Queen Victoria. Lady Courtown died in January 1810. Lord Courtown only survived her by three months and died in March 1810, aged 78. He was succeeded in the earldom by his eldest son James, who also became a prominent Tory politician.

== Notes ==
Parliament of Ireland
Preceded by Charles Gardiner; Walter Hore	Member of Parliament for Taghmon; 1761–1768; Served alongside: Walter Hore	Succeeded by John Hatch; James Willson
Parliament of Great Britain
Preceded by William Burke; Benjamin Hopkins	Member of Parliament for Great Bedwyn; 1774; Served alongside: Paul Methuen	Succeeded by Paul Methuen; Viscount Cranborne
Preceded by Sir James Tylney-Long; James Brudenell	Member of Parliament for Marlborough; 1780–1793; Served alongside: William Woodley 1780–1784; Sir Philip Hales 1783–1790; Thomas Bruce 1790–1793	Succeeded by Thomas Bruce; Earl of Dalkeith
Political offices
Preceded by Charles Greville	Treasurer of the Household; 1784–1793	Succeeded by Viscount Stopford
Peerage of Ireland
Preceded by James Stopford	Earl of Courtown; 1770–1810	Succeeded by James George Stopford
Peerage of Great Britain
New creation	Baron Saltersford; 1796–1810	Succeeded by James George Stopford
