= George Loftus, 7th Marquess of Ely =

George Henry Wellington Loftus, 7th Marquess of Ely (3 September 1903 – 31 May 1969), styled Viscount Loftus between 1925 and 1935, was an Irish soldier and nobleman.

Loftus was born on 3 September 1903 to George Herbert Loftus, 6th Marquess of Ely, by his second wife Ethel Beatrice Lempriere Gresley. He became known by the courtesy title Viscount Loftus when his father succeeded to the marquessate in 1925. He was educated at Lancing College and served as a Major in the North Irish Horse during World War II. He was also High Sheriff of Fermanagh for 1931. In 1935 he succeeded to the marquessate on the death of his father.

Ely married Thea Margaret Gordon Gronvold, daughter of Lars Gronvold and Amy Gordon, in 1928. They had one daughter, Anne, who died in infancy. Ely died in May 1969, aged 65, and was succeeded in the marquessate by his kinsman, Charles Tottenham. Tottenham was the great-great-grandson of Robert Tottenham, bishop, younger brother of John Loftus, 2nd Marquess of Ely, who was the 7th Marquess's great-grandfather.

Peerage of Ireland
| Preceded by George Loftus | Marquess of Ely; 1935–1969 | Succeeded by Charles Tottenham |
