= Thomas Stopford =

Irish Anglican bishop

Thomas Stopford was Bishop of Cork and Ross from 1794 and died in post on 24 January 1805.

He was the son of the first Earl of Courtown. He was Rector of Kiltinel and served as Dean of Killaloe from 1781 to 1787 before being appointed Dean of Ferns in 1787. In 1790 he was made second chaplain to John Fane, 10th Earl of Westmorland.

In 1794 he was elevated to the episcopacy as Bishop of Cork and Ross.

== Notes ==
Church of Ireland titles
Preceded by William Bennet	Bishop of Cork and Ross; 1794 –1805	Succeeded by Lord John Beresford
