= Charles Tottenham, 8th Marquess of Ely =

English-born Canadian educator (1913–2006)

The Most Honourable The Marquess of Ely
- Coat of arms of the Marquess of Ely
- Born: 30 May 1913; Binsted, Hampshire, England
- Died: 1 February 2006 (aged 92); Port Hope, Ontario, Canada
- Spouses: Katherine Craig (m. 1938; died 1975) Elspeth Ann Hay (m. 1978; died 1996)
- Children: 4, including Ann and John

Member of the House of Lords
- Lord Temporal
- as a hereditary peer 31 May 1969 – 11 November 1999
- Preceded by: The 7th Marquess of Ely
- Succeeded by: Seat abolished

Charles John Tottenham, 8th Marquess of Ely (30 May 1913 – 1 February 2006) was an English-born educator and peer. Born in Binsted, Tottenham emigrated to Canada to attend Queen's University at Kingston in the 1930s. First working as an assistant librarian and French teacher at the Royal Military College of Canada, he later was employed to teach languages at Trinity College School in 1937, and four years later was appointed the principal of its junior school, retiring in 1981. Tottenham died in 2006 in Port Hope, Ontario, and was succeeded by his son John as the 9th Marquess of Ely.

== Life and career ==
Tottenham was born on 30 May 1913 in the village of Binsted to George Leonard and Cécile Elizabeth Tottenham. George was a great-grandson of Lord Robert Tottenham, the second son of the 1st Marquess of Ely. Soon after the death of George, Charles and his family were brought by their mother to Geneva. There, he attended the Collège de Genève and the International School of Geneva. His mother moved to Kingston, Ontario, with Charles following suit and attending Queen's University at Kingston in the 1930s.

A title doesn't mean a hell of a lot out here. It doesn't open any doors for you or do anything. It gives the guys at work a few laughs sometimes, but that's about all it does.

— Tottenham's son, Richard, on why he does not use a title in Canada.

At the Royal Military College of Canada, Tottenham became an assistant librarian and French teacher. He later worked as a translator at an insurance company before being employed as a language teacher at Trinity College School in Port Hope, Ontario. He became the principal of its junior school—Boulden House, then named Junior School—in 1941. As principal, he taught Latin, coached association football, and resided in an apartment at Boulden House, continuing even after his retirement as principal in 1981.

Tottenham married Katherine Elizabeth Craig in June 1938. Together, they had four children: Ann, John, Timothy, and Richard. Craig died on 27 January 1975. Tottenham later got engaged to Elspeth Ann Hay in July 1978; they married on 28 December in the Chapel of the Royal Hospital Chelsea.

In 1965, Tottenham was second in line to become Marquess of Ely. Upon the death of Guy Alvo Greville Loftus, Tottenham became the heir presumptive.

On the death of his childless cousin George Loftus, 7th Marquess of Ely, Tottenham became the 8th Marquess of Ely in the Peerage of Ireland on 31 May 1969. The Marquess of Ely is concurrently Baron Loftus, a title of the Peerage of the United Kingdom, entitling the Marquess to a seat in the House of Lords. As a result, Tottenham was eligible to sit in the House as Baron Loftus from his ascension to 11 November 1999, when the House of Lords Act 1999 was passed, excluding all but ninety-two hereditary peers from the House. Tottenham was also the premier marquess of Ireland. Despite he and his children being entitled to use the appellation Lord in his name, they did not while in Canada.

Tottenham died in Port Hope, Ontario, on 1 February 2006 following a brief illness. He was succeeded by John, his eldest son, as the 9th Marquess of Ely.

Peerage of Ireland
Preceded by George Loftus	Marquess of Ely; 1969–2006	Succeeded by John Tottenham
