= Richard Bruce Stopford =

Hon. Richard Bruce Stopford MA (1774 – 12 December 1844) was a Canon of Windsor from 1812 to 1844.

== Family ==
He was the fourth son of James Stopford, 2nd Earl of Courtown. On 19 Nov 1800 he married Eleanor Powys, daughter of Thomas Powys, 1st Baron Lilford and they had the following children:

- George Stopford (born 29 August 1801)
- Eleanor Elizabeth Stopford (4 September 1802 - 12 Oct 1851)
- Richard Henry Stopford (born 22 November 1803)
- Rev. Charles Stopford (19 January 1805 - 10 March 1864)
- William Bruce Stopford-Sackville (1 April 1806 - 29 May 1872)
- James Sydney Stopford (14 April 1808 - 8 July 1885)
- Capt. Edward Stopford (20 August 1809 - 14 October 1895)
- Lucy-Charlotte Stopford (born 16 October 1811)
- Robert Stopford (16 April 1813 - 25 May 1878) married Matilda Caroline Birch Reynardson, on 11 Aug 1853; Ancestor of Eugen Michael Simon (1992-)
- Harriet Jane Stopford (19 September 1816 - 13 December 1902)

== Career ==
He was educated at Christ Church, Oxford where he was awarded BA in 1796, MA in 1799.

He was appointed:

- Rector of Barton Seagrave 1798
- Vicar of Nuneaton 1803
- Prebendary of Bullinghope in Hereford Cathedral 1810–1844
- Chaplain to Queen Victoria

He was appointed to the sixth stall in St George's Chapel, Windsor Castle in 1812, a position he held until 1844.
