= Nicholas Hume-Loftus, 1st Earl of Ely =

Irish politician

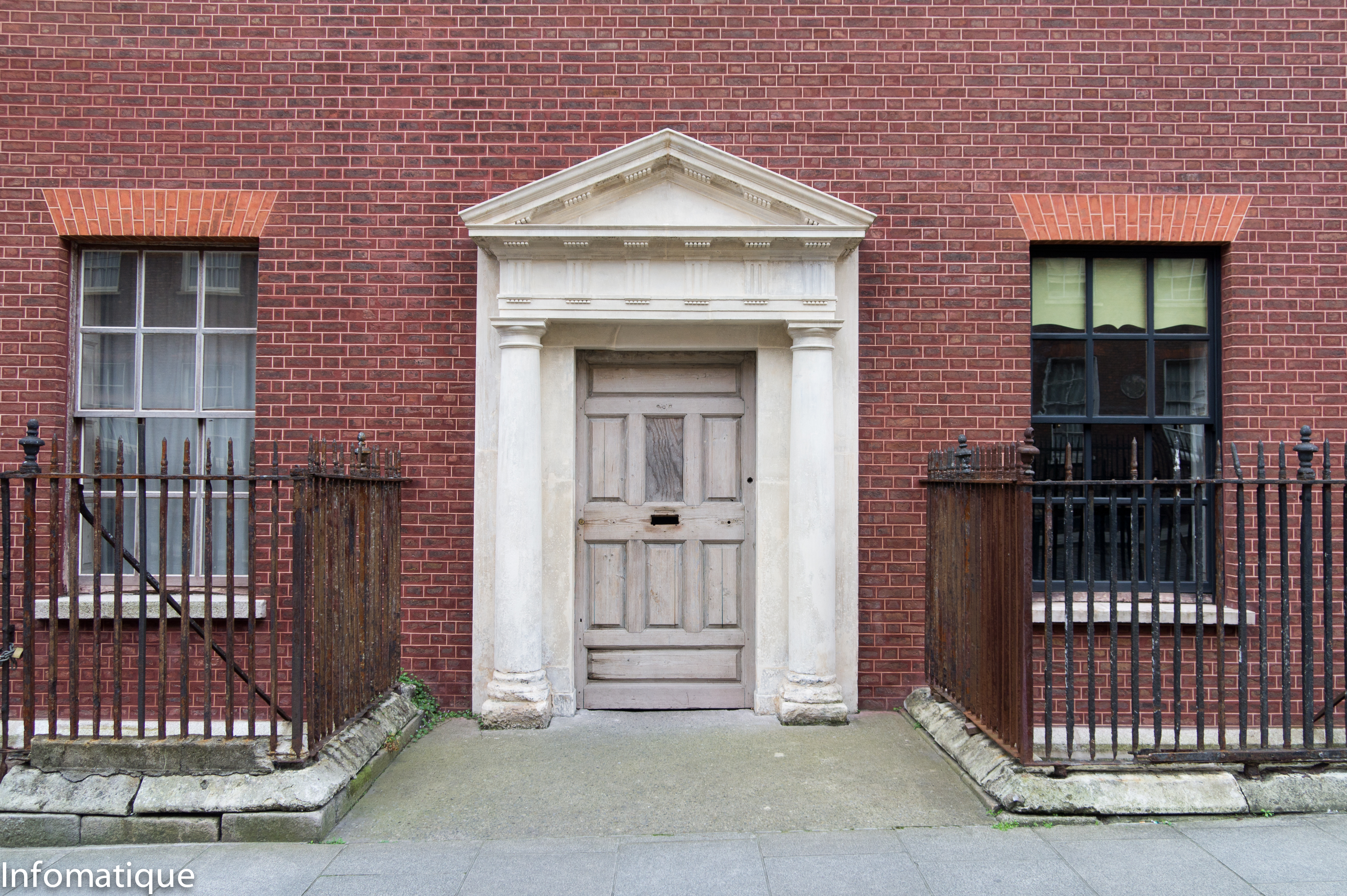
Entrance to Loftus's town house 13 Henrietta Street, Dublin, August 2011

Nicholas Hume-Loftus, 1st Earl of Ely PC (I) (1708 – 31 October 1766) was an Anglo-Irish peer and member of the House of Lords.

He was the son of Nicholas Loftus, 1st Viscount Loftus and Anne Ponsonby, daughter of William Ponsonby, 1st Viscount Duncannon and Mary Moore. He sat in the Irish House of Commons as the Member of Parliament for Bannow from 1736 to 1760 and for Fethard, County Wexford between 1761 and 1763. In 1763 he succeeded to his father's titles and assumed his seat in the Irish House of Lords. In 1764 he was invested as a member of the Privy Council of Ireland. On 23 October 1766 he was created Earl of Ely in County Wicklow in the Peerage of Ireland.

He married Mary Hume, daughter of Sir Gustavus Hume, 3rd Baronet, on 18 August 1736. He was succeeded by his son, Nicholas Hume-Loftus, 2nd Earl of Ely. During the celebrated hearing into the son's mental incapacity, much was said about the ill-treatment he had received from his father.

Parliament of Ireland
Preceded by George Ogle; William Harrison	Member of Parliament for Bannow; 1737–1761; With: George Ogle 1737–1747; Hon. Henry Loftus 1747–1761	Succeeded by Hon. Henry Loftus; Henry Mitchell
Preceded by Nicholas Hume-Loftus; Charles Tottenham	Member of Parliament for Fethard, County Wexford; 1761–1763; With: Nicholas Hume-Loftus	Succeeded by Nicholas Hume-Loftus; William Alcock
Peerage of Ireland
New creation	Earl of Ely; 1766	Succeeded by Nicholas Hume-Loftus
Preceded by Nicholas Loftus	Viscount Loftus; 1763–1766	Succeeded by Nicholas Hume-Loftus
