= Caesar Colclough (1696–1766) =

Member of Parliament for County Wexford

Caesar Colclough (1696–1766) was a Member of Parliament for County Wexford in the Irish House of Commons.
