= Nicholas Loftus, 1st Viscount Loftus =

Anglo-Irish politician

Nicholas Loftus PC (I)
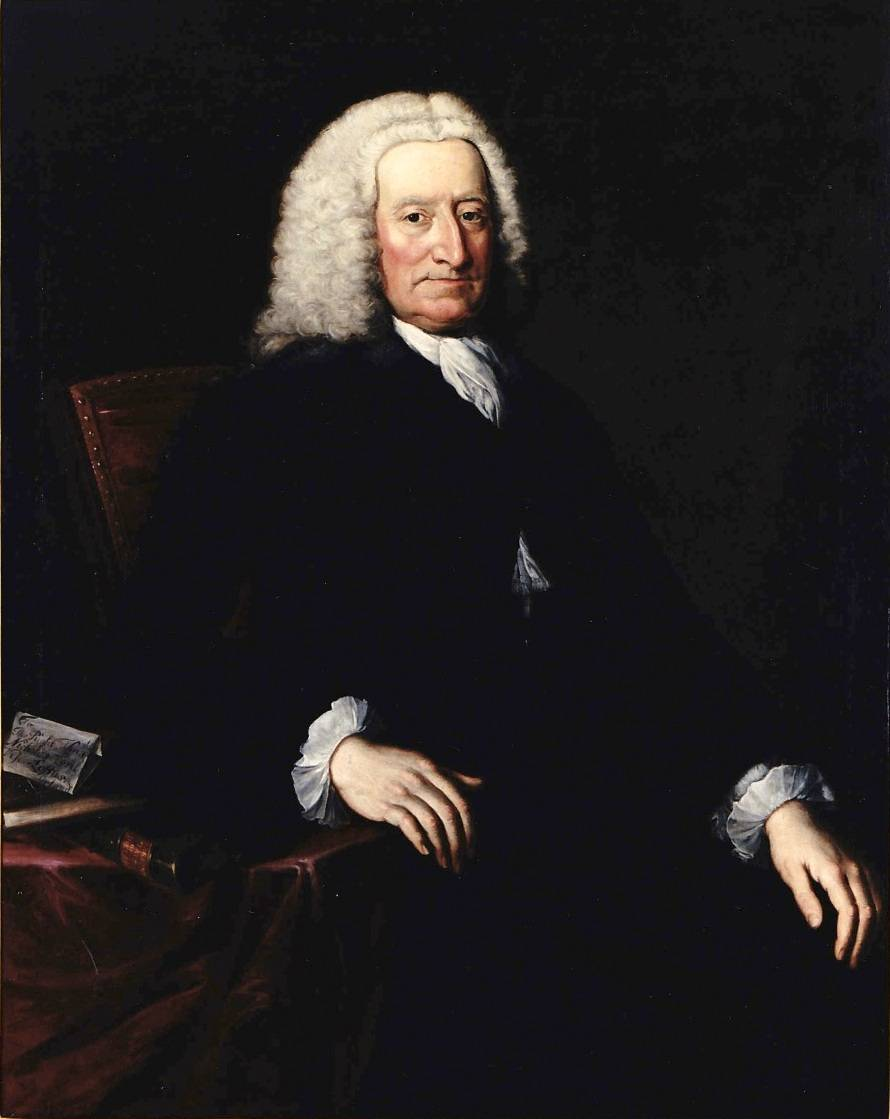

Member of the Irish Parliament for Fethard
- In office 1710–1713

Member of the Irish Parliament for Clonmines
- In office 1713–1715

Member of the Irish Parliament for County Wexford
- In office 1715–1751

Baron Loftus
- In office 1751–1763

Viscount Loftus
- In office 1756–1763

Personal details
- Died: 31 December 1763
- Spouse: Anne Ponsonby
- Children: 7, including Nicholas, Henry, Edward, and Nicholas
- Parent(s): Henry Loftus and Anne Crewkern

Nicholas Loftus, 1st Viscount Loftus PC (I) (c.1687 – 31 December 1763) was an Anglo-Irish politician and peer.

== Biography ==
Loftus was the son of Henry Loftus and Anne Crewkern. He served in the Irish House of Commons as the Member of Parliament for Fethard between 1710 and 1713, Clonmines from 1713 to 1715 and County Wexford between 1715 and 1751. Upon leaving the Commons, Loftus was elevated to the peerage as Baron Loftus, of Loftus Hall in County Wexford in the Peerage of Ireland on 5 October 1751, and assumed his seat in the Irish House of Lords. He was invested as a member of the Privy Council of Ireland in 1753. He was further honoured when he was created Viscount Loftus of Ely in County Wicklow, also a title in the Irish peerage, on 19 July 1756.

He married Hon. Anne Ponsonby, daughter of William Ponsonby, 1st Viscount Duncannon and Mary Moore, in April 1706. They had five children:

- Hon. Mary Loftus (d. 1779)
- Hon. Anne Loftus (d. 10 November 1768)
- Hon. Elizabeth Loftus (d. June 1747) who married Sir John Tottenham, 1st Baronet and was the mother of Charles Loftus, 1st Marquess of Ely
- Nicholas Hume-Loftus, 1st Earl of Ely (1708 - 31 October 1766)
- Henry Loftus, 1st Earl of Ely (18 November 1709 – 8 May 1783)

Loftus also had two illegitimate children by his Irish housekeeper, Mary Hernon:

- Sir Edward Loftus, 1st Baronet (c.1742 - 17 May 1818)
- Colonel Nicholas Loftus

Peerage of Ireland
| New creation | Viscount Loftus; 1756–1763 | Succeeded by Nicholas Hume-Loftus |
| New creation | Baron Loftus; 1751–1763 | Succeeded by Nicholas Hume-Loftus |
