= Nicholas Hume-Loftus, 2nd Earl of Ely =

Nicholas Hume-Loftus

2nd Earl of Ely
- In office 1766–1769

Member of the Irish Parliament for Fethard
- In office 1759–1766

Personal details
- Born: 11 September 1739
- Died: 12 November 1769 (aged 30)
- Parent: Nicholas Hume-Loftus, 1st Earl of Ely (father)

Nicholas Hume-Loftus, 2nd Earl of Ely (11 September 1738 – 12 November 1769) was an Anglo-Irish peer, briefly styled Viscount Loftus in October 1766.

He represented the constituency of Fethard, County Wexford in the Parliament of Ireland from 1759 to 1766.

He was the subject of a notorious legal case regarding his mental capabilities. Family members testified that he was of normal intelligence, and that any eccentric behaviour should be blamed on his father's ill-treatment of him.

He became Earl of Ely on the death of his father, Nicholas Hume-Loftus, 1st Earl of Ely, in 1766, and assumed his seat in the Irish House of Lords. When he died the earldom became extinct but his other titles were inherited by his uncle, Henry Loftus, 1st Earl of Ely.

Parliament of Ireland
Preceded by James Stopford; Charles Tottenham	Member of Parliament for Fethard, County Wexford; 1759–1766; With: Charles Tottenham 1759–1761; Hon. Nicholas Hume-Loftus 1761–1763; William Alcock 1764–1766	Succeeded by William Alcock; John Tottenham
Peerage of Ireland
Preceded by Nicholas Hume-Loftus	Earl of Ely; 1766–1769	Extinct
Preceded by Nicholas Hume-Loftus	Viscount Loftus; 1766–1769	Succeeded by Henry Loftus
