= John Loftus, 5th Marquess of Ely =

John Henry Loftus, 5th Marquess of Ely (6 March 1851 – 18 December 1925) was an Irish nobleman.

He was the eldest son of Rev. Lord Adam Loftus (1816–1866), rector of Magheraculmoney, and his wife Margaret Fannin (d. 1902). He was declared bankrupt on 23 October 1878.

Loftus succeeded his first cousin as Marquess of Ely in 1889. On 21 November 1895, he married Margaret Emma Clark (d. 1931). They had no children. He died in 1925 and was succeeded by his younger brother, George Loftus, 6th Marquess of Ely. He is buried in the municipal cemetery at Great Malvern, Worcestershire.

Peerage of Ireland
Preceded by John Loftus	Marquess of Ely; 1889–1925	Succeeded by George Loftus
Peerage of the United Kingdom
Preceded by John Loftus	Baron Loftus; 1889–1925	Succeeded by George Loftus
