= Loftus Hall =

Country house in County Wexford, Ireland

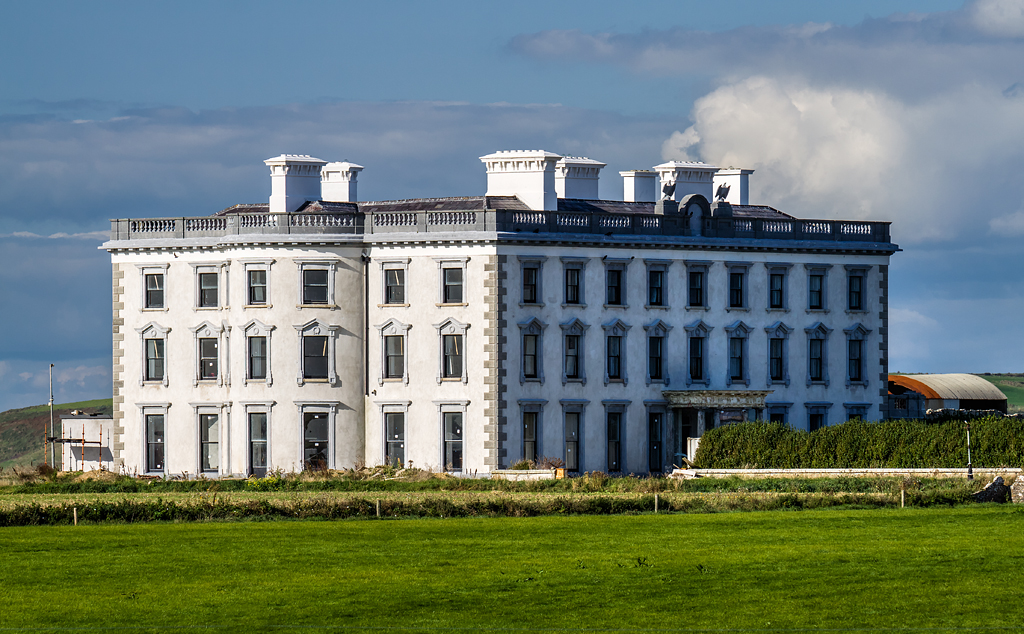
- Loftus Hall, September 2023
- Interactive map of the Loftus Hall area
- Former names: The Hall, Redmond's Hall

General information
- Location: Hook Head, County Wexford, Ireland
- Coordinates: 52.1487°N 6.9106°W
- Elevation: 15 metres (49 ft)
- Completed: 1870–75
- Opened: 1350; 676 years ago

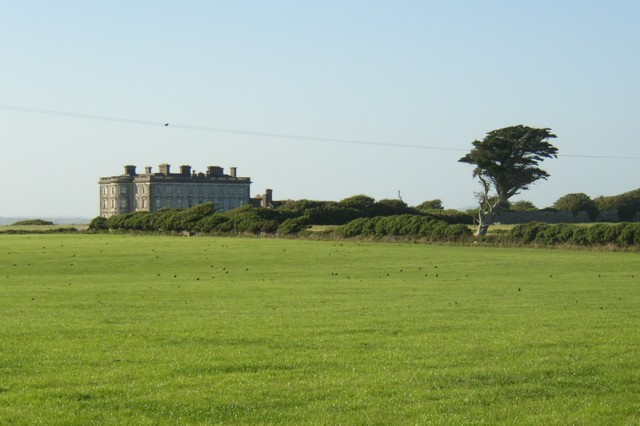
Loftus Hall, near Templetown, Co. Wexford

Loftus Hall is a large country house on the Hook peninsula, County Wexford, Ireland. Built on the site of the original Redmond Hall, it is said to have been haunted by the devil and the ghost of a woman.

Loftus Hall has a long history of ownership, through private residence, landlords, two different orders of nuns, and a hotel in the 1980s run by members of the Devereux family.

Purchased by Shane and Aidan Quigley in 2011, Loftus Hall was opened to the public in 2012 with guided tours of the house and a fully restored walled gardens. It was closed in 2020 and sold in 2021. By 2022, it was under renovation and not open to the public. As of late 2025, it has been listed as sold.

== Redmond Hall ==
In 1170 Raymond FitzGerald landed at what is now known as Baginbun, named after his two ships La Bague et La Bonne, where he was to fight an important battle to safeguard the arrival of Richard de Clare, 2nd Earl of Pembroke, to Ireland. He acquired land in the area in County Wexford, upon which he built a castle known as Houseland Castle. The Redmond family replaced their original castle with another in about 1350, during the time of the Black Death. This second castle was also known as Redmond's Hall.

== Irish Confederate Wars ==
During the Irish Confederate Wars, which broke out in 1641, Redmond's Hall was the scene of a skirmish in 1642. An Irish Army garrison of 100 soldiers under the command of Lord Esmonde were stationed at a fort in Duncannon next to the Waterford Harbour. On 23 February 1642, the garrison was reinforced by 200 soldiers under the command of captains Anthony Weldon and Thomas Aston along with six cannons. Four months later on 19 June, a detachment of soldiers from the fort on their way to Tintern were attacked by Irish Confederate rebels led by Major James Butler near Shielbaggan. Butler's men routed the Irish Army and forced them to retreat back to the fort. Redmond's Hall, which was clearly visible to the beleaguered garrison at Duncannon, was owned at the time by Alexander Redmond, who was known to be sympathetic to the rebels and had provided them with aid.

Aston believed that Redmond's Hall could be easily taken and on 20 July 1642 set sail from Duncannon with around 90 Irish Army troops and two small cannon, landing nearby. Although he was 68-years old, Alexander Redmond barricaded the hall and prepared to defend it. He was assisted by his sons, Robert and Michael, four of his tenants, two men at arms and an itinerant tailor who happened to be at work in the hall when the attack took place. The defenders numbered 10 in all and were armed with long-barrelled fowling pieces. Aston drew his men up in front of the building and demanded admission in the name of King Charles I. Redmond retorted that Aston was welcome to come in providing that he left his soldiers and weapons outside. A lengthy firefight ensued. Aston discovered that his cannon were too small to make much impression on the main door. To add to his troubles, about half his men abandoned him to pillage the countryside. As the fight dragged on a thick sea-mist descended on the Hook Peninsula.

Meanwhile, a force of Confederate rebels, led by captains Rossiter and Thomas Roche, were encamped at Shielbaggan. Hearing of Aston's attack they marched rapidly to the aid of the defenders and surprised the attackers under cover of the fog. About 30 attackers escaped to their boats and back to the fort, while Aston and several of his men were killed. Several other soldiers of the Irish Army, including Lord Esmonde's nephews John Esmonde and Walter Esmonde, were taken prisoner. Several of the prisoners were summarily hanged the following day on Roche's orders, probably at Ballyhack. On 20 August, 11 other prisoners of war were hanged at New Ross, including one of Esmonde's nephews.

== Dispossession and change of ownership ==
The official Redmond family pedigree (registered in the Ulster Office, Dublin Castle 1763) alleges that Alexander Redmond had to defend the hall one or even two more times against soldiers of Oliver Cromwell in the autumn of 1649 during the Cromwellian conquest of Ireland. There is a tradition that the defenders used sacks of wool to block up breaches in the walls created by enemy cannon. These woolsacks and a representation of the hall can be seen in the coat of arms issued to one of their members in 1763. It is alleged that Alexander Redmond received favourable terms from Cromwell and died in the hall in 1650 or 1651 after which his surviving family were evicted, allowed only to retain a third of their original estates in County Wexford.

The Loftus family were English planters who had owned land in the area from around 1590 when Sir Dudley Loftus was granted the lands around Kilcloggan. Nicholas Loftus acquired the manor of Fethard-on-Sea in 1634 and Fethard Castle became the family residence, that was afterwards occupied by the Redmond family after they were evicted from the house which is now Loftus Hall. After the end of Cromwell's campaign, Nicholas Loftus was given extensive lands in the south of County Wexford and purchased the hall from 'several Adventurers and soldiers', but it was only in 1666 when his son Henry moved to the hall from Dungulph that it became the principal residence of the Loftus family. To establish the new name of his property, he had the following inscription inscribed in stone on the entrance piers at Portersgate: 'Henry Loftus of Loftus Hall Esq. 1680'. Nonetheless, the old name remained in use till the end of the century. In 1684, Henry Loftus carried out extensive repairs to Loftus Hall, which needed repairing after the turbulent events of the previous decades. The Loftus family rose in the peerage in the next generation, with Henry Loftus's grandson Lord Loftus conducting a full survey of his family seat in 1771. In 1800, the then owner of the hall, Charles Loftus, Baron Loftus, was created Marquess of Ely. It was his descendant, John Loftus, 4th Marquess of Ely, who between 1872 and 1884, refurbished the old hall, and used the existing structure, resulting in the present house.

The Redmond family had disputed the claim of the Loftus family in court but without success. In 1684, they were compensated with lands in the Barony of Ballaghkeene in the north of County Wexford. Some of their descendants joined the movement of the Wild Geese and served in a number of foreign armies, most notably that of France. Others were involved in banking and politics, and became a local political dynasty in the nineteenth and twentieth centuries in support of the Irish Party of Isaac Butt and Charles Stuart Parnell. The most notable of these was John Redmond who led the party till his death in 1918.

== Later developments ==
Between 1872 and 1884, John Henry Wellington Graham Loftus, 4th Marquess of Ely (1849–1889), under the guidance of his mother Lady Jane Hope Vere Loftus (Lady in Waiting to Queen Victoria), undertook an extensive rebuilding of the entire mansion, adding several elements such as the grand staircase, mosaic tiled floor, elaborate parquet flooring and technical elements which had not been seen in houses in Ireland at the time, such as flushing toilets and blown air heating. Some of Lord Ely's inspiration was taken from Osborne House, the Queen's summer residence on the Isle of Wight. The extensive works were believed to have been undertaken to facilitate a visit from the Queen, but this didn't happen and the family never got to fully enjoy the house, with the 4th Marquess dying very young without issue and leaving the estate, in a poor financial state, to his cousin who eventually elected to place it on the market, classed as a three-storey non-basement mansion, nine bays to the front with a balustraded parapet. In 1917, Loftus Hall was bought by the Sisters of Providence and turned into a convent and a school for young girls interested in joining the order. In 1983, it was purchased by Kay and Michael Devereaux who opened it as "Loftus Hall Hotel", which operated until its closure in the late 1990s.

In 2011, the house was purchased by the Quigley family. In more recent times the hall had been run as a tourist attraction with guided tours of the property and seasonal events, with some visitors taking part in paranormal investigations following Ghost Adventures with Zak Bagans, Aaron Goodwin and Nick Groff. The gothic thriller The Lodgers was shot on location at Loftus Hall in 2016 and premiered at the 2017 Toronto International Film Festival.

The hall was put on the market in 2020.

The name 'Loftus Hall' or 'Loftushall' is also applied to the townland surrounding the mansion. The entire townland of Loftus Hall, including the building itself, can be seen from Hook Lighthouse.

== Ghost stories ==
Charles Tottenham became Lord of the manor (having to adopt the Loftus name to inherit lands and title as per instructions of Nicolas Loftus 1752) by marrying the Honourable Anne Loftus, daughter of the first Viscount Loftus. They had six children, four boys and two girls – Elizabeth and Anne. However, his wife became ill and died while the girls were still young. Two years later, Tottenham married his cousin Jane Cliffe, and they lived together, along with Anne, in Loftus Hall.

One evening in 1775, Charles was resting in his home with his second wife and daughter from his first marriage, Anne, while the Loftus family were away on business. During a storm, a ship unexpectedly arrived at the Hook Peninsula, where the mansion was located. A young man was welcomed into the mansion. Anne and the young man became very close. One night, the family and mysterious man were in the game room playing cards. In the game each player received three cards, apart from Anne who was only dealt two by the mystery man. A butler serving the Tottenham family at the table was just about to question the man when Anne bent down to pick up another card from the floor, which she must have dropped. It is said that when Anne bent down to pick up the card, she looked beneath the table and saw that the mysterious man had a cloven foot.

It was then that Anne stood up and said to the man: "You have a cloven foot!" The man went up through the roof in a ball of flames, leaving behind a large hole in the ceiling. Anne became mentally ill and never recovered from her ordeal. In the story, the family became ashamed of Anne and locked her away in her favourite room – where she would be happy, yet out of everyone's view – which was known as the Tapestry Room. She refused food and drink, and sat with her knees under her chin, looking out the Tapestry Room window and across the sea to where Dunmore East is today, waiting for her mysterious stranger to return, until she died in the Tapestry Room in 1775. According to the story, the family could not straighten her body as her muscles had seized, and she was buried in the same sitting position in which she had died.

== Media representations ==
A partially independent documentary film was made by Waterford man Rick Whelan, which was released in 1993 as The Legend of Loftus Hall. This film details the story, dramatising certain parts, such as the card game, with actors.

A further feature film, simply titled Loftus Hall, was announced in early 2006 and development began on the project in 2007. Actors Keith Duffy, Samantha Mumba and Adelaide Clemens were reportedly in talks at various stages to appear in the film. Samantha Mumba appeared in Dublin in January 2010 to promote the film. Duffy reportedly left the project midway through 2010 due to prior contractual commitments that would have interfered with the film's proposed schedule. In a 2010 interview at the launch party of Frilogy.com, Samantha Mumba stated that details on Loftus Hall were being kept top secret. After suffering financial difficulties throughout 2010 that stalled the production, it was announced during a questions and answers session at the 2011 Galway Film Fleadh that funding had been secured and the project was being completely rebooted to make it much darker and grittier. The release date was originally set as 1 October 2012, which was later pushed back to 2013.

Loftus Hall was the inspiration for Fowl Manor, one of the primary settings of the franchise Artemis Fowl, author Eoin Colfer having worked there as a child. Elements of Loftus Hall, including the exterior, the main banqueting hall, and the grand staircase also left their mark on the design of Toad Hall in the award-winning stop motion animated The Wind in the Willows (1983 film).
