= Adam Loftus, 1st Viscount Lisburne =

Anglo-Irish peer and military commander

Adam Loftus, 1st Viscount Lisburne (1647 – 15 September 1691) was an Anglo-Irish peer and military commander.

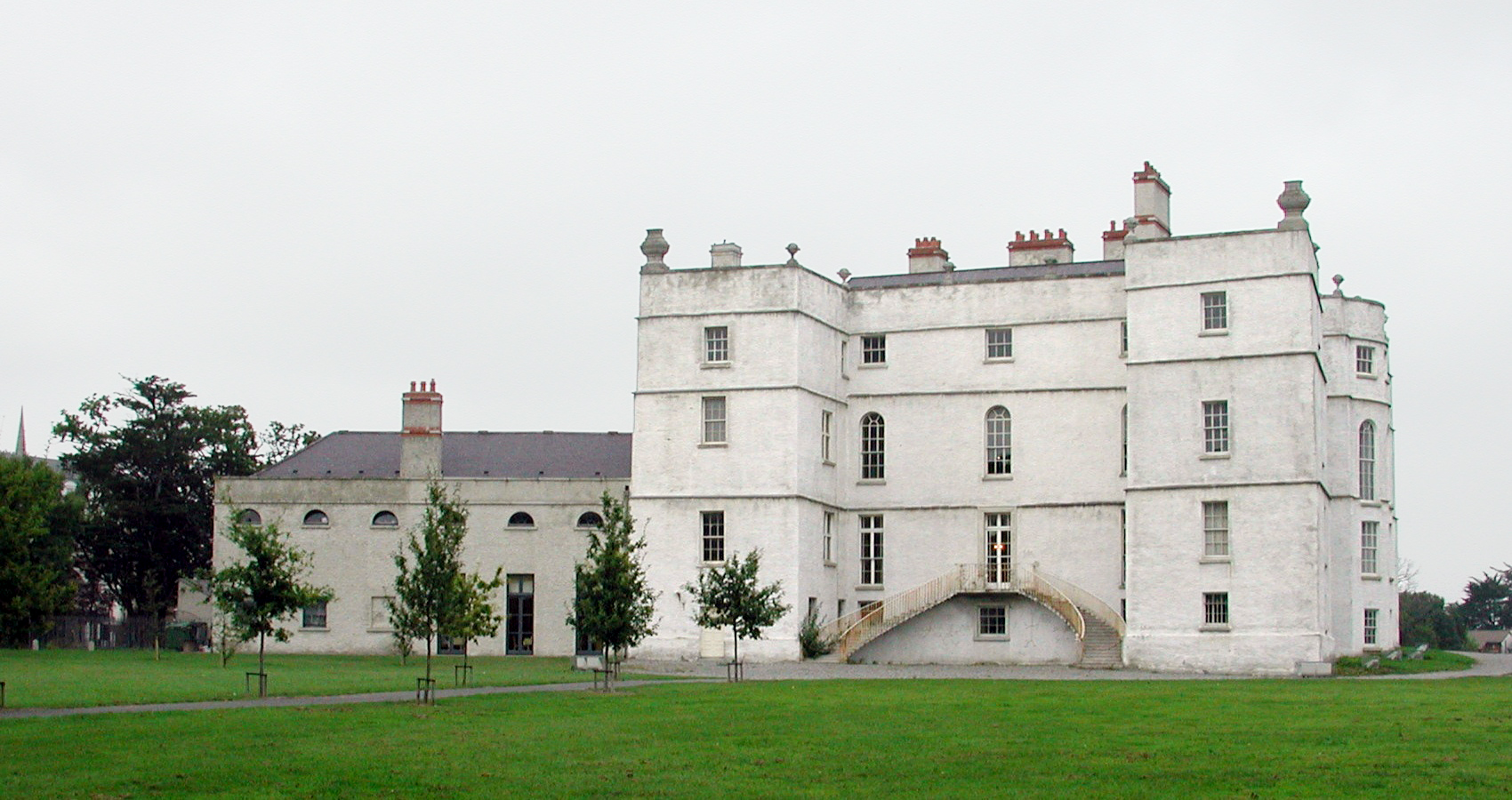
Rathfarnham Castle, County Dublin - the Loftus family seat

He was the second son of Sir Arthur Loftus of Rathfarnham, co. Dublin and Lady Dorothy Boyle, daughter of Richard Boyle, 1st Earl of Cork. His paternal grandfather was Adam Loftus.

He was Ranger of Phoenix Park and of the King's parks in Ireland and a Master of the Court of Requests. From 1685 he was a member of the Privy Council of Ireland and on 29 January 1686, King James II created him Baron of Rathfarnham and Viscount Lisburne in the Peerage of Ireland. A Roman Catholic, he nevertheless took the Whig side in the Glorious Revolution and in 1689 commanded an English regiment in Ireland as the first Colonel of the 39th (Dorsetshire) Regiment of Foot.

On 15 September 1691 he was killed by a cannonball at the Siege of Limerick. He had married twice: firstly Lucy, the second daughter of George Brydges, 6th Baron Chandos, with whom he had a daughter, Lucy and secondly Dorothy, the daughter of Patrick Allen. He had no heir and thus both titles became extinct. His daughter Lucy married Thomas Wharton, 1st Marquess of Wharton who it is generally thought wrote the words of Liliburlero, and despite his notoriously debauched lifestyle, was a dominant force in English politics from the 1690s to his death in 1715.

Peerage of Ireland
New creation	Viscount Lisburne; 1686–1691	Extinct
