= George Ogle (translator) =

English author and translator

George Ogle (1704 – 20 October 1746) was an English author, known as a translator.

== Life ==
He was the second son of Samuel Ogle (1659–1719), a Member of Parliament for Berwick, and commissioner of the revenue for Ireland, and Ursula, his second wife. Ursula was the daughter of Sir Robert Markham, 2nd Baronet, and widow of Altham Annesley, 1st Baron Altham. His elder brother was Samuel Ogle, the colonial governor of Maryland was.

He was elected to the Irish House of Commons as the member for Bannow in 1727, sitting until his death.

Ogle died on 20 October 1746.

== Works ==
Ogle's translations from Anacreon appeared as an appendix to James Sterling's Loves of Hero and Leander (1728), from the Greek of Musæus. The volume was dedicated to Ogle, who went on to publish other translations:

- Basia; or the Kisses, 1731.
- Epistles of Horace imitated, 1735.
- The Legacy Hunter. The fifth satire of the second book of Horace imitated, 1737.
- The Miser's Feast. The eighth satire of the second book of Horace imitated, a dialogue between the author and the poet-laureate,’ 1737.

Other works were:

- Antiquities explained. Being a Collection of figured Gems, illustrated by similar descriptions taken from the Classics (1737), dedicated to the Duke of Dorset, and based on volume I of a similar collection published in Paris in 1732, Recueil de pierres gravées antiques by Michel Philippe Lévesque de Gravelle.
- Gualtherus and Griselda, or the clerk of Oxford's Tale (1739).
- Contributions to Tales of Chaucer modernised by several hands (1741). Ogle covered the prologues and seven of the Canterbury Tales. He also supplied a continuation of the squire's tale from the fourth book of Edmund Spenser's Faerie Queene, later issued separately as Cambuscan, or the Squire's Tale (1785).

== Family ==
Ogle married Frances, the daughter and coheiress of Sir Thomas Twysden, 4th Baronet. Their only child was George Ogle the politician.

== Notes ==
Attribution

This article incorporates text from a publication now in the public domain: Lee, Sidney, ed. (1895). "Ogle, George (1704-1746)". Dictionary of National Biography. Vol. 42. London: Smith, Elder & Co.
