= County Wexford (Parliament of Ireland constituency) =

Pre-1801 Irish constituency

- Former county constituency for the Irish House of Commons
- County: County Wexford

–1801
- Seats: 2
- Replaced by: County Wexford (UKHC)

County Wexford was a constituency represented in the Irish House of Commons until its abolition on 1 January 1801.

== Members of Parliament ==
- 1376: Richard Whittey and William de St John were elected to come to England to consult with the king and council about the government of Ireland and about an aid for the king.
- 1378: John Whittey (did not appear because he was an outlaw)
- 1560: William Hore of Harperstown and Richard Synnott of Ballybrennane
- 1613–1615: James Furlonge (died and replaced by Walter Synnott) and Thomas Wadding
- 1634–1645: William Esmond of Johnstown and Marcus Cheevers
- 1639–1649: Sir Arthur Loftus and Nicholas Loftus
- 1661–1666: Thomas Scott (expelled and replaced 1665 by Richard Kenney of Edermys) and John Warren

=== 1689–1801 ===
| Election | First MP | Second MP |
|---|---|---|
| 1689 | Walter Butler | Patrick Colclough |
| 1692 | Sir John Ivory | Philip Savage |
| 1695 | Mathew Forde | Philip Savage |
| 1709 | William Hore | Philip Savage |
| 1713 | James Stopford | Philip Savage |
| 1715 | James Stopford | Nicholas Loftus |
| 1721 | James Stopford | Nicholas Loftus |
| 1727 | Caesar Colclough | Nicholas Loftus |
| 1751 | Caesar Colclough | Arthur Jones-Nevill |
| 1755 | Caesar Colclough | Robert Leigh |
| 1755 | Caesar Colclough | Andrew Ram |
| 1761 | Caesar Colclough | Hon. Arthur Saunders Gore |
| 1766 | Vesey Colclough | Hon. Arthur Saunders Gore |
| 1768 | Vesey Colclough | Hon. Henry Loftus |
| 1769 | Vesey Colclough | George Ogle |
| 1790 | Hon. John Loftus | George Ogle |
| 1798 | Hon. John Loftus | Abel Ram |
| 1801 | Replaced by Westminster constituency County Wexford | |

== Sources ==
- Clarke, Maude V. (1932–34). "William of Windsor in Ireland, 1369-1376". Proceedings of the Royal Irish Academy: Archaeology, Culture, History, Literature. 41: 55–130. JSTOR 25515963.
