= Arthur Loftus (politician, died 1665) =

Anglo-Irish politician and landowner

Sir Arthur Loftus (died 27 May 1665) was an Anglo-Irish politician and landowner.

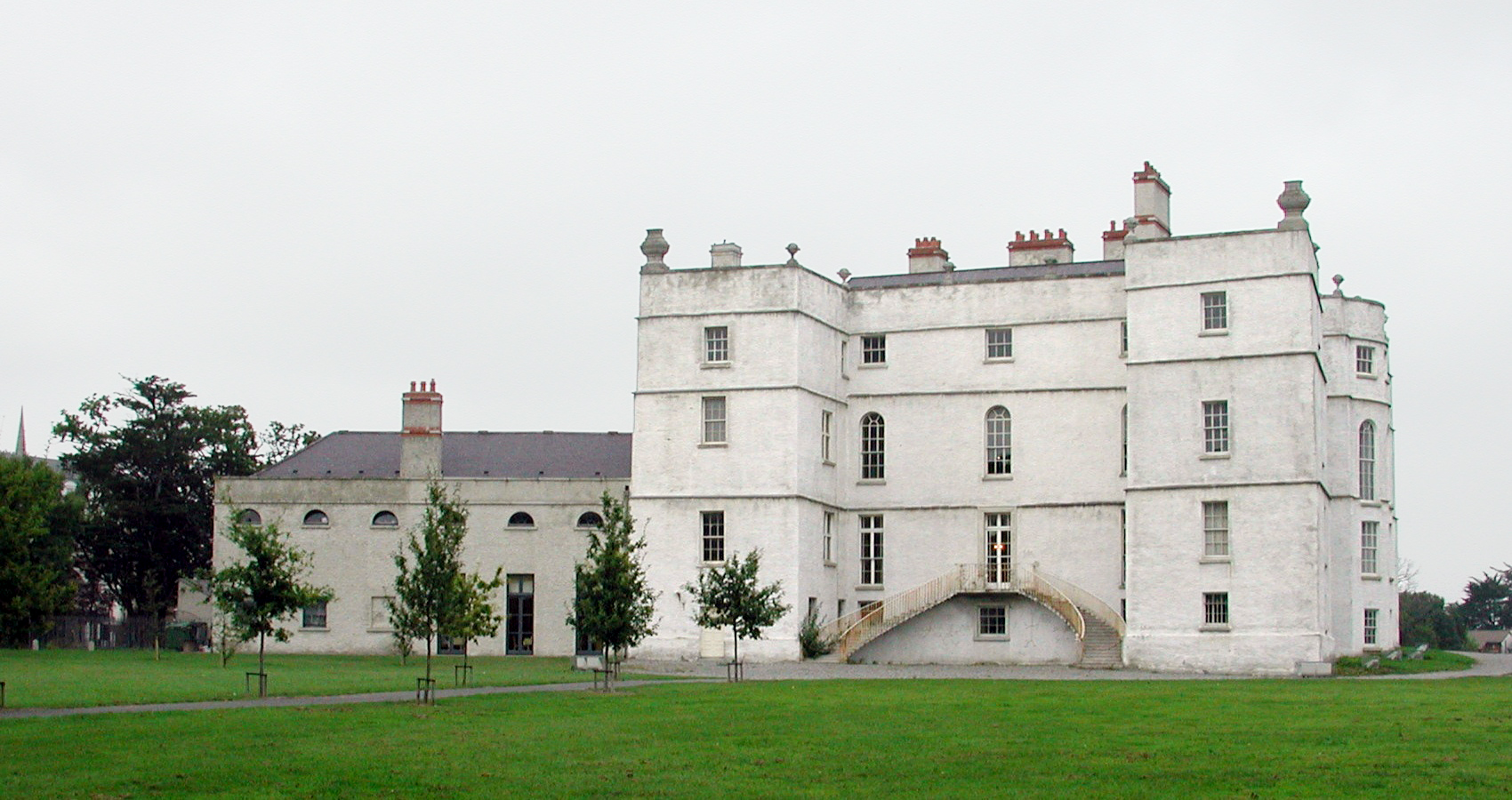
Rathfarnham Castle, County Dublin, the Loftus family seat

He was the son of Sir Adam Loftus and Jane Vaughan. His grandfather was Sir Dudley Loftus. He served as the Member of Parliament for County Wexford in the 1639–49 parliament and was Provost Marshal of Ulster. He was knighted by Charles II. He lived at Rathfarnham, County Dublin.

Loftus married Lady Dorothy Boyle, daughter of Richard Boyle, 1st Earl of Cork and Catherine Fenton, in 1627. However, the Earl of Cork in his diaries records their marriage on Shrove Monday, 13 February 1632 (1631 Old Style). Their son was Adam Loftus, 1st Viscount Lisburne and their daughter, Lettice, married Humphrey Coningsby.
