= Sir Edward Loftus, 1st Baronet =

Anglo-Irish politician (died 1818)

Sir Edward Loftus, 1st Baronet (c.1742 – 17 May 1818) was an Anglo-Irish politician.

Loftus was the illegitimate son of Nicholas Loftus, 1st Viscount Loftus by a woman with the surname of Phillips. He was educated at Kilkenny College. Loftus served as the Member of Parliament for Jamestown in the Irish House of Commons between 1761 and 1768. On 16 July 1768, he was created a baronet, of Mount Loftus in the Baronetage of Ireland. He was High Sheriff of Tyrone in 1777 and High Sheriff of Wexford in 1784.

On 18 March 1758 he married Anne Read, with whom he had four children, two of whom survived to adulthood.

Baronetage of Ireland
New creation	Baronet (of Mount Loftus); 1768–1818	Succeeded by Nicholas Loftus
