= Lord Robert Tottenham =

Irish Anglican Bishop

The Rt Revd Lord Robert Tottenham DD MA

Bishop of Killaloe and Kilfenora
- In office 1804–1820

Bishop of Ferns and Leighlin
- In office 1820–1822

Bishop of Clogher
- In office 1822–1850

Personal details
- Born: 5 September 1773
- Died: 28 April 1850 (aged 76)
- Spouse: Hon. Alicia Maude
- Education: Christ Church, Oxford

Robert Ponsonby Tottenham (5 September 1773 – 28 April 1850; Robert Ponsonby Loftus until 1806) was an Irish Anglican Bishop in the first half of the 19th century.

He was born the younger son of Charles Loftus, 1st Marquess of Ely and Jane Myhill, daughter of Robert Myhill of Killarney, in Woodstock, County Wicklow on 5 September 1773 and educated at Christ Church, Oxford. He was Precentor of Cashel from 1798 until 1804 when he was elevated to the episcopate as Bishop of Killaloe and Kilfenora. Upon his father's death, he inherited the family's Tottenham Green estate, changing his surname back to the older family name of Tottenham. In 1820 he was translated to Ferns and two years later to Clogher, where he replaced the disgraced Bishop Jocelyn. He died in post on 28 April 1850.

He married the Hon. Alicia Maude, daughter of Cornwallis Maude, 1st Viscount Hawarden and his third wife Anne Monck, and had numerous children of whom seven reached adult life, including the youngest, George Tottenham, Dean of Clogher 1900-03.

There is a memorial tablet to him in Clogher Cathedral.

Church of England titles
| Preceded by Nathaniel Alexander | Bishop of Killaloe and Kilfenora; 1804–1820 | Succeeded by Richard Mant |
| Preceded by Percy Jocelyn | Bishop of Ferns and Leighlin; 1820–1822 | Succeeded by Thomas Elrington |
| Preceded by Percy Jocelyn | Bishop of Clogher; 1822–1850 | Succeeded by Archbishops of Armagh |
