= Peerage of Ireland =

Titles of nobility in Ireland

The peerage of Ireland consists of those titles of nobility created by the English monarchs in their capacity as Lord or King of Ireland, or later by monarchs of the United Kingdom of Great Britain and Ireland. (Note: With the establishment of the United Kingdom of Great Britain and Ireland, the separate title "King of Ireland" ceased.) Originally an element in the constitution of Ireland, with peers holding seats in the Irish House of Lords, it is now seen as one of the peerages in the United Kingdom. The creation of such titles came to an end in the 19th century.

The ranks of the Irish peerage are duke, marquess, earl, viscount, and baron. As of 2016, there were 135 extant peerages in the peerage of Ireland: two dukedoms, ten marquessates, 43 earldoms, 28 viscountcies, and 52 baronies.

The United Kingdom now includes only part of the island of Ireland, namely Northern Ireland, and Irish titles are not officially recognised by the Republic of Ireland, with Article 40.2 of the Constitution of Ireland forbidding the state conferring titles of nobility and stating that an Irish citizen may not accept titles of nobility or honour except with the prior approval of the Irish government.

In the following table, each peer is listed only by his highest Irish title, showing higher or equal titles in the other peerages. Those peers who are known by a higher title in one of the other peerages are listed in italics.

== History ==
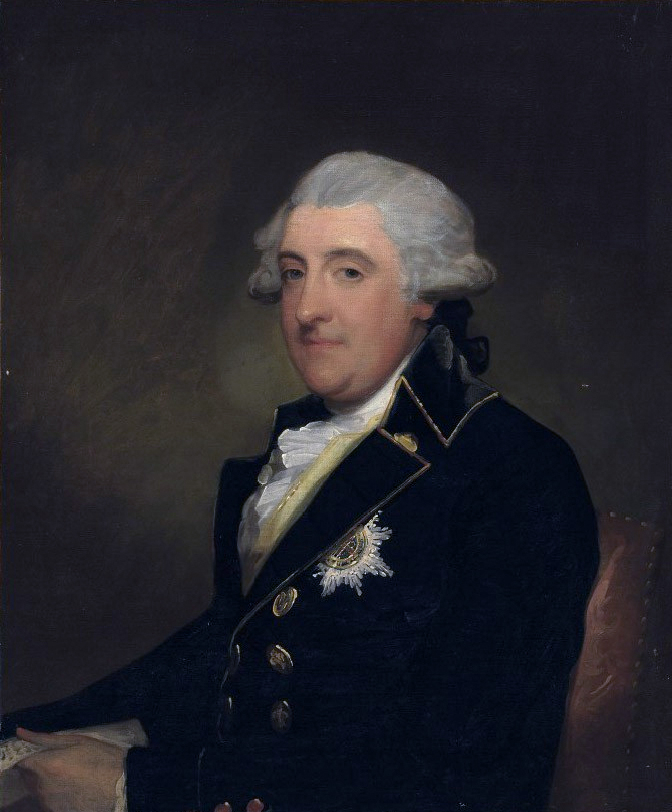
William FitzGerald, 2nd Duke of Leinster

Relatively few titles in the peerage of Ireland date from the Middle Ages. Before 1801, Irish peers had the right to sit in the Irish House of Lords, on the abolition of which by the Union effective in 1801 by an Act of 1800 they elected a small proportion – twenty-eight Irish representative peers – of their number (and elected replacements as they died) to the House of Lords at Westminster.

Both before and after the Union, Irish peerages were often used as a way of creating peerages which did not grant a seat in the House of Lords of England (before 1707) or Great Britain (after 1707) and so allowed the grantee (such as Clive of India) to sit in the House of Commons in London. As a consequence, many late-made Irish peers had little or no connection to Ireland, and indeed the names of some Irish peerages refer to places in Great Britain (for example, the Earldom of Mexborough refers to a place in England and the Earldom of Ranfurly refers to a village in Scotland). Even after the Union, Irish peers could not represent seats in Ireland in the Commons, but if not representative peers then they could be elected in Great Britain: when Castlereagh inherited the Marquisate of Londonderry in 1821, he automatically ceased being MP for Down in Ireland but was then elected in Orford in England.

Irish peerages continued to be created for almost a century after the union, although the treaty of union placed restrictions on their numbers: three needed to become extinct before a new peerage could be granted, until there were only one hundred Irish peers (exclusive of those who held any peerage of Great Britain subsisting at the time of the union, or of the United Kingdom created since the union). There was a spate of creations of Irish peerages from 1797 onward, mostly peerages of higher ranks for existing Irish peers, as part of the negotiation of the Act of Union; this ended in the first week of January 1801, but the restrictions of the Act were not applied to the last few peers. In the following decades, Irish peerages were created at least as often as the Act permitted until at least 1856. But the pace then slowed, with only four more being created in the rest of the 19th century, and none in the 20th and 21st centuries.

The last two grants of Irish peerages were the promotion of the Marquess of Abercorn (a peerage of Great Britain) to be Duke of Abercorn in the Irish Peerage when he became Lord-Lieutenant of Ireland in 1868 and the granting of the Curzon of Kedleston barony to George Curzon when he became Viceroy of India in 1898. Peers of Ireland have precedence below peers of England, Scotland, and Great Britain of the same rank, and above peers of the United Kingdom of the same rank; but Irish peers created after 1801 yield to United Kingdom peers of earlier creation. Accordingly, the Duke of Abercorn (the junior duke in the Peerage of Ireland) ranks between the Duke of Sutherland and the Duke of Westminster (both dukes in the Peerage of the United Kingdom).

When one of the Irish representative peers died, the Irish Peerage met to elect his replacement; but the offices required to arrange this were abolished as part of the creation of the Irish Free State. The existing representative peers kept their seats in the House of Lords, but they have not been replaced. Since the death of the 4th Earl of Kilmorey in 1961, none remains. The right of the Irish Peerage to elect representatives was abolished by the Statute Law (Repeals) Act 1971.

Titles in the Peerage of the United Kingdom have also referred to places in Ireland, for example Baron Arklow (created 1801 and 1881) and Baron Killarney (created 1892 and 1920). Since partition, only places in Northern Ireland have been used, although the 1880 title "Baron Mount Temple, of Mount Temple in the County of Sligo", was recreated in 1932 as "Baron Mount Temple, of Lee in the County of Southampton".

== Ranks ==
In the following table of the Peerage of Ireland as it currently stands, each peer's highest titles in each of the other peerages (if any) are also listed.

Irish peers having titles in the Peerages of England, Great Britain or the United Kingdom (or, after 1963, of Scotland) had automatic seats in the House of Lords until 1999.

The Earl of Darnley inherited the Baron Clifton (England) in 1722–1900 and 1937–1999 as the barony is in writ.

Country	Peerage	Years
England	England	1066–1707
Scotland	Scotland	c. 1140–1707
Ireland	Ireland	c. 1170–1922
Great Britain	Great Britain	1707–1801
United Kingdom	United Kingdom	1801–present

== Dukes in the Peerage of Ireland ==
Shield	Title	Creation	Other Dukedom or higher titles House of Lords titles		Monarch
Kingdom of Ireland
	The Duke of Leinster	26 November 1766	(Kingdom of Great Britain) Viscount Leinster	1747–1999	King George III
	The Duke of Leinster	26 November 1766	(United Kingdom) Baron Kildare	1870–1999	King George III
United Kingdom of Great Britain and Ireland
	The Duke of Abercorn	10 August 1868	(Kingdom of Great Britain) Marquess of Abercorn	1790–1999	Queen Victoria
	The Duke of Abercorn	10 August 1868	(Kingdom of Great Britain) Viscount Hamilton	1786–1999	Queen Victoria

== Marquesses in the Peerage of Ireland ==
- Subsidiary title.

Shield	Title	Creation	Other Marquessate or higher titles House of Lords titles		Monarch
Kingdom of Ireland
	The Marquess of Kildare	3 March 1761	Duke of Leinster (Ireland)		King George III
	The Marquess of Waterford	19 August 1789	(Kingdom of Great Britain) Baron Tyrone	1786–1999	King George III
	The Marquess of Downshire	20 August 1789	(Kingdom of Great Britain) Earl of Hillsborough	1772–1999	King George III
	The Marquess of Downshire	20 August 1789	(Kingdom of Great Britain) Baron Harwich	1756–1999	King George III
	The Marquess of Downshire	20 August 1789	(United Kingdom) Baron Sandys	Since 2013	King George III
	The Marquess of Donegall	4 July 1791	(Kingdom of Great Britain) Baron Fisherwick	1790–1999	King George III
	The Marquess of Donegall	4 July 1791	(United Kingdom) Baron Templemore	1975–1999	King George III
	The Marquess of Headfort	29 December 1800	(United Kingdom) Baron Kenlis	1831–1999	King George III
	The Marquess of Sligo	29 December 1800	(United Kingdom) Baron Monteagle	1806–1999	King George III
	The Marquess of Ely	29 December 1800	(United Kingdom) Baron Loftus	1801–1999	King George III
United Kingdom of Great Britain and Ireland
	The Marquess Conyngham	1 January 1816	(United Kingdom) Baron Minster	1821–1999	The Prince Regent on behalf of King George III
	The Marquess of Londonderry	13 January 1816	(United Kingdom) Earl Vane	1823–1999	The Prince Regent on behalf of King George III
	The Marquess of Londonderry	13 January 1816	(United Kingdom) Baron Stewart	1814–1999	The Prince Regent on behalf of King George III

== Earls in the Peerage of Ireland ==
- Subsidiary title.

Shield	Title	Creation	Other Earldom or higher titles House of Lords titles		Monarch
Kingdom of Ireland
	The Earl of Kildare	14 May 1316	Duke of Leinster (Ireland)		King Edward II
	The Earl of Waterford	17 July 1446	Earl of Shrewsbury (England)		King Henry VI
	The Earl of Cork	26 October 1620	—	—	King James I
	The Earl of Westmeath	4 September 1621	—	—	King James I
	The Earl of Desmond	22 November 1622	Held by the Earl of Denbigh (England) since 1675.		King James I
	The Earl of Meath	16 April 1627	(United Kingdom) Baron Chaworth	1831–1999	King Charles I
	The Earl of Donegall	30 March 1647	Marquess of Donegall (Ireland)		King Charles I
	The Earl of Cavan	15 April 1647	—	—	King Charles I
	The Earl of Orrery	5 September 1660	Held with Earl of Cork (Ireland) since 1753.		King Charles II
	The Earl of Orrery	5 September 1660	(Kingdom of Great Britain) Baron Boyle of Marston	1711–1999	King Charles II
	The Earl of Drogheda	14 June 1661	(United Kingdom) Baron Moore	1954–1999	King Charles II
	The Earl of Granard	30 December 1684	(United Kingdom) Baron Granard	1806–1999	King Charles II
	The Earl of Kerry	17 January 1723	Marquess of Lansdowne (Great Britain)		King George II
	The Earl of Darnley	29 June 1725	(Kingdom of England) Baron Clifton	1937–1999	King George II
	The Earl of Bessborough	6 October 1739	(Kingdom of Great Britain) Baron Ponsonby	1749–1999	King George II
	The Earl of Bessborough	6 October 1739	(United Kingdom) Baron Duncannon	1834–1999	King George II
	The Earl of Tyrone	18 July 1746	Marquess of Waterford (Ireland)		King George II
	The Earl of Carrick	10 June 1748	(United Kingdom) Baron Butler	1912–1999	King George II
	The Earl of Hillsborough	6 October 1751	Marquess of Downshire (Ireland)		King George II
	The Earl of Shelburne	6 June 1753	Marquess of Lansdowne (Great Britain)		King George II
	The Earl of Shannon	17 April 1756	(Kingdom of Great Britain) Baron Carleton	1786–1999	King George II
	The Earl of Mornington	2 October 1760	Duke of Wellington (United Kingdom)		King George II
	The Earl of Arran	12 April 1762	(United Kingdom) Baron Sudley	1884–1999	King George III
	The Earl of Courtown	12 April 1762	(Kingdom of Great Britain) Baron Saltersford	1796–1999	King George III
	The Earl of Mexborough	11 February 1766	—	—	King George III
	The Earl Winterton	12 February 1766	—	—	King George III
	The Earl of Bective	24 October 1766	Marquess of Headfort (Ireland)		King George III
	The Earl of Kingston	25 August 1768	—	—	King George III
	The Earl of Roden	1 December 1771	—	—	King George III
	The Earl of Altamont	4 December 1771	Marquess of Sligo (Ireland)		King George III
	The Earl of Clanwilliam	20 January 1776	(United Kingdom) Baron Clanwilliam	1828–1999	King George III
	The Earl of Lisburne	24 June 1776	—	—	King George III
	The Earl of Antrim	19 June 1785	—	—	King George III
	The Earl of Longford	20 June 1785	(United Kingdom) Baron Silchester	1821–1999	King George III
	The Earl of Longford	20 June 1785	(United Kingdom) Baron Pakenham	1945–1999	King George III
	The Earl of Portarlington	21 June 1785	—	—	King George III
	The Earl of Mayo	24 June 1785	—	—	King George III
	The Earl Annesley	7 August 1789	—	—	King George III
	The Earl of Enniskillen	18 August 1789	(United Kingdom) Baron Grinstead	1815–1999	King George III
	The Earl Erne	19 August 1789	(United Kingdom) Baron Fermanagh	1876–1999	King George III
	The Earl of Ely	2 March 1794	Marquess of Ely (Ireland)		King George III
	The Earl of Lucan	1 October 1795	(United Kingdom) Baron Bingham	1934–1974/1999	King George III
	The Earl of Londonderry	8 August 1796	Marquess of Londonderry (Ireland)		King George III
	The Earl Conyngham	5 November 1797	Marquess Conyngham (Ireland)		King George III
	The Earl Belmore	20 November 1797	—	—	King George III
	The Earl of Caledon	29 December 1800	—	—	King George III
	The Earl Castle Stewart	29 December 1800	—	—	King George III
	The Earl of Clanricarde	29 December 1800	Marquess of Sligo (Ireland)		King George III
	The Earl of Donoughmore	29 December 1800	(United Kingdom) Viscount Hutchinson	1821–1999	King George III
United Kingdom of Great Britain and Ireland
	The Earl of Limerick	1 January 1803	(United Kingdom) Baron Worlingham	1815–1999	King George III
	The Earl of Clancarty	11 February 1803	(United Kingdom) Viscount Clancarty	1823–1999	King George III
	The Earl of Clancarty	11 February 1803	(United Kingdom) Baron Trench	1815–1999	King George III
	The Earl of Gosford	1 February 1806	(United Kingdom) Baron Worlingham	1835–1999	King George III
	The Earl of Gosford	1 February 1806	(United Kingdom) Baron Acheson	1847–1999	King George III
	The Earl of Rosse	3 February 1806	—		King George III
	The Earl of Normanton	6 February 1806	(Kingdom of Great Britain) Baron Mendip	1974–1999	King George III
	The Earl of Normanton	6 February 1806	(United Kingdom) Baron Somerton	1873–1999	King George III
	The Earl of Kilmorey	5 February 1822	—	—	King George IV
	The Earl of Listowel	5 February 1822	(United Kingdom) Baron Hare	1869–1999	King George IV
	The Earl of Norbury	23 June 1827	—		King George IV
	The Earl of Ranfurly	14 September 1831	(United Kingdom) Baron Ranfurly	1826–1999	King William IV

== Viscounts in the Peerage of Ireland ==
- Subsidiary title.

Shield	Title	Creation	Other Viscountcy or higher titles House of Lords titles		Monarch
Kingdom of Ireland
	The Viscount Gormanston	7 August 1478	(United Kingdom) Baron Gormanston	1868–1999	King Edward IV
	The Viscount Mountgarret	23 October 1550	(United Kingdom) Baron Mountgarret	1911–1999	King Edward VI
	The Viscount Grandison	3 July 1620	Earl of Jersey (England)		King James I
	The Viscount Moore	7 February 1621	Earl of Drogheda (Ireland)		King James I
	The Viscount Valentia	11 March 1622	—	—	King James I
	The Viscount Dillon	16 March 1622	—	—	King James I
	The Viscount Callan	22 November 1622	Earl of Denbigh (England)		King James I
	The Viscount Chichester	1 April 1625	Marquess of Donegall (Ireland)		King Charles I
	The Viscount Kilmorey	18 April 1625	Earl of Kilmorey (Ireland)		King Charles I
	The Viscount Boyle of Kinalmeaky	28 February 1627	Earl of Cork (Ireland)		King Charles I
	The Viscount Lumley	12 July 1628	Earl of Scarbrough (England)		King Charles I
	The Viscount Ikerrin	12 May 1629	Earl of Carrick (Ireland)		King Charles I
	The Viscount Massereene	21 November 1660	—	—	King Charles II
	The Viscount Cholmondeley	29 March 1661	Marquess of Cholmondeley (United Kingdom)		King Charles II
	The Viscount Charlemont	8 October 1665	—	—	King Charles II
	The Viscount Granard	29 June 1675	Earl of Granard (Ireland)		King Charles II
	The Viscount Downe	19 February 1681	(United Kingdom) Baron Dawnay	1897–1999	King Charles II
	The Viscount Lisburne	29 June 1695	Earl of Lisburne (Ireland)		King William III
	The Viscount Strabane	2 September 1701	Duke of Abercorn (Ireland)		King William III
	The Viscount Molesworth	10 July 1716	—	—	King George I
	The Viscount Chetwynd	29 June 1717	—	—	King George I
	The Viscount Midleton	15 August 1717	(Kingdom of Great Britain) Baron Brodrick	1796–1999	King George I
	The Viscount Boyne	20 August 1717	(United Kingdom) Baron Brancepeth	1866–1999	King George I
	The Viscount Hillsborough	29 May 1719	Marquess of Downshire (Ireland)		King George I
	The Viscount Grimston	29 May 1719	Earl of Verulam (United Kingdom)		King George I
	The Viscount Gage	14 September 1720	(Kingdom of Great Britain) Baron Gage	1790–1999	King George I
	The Viscount Tyrone	4 November 1720	Marquess of Waterford (Ireland)		King George I
	The Viscount Clanmaurice	17 January 1722	Marquess of Lansdowne (Great Britain)		King George I
	The Viscount Duncannon	28 February 1723	Earl of Bessborough (Ireland)		King George I
	The Viscount Darnley	7 March 1723	Earl of Darnley (Ireland)		King George I
	The Viscount Galway	17 July 1727	—	—	King George II
	The Viscount Powerscourt	4 February 1743	(United Kingdom) Baron Powerscourt	1885–1999	King George II
	The Viscount Ashbrook	30 September 1751	—	—	King George II
	The Viscount Kilwarlin	3 October 1751	Marquess of Downshire (Ireland)		King George II
	The Viscount Fitzmaurice	7 October 1751	Marquess of Lansdowne (Great Britain)		King George II
	The Viscount Jocelyn	6 December 1755	Earl of Roden (Ireland)		King George II
	The Viscount Sudley	15 August 1758	Earl of Arran (Ireland)		King George II
	The Viscount Headfort	12 April 1762	Marquess of Headfort (Ireland)		King George III
	The Viscount Glerawly	14 November 1766	Earl Annesley (Ireland)		King George III
	The Viscount Kingsborough	15 November 1766	Earl of Kingston (Ireland)		King George III
	The Viscount Clanwilliam	17 November 1766	Earl of Clanwilliam (Ireland)		King George III
	The Viscount Westport	24 August 1768	Marquess of Sligo (Ireland)		King George III
	The Viscount Southwell	18 July 1776	—	—	King George III
	The Viscount de Vesci	19 July 1776	—	—	King George III
	The Viscount Enniskillen	20 July 1776	Earl of Enniskillen (Ireland)		King George III
	The Viscount Carlow	24 July 1776	Earl of Portarlington (Ireland)		King George III
	The Viscount Erne	6 January 1781	Earl Erne (Ireland)		King George III
	The Viscount Lifford	8 January 1781	—	—	King George III
	The Viscount Bangor	11 January 1781	—	—	King George III
	The Viscount Mayo	13 January 1781	Earl of Mayo (Ireland)		King George III
	The Viscount Gosford	20 June 1785	Earl of Gosford (Ireland)		King George III
	The Viscount Doneraile	22 June 1785	—	—	King George III
	The Viscount Belmore	6 December 1789	Earl Belmore (Ireland)		King George III
	The Viscount Conyngham	6 December 1789	Marquess Conyngham (Ireland)		King George III
	The Viscount Harberton	5 July 1791	—	—	King George III
	The Viscount Northland	5 July 1791	Earl of Ranfurly (Ireland)		King George III
	The Viscount Hawarden	5 December 1793	—	—	King George III
	The Viscount Castle Stuart	20 December 1793	Earl Castle Stewart (Ireland)		King George III
	The Viscount Loftus	2 March 1794	Marquess of Ely (Ireland)		King George III
	The Viscount Castlereagh	1 October 1795	Marquess of Londonderry (Ireland)		King George III
	The Viscount Mount Charles	5 November 1797	Marquess Conyngham (Ireland)		King George III
	The Viscount Ferrard	22 November 1797	Held by with Viscount Massereene (Ireland) since 1843.		King George III
	The Viscount Ferrard	22 November 1797	(United Kingdom) Baron Oriel	1821–1999	King George III
	The Viscount Caledon	23 November 1797	Earl of Caledon (Ireland)		King George III
	The Viscount Donoughmore	20 December 1797	Earl of Donoughmore (Ireland)		King George III
	The Viscount Dunlo	29 December 1800	Earls of Clancarty (Ireland)		King George III
	The Viscount Somerton	29 December 1800	Earl of Normanton (Ireland)		King George III
United Kingdom of Great Britain and Ireland
	The Viscount Monck	5 January 1801	(United Kingdom) Baron Monck	1866–1999	King George III
	The Viscount Lorton	28 May 1806	Earl of Kingston (Ireland)		King George III
	The Viscount Ennismore and Listowel	15 January 1816	Earl of Listowel (Ireland)		The Prince Regent on behalf of King George III
	The Viscount Gort	16 January 1816	—	—	The Prince Regent on behalf of King George III

== Barons in the Peerage of Ireland ==
In Ireland, barony may also refer to a semi-obsolete political subdivision of a county. There is no connection between such a barony and the noble title of baron.

- Subsidiary title.

Shield	Title	Creation	Other Barony or higher titles House of Lords titles		Monarch
Kingdom of Ireland
	The Lord Kingsale	1397	—	—	King Edward III
	The Lord Dunsany	1439	—	—	King Henry VI
	The Lord Dunboyne	1541	—	—	King Henry VIII
	The Lord Louth	1541	—	—	King Henry VIII
	The Lord Inchiquin	1543	—	—	King Henry VIII
	The Lord Digby	1620	Sat as Lord Digby (Great Britain) in the House of Lords from 1765 to 1999.	—	King James I
	The Lord Conway and Killultagh	1712	Marquess of Hertford (Great Britain); Lord Conway (England)	—	King George I
	The Lord Newborough	1715	Marquess of Cholmondeley (United Kingdom)	—	King George I
	The Lord Carbery	1715	—	—	King George I
	The Lord Aylmer	1718	—	—	King George I
	The Lord Farnham	1756	—	—	King George II
	The Lord Lisle	1758	—	—	King George II
	The Lord Clive	1762	Earl of Powis (United Kingdom); Lord Clive (Great Britain)	—	King George III
	The Lord Mulgrave	1767	Marquess of Normanby (United Kingdom)	—	King George III
	The Lord Newborough	1776	—	—	King George III
	The Lord Macdonald	1776	—	—	King George III
	The Lord Kensington	1776	Lord Kensington (United Kingdom) in the House of Lords from 1886 to 1999.	—	King George III
	The Lord Westcote	1776	Viscount Cobham (Great Britain)	—	King George III
	The Lord Massy	1776	—	—	King George III
	The Lord Muskerry	1781	—	—	King George III
	The Lord Hood	1782	Viscount Hood (Great Britain)	—	King George III
	The Lord Sheffield	1783	Sat as Lord Stanley of Alderley in Peerage of the United Kingdom in the House of Lords from 1903 to 1999; Sat as Lord Eddisbury (United Kingdom) in the House of Lords from 1903 to 1999.	—	King George III
	The Lord Kilmaine	1789	—	—	King George III
	The Lord Auckland	1789	Sat as Lord Auckland in the Peerage of Great Britain in the House of Lords from 1793 to 1999.	—	King George III
	The Lord Waterpark	1792	—	—	King George III
	The Lord Bridport	1794	Viscount Bridport (United Kingdom)	—	King George III
	The Lord Graves	1794	—	—	King George III
	The Lord Huntingfield	1796	—	—	King George III
	The Lord Carrington	1796	Sat as Lord Carrington (Great Britain) in the House of Lords from 1797 to 1999.	—	King George III
	The Lord Rossmore	1796	Sat as Lord Rossmore (United Kingdom) in the House of Lords from 1838 to 1999.		King George III
	The Baron Hotham	17 March 1797	—	—	King George III
	The Baron Crofton	1 December 1797	—	—	King George III
	The Baron ffrench	14 February 1798	—	—	King George III
	The Baron Henley	9 November 1799	(United Kingdom) Baron Northington	1885–1999	King George III
	The Baron Clanmorris	31 July 1800	—	—	King George III
	The Baron Dufferin and Claneboye	31 July 1800	—	—	King George III
	The Baron Dunalley	31 July 1800	—	—	King George III
	The Baron Ennismore	31 July 1800	Earl of Listowel (Ireland)		King George III
	The Baron Henniker	31 July 1800	(United Kingdom) Baron Hartismere	1866–1999	King George III
	The Baron Langford	31 July 1800	—	—	King George III
	The Baron Ventry	31 July 1800	—	—	King George III
	The Baron Ashtown	27 December 1800	—	—	King George III
	The Baron Norbury	27 December 1800	Earl of Norbury (Ireland)		King George III
	The Baron Erris	29 December 1800	Viscount Kingston (Ireland)		King George III
United Kingdom of Great Britain and Ireland
	The Baron Rendlesham	1 February 1806	—	—	King George III
	The Baron Kiltarton	15 May 1810	Viscount Gort (Ireland)		King George III
	The Baron Decies	21 December 1812	—	—	The Prince Regent on behalf of King George III
	The Baron Castlemaine	24 December 1812	—	—	The Prince Regent on behalf of King George III
	The Baron Garvagh	28 August 1818	—	—	The Prince Regent on behalf of King George III
	The Baron Talbot of Malahide	26 May 1831	—	—	King William IV
	The Baron Carew	13 June 1834	(United Kingdom) Baron Carew	1838–1999	King William IV
	The Baron Oranmore and Browne	4 July 1836	(United Kingdom) Baron Mereworth	1926–1999	Queen Victoria
	The Baron Bellew	10 July 1848	—	—	Queen Victoria
	The Baron Fermoy	10 September 1865	—	—	Queen Victoria
	The Baron Rathdonnell	21 December 1868	—	—	Queen Victoria

== Extinct peerages ==
Two Irish earldoms have become extinct since the passage of the House of Lords Act 1999, both in 2011:

- Earl of Egmont (1733), Viscount Perceval (1722), Baron Perceval (1715), Baron Lovel and Holland (GB 1762), Baron Arden (1770), Baron Arden (UK 1802)
- Earl of Dunraven and Mount-Earl (1822), Viscount Mount-Earl (1816), Viscount Adare (1822), Baron Adare (1800), Baron Kenry (UK 1866)

== See also ==
- List of Irish representative peers
- Irish nobility, which distinguishes three groups of Irish nobility, the other two being:
  - Gaelic nobility of Ireland
  - Hiberno-Normans
