= Patrick Barnewall (died 1622) =

Sir Patrick Barnewall or Barnwall (died 1622), was the eldest son of Sir Christopher Barnewall of Turvey House, Grace Dieu Abbey, and Fieldston. Christopher in turn was the son of the elder Sir Patrick Barnewall, who in 1534 was made Serjeant-at-law (Ireland) and Solicitor-General for Ireland, and in 1550 became Master of the Rolls in Ireland. Patrick's mother was Marion Sherle, daughter of Richard Sherle of Shallon, County Meath: after his father's death, she remarried the prominent judge Sir Lucas Dillon. She died in 1607.

== Family ==
Sir Christopher was Sheriff of County Dublin in 1560, and is described by Raphael Holinshed, his son-in-law, as 'the lanthorn (i.e. lantern) and light as well of his house' as of that part of Ireland where he dwelt; who being sufficiently furnished as well with the knowledge of the Latin tongue, as of the common laws of England, was zealously bent to the reformation of his country.' Sir Patrick Barnewall 'was the first gentleman's son of quality that was ever put out of Ireland to be brought up in learning beyond the seas'. He succeeded his father in his estates in 1575. He married firstly Mary St. Lawrence, daughter of Christopher St Lawrence, 8th Baron Howth and Elizabeth Plunkett, but the marriage was annulled in 1579 and in 1582 he remarried Mary Bagenal, daughter of Sir Nicholas Bagenal, knight mareschal of Ireland, and Eleanor Griffith, with whom he had a son and four daughters. She died in 1609. Her sister Mabel Bagenal, celebrated for her elopement with Hugh O'Neill, 2nd Earl of Tyrone in 1591, lived with them at Turvey, for a time, and it was from Turvey, with the connivance of Sir William Warren, that Mabel fled to Warren's home at Drumcondra, where her marriage to O'Neill took place. After the death of Mary's eldest brother Henry Bagenal at the Battle of the Yellow Ford in 1598, Patrick was appointed guardian of his children. Mary Barnewall and her sister Mabel are major characters in the play Making History by Brian Friel.

== Early career ==
Barnewall began to attend the Inns of Court in London, one 'of the evident tokens of loyalty' which led Elizabeth I in November 1582 to make him a new lease of certain lands without fine for sixty years. Loyal to the English Crown he undoubtedly was, but he had inherited in a great degree both the principles and the disposition of his father and was thus inclined to 'demean himself frowardly' when the true interests of Ireland were threatened by the government, or where he felt the Roman Catholic faith, of which he was a strong and open champion, to be in peril.

=== Charged and imprisoned ===
In December 1605 he was brought before the Privy Council of Ireland at Dublin on the charge of having organised the petition of the lords and gentlemen of the Pale in favour of those persons who had refused to comply with the enactment requiring attendance at a Protestant church service on Sundays. He denied having been the author of the petition, but on account of his 'obstinate and indecent manner of defending it' was regarded as having been more deeply implicated in the offence than whoever had actually written it. He was therefore retained in prison, and ultimately was sent to England, where he was committed to the Tower of London. The timing of the petition was particularly unfortunate in coming so soon after the discovery of the Gunpowder Plot, although it was not suggested that Barnewall had any involvement in the Plot itself.

== Release and later career ==
On account of illness he was, however, first 'enlarged (I.e. freed) to his own lodgings,’ and on 31 December 1606, he was sent back to Ireland upon his bond to appear before the Lord Deputy of Ireland and Privy Council within four days to make his submission. While in London he was supposed to have acted as the agent of the recusants in obtaining a relaxation of the law requiring attendance at Anglican worship, but whether this was so or not, his spirited resistance to it had made it practically a dead letter, and no attempt was ever again made in Ireland to enforce attendance at a Protestant church through a fine in the council chamber. In 1613 he strongly opposed the creation of new boroughs in Ireland 'as being designed only to pass votes', and on this account was summoned to England again to answer to the council. He died on 11 January 1622.

== Children ==
- His son Nicholas (1592–1663) became Viscount Barnewall of Kingsland.

Of his daughters:

- Eleanor married Christopher Fleming, 12th Baron Slane, and had six sons of whom the eldest Thomas renounced the title in favour of his next brother William, 14th Baron; Thomas became Roman Catholic Archbishop of Dublin.
- Sarah (died before March 1618) married as his first wife the statesman Sir Piers Crosby but had no surviving issue.
- Jane married Rory O'More, the rebellious noble and Lord of Laois and had two sons and four daughters. The title passed to the eldest son. The House of More O'Ferrall was founded by the descendants of this marriage.
- Margaret (or Mabel) married firstly Luke Netterville, second son of Nicholas Netterville, 1st Viscount Netterville, and had issue, including Colonel Francis Netterville. She married secondly as his second wife Sir Richard Bolton, Lord Chancellor of Ireland but had no issue. She was still living in 1663, when she petitioned the Crown for financial redress, on the ground of the state of near poverty to which she and her second husband had been reduced.
- Mary married Valerian Wellesley in 1602, but the marriage was annulled in 1606. Valerian remarried Anne Cusack, granddaughter of Sir Thomas Cusack, Lord Chancellor of Ireland and widow of Sir Ambrose Forth, and had issue. The Wellesley name was later adopted by the Colley family, ancestors of the Duke of Wellington.
