= Turvey House, County Dublin =

Former mansion near Donabate, Ireland

Turvey House
- Interactive map of the Turvey House area

General information
- Status: Private mansion house
- Type: House
- Architectural style: Georgian architecture
- Location: Donabate, Turvey, Donabate, County Dublin, Ireland
- Coordinates: 53.4930°N 6.1734°W
- Completed: 1500s (tower house), 1600s (main house)
- Demolished: 1987

Technical details
- Material: Nap render finish
- Floor count: 3

Turvey House was a substantially altered 17th-century house, with tower house elements, synonymous with the townland of Turvey (Irish: Tuirbhe) near Donabate in North County Dublin. Turvey is said to be a reference to the Irish mythical character Tuirbe Tragmar ("thrower of axes"), father of Gobán Saor. At various stages, the house and surrounding lands formed the family seat of the Barnewall family. The house is said to have been constructed with stone from the ruins of the nearby Grace Dieu Abbey by either Sir Christopher Barnewall or Sir Patrick Barnewall.

The house was demolished in controversial circumstances by a construction company, the Murphy Group, in 1987.

== History ==
The house was the home of the notable Barnewall family for many generations.

In 1570, James Stanihurst arranged for Sir Christopher Barnewall to hide the English Jesuit priest and martyr Edmund Campion in the house for a period of 10 weeks to keep him from the authorities and prevent his arrest. It is during this period of hiding that Campion wrote his book A Historie of Ireland.

In 1590, Mabel Bagenal was sent against her will to Turvey by her father, Sir Nicholas Bagnel, to prevent her from marrying Hugh O'Neill, Earl of Tyrone. Ultimately, Mabel escaped from the house and eloped with O'Neill, marrying him at Drumcondra Castle near Dublin, the home of Sir William Warren.

The house continued to be owned by a branch of the Barnewall family, the Trimlestones until 1927 when it was purchased by the Counihan family along with 155 acres.

The house was purchased by the Murphy Group in 1968. Dublin Corporation, under the direction of George Redmond, then assistant Dublin city and county manager, finally gave the order for its demolition in 1987.

== Structure ==
The structure incorporated an earlier tower house, likely from the 15th century, as well as much of the original 16th-century house associated with the Barnewall family. Much of the original rubble masonry was said to have been salvaged from the remains of the Grace Dieu abbey which was located a few kilometres further north of the house. Archaeological monitoring of rubble removal in 1993 revealed remains of a barrel vault over the ground floor.

The top or third floor of the house featured distinctive lunette or diocletian windows which were created after the original triplicate Dutch-style gables were removed from the front of the house to create a more fashionable flat roof when an additional floor was added to the house between 1725-50. The house contained tall narrow windows grouped in threes which at the time of demolition were two panes wide and five panes high. The house also contained an unusual baroque door surround. Alterations were made to the house including the installation of a then-fashionable Venetian window during alterations by Robert Birch in 1773.

The house was renovated and changed during the late 18th century to create a Georgian nine-bay, three-storey over raised basement property. The interior ceiling of the house contained an elaborate rococo ceiling in the library which was added during the eighteenth century. The large attic rooms in the house were said to have never been completely finished. The house also allegedly contained a secret or safe room.

== See also ==
- Newbridge Demesne
