= Francis Roe =

English-born infantry officer, planter and official in Ireland

Sir Francis Roe, alias Rooe (c. 1570-1620), was an English-born infantry officer who served in Ireland during the Nine Years' War, obtained grants of land during the Plantation of Ulster, and became a member of the Parliament of Ireland and mayor of Drogheda.

== Birth and parentage ==
Roe's birthdate is unknown, but his seniority in armed service makes it unlikely he was born later than 1570. The Heraldic Visitation of Derbyshire of 1611 records him as a son of John and Mary (née Beresford) Roe or Rooe and as a brother of Roger Rooe of Alport whose elaborate tomb in Youlgreave church evidences his family's status and prosperity in early seventeenth century England. (Note: He is erroneously stated to have been a brother of the diplomat Sir Thomas Roe in Rev. George Hill's An Historical Account of the Plantation of Ulster at the Commencement of the Seventeenth Century, 1608–1620, Belfast, 1877, p. 248, and the mistake is repeated by Earl Belmore in Parliamentary Memoirs of Fermanagh and Tyrone, 1613–1885, Alex. Thom & Co., 1887, p. 138. John Ordish Hulme's The History of Thurlaston, Leicestershire, Leicester, 1904, p. 52, takes Francis Roe's ancestry back further than the 1611 Visitation, making him fourth in descent from Roger Rooe who died at Flodden Field in 1513.) His paternal grandmother was a Vernon, and there are indications that her Roe descendants enjoyed favour with the Manners family who had inherited the Vernons' Haddon Hall estate. (Note: See Historical Manuscripts Commission, Twelfth Report, Part IV: Report of the Manuscripts of His Grace the Duke of Rutland preserved at Belvoir Castle, HMSO, 1888, Vol. I, pp. 140, 281, 386, 411, 464 and 487. Roe's sister Etheldreda was married to the Household Steward of Roger Manners, 5th Earl of Rutland.)

== Military service ==
He was evidently a seasoned officer by 1598 when, as Captain Francis Roe, he was one of the "old" captains appointed to command 950 "new" men augmenting an established force of 1,050 drawn from the Low Countries and sent to support Queen Elizabeth's governance of Ireland. This contingent was originally intended to be based around Lough Foyle but, following the defeat of the English army at the Battle of the Yellow Ford, was diverted to Leinster to strengthen control over Ireland's centre.

In the latter part of 1599, during the Earl of Essex's term as Lord Deputy of Ireland, Roe was stationed at Ardee, County Louth, commanding a company of 100 foot which, when mustered at Dundalk in August, formed part of Sir Charles Percy's regiment. Following Essex's replacement as Lord Deputy by Lord Mountjoy in 1600, Percy returned to England (and was implicated in Essex's Rebellion) and in May 1601 Roe and his men were garrisoned at Armagh under Sir Henry Danvers. In the autumn of that year Mountjoy ordered Danvers' command to Kinsale, County Cork, where Roe and his enlarged company of 150 were embodied in Sir Oliver St John's regiment, of which he was appointed lieutenant-colonel.

In support of the Irish rebels under Hugh O'Neill, a Spanish invasionary force had seized the town of Kinsale and garrisoned the fort at Rincurran, which controlled the entrance to Kinsale harbour. The English laid siege to the town and, on 31 October 1601, Roe was directed by St.John to frustrate Spanish attempts to relieve the Rincurran garrison. Roe, with a hundred men, became heavily engaged in skirmishes with a force twice his number and St.John, seeing that Spanish pikemen were preparing to charge, personally led thirty musketmen to reinforce Roe, and the Spanish were driven into retreat. (Note: St John (who became Lord Deputy in 1613) was wounded in this engagement and had "great honour given him by the whole army for that which he did in their sight with his own hand": Fynes Moryson, A History of Ireland, 1599 to 1603, George Ewing, Dublon, 1735, Vol. I, p. 30.) Roe was again involved in fierce fighting on 2 December.

Having marched south from their stronghold in Ulster, Hugh O'Neill's rebel force sought to encircle Kinsale's English besiegers. On 23 December the Irish and their Spanish allies unsuccessfully attacked the English trenches and, on Christmas Eve, Lord Mountjoy prepared his army to confront the combined enemy. On Christmas morning the Irish were drawn up in three divisions of which the vanguard was commanded by Richard Tyrrell and, when an English cavalry charge routed the main division under O'Neill, Tyrrell attempted to rescue it. Mountjoy immediately ordered Roe to attack Tyrrell's flank with St John's regiment of 515 men and the vanguard "retired disorderly" under this attack. The Irish army then disintegrated while the Spanish withdrew into Kinsale town. 1,200 Irish soldiers were left dead on the field, the remnants of O'Neill's army fled, and soon afterwards the Spanish negotiated their surrender and repatriation.

In April 1602 Roe and his company of 150 were "in the field for summer service" as part of the expedition that Mountjoy led north to eliminate O'Neill's forces in County Tyrone. In furtherance of Mountjoy's strategy of creating fortified strongholds within O'Neill's home territory, a fort was constructed overlooking Lough Neagh near Dungannon. The fort, capable of holding a garrison of 1,100, (Note: According to Rev. E. A. D'Alton, the garrison at Mountjoy was 1,900-strong in 1602: History of Ireland from the Earliest Times to the Present Day, Gresham Publishing Company, London, 1920, Vol. III, p. 190.) was named Mountjoy Castle and in June 1602 placed under the command of Francis Roe who was subsequently appointed its Governor. (Note: The Dutchman Joyes Everard is credited with having "commenced building Mountjoy Fort in County Tyrone c1604": James Stevens Curl, The Londonderry Plantation, 1609–1914, Phillimore & Co. Ltd., Chichester, 1986, p. 320. In 1611 Carew's Report stated the castle occupied by Francis Roe at Mountjoy stood "beside the old fort": Calendar of the Carew Manuscripts preserved in the Archiepiscopal Library at Lambeth, ed. J. S. Brewer and William Bullen, Longmans, London, 1873, p. 224.)

== Knighthood and maintenance of the peace ==
In April 1603 the Treaty of Mellifont brought the Nine Years' War to an end and Mountjoy was succeeded as Lord Deputy by Sir George Carew. On 29 September Carew knighted Francis Roe at Dublin Castle, immediately after conferring knighthood on Rory O'Donnell, the newly created Earl of Tyrconnell and brother of Red Hugh O'Donnell (O'Neill's principal associate during the war, fatally poisoned in Spain in 1602).

In September 1607 occurred the Flight of the Earls (Hugh O'Neill and Rory O'Donnell) and in response Sir Arthur Chichester, now the Irish Lord Deputy, promptly appointed seventeen commissioners to administer justice and maintain peace throughout the counties of Tyrone, Tyrconnell (i.e. Donegal) and Armagh. Sir Francis Roe was one of those appointed and in January 1608 he and another commissioner, Sir Toby Caulfeild, were given governance of the upper part of County Tyrone and of all County Armagh.

Others among these commissioners were Sir Cahir O'Doherty and Sir George Paulet. In April 1608 the former, under provocation from the latter, turned rebel, burned the town of Derry, and was killed. Following the Treaty of Mellifont, Roe's garrison at Mountjoy had been reduced from 150 to 50 in number, but in July 1608 an additional 50 men were added to his strength and in October he was allowed £90 for repairs and improvements of "His Majesty's fort at Mountjoy".

The Flight of the Earls and O'Doherty's rebellion accelerated plans for the Plantation of Ulster under which lands in the province were to be awarded to three classes of grantee, one being known as "servitors". (Note: The "servitors" of the Plantation period were "military men who had fought for the crown during Tyrone's rebellion and established claims on the royal generosity which they expected to have satisfied during the peace": T. W. Moody, "Sir Thomas Phillips of Limavady, Servitor" in Irish Historical Studies, Vol. I, No. 3 (March 1939), Cambridge University Press, p. 251.) Preferred among the latter were military veterans who already had a domestic base in the areas to be "planted", and Chichester urged the case for allocating lands to Sir Francis Roe, "a gentleman of ability [who] can give good furtherance to the Plantation if encouraged to undertake upon reasonable conditions" settlement of the "fast country" adjoining the fort at Mountjoy.

In preparation for such allocation, on 19 June 1610 letters patent were issued by James I granting Roe "the castle, or fort, and town of Mountjoy with 300 acres of land thereunto belonging" for a term of 21 years. The grant was followed on 28 February 1611 by allocation to Roe in perpetuity of 1,000 acres (Note: The 1,000 acres is Plantation measure, said to have been equivalent to over 3,500 acres in 1887: Belmore, Parliamentary Memoirs, p. 140.) in the parish of Desertcreat which were "created into the manor of Roe with a court baron". In the same year Roe and his family were living at Mountjoy in a "fair castle of stone and brick covered with slate and tile" standing within a bawn 80 feet long and 60 feet broad "with a quick-set [hedge] upon it and a good deep ditch about it". Nearby were seventeen houses occupied by British tenants.

== Member of Parliament and mayor ==
In 1612 authority was granted for this settlement to be incorporated as a borough governed by a Provost and Burgesses entitled to elect a Member of the Irish Parliament. (Note: The list of the first Provost and Burgesses of the proposed borough begins with the name of Nicholas Roe, probably Nicholas who is named as a brother of Sir Francis Roe in the Visitation pedigree of 1611 and in the latter's land settlement of 1616.) Such authority was not implemented, but on 23 April 1613 Roe was returned to the Dublin Parliament as a Knight of the Shire for County Tyrone.

In 1615 he and his wife jointly purchased additional holdings in Desertcreat and were granted a lease of ecclesiastical lands there by the Archbishop of Armagh. These were excluded from a 1616 settlement whereby the couple vested their Desertcreat property in Sir Garret Moore of Mellifont, Sir Roger Jones and Sir Nicholas White (Note: Garret Moore (to whom Roger Jones and Nicholas White were sons-in-law) had been a brother in arms of Roe from the time when they were both based at Ardee in 1599; he played a principal part in the peace negotiations of 1603, conducted at his seat of Mellifont Abbey after which the Treaty ending the Nine Years' War is named.) to hold the same on trust for the Roes during their lives and thereafter, subject to payment of capital sums to Sir Francis's siblings, for the benefit of Moore's son Thomas. (Note: This Thomas Moore (knighted by Sir Oliver St John) died, aged 30, in December 1623, soon after his marriage to a daughter of the Earl of Cork. His interest in the manor of Roe is said to have passed to his niece Letitia: Belmore, p.143.)

It was presumably soon after 1616 that Roe removed to Drogheda, where he was in office as the town's mayor in 1620. As Drogheda's mayor he possessed extensive jurisdiction (Note: Little had changed in this regard by the nineteenth century when Drogheda's mayor was automatically a "justice of the peace for the county, judge of the Tholsel Court, the Courts of Conscience and Pie Poudre and hitherto acted as escheator and clerk of the market": John D'Alton, The History of Drogheda, Dublin, 1844, p. 140.) and it may have been in response to its exercise in 1620 that Christopher Draycott (Note: In 1638 the arrest of Christopher Draycott of Mornington, son and heir of Sir John Draycott and grandson of Henry Draycott, was the subject of correspondence by the Mayor of Drogheda to Lord Deputy Wentworth: Papers of Sir Thomas Wentworth, 1st Earl of Strafford, 1583–1641 (Sheffield City Libraries: WWM/StrP/24-25/417, 418).) "behaved outrageously" towards him by spitting in his face, striking Lady Roe, assaulting the town's gaoler and "uttering vile language" and was, in consequence, summoned before the Court of Castle Chamber.

== Death and widow ==
He died on 26 June 1620, during his mayoralty, and was "very honourably" buried in St Peter's church at Drogheda on 13 July. The interval between death and burial may indicate that work was promptly undertaken to construct his tomb, on which a figure of him is shown wearing his scarlet robe of office.

His wife, Margery, was an illegitimate daughter of Sir Nicholas Bagenal, sometime Marshal of the Army in Ireland, and therefore a half-sister of Mabel Bagenal who was briefly (1591–96) married to the rebel leader Hugh O'Neill.

Roe left no children and by 22 August 1622, when she proved his will, his widow had married George Downham, Bishop of Derry. In 1631 she transferred to one of her Downham stepsons the Desertcreat property that she and Roe had jointly purchased, and at her death in 1656 she left her leasehold estate to another of these stepsons, James Downhame. (Note: The lease of Church lands in Desertcreat had been renewed to her for a term of sixty years from July 1634: Belmore, p. 143.) In 1634 her second husband's successor at Derry, Bishop John Bramhall, assured Archbishop William Laud that she prayed for him daily ("My Lady Roe is your Grace's daily beadswoman").
