= Henry Heron (soldier) =

Irish soldier

Henry Heron was an Irish soldier of the Tudor era. He was the son of Sir Nicholas Heron, an Englishman who had settled in Ireland and become a leading political and military figure. Henry became a brother-in-law to Sir Henry Bagenal and Dudley Bagenal, sons of another leading settler in Ireland Sir Nicholas Bagenal.

Henry was a landowner in County Carlow, where he became drawn into a violent dispute with the neighboring Kavanaghs. In 1586 along with his brother-in-law Dudley, he took part in an operation that captured and killed a leading Kavanagh. The following year Dudley was killed in a revenge ambush. By 1588 Heron had to petition the Crown for financial relief due to the attacks on his estates.

== Bibliography ==
- Mahoney, Edward (ed.). Philosophy and Humanism: Reinaissance Essays in Honor of Paul Oskar Kristeller. Brill Archive, 1976.
