= Walter Bagenal =

Walter Bagenal may refer to:

- Lord Walter Bagenal (1670–1745), founded the town of Bagenalstown on the River Barrow
- Walter Bagenal (1762–1814) Irish politician, MP for Carlow 1802–16
