= Adam Loftus =

Adam Loftus may refer to:

- Adam Loftus (bishop) (c. 1533–1605), Church of Ireland Archbishop of Armagh and later Archbishop of Dublin
- Adam Loftus, 1st Viscount Loftus (c. 1568–1643), nephew of the Archbishop, Irish peer
- Adam Loftus (politician), grandson of the Archbishop
- Adam Loftus, 1st Viscount Lisburne (1647–1691), Anglo-Irish peer and military commander
