= Nicholas Loftus =

Irish politician and public official

Nicholas Loftus (1592-1666) was an Irish politician and public official.

He was the son of Sir Dudley Loftus and the grandson of Adam Loftus, the Archbishop of Dublin and an influential political figure in Tudor Ireland. His mother Anne Bagenal was from a leading Ulster family headed by Sir Nicholas Bagenal. She later remarried to the prominent judge Lord Sarsfield, who thus became Nicholas' stepfather.

Nicholas' elder brother Sir Adam Loftus was made Vice-Treasurer of Ireland during the administration of Thomas Wentworth while Nicholas was appointed as an Irish Treasury official, with the title Clerk of the Pells, under him. He was elected as a member of the Parliament of Ireland in 1613 and 1634, representing the seat of Fethard in County Wexford. In the 1640 Parliament he sat for County Wexford seat. In the Parliament elected in 1661, he sat once again for Fethard.

In 1623, he married Margaret Chetham, the daughter of Thomas Chetham, a prosperous landowner from Nuthurst (now New Moston), Lancashire, who later acquired an estate at Hacketstown, County Wicklow, and his first wife Mary Forster. By his wife he had fourteen children, of whom six sons and five daughters reached adult life. After his death in 1666, he was succeeded by his eldest son Sir Nicholas Loftus. The second son Henry was the father of Nicholas Loftus, 1st Viscount Loftus, who inherited his uncle's estates after the failure of his male line.

== Bibliography ==
- Kearney, Hugh F. Strafford in Ireland 1633-1641: A Study in Absolutism. Cambridge University Press, 1989.
