= Henry Heron =

Henry Heron may refer to:

- Henry Heron (soldier), of Elizabethan Ireland
- Henry Heron (MP) (1675–1730), member of parliament for Boston and Lincolnshire
- Henry Heron of the Heron baronets

== See also ==
- Heron (disambiguation)
