= Dudley Bagenal =

Irish landowner and soldier (1554-1587)

Dudley Bagenal (1554–1587) was an Irish soldier and landowner of the Tudor era.

Dudley was the son of the Staffordshire-born Sir Nicholas Bagenal who had settled in Ireland in the 1550s, creating a power base around Newry in Ulster thanks to the support of the dominant Gaelic lord Conn O'Neill, 1st Earl of Tyrone. Dudley was the brother of Sir Henry Bagenal, Mabel Bagenal and Anne Bagenal. He was the brother-in-law of the soldier Henry Heron.

Dudley established himself as a landowner at Dunleckney Manor in County Carlow. He served as an officer in the Irish Army force sent north to Ulster to maintain order in the 1580s, being stationed in Clandeboye. He became involved in disputes with other officers, who were resentful of his father's influence. In one incident he struck a fellow officer Sir William Stanley during an argument.

He was ambushed and killed in March 1587 in County Carlow, Leinster by a group of the Kavanagh clan. This appeared to be a revenge attack for the killing of a leader of the Kavanaghs four months earlier, which both Bagenal and his brother-in-law Henry Heron had taken part in. It was quite common for settlers of the era to become involved in Gaelic-style feuds. His death led to a political dispute between Sir Nicholas Bagenal and the Lord Deputy John Perrot who refused to grant Sir Nicholas custody of his grandson, Dudley's son George Bagenal, who was made a ward of court.

His family remained influential in Carlow, and were related to other powerful Bagenals in other parts of the country many of whom became Roman Catholics despite the Penal laws. Amongst Dudley's descendants were Dudley Bagenal and his son, Walter Bagenal, the founder of Bagenalstown.

== Bibliography ==
- Mahoney, Edward (ed.). Philosophy and Humanism: Reinaissance Essays in Honor of Paul Oskar Kristeller. Brill Archive, 1976.
- Morgan, Hiram. Tyrone's Rebellion. Boydell Press, 1999.
