= Peter Lombard (archbishop of Armagh) =

Styles of Peter Lombard
- Reference style: The Most Reverend
- Spoken style: Your Grace or Archbishop

Peter Lombard (Waterford, Ireland, c. 1555 – Rome, 1625) was a prelate of the Catholic Church in Ireland. He was Archbishop of Armagh and Primate of All Ireland during the Counter Reformation.

== Early life ==
Lombard belonged to a respectable and wealthy Old English family. More than one of his relatives filled the position of mayor of Waterford, two were High Court judges and others gained eminence in literature, among the latter being the famous Franciscan, Luke Wadding. After receiving his early education at Waterford, young Lombard was sent to Westminster School, whence, after some years, he went to Oxford. At Westminster School, one of his professors was the historian William Camden, and pupil and master seem to have got on well.

Camden's learning was great and Lombard was studious and clever and earned the praises of his master for his gentleness and docility. Camden also took credit for having made his pupil a good Anglican. But the change, if it occurred at all, did not last, and Lombard, after leaving Oxford, went to Louvain, passed through his philosophical and theological classes with great distinction, graduated as Doctor of Divinity, and was ordained priest. Appointed professor of theology at Leuven University he soon attracted notice by the extent of his learning.

== Archbishop of Armagh ==
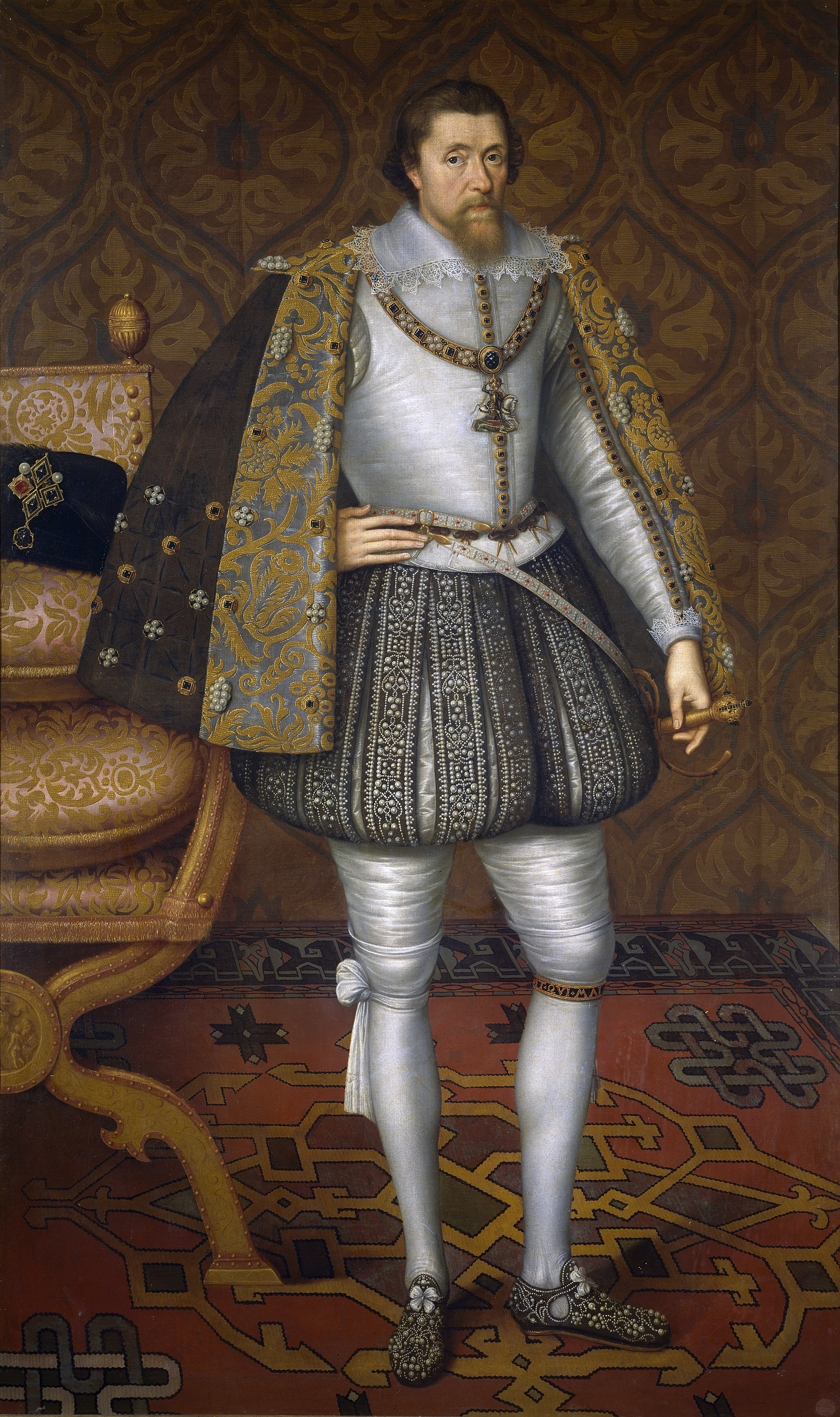
England's King James I personally disliked Lombard.

In 1594, he was made provost of the cathedral at Cambrai. When he went to Rome, a few years later, Clement VIII thought so highly of his learning and piety that he appointed him, in 1601, Archbishop of Armagh. He also appointed him his domestic prelate, and thus secured him an income, which in the condition of Ireland at the time, there was no hope of getting from Armagh. Henceforth till his death, Lombard lived in Rome.

He was for a time president of the Congregatio de Auxiliis, charged with the duty of settling the controversy raised by Luis de Molina's theses on efficacious grace, predestination and free will. Lombard was active and zealous in providing for the wants of the exiled Earl of Tyrone and Earl of Tyrconnel, and was among those who publicly welcomed them to Rome.

He was not however able to go to Ireland, for the penal laws were in force, and to set foot in Ireland would be to invite the fate of Conor O'Devanny and others. James I of England personally disliked him, and publicly attacked him in the English Parliament. Armagh was thus left without a Roman Catholic archbishop for nearly a quarter of a century.

There was however an administrator, David Rothe. He had for a time acted at Borne as Lombard's secretary and the primate appointed him Vicar-General of Armagh. Nor did Rothe cease to act in this capacity even after 1618, when he was made Bishop of Ossory.

Roman Catholics in the North complained of being left so long without an archbishop. In any case, they disliked being ruled by a Munsterman, yet more so than being ruled by one unwilling to face the dangers of his position. In Rome Lombard wrote De Regno Hiberniae sanctorum insula commentarius. This work gave such offence to Charles I of England that he gave special directions to his Irish viceroy, Strafford, to have it suppressed.

In 1622 Peter Lombard was asked by Pope Gregory XV to be a part of a Pontifical Commission into the affairs of Roberto De Nobili and his missionary activities incorporating local customary traditions in India. The commission included Cardinal Bellarmine and other notable theologians of the 17th century. Lombard, as President of the commission, was pivotal in the exoneration of De Nobili and subsequently, the Church took a whole new view on the inculturation of Christianity and its missions to the unchurched.

Lombard also wrote a little work on the administration of the Sacrament of Penance, and in 1604 a yet unedited work, addressed to James I, in favour of religious liberty for the Irish.

Towards the end of his life Lombard petitioned to become apostolic administrator of Waterford and Lismore.

== In literature ==
Lombard plays a major part in the play Making History by Brian Friel, where he is shown as both a political adviser to the Earl of Tyrone and his official historian. The title of the play refers to the view which Lombard expresses that historians are entitled to "make" history: that is they may record what they wanted to happen, rather than what actually did happen. In particular, Tyrone's third marriage to Mabel Bagenal, which is the main theme of the play, will if Lombard succeeds in rewriting history be largely excised from the life of O'Neill, as her English nationality and her family's traditional enmity to Tyrone do not sit well with the heroic image of Tyrone which Lombard is seeking to create. In its original production, Lombard was played by Irish actor Niall Tóibín.
