= Mabel Bagenal =

Anglo-Irish noblewoman (c. 1571 – 1595)

- Countess of Tyrone
- Born: c. 1571; Newry, Ireland
- Died: December 1595 (aged 24); Newry, Ireland
- Spouse: Hugh O'Neill, Earl of Tyrone (m. 1591)
- Parents: Sir Nicholas Bagenal; Eleanor Griffith

Mabel O'Neill, Countess of Tyrone (née Bagenal; c. 1571 – December 1595) was an Anglo-Irish woman, best known as the third wife of the prominent Gaelic Irish lord Hugh O'Neill, Earl of Tyrone.

Mabel was born in Newry to British parents. Her father, Marshal Nicholas Bagenal, died in February 1591 and her older brother Henry was charged with her safekeeping. In August, against Henry's will, Mabel eloped with Tyrone, a Gaelic lord twice her age who was a political opponent to Nicholas and Henry. The marriage caused a major scandal and intensified Henry and Tyrone's rivalry. Mabel ultimately became disillusioned with her marriage and eventually died of illness, aged 24.

As her brother and her husband commanded opposing forces during the Nine Years' War, Mabel has been called the "Helen of the Elizabethan Wars".

== Family background ==
Mabel Bagenal was born around 1571 in Newry, Ireland. She was the eleventh and youngest child of Sir Nicholas Bagenal, a prominent Staffordshire soldier and Marshal of the Irish Army, and his wife Eleanor Griffith of Penrhyn, Wales. Her older siblings included Henry, Dudley and Anne.

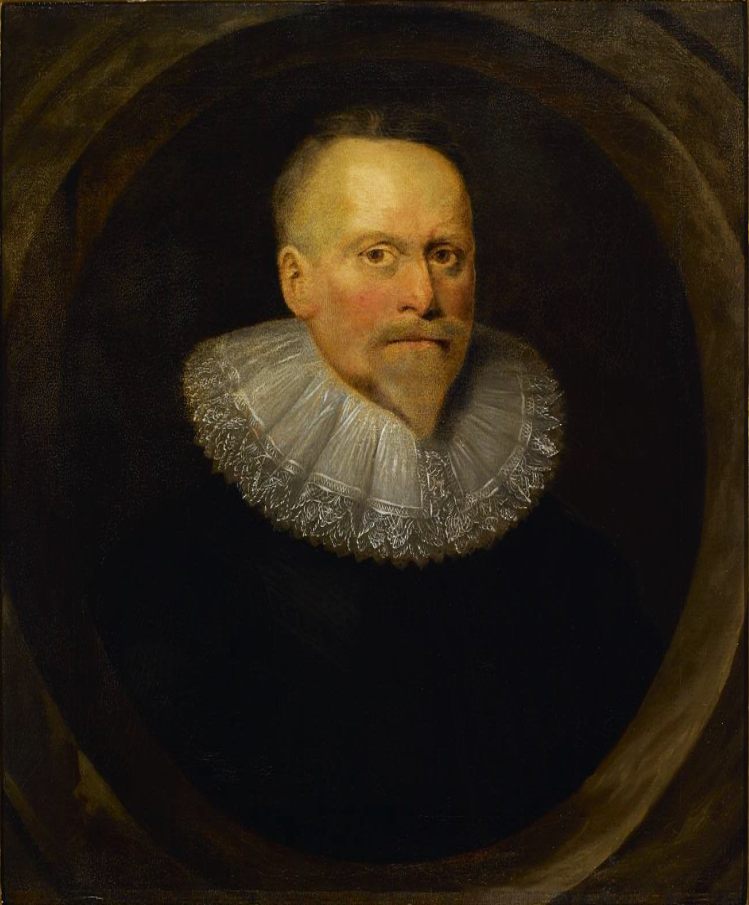
Mabel's father, Nicholas Bagenal

== Courtship and marriage ==
On 24 October 1590, Mabel's eldest brother Henry succeeded their father as Marshal. Before Nicholas's death in February 1591, he charged Henry with the "careful disposing" of Mabel and forbid her from marrying a Gaelic Irishman. Turlough Luineach O'Neill had previously expressed interest in marrying her, offering 20 English servants and six gentlewomen to attend to her. Nicholas had rebuffed this offer, stating that he would "rather see [Mabel] burned".

The prominent Gaelic lord Hugh O'Neill, Earl of Tyrone, had opposed Nicholas's marshalcy. Tyrone first became acquainted with Mabel during his visits to Newry. (Note: The historian Philip Bagenal suggests that Tyrone "must have been acquainted [with Mabel] from childhood".) Tyrone had ambitions to rule over Ulster, and was greatly offended when, in 1590, the lands of his late urrí (Note: Equivalent to a guarantor or vassal under brehon law) Hugh Roe MacMahon were divided and granted to Henry rather than himself. Tyrone's second wife Siobhán died in January 1591, and he was further frustrated when Henry was named chief commissioner of Ulster on 18 May.

Shortly afterwards, Tyrone made overtures to Henry for Mabel's hand in marriage. Mabel was twenty years old at the time; Tyrone was forty-one. Henry was alarmed and kept Mabel out of Tyrone's reach by sending her to live with their sister Mary (wife of Patrick Barnewall) in Turvey, County Dublin. Henry referred the decision to the queen and privy council, claiming that his sister was not prepared to live in what he termed an uncivil Gaelic household. A number of prominent officials, including Archbishop Loftus and Sir Geoffrey Fenton, believed that an alliance between Tyrone and the Bagenal family would be in the public interest. Tyrone wrote to the Privy Council: "I dealt with [Henry] at least six several times for his consent; I offered to put in sureties for the assurance of a jointure to his sister; this I did before good witnesses".

Tyrone found excuses to visit Mabel at Turvey. The young, attractive Mabel was infatuated by the attention she received from such an imposing lord. The historian Jerrold Casway states that this "whirlwind courtship" is unlike Tyrone's other marriages, which otherwise all had political motives. It is possible Tyrone's judgment was impaired by his feelings, though most historians believe that he recognised the advantages of marrying into the powerful Bagenal family. The marriage was his attempt to merge the Bagenals' interests with his own and to neutralise Henry's growing power. In July, Tyrone convinced Mabel to elope. According to Tyrone, "about 20 days before my marriage [c. 14 July] I got good opportunities to speak with her myself; I lodged one night at Sir Patrick Barnewell's house, where the gentlewoman was kept, where I dealt so effectually with the gentlewoman that we were trouthed together, and she received from me a chain of gold. After this there passed between her and me some messengers which confirmed our love on both sides".

After a dinner at Turvey, Tyrone and his English friends distracted Barnewall while his ally William Warren escorted Mabel on horseback to Warren's house in Drumcondra. Tyrone wanted a Protestant ceremony so that the marriage would be recognised by English law, and so Protestant Bishop of Meath Thomas Jones was summoned. Jones was reluctant to perform the marriage. He spoke with Mabel in private and asked her if she had actually "plighted her troth" to Tyrone. Mabel responded affirmatively and stated that she consented to the marriage: "in what case I am, how I come hither with my own consent, and have already promised my Lord the Earl to be his wife, I beseech your Lordship for my credit's sake to perfect the marriage between us, the sooner the better for my credit's sake". After being assured of Mabel's free consent, and for the sake of her reputation, Jones married the couple on 3 August 1591 at Drumcondra Castle.

== Married life ==
Mabel's brother Henry was outraged at the marriage. He was infuriated "that my blood which in my father and myself hath often been spilled in repressing this rebellious race, should now be mingled with so traitorous a stock and kindred". He withheld Mabel's £1000 dowry, even two years after the marriage, on the grounds that satisfactory jointure arrangements had not been made. This became a principal grievance of Tyrone's. Henry also had Tyrone's 1574 divorce investigated; it was found to be valid.

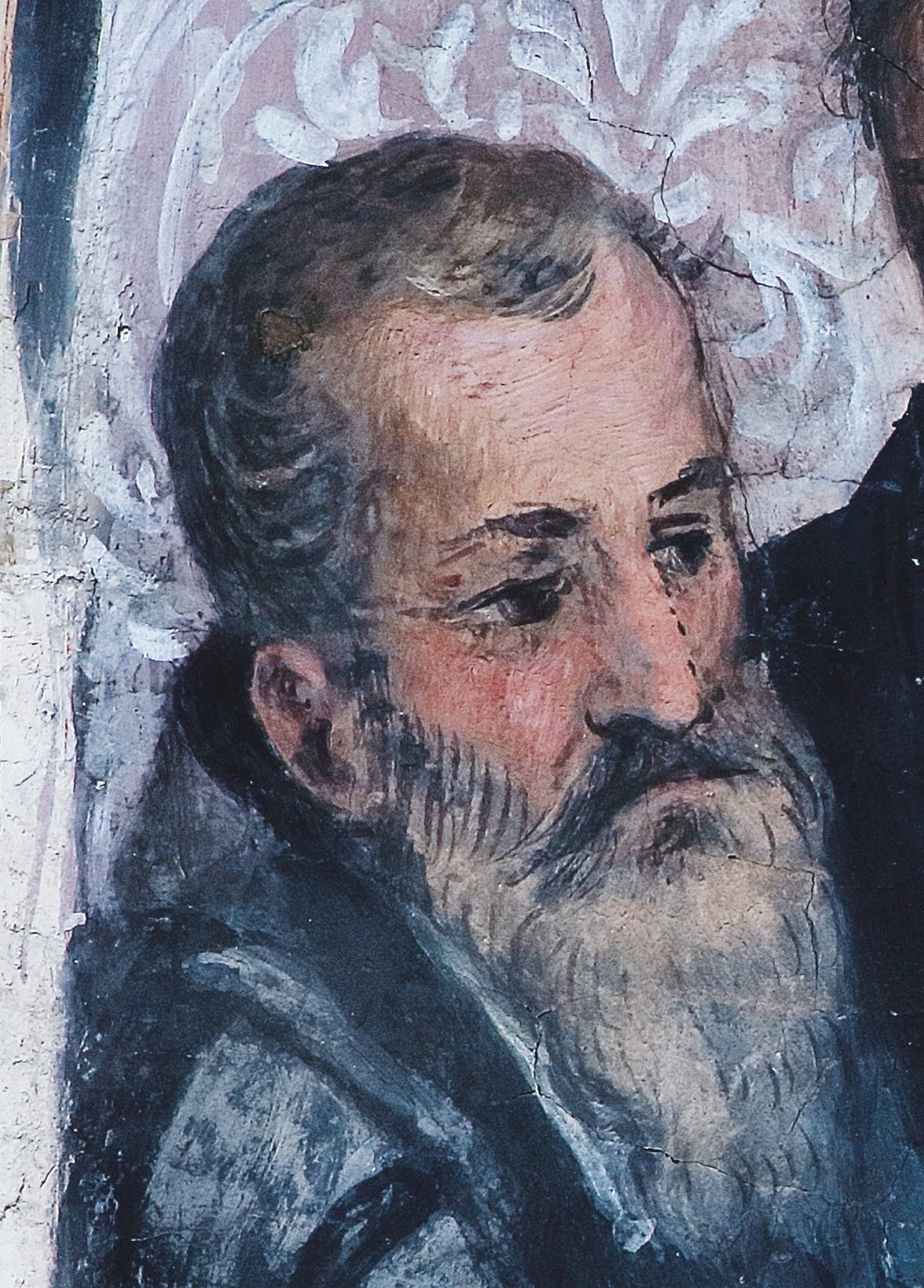
Mabel's husband, Hugh O'Neill, Earl of Tyrone

Tyrone assured Lord Burghley that it was his intention for Mabel to bring civility to his house. He encouraged Mabel to furnish his castle at Dungannon, intending that she would bring a sense of culture and refinement to the house. She bought tapestries and paintings in London, bringing an Elizabethan aesthetic to the castle. One of her handmaidens was Englishwoman Anne Wilmar.

Mabel converted to Catholicism (against her brother's wishes), which, along with Tyrone's alleged infidelity, stoked Henry's enmity further. Mabel was deeply upset by her brother's disapproval and by the increasing rivalry between her husband and brother. At Dundalk in 1593, in the presence of Mabel and his cousin Henry MacShane O'Neill, Tyrone openly insulted Mabel's brother. He stated "that there was not a man in the world he hated so much as the Knight Marshal; and further said [that] if he were disposed he would be within a mile of the said Marshal in spite of his teeth, do what he could".

From May 1593, Tyrone secretly supported rebellions again the Crown's advances into Ulster. That same month, the couple reached a major crisis when they clashed over the assassination of Henry's client Phelim MacTurlough O'Neill, which Tyrone had orchestrated. When Mabel and her husband were informed of Phelim's death, "the countess clapping her hands together was sorry, as should seem, of that which happened." Tyrone vehemently reprimanded her in English, a language that most of the witnesses present did not speak. Afterwards he did not allow Mabel to appear in public, effectively imprisoning her in Dungannon.

Casway believes that despite the romantic circumstances of their courtship, the marriage "probably ran its course" and Tyrone would have continued with his concubines. Mabel appears to have soon repented her marriage. According to Tyrone himself, "because I did affect two other gentlewomen, [Mabel] grew in dislike with me, forsook me, and went unto her brother to complain upon me to the council of Ireland, and did exhibit articles against me".

The Nine Years' War began in 1593, as a confederacy of Irish lords (secretly led by Tyrone) rebelled against British rule. Throughout 1593 and 1594, Henry Bagenal repeatedly accused Tyrone of treason and sought the Earl's arrest. Tyrone made a show of his loyalty to the Crown by assisting Henry at the Battle of Belleek. In 1594, Mabel and her husband were described as papists who supported seminary priests. Tyrone eventually went into open rebellion in February 1595 with an assault on the Blackwater Fort, and Mabel's husband and brother first openly fought each other at the Battle of Clontibret in May 1595. Tyrone succeeded Turlough Luineach as O'Neill clan chief in September 1595. This made Mabel briefly queen consort of Tír Eoghain under brehon law.

== Death ==
Mabel fell ill and ultimately died in December 1595, aged 24. The location of her death is disputed. The historians Casway and James O'Neill state that Mabel was seeking refuge with Henry in Newry when she died. Alternatively, she might have died whilst in Tyrone's captivity at Dungannon. Mabel had no children.

At the time of Mabel's death, Tyrone was feigning reconciliation with English authorities whilst secretly holding out for the 2nd Spanish Armada's arrival. Tyrone visited Dublin on 30 December and certified Mabel's death. He married his fourth and final wife, Catherine Magennis, circa August 1597. Tyrone's forces killed Henry at the Battle of the Yellow Ford on 14 August 1598.

== Legacy ==
In reference to the dramatic circumstances of her marriage, Mabel has been called the "Helen of the Elizabethan Wars". The historian Kate Newmann considers this to be a simplistic assessment of Mabel's role in the Nine Years' War.

Clare Holman as Mabel and Stephen Rea as Tyrone in Making History.

The Great O'Neill (1942), a notable biography of Tyrone by Seán Ó Faoláin, has been criticised for its overdramatisation, particularly for overtly romanticising Mabel's marriage. On Mabel, Ó Faoláin stated "this poor child had brought neither any great experience nor any great intelligence from that close-fisted, prudish, petit-bourgeois house" and that "only a woman of tremendous character and intelligence could have made a success of that marriage, so full of incongruity in race and rank". Anthony Roche criticised Ó Faoláin's depiction of Mabel as a frightened child, stating that Ó Faoláin undercuts "the independence and courage of the character it took to leave not only her family but the Protestant ethos".

The Great O'Neill was used by Brian Friel as the basis for his 1988 play Making History, where Mabel's marriage to Tyrone is a central topic. Friel depicts the marriage as a genuine, if ill-fated, love affair. She seldom appears in Making History, though her impact on Tyrone's life and legacy is significantly explored. Maria Gaviña Costero notes that Friel shifts Mabel from "a historically marginal position to the decisive figure she is in this play", and portrays her with greater agency and depth than Ó Faoláin. Though Mabel died in 1595, in Making History she is anachronistically alive and still married to Tyrone in the 1600s. She also dies during a miscarriage, whereas the historical Mabel died of illness and left no known children. In its original production by Field Day, Mabel was portrayed by English actress Clare Holman.

In 2011, an archaeological dig at Dungannon's Castle Hill uncovered the skeletal remains of a high-ranking woman. It was suggested that the remains could have been those of Mabel, though experts determined that the high-ranking woman was in her late forties or fifties when she died.
