= Fallen Angel (British TV series) =

- Genre: Crime drama
- Created by: Peter Ransley; Andrew Taylor
- Starring: Charles Dance; Emilia Fox; Clare Holman; Barbara Wilshere; Peter Capaldi; Sheila Hancock; Richard Manlove
- Country of origin: United Kingdom
- Original language: English
- No. of series: 1
- No. of episodes: 3 (list of episodes)

Production
- Executive producer: Eileen Quinn
- Producer: Dave Edwards
- Running time: 60 mins (w/advertisements)

Original release
- Network: ITV
- Release: 11 March – 13 March 2007

Fallen Angel is an ITV crime drama series, first broadcast on 11 March 2007, which is based on the Roth Trilogy of novels by Andrew Taylor. It tells the story of Rosie Byfield, a clergyman's daughter, who grows up to be a psychopathic killer. It has an unusual narrative that moves backwards in time as it uncovers the layers of Rosie's past. Starring Charles Dance and Emilia Fox, the series was subtitled The Making of a Murderer for the DVD release, which followed on 19 March.

== Plot ==
Set in 2007 London, the first episode begins with the ordination of a female curate, Mary Appleton, who is the first female curate in the fictitious diocese of Roslington. Moving backwards from episode one, the second episode starts in 1987 with Rosie, aged 16, applying for university in Roth (Little Missenden). Going back even further, episode three focuses on Rosie's childhood when her father was a dean at Roslington Cathedral in 1973 (St Albans).

== Cast ==
- Charles Dance as David Byfield
- Clare Holman as Wendy Ellis
- Barbara Wilshere as Audrey Oliphant
- Richard Manlove as Francis Youlgreave
- Emilia Fox as Rosemary "Rosie" Byfield
- Peter Capaldi as Henry Appleton
- Sheila Hancock as Lady Youlgrave
- Niamh Cusack as Vanessa Byfield

== Episode list ==
| No. | Title | Directed by | Written by | Original release date | UK viewers (millions) |
|---|---|---|---|---|---|
| 1 | "The Four Last Things" | David Drury | Peter Ransley | 11 March 2007 | 7.10m |
Mary Appleton is ordained as the female curate in the fictitious diocese of Roslington. During her service, she is heckled by an old lady named Audrey Oliphant, while her carer, Angela Wharton, hides in the background behind the altar. Angela turns out to be a serial killer, and she kidnaps the Appletons' five-year-old child, telling her somewhat reluctant accomplice Eddie that 'this one is not like the others.' She then sends the girl's parents on a wild goose chase, and emotional roller-coaster, by leaving a number of other child body parts around the city, all of which bear some link to their daughter, including her boots, her cut hair and ribbon. Eddie later, whilst rummaging through some of her belongings, discovers evidence that Angela had faked her own death, and is possibly an imposter. Michael reveals to his wife that when he was eleven, he knew a girl named Rosie, who threatened to get back at him because he got her in trouble after having witnessed and reporting a murder. Michael also reveals Rosie's obsession with a young priest and heretic named Francis Youlgrave, a man who was himself obsessed with transubstantiation and supposedly ate the flesh and blood of orphaned children from the slums of North London. Rosie is later revealed to be hiding under the guise of Angela, having stolen Angela's identity, quite possibly after murdering her in order to use the body in her death deception. The child, Lucy, is brought back safely, but not before Angela brutally murders Eddie when he tries to hide and save Lucy from the former's murderous wrath, and return her to her parents. When they catch her in the act of slashing Eddie's throat, she attempts to implicate him as a paedophile, claiming to have been acting in the interest of protecting the child.
| 2 | "The Judgement of Strangers" | David Drury | Peter Ransley | 12 March 2007 | 6.52m |
After finishing her exams, Rosie goes to stay with her father, the parish priest David Byfield, only to find that he wants to marry again. His interest is a woman named Vanessa. Rosie initially opposes the idea, but then seemingly changes her mind. After the wedding, a woman named Juliana and the local historian Audrey Oliphant both try to obtain the Journals of Francis Youlgrave - who lived at the local manor house - from their owner, Lady Youlgrave. Lady Youlgrave used to own the local manor, but she later sold it to some hippies because she was too old to properly maintain it. Having learned that her exam results will not get her into Cambridge, Rosie takes out her anger on the young Michael, who has come to stay with them while his parents are on a second honeymoon. After Michael sees Rosie murder her stepmother and attempt to destroy the journals, he tells his family, and Rosie is arrested. However, before they take her away, she threatens the whole family by screaming, "You will all suffer for this!", seeming to target Michael specifically. Sometime after this, her father finds that Rosie has been released and apparently killed in a car crash, of which an 'Angela Wharton' is the sole witness.
| 3 | "The Office of the Dead" | David Drury | Peter Ransley | 13 March 2007 | 5.37m |
Wendy Appleton comes to stay with the family after breaking up with her husband and finds her friends' marriage is in just as bad a shape. Rosie's mother, Janet, cannot take care of her child due to a difficult pregnancy, and little Rosie is largely ignored by her father. She has a close relationship with her grandfather, Hugh, but things take a turn for the worse as he becomes senile. After David finds Hugh "cuddling" in bed with Rosie, he threatens to send him to a home. Hugh responds by saying, "I wish I was dead". That same night, after being sedated by his daughter Janet, he is murdered, and Janet commits suicide. She leaves a note saying that she is responsible for the old man's murder. However, later on, while eating at an ice cream parlour run by Audrey Strickland, Rosie reveals to Wendy that it was in fact she who killed Hugh and Janet simply covered it up. Alarmed, Wendy tells Rosie never to mention it to anyone. Later, Wendy gets back together with her husband and becomes pregnant with Michael.
