= Dudley Loftus (died 1616) =

Irish landowner and politician

Sir Dudley Loftus (1561 – 1616) was an Irish landowner and politician of the 16th and early seventeenth century.

Loftus was born in Rathfarnham, County Dublin in 1561. He was the eldest son of Adam Loftus, the Archbishop of Dublin and Jane Purdon. As well as his duties in the Church of Ireland he was one of the most powerful political figures in late Tudor Ireland who served as Lord Chancellor of Ireland.

He was married to Anne Bagenal, the youngest daughter of Sir Nicholas Bagenal, a leading figure of southern Ulster who had developed the town of Newry. It was a dynastic union between two powerful Anglo-Irish families, which produced five children. He died in Dublin in January 1616. His wife later remarried Lord Sarsfield.

His family had great influence in County Wexford, which continued to the next generation when two of his sons Sir Adam Loftus and Nicholas Loftus were elected to the 1640 Parliament of Ireland. A grandson, Arthur Loftus, was also elected out of Wexford that year.

== Bibliography ==
- Kearney, Hugh F. Strafford in Ireland 1633-1641: A Study in Absolutism. Cambridge University Press, 1989.
