= Anne Sarsfield, Viscountess Sarsfield =

Irish aristocrat

Anne Sarsfield, Viscountess Sarsfield was an Irish aristocrat of the 16th and 17th centuries. She was born Anne Bagenal, and should not be confused with her niece Anne Bagenal the daughter of her brother Henry.

She was the daughter of Sir Nicholas Bagenal, an English-born adventurer who had fled to Ireland following accusations of murder in his native Staffordshire. He received the patronage of the Gaelic lord Conn O'Neill, 1st Earl of Tyrone and established himself in Newry. Her mother was a Welsh woman Eleanor Griffith. Amongst her siblings were Sir Henry Bagenal, the Marshal of Ireland, and Mabel Bagenal, the wife of Hugh O'Neill, Earl of Tyrone whose forces killed Sir Henry at the 1598 Battle of the Yellow Ford during Tyrone's Rebellion.

Anne's first marriage was to Sir Dudley Loftus, the eldest son of Adam Loftus, the Archbishop of Dublin a leading figure in the Church of Ireland who also held political office in the Irish Government. Such dynastic alliances were typical of the newly established Protestant landed families of Ireland. She had five children with him including Sir Adam Loftus and Nicholas Loftus.

After his death in 1616, she remarried to Dominick Sarsfield, 1st Viscount Sarsfield a leading member of the Irish judiciary, who became Chief Justice of the Irish Common Pleas. Sarsfield was descended from an Old English family with strong Catholic links. He was a man of great strength of character, but as a judge became so notorious for corruption that he was finally removed from office in 1633. Although Dominick had conformed to Protestantism, his son and successor William Sarsfield, 2nd Viscount Sarsfield (the son of his first wife Joan Terry), was to become a Catholic.

== Bibliography ==
- Jackson, Donald. Intermarriage in Ireland, 1550-1650. Cultural and Educational Productions, 1970
- Morgan, Rhys. The Welsh and the Shaping of Early Modern Ireland, 1558-1641. Boydell & Brewer Ltd, 2014.
