= Dudley Bagenal (Jacobite) =

Irish soldier, politician and courtier (d.1712)

Colonel Dudley Bagenal or Bagnall (c.1638 – 27 July 1712) was an Irish soldier, Jacobite politician and courtier.

Bagenal was the eldest son of Colonel Walter Bagenal (great-grandson of Dudley Bagenal) and Elizabeth Roper, daughter of John Roper, 3rd Baron Teynham. Dudley was educated at St John's College, Oxford, matriculating 8 December 1658, and he entered the Middle Temple the same year to train in law. Bagenal was raised as a Protestant, but later reverted to the Roman Catholic faith of his parents.

Following the Stuart Restoration, on 26 February 1661, Bagenal was restored to the estates that had been seized from his father under The Protectorate. He served in the army of the Duke of York in the Second Anglo-Dutch War. Bagenal briefly fled to France during the Popish Plot owing to his Catholicism and association with the Duke of York. In 1685 he petitioned James II for a place at court, citing both his faith and his family's loyalty to the Stuarts. Bagenal remained loyal to James after the Glorious Revolution and in 1689 he was the Member of Parliament for County Carlow in the brief Patriot Parliament summoned by James. He was also appointed as the Jacobite Lord Lieutenant of Carlow from 1689 to 1690.

During the Williamite War in Ireland, Bagenal raised and commanded his own regiment for the Jacobites which was present at the Battle of the Boyne. He was attainted after the Jacobite defeat in 1691, forfeiting his life's interest in his estate. Bagenal emigrated to France shortly afterwards and was appointed a Gentleman Usher to James' exiled court at Château de Saint-Germain-en-Laye. He subsequently served at the court of James Francis Edward Stuart, but retired to Bruges where he died in 1712.

Bagenal married first Anne, only daughter of Hon. Edward Butler, son of Edmund Butler, 4th Viscount Mountgarret. In 1668 he married her cousin, Anne Mathew. He was succeeded by his eldest son, Lord Walter Bagenal.

Parliament of Ireland
Preceded by Sir John Temple; Sir William Temple, Bt	Member of Parliament for County Carlow; 1689; With: Henry Luttrell	Succeeded by Sir Thomas Butler, Bt; John Tench
