= Henry Bagenal =

16th-century English military officer

The Right Honourable Sir Henry Bagenal
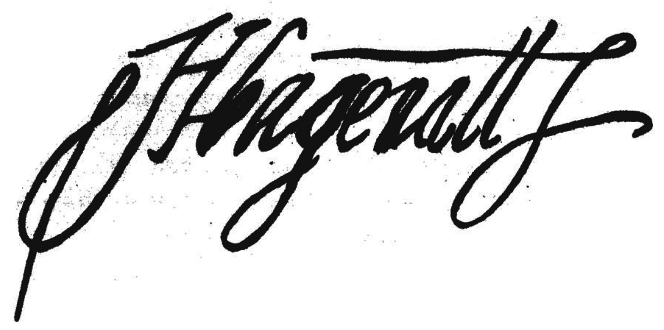
- Signature, 1581
- Born: c. 1556; England
- Died: 14 August 1598 (aged 41-42); County Armagh, Ireland
- Spouse: Eleanor Savage (m. 1586)

Sir Henry Bagenal PC (c. 1556 – 14 August 1598) was an English-born soldier who primarily served in Ireland. He was Marshal of the Royal Irish Army during the reign of Queen Elizabeth I.

== Early life and education ==
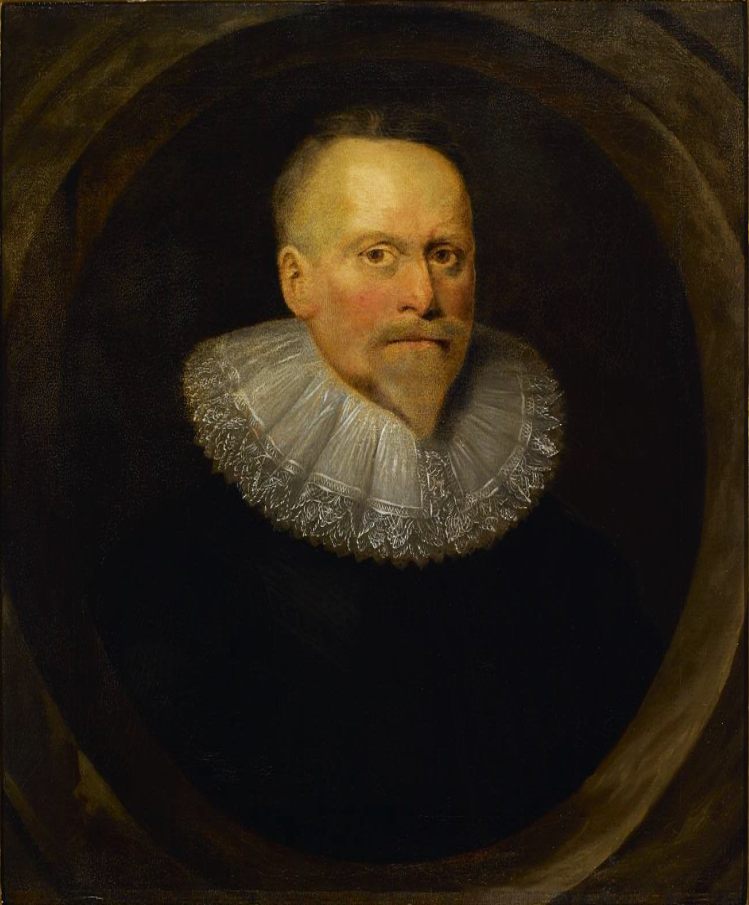
Bagenal's father, Nicholas Bagenal

Henry Bagenal (also spelt Bagnal) was born in England around 1556, to Sir Nicholas Bagenal, a Staffordshire soldier, and his wife Eleanor Griffith of Penrhyn, Wales. He was named after his godfather, statesman Henry Sidney. Henry Bagenal was the eldest son of eleven children, which included Dudley, Anne, Mary and Mabel.

Bagenal seemingly matriculated from Jesus College, Oxford, aged sixteen (around 1572), but he left without a degree to serve in Ireland with his father, who was then Marshal of the Army in Ireland. When Nicholas became chief commissioner of Ulster in 1577, Henry was made his father's assistant. He was knighted in 1578.

== Career ==
In May 1577, Sir Nicholas was appointed chief commissioner of Ulster, with Henry as his assistant. Bagenal was himself knighted in 1578. He was involved in some military disasters, such as a defeat at Glenmalure on 25 August 1580 when Lord Grey led the troops (with Bagenal one of the commanders of the rear) into battle with Fiach McHugh O'Byrne and Viscount Baltinglass in the Wicklow mountain passes. In 1584, Bagenal was colonel of the garrison at Carrickfergus when 1,300 of Sorley Boy MacDonnell's Scots landed on Rathlin Island. Bagenal attacked but was ambushed at Glenarm and had to retreat.

In May 1586, Bagenal was sent by his father to the court to report. He sought measures to weaken Hugh O'Neill, Earl of Tyrone, an enhancement of the role of the marshal, and a presidency in Ulster with a shire hall and jail to dispense royal justice. Whilst on his visit, he wrote to Edward Manners, 3rd Earl of Rutland (a relative of his wife) on 16 September 1586 to ask whether he had a parliamentary borough to spare; he was elected MP for both Grantham and Anglesey and chose the latter. He returned to Ireland in September 1587 to deputize for his father. He succeeded his father as marshal of the army in Ireland and chief commissioner for Ulster in October 1590, and was sworn of the Privy Council. His proposals for action were not accepted, as a decision had been taken to adopt a conciliatory attempt to O'Neill. To Bagenal's contempt, O'Neill asked for the hand of Bagenal's sister Mabel in marriage; he refused, but they eloped anyway.

On 17 August, the council dismissed Bagenal's claim that O'Neill had conferred with Cormac MacBaron O'Neill and Hugh Roe O'Donnell before the Battle of the Ford of the Biscuits. Bagenal's claims were proven correct by the testimony from captured woman Joan Kelly, who was present at the confederate camps.

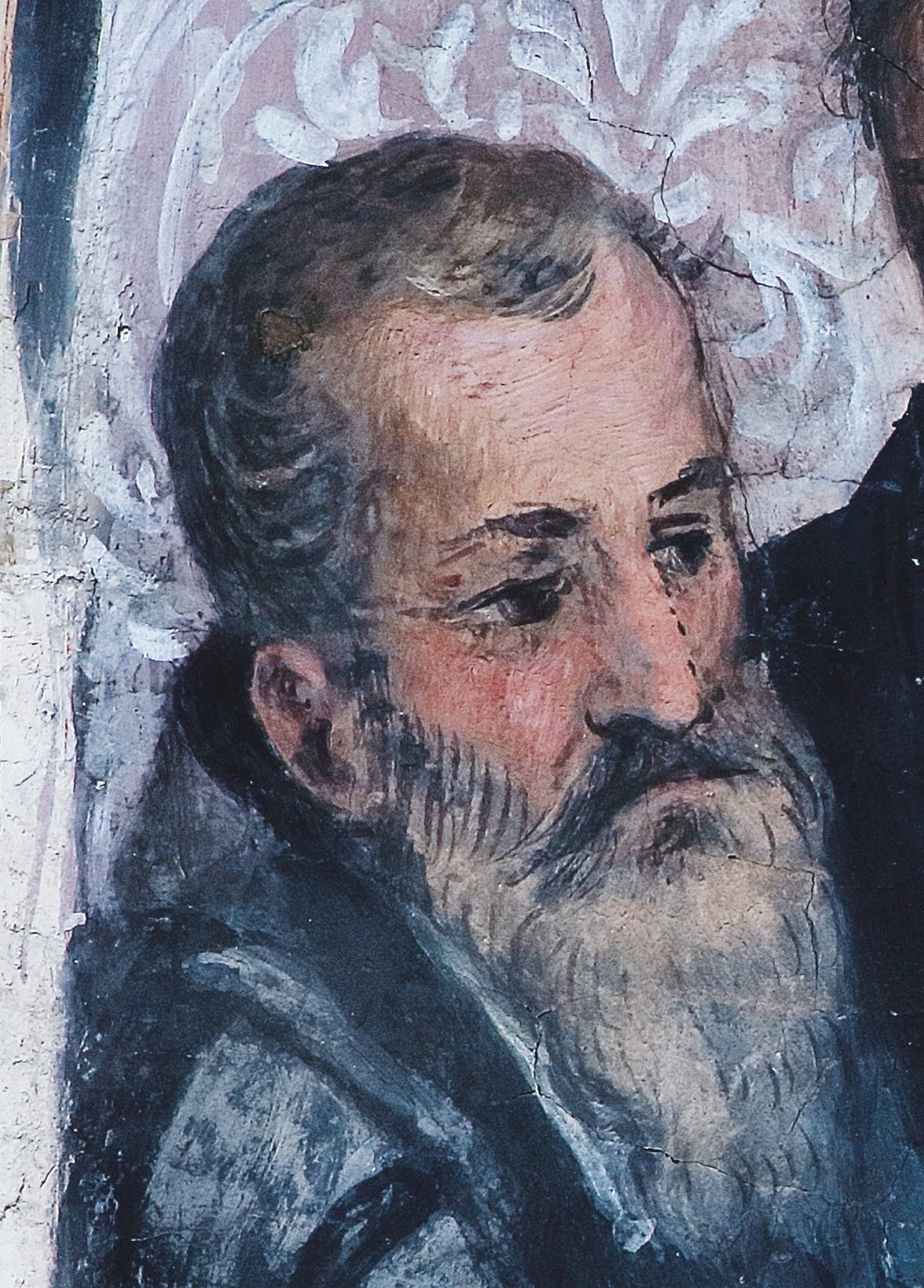
Hugh O'Neill, Earl of Tyrone has been called Bagenal's "arch-enemy".

In May 1595, Bagenal led an army of 1,750 to relieve the garrison at Monaghan. His forces were attacked by O'Neill and sustained heavy losses. Bagenal was forced to withdraw to Newry and had to be resupplied by sea as O'Neill had blocked the Moyry Pass. Bagenal managed to resupply the Armagh garrison in December 1598 and June 1597, but had more difficulty in resupplying a fort on the Blackwater. In an attempt to do so, he was fatally wounded by O'Neill's forces during Battle of the Yellow Ford in County Armagh. As Bagenal approached O'Neill's trenches, a bullet struck his forehead through his raised visor.

== Family ==
In September 1586, Bagenal married Eleanor Savage of Cheshire, daughter of Sir John Savage of Savage Rock and cousin of Edward Manners, 3rd Earl of Rutland. Bagenal had at least three sons and six daughters, either with his wife or in later relationships. His three sons were:

- Arthur Bagenal; mentally handicapped and became a ward of his uncle Patrick Barnewell
- Dudley Bagenal; founded the County Carlow branch of the Bagenal family
- Ambrose Bagenal

Henry Bagenal's daughters married wealthy Palesmen.

The senior Bagenal line died out in 1712 with the death of Henry's grandson Nicholas Bagenal; the junior but better-known branch in Carlow, who founded Bagenalstown, survived longer.

== In media ==
Brian Friel's 1988 play Making History focuses on the marriage between Bagenal's sister Mabel and Tyrone. Mabel and another sister, Mary Barnewall, are major characters in the play. Bagenal himself is often mentioned but does not appear on stage.

In 2021, Irish actor Aidan Gillen was attached to portray Bagenal in a television series titled The O'Neill. As of 2024, the series is unproduced.
