= Sir William Warren (died 1602) =

Irish landowner, statesman and soldier

Sir William Warren (c. 1558 – 1602) was an Irish landowner, statesman and soldier of the late sixteenth century. He is mainly remembered now for having facilitated the much-discussed marriage of Hugh O'Neill, Earl of Tyrone and his third wife Mabel Bagenal, which took place at Warren's home, Drumcondra Castle, in 1591.

== Family ==
Warren was the son of Captain Humphrey Warren (died 1561) and Elizabeth Clifford (died 1581). His father, a professional soldier of English birth, had come to Ireland in the service of the English Crown in about 1550. Little appears to be known of his family background. He enjoyed the confidence of three successive monarchs, and was a close associate of Thomas Radclyffe, 3rd Earl of Sussex, Lord Deputy of Ireland 1556-1558. He sat in the Irish House of Commons as member for Carrickfergus in the Parliament of 1559.

His marriage was a most advantageous one. Elizabeth Clifford was the daughter and co-heiress of Sir Nicholas Clifford of Sutton Valence and Bobbing in Kent, and his wife Mary Harper. She was the widow of Sir William Brabazon, the Vice-Treasurer of Ireland, and of Christopher Blount, a cousin of Baron Mountjoy. After Humphrey's death, she made a fourth marriage to Sir Edward Moore. William was thus born into the heart of the Anglo-Irish ruling class: he was a half-brother of Edward Brabazon, 1st Baron Ardee, and of Garret Moore, 1st Viscount Moore. His grandmother Mary Harper was the sister of Sir George Harper, a politician of some importance in the reign of Henry VIII. The Harper family had a connection by marriage to the King through his fifth Queen Catherine Howard, her mother Joyce Culpepper being a cousin of Alexander Culpepper, George's stepfather. Another powerful connection was Sir Conyers Clifford, Lord President of Connaught (died 1599), who was William's second cousin on his mother's side.

William and his brother Henry continued this family tradition of advantageous marriages: Henry married Alice Loftus, daughter of Adam Loftus, Archbishop of Dublin and his wife Jane Purdon, and William, sometime after 1586, married Jenet Finglas, daughter of Patrick Finglas of Westphailstown and widow of John Bathe, Chancellor of the Irish Exchequer. Through this marriage, he acquired for his lifetime possession of very substantial lands in County Dublin, and of Drumcondra Castle.

His wife's open adherence to the Roman Catholic faith caused him some trouble politically. At a time when Irish office holders were required to take the Oath of Supremacy, recognising Elizabeth I as head of the Church of Ireland, Warren was suspected, probably with good reason, of privately sharing his wife's religious beliefs. Of her first husband's children, two became Catholic priests, which inevitably raised questions about the religious upbringing they had received at home, especially as their father John Bathe had also been an open Catholic. There are numerous references in the Calendar of State Papers to Lady Warren's reception of Catholic priests at Drumcondra Castle, and the Crown kept a discreet eye on her activities even after Warren's death.

== William Warren and Hugh O'Neill ==
He was given a military command, and in April 1586 he was entrusted by the Lord Deputy of Ireland, Sir John Perrot, with the task of negotiating with Sorley Boy MacDonnell, a powerful Scottish chieftain who had challenged the authority of the English Crown by establishing a political base in County Antrim. Sorley had been on friendly terms with William's father Humphrey in the late 1550s, and William succeeded in persuading him to come to terms with Elizabeth I. William asked repeatedly to be made Governor of Carrickfergus, but without success. Like his half-brother Garrett, Lord Moore, he became a close friend and ally of Hugh O'Neill.

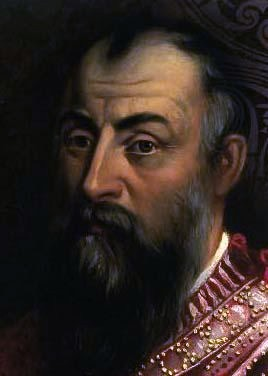
Hugh O'Neill, Earl of Tyrone- Warren was one of his closest associates.

=== Hugh O'Neill and Mabel Bagenal ===
Hugh O'Neill's third marriage in August 1591 to Mabel, daughter of Sir Nicholas Bagenal, Knight Marshal of Ireland, is one of the most romanticised episodes in Irish history: Mabel has been called "the Helen of Troy of Elizabethan Ireland". Whether it was a genuine love marriage (as suggested in the play Making History by Brian Friel) or whether it was an effort by O'Neill to form a political alliance with Mabel's powerful family is debatable. What is clear is the central role which Warren and his wife played in the marriage. Mabel, who had been living with her sister Mary and Mary's husband Patrick Barnewall at Turvey House, appeared at Drumcondra Castle, about six miles from Turvey, where she was quickly followed by O'Neill.

According to the detailed version of the events leading to the marriage given by Seán Ó Faoláin in his biography of O'Neill, Warren visited Turvey House to pay a call on Mabel, and pretended to "kidnap" her (in fact with her full connivance), and then rode to Drumcondra, where they were joined by O'Neill. Since Mabel wished to be married in a Protestant ceremony, the marriage was celebrated in Drumcondra Castle by Thomas Jones, Bishop of Meath, and future Archbishop of Dublin, although the Bishop, by his own account, performed the ceremony with great reluctance, and only to save Mabel's good name (although he remained on friendly terms with O'Neill for some time afterwards). The wedding was followed by five days of feasting, after which the newlyweds departed for O'Neill's home at Dungannon. Warren is said to have been a regular visitor to O'Neill's house in the following months, and to have accompanied him several times to Mass. These stories, whether true or false, can only have increased suspicions about his loyalty to the Crown.

=== Nine Years' War ===
The outbreak of the Nine Years' War, one of the most serious Irish rebellions against English rule, in which Hugh O'Neill was the overall commander on the Irish side, placed Warren in a very difficult position. Despite his English parentage and powerful Anglo-Irish family connections, his closeness to the "Arch-Rebel" O'Neill, and the long-held suspicion that he was secretly a Roman Catholic, inevitably raised serious questions about his own loyalties, although he maintained that he was prepared to fight against O'Neill, and also to persuade him to come to terms. By 1596 Warren's loyalty was so dubious that, despite being seriously ill, he was summoned to a hearing before the Irish Privy Council, where he was reprimanded and threatened with imprisonment, although the threat was not carried out.

== Later years ==
Warren's fortunes improved during the lord lieutenancy of Robert Devereux, 2nd Earl of Essex: Warren was in high favour with Essex, whom he entertained at Drumcondra Castle. After the downfall of Essex, Warren was quick to ingratiate himself with the new power at the English Court, Robert Cecil, 1st Earl of Salisbury. Through Cecil's favour he at last obtained the Governorship of Carrickfergus, but died soon afterwards.

He and Jenet had several daughters, one of whom married Warren's stepson James Bathe, but no son. At his death possession of his lands reverted to the Bathe family. His widow remarried as his second wife Terence O'Dempsey, 1st Viscount Clanmalier. She died in 1627; Lord Clanmalier died in 1638.

== Related sites ==
- Hugh O'Neill, Earl of Tyrone
- Making History
