= The Innocent (miniseries) =

- Genre: Crime drama
- Written by: Jan McVerry; Stephen Mallatratt
- Directed by: Sarah Harding
- Starring: Caroline Quentin; Paul Rhys; Clare Holman; Peter O'Brien; Michael Cochrane; Ben Miles; David Fleeshman
- Composer: Christopher Gunning
- Country of origin: United Kingdom
- Original language: English
- No. of series: 1
- No. of episodes: 2

Production
- Executive producer: Carolyn Reynolds
- Producer: Hugh Warren
- Cinematography: John Ignatius
- Editor: Edward Mansell
- Running time: 90 minutes
- Production company: Yorkshire Television

Original release
- Network: ITV
- Release: 7 January – 8 January 2001

The Innocent is a two-part British television crime drama, written by Jan McVerry and Stephen Mallatratt, that first broadcast on ITV on 7 January 2001. Directed by Sarah Harding, The Innocent tells the story of David Pastorov (Paul Rhys), a barrister accused of rape by one of his colleagues, Alison (Clare Holman). Although he initially denies the claims, when it later transpires that he slept with the alleged victim, his wife, Beth (Caroline Quentin), heavily pregnant with the couple's third child, struggles to believe his version of events.

The two episodes of The Innocent attracted 9.87 and 9.49 million viewers respectively. Despite going head-to-head with Rebel Heart, the BBC's controversial Irish War of Independence drama, which had attracted widespread criticism before its broadcast (which resulted in critics expecting it to draw a large audience), The Innocent drew nearly six million more viewers. Despite this, the series has never been released on DVD.

== Reception ==
Gareth McLean of The Guardian was slightly more critical, writing; "On paper - or in the Radio Times, at least - The Innocent hardly seemed like brave new drama. Focusing as it did on a schism between best friends, the subjectiveness of truth, and the compromises made and little lies told to live one's life, it appeared to be another off-the-peg contemporary drama. And with the misogyny of the legal system, the choices women have to make, and the loveliness of everyone's house thrown in, you could have been forgiven for not even turning on."

== Cast ==
- Caroline Quentin as Beth Pastorov
- Paul Rhys as David Pastorov
- Clare Holman as Alison Huntley
- Peter O'Brien as Paul Huntley
- Michael Cochrane as Harold Haig
- Ben Miles as Brian Percival
- David Fleeshman as Gareth Lloyd
- Nicholas Fry as Simon Lang
- Eleanor Lloyd-Davies as Scarlett Pastorov
- Jack Lloyd-Davies as Luke Pastorov
- Nathaniel Burrage-Light as Oliver Pastorov
- Susan Cookson as DC Morgan
- Joe Chadwin as Tom Huntley
- Madeleine Eglin as Annie Huntley
- John Griffin as Maurice Horovitch
- Andrew Scarborough as Mark Latimer
