= Christopher Barnewall =

Irish politician and landowner

Sir Christopher Barnewall (1522–1575) was a leading Anglo-Irish statesman of the Pale in the 1560s and 1570s. He was the effective Leader of the Opposition in the Irish House of Commons in the Parliament of 1568–71. He is remembered for building Turvey House, where he sheltered the future Catholic martyr Edmund Campion, for his impressive tomb in Lusk Church, and for the eulogy to him in Holinshed's Chronicles, which was written by his son-in-law Richard Stanyhurst.

== Background ==
He was the son of Patrick Barnewall, Solicitor General for Ireland (died 1552), and Anne Luttrell, daughter of Richard Luttrell of Luttrellstown Castle by his wife Margaret FitzLyons. Through both his father's parents, Roger Barnewall and his wife Alison, (also born Barnewall), he was closely related to the senior branch of the Barnewall family, who held the title Baron Trimleston. His father, a protege of Thomas Cromwell, was a key figure in the Irish administration between 1535 and 1542. Patrick initially opposed the Dissolution of the Monasteries, but quickly changed his mind, and profited handsomely from the Dissolution, acquiring Grace Dieu Abbey in Dublin and Knocktopher in Kilkenny. Christopher himself built Turvey House near the ruins of Grace Dieu, reputedly using the Abbey's stones as the building material. The dispossessed nuns of Grace Dieu were however allowed to live nearby at Portrane. Turvey House stood till 1987, when it was demolished, in controversial circumstances, on the orders of Dublin County Council.

Unlike his father and his maternal uncle Thomas Luttrell, who both went on to become eminent judges, he did not practise at the Irish Bar. Nor was he a Bencher of the King's Inns, which his father had helped to found, although he was a party to the renewal of the lease of the Inns from the Crown in 1567. He may have had some legal training, since Thomas Butler, 10th Earl of Ormonde, of whom he was a close associate, appointed Barnewall in 1556 as steward and receiver of all the Earl's lands within the Pale.

== Politics ==
He sat in the Irish House of Commons, probably as a member for County Dublin, in the Parliament of 1568–71, and was Sheriff of County Dublin in 1560. He played a major role in Elizabeth I's second Irish Parliament, especially in the crucial year 1569. He was the effective leader of the Anglo-Irish landowners of the Pale, who were opposed to the Court party, which supported the Lord Deputy of Ireland, Sir Henry Sidney. His supporters attempted to have Barnewall chosen as Speaker of the House of Commons but he was defeated by the Crown candidate James Stanyhurst. Barnewall assumed the role of Leader of the Opposition, concentrating his assault on the composition of the House, which he alleged had been "packed" with Crown supporters; in particular he objected to the presence of certain English members who represented boroughs where they did not live, and which in many cases they had never even visited. He brought a legal challenge to the validity of the House's composition, but although the judges ruled in his favour on two technical points, he was not successful in excluding the absentee members, and Sidney was able to get his program of legislation through Parliament without serious difficulty.

== Edmund Campion ==
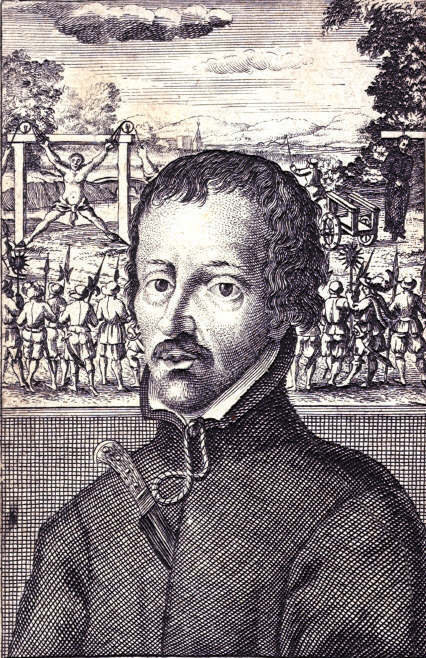
Edmund Campion

As a Member of Parliament Barnewall was required under the Act of Supremacy (Ireland) 1560 to acknowledge Elizabeth I as head of the Church. This was an advantageous step since his family had benefitted greatly from the suppression of the religious houses, and, despite their private religious beliefs, they had no wish to lose the monastic lands which they had acquired.

Christopher's own private sympathies were undoubtedly with the Catholic faith, which his son Patrick was later to openly champion. Christopher agreed to shelter the future martyr Edmund Campion in 1569, at the request of his future son-in-law Richard Stanyhurst (son of James), who was Campion's pupil. Campion spent several weeks at Turvey House and later acknowledged Barnewall's role in saving his life. James Stanyhurst was also involved in sheltering Campion, which suggests that despite their sharp political rivalry, he and Barnewall were prepared to cooperate on certain issues.

== Death and memorials ==
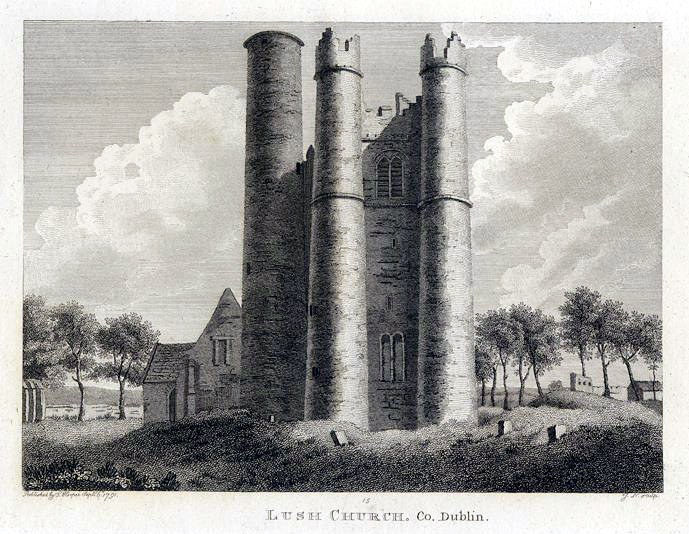
View of Lusk Church in 1791

Barnewall died in 1575 at Turvey and was buried in Lusk Church. His widow Marion, who remarried Sir Lucas Dillon, commissioned an impressive tomb for her "first and loving husband", dated 1589, which still exists. Her second husband apparently paid for it, suggesting that he shared the generally high opinion of Barnewall's character. Marion died in June 1607 and was buried in the same tomb as Christopher.

He is also commemorated by the Sarsfieldstown Cross near Laytown. The inscription promises a perpetual indulgence to those who pray for Barnewall's soul.

== Character ==
Holinshed's Chronicles contains a remarkable tribute to Barnewall; the warmly personal tone is explained by the fact that it was written by Richard Stanyhurst, who knew Barnewall all his life and married his daughter Janet:

the lantern and light as well of his house as of that part of Ireland where he dwelt, who being sufficiently well furnished with the knowledge of the Latin tongue as of the common law of England, was zealously bent on the reformation of his country; a deep and a wise gentleman, spare of speech and therewithal pithy, wholly addicted to gravity....very upright in dealing, measuring all his affairs with the safety of conscience, as true as steel....fast to his friend, stout in a good quarrel, a great householder....of nature mild, rather choosing to pleasure where he might harm than harm where he might pleasure.

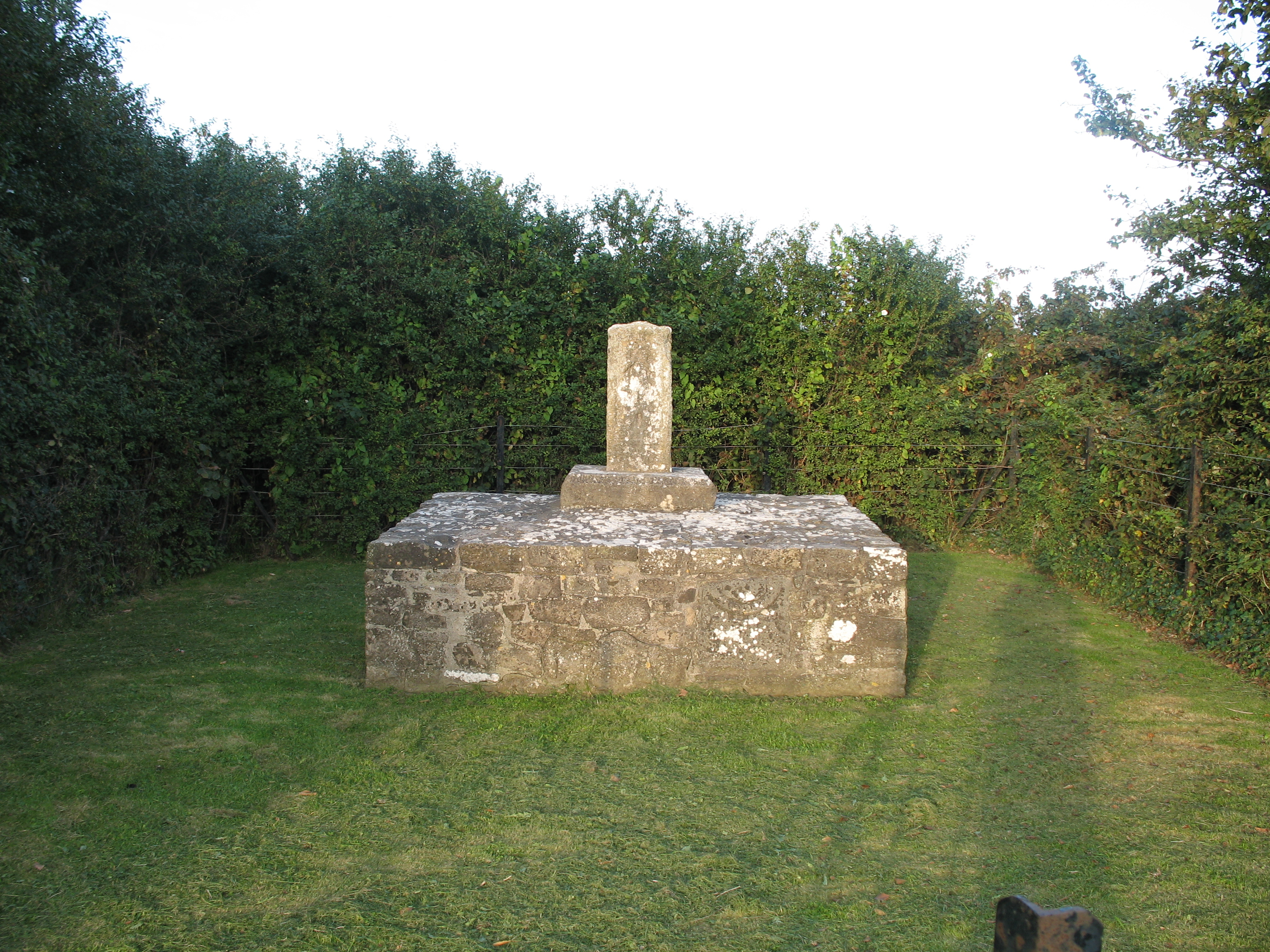
Barnewall Cross at The Gullet, Sarsfieldstown, Co Meath

== Family ==
Barnewall married Marion Sherle, daughter of Patrick Sherle of Shallon, County Meath; she inherited the estate of Shallon from her brother John. She and John had been wards of her father-in-law after her mother's death. They had nineteen children, of whom thirteen reached adulthood:

- Patrick (died 1622), who inherited his father's estates, and was the father of the 1st Viscount Barnewall
- John (died 1599) of Flemington, who married Cecily Cusack, widow of Christopher St Lawrence, 8th Baron Howth, by whom he had a son and heir, Patrick
- Catherine, who married Thomas Finglas of Westphailstown
- Margaret (died 1576), who married Nicholas St Lawrence, 9th Baron Howth, and had three children, including Christopher St Lawrence, 10th Baron Howth
- Janet (1560–1579), who married the celebrated historian Richard Stanyhurst
- Alison, who married firstly John Plunkett and secondly Sir Edward FitzGerald of Tecroghan, County Meath
- Elizabeth (died 1607), who married Richard (or John) Finglas of Westphailstown
- Anne (died 1639), who married Sir John Draycott of Mornington, County Meath, son of Henry Draycott, Master of the Rolls in Ireland, and had six children
- Mabel (died 1620), who married Sir Richard Masterson of Ferns, County Wexford
- Ismay, who married Richard Delahide of Moyglare (grandson of James Delahide, who was attainted for treason in 1537 as a "prime instigator" of the Rebellion of Silken Thomas), and had issue
- Eleanor (or Helen) (died 1628), who married James Dillon, 1st Earl of Roscommon (theirs was reputedly a love match)
- Maud, who married Richard Nugent
- Mary, who married Patrick Plunkett, 7th Baron Dunsany.

Lady Barnewall remarried in 1578 the prominent judge Sir Lucas Dillon, who was the father (by his first wife Jane Bathe) of Eleanor's husband, James Dillon, 1st Earl of Roscommon, as well as eleven other children. She died in June 1607 and was buried beside her first husband at Lusk.
