= Clare Holman =

English actress

- Born: 12 January 1964 (age 62); London, England
- Education: Guildhall School of Music and Drama
- Occupation: Actress
- Years active: 1988–present
- Spouse: Howard Davies (m. 2005; died 2016)

Clare Margaret Holman (born 12 January 1964) is an English actress. She portrayed forensic pathologist Laura Hobson in the crime drama series Inspector Morse and its spin-off Lewis from 1995 to 2015.

== Early life and education ==
Holman was born in London, England. She studied acting at the Guildhall School of Music and Drama.

== Career ==
Holman started her acting career in the 1988 television film The Rainbow based on the novel by D.H. Lawrence, directed by Stuart Burge.

In 1989 she played the part of the school teacher Mary Llewellyn in an adaptation of The Fifteen Streets by Catherine Cookson.

In 1991, she played Iris Bentley, sister to Derek Bentley, played by Christopher Eccleston, in the film Let Him Have It, and in 1992, she voiced Juliet in the Shakespeare: The Animated Tales adaptation of Romeo and Juliet.

She played Harper in the Royal National Theatre's production of Tony Kushner's Angels in America in November 1993. In 1995, Holman was cast as Laura Hobson in the crime drama series Inspector Morse, where she continued to play that part until 2000 when the series ended.

Holman was nominated for a 1997 Laurence Olivier Theatre Award for Best Actress in a Supporting Role in 1996 for her performance in Who's Afraid of Virginia Woolf?. She appeared in three episodes of Midsomer Murders as three different characters. The episodes are entitled Country Matters (2005), Ring Out Your Dead (2002), and The Miniature Murders (2019).

In 2006, Holman reprised her role of Dr Hobson in the series Lewis, which series ended in 2015. She appeared in all 33 episodes.

In 2007, Holman played Wendy the narrator and mother of Michael in the television series Fallen Angel, a story about Rosie Byfield, a clergyman's daughter who grows up to be a psychopathic killer, starring Emilia Fox.

She portrayed Anglo-Irish noblewoman Mabel Bagenal in Brian Friel's play Making History.

In October 2013 she played the role of Liz in the Tricycle Theatre production of the Moira Buffini play Handbagged, and in 2015, Holman appeared in the film Suite Francaise. From April to May 2015, she appeared as Myra Bolton in Doris Lessing's play, Each His Own Wilderness, at the Orange Tree Theatre in Richmond, London.

Holman has directed six episodes of Doctors in 2010 and two episodes of Holby City in 2012.

== Personal life ==
Holman was married to Howard Davies. They married in April 2005 in Stratton, Cornwall, and were together until his death in October 2016. She has stepchildren and stepgrandchildren from her husband's previous marriage. She supports ending violence against girls, contributing to Plan UK, part of the world's biggest campaign for girls' rights.

== Filmography ==
Year	Title	Role	Notes
1988	The Rainbow	Gudrun Brangwen	
1989	The Fifteen Streets	Mary Llewellyn	
1989	Shalom Salaam	Jackie	5 Episodes
1989	Boon	Isobel Sheridan	1 Episode
1989	The Woman in Black	Stella Kidd	
1990	Screen Two	Clio / Jenny	2 Episodes
1991	Let Him Have It	Iris Bentley	
1991	Afraid of the Dark	Rose	
1992	Shakespeare: The Animated Tales	Juliet	Voice
1993	Boiling Point	Nikki	
1994	Tom & Viv	Louise Purdon	
	Paris	Sister Annette	
1995–2000	Inspector Morse	Laura Hobson	
1996	Giving Tongue	Jessie Fielding MP	
1996	The Bill	Jane Laker	1 Espisode
1996	Frontiers	DI Louise Raynor	6 Episodes
1996	Out of The Blue	Barbara Garnham	1 Episode
1996	Soldier Soldier	DS Williams	1 Episode
1997–1999	The Lakes	Simone Fisher	11 Episodes
1998	Big Women	Zoe	3 Episodes
1999	Love in the 21st century	Sarah	Episode: "Toyboys"
1999	Kid in the Corner	Theresa Letts	1 Episode
1999	David Copperfield	Rosa Dartle	1 Episode
2000	Ruth Rendell Mysteries	Fay Devenish	1 Episode
2000	Murder Rooms: The Dark Beginnings of Sherlock Holmes	Helena Petchey	Episode: "The Photographer's Chair"
2001	The Innocent	Alison Huntley	
2002	Silent Witness	Theresa Dalton	2 Episodes: "Closed Ranks" (Parts 1 & 2)
2002–2019	Midsomer Murders	Fiona Beauvoisin / Rose Southerly / Sue Tutt	"The Miniature Murders" (2019), "Country Matters" (2006), "Ring Out Your Dead" (2002)
2003	Island at War	Felicity Dorr	6 Episodes
2003	Henry VIII	Catherine Parr	2 Episodes, part 2
2003	Agatha Christie: Sparkling Cyanide	Alexandra Farraday	Episode: "Sparkling Cyanide"
2003	Prime Suspect 6: The Last Witness	Elizabeth Lukic	1 Episode
2004	Messiah: The Promise	Jaine Ellis	2 Episodes
2005	Digital Reaper	Mary Daines	
2006	Blood Diamond	News Reporter #2	
2006	Agatha Christie's Marple	Miss Packard	Episode: "By The Pricking of My Thumbs"
2006–2015	Lewis	Laura Hobson	
2006	New Tricks	Sgt Beth Coulthard	
2007	Fallen Angel	Wendy Ellis	
2008	The Escort	N/A	Writer & Director; nominated at the International Film Festival of Wales
2009	Heartbeat	Sheena Buckley	Episode: "Sweet Sorrow"
2011	Death in Paradise	Molly Kerr	Episode: "Predicting Murder"
2013	Scott & Bailey	Sarah Gallagher	1 Episode
2015	Suite Francaise	Marthe	
2016	Silent Witness	Claudia Baxter	2 Episodes: "River's Edge" (Parts 1 & 2)
2016	Waiting for You	Janet	
2017	Rellik	Rebecca Barker	
2017	The Crown	Princess Marina, Duchess of Kent	Episode: "Mystery Man"
2018	The Little Drummer Girl	Miss Bach	TV Series, 6 episodes
2018	Only the Lonely	N/A	Director; short film
2019	Dead Pixels	Sylvia	Episode: "Betrothal"
2019	MotherFatherSon	Colonel Reese	TV Mini-Series, 3 Episodes
2019	Agatha Raisin	Robin Barley	Episode: "The Haunted House"
2020	Cursed	Lady Cacher	"Bring Us in Good Ale", "The Fey Queen"
2022	Sherwood	Helen St. Clair	6 episodes
2022	Treason	Mary Angelis	Netflix Series, 3 episodes
2023	Vera	Annie Laidlore	Episode: "The Rising Tide"
2023	The Diplomat	Paula	Series 1 Episodes 5 and 6
