= Lord Walter Bagenal =

Irish noble

Lord Walter Bagenal (1670–1745) was a member of the prominent Bagenal family, who resided in Dunleckney Manor in County Carlow, Ireland. Bagenal founded the town of Bagenalstown on the River Barrow, modelling it on Versailles, France.

He was the son of Colonel Dudley Bagenal and Ann Matthew. His father was descended from an earlier Dudley Bagenal, younger son of Sir Nicholas Bagenal, founder of the Irish Bagenals; Nicholas lived in Newry, but his son became a major landowner in Carlow. The family were traditionally Catholic, but Walter turned Protestant to hold on to the estates. Though sometimes referred to as Lord Bagenal he does not in fact seem to have held a title.

Walter married firstly Eleanor Barnewall and secondly Eleanor Beauchamp. He had a son, Beauchamp and three daughters.

The Lord Bagenal Inn is currently the name of a restaurant and hotel in Leighlinbridge, Co. Carlow.
