= Nicholas Bagenal (Welsh MP) =

English-Welsh MP

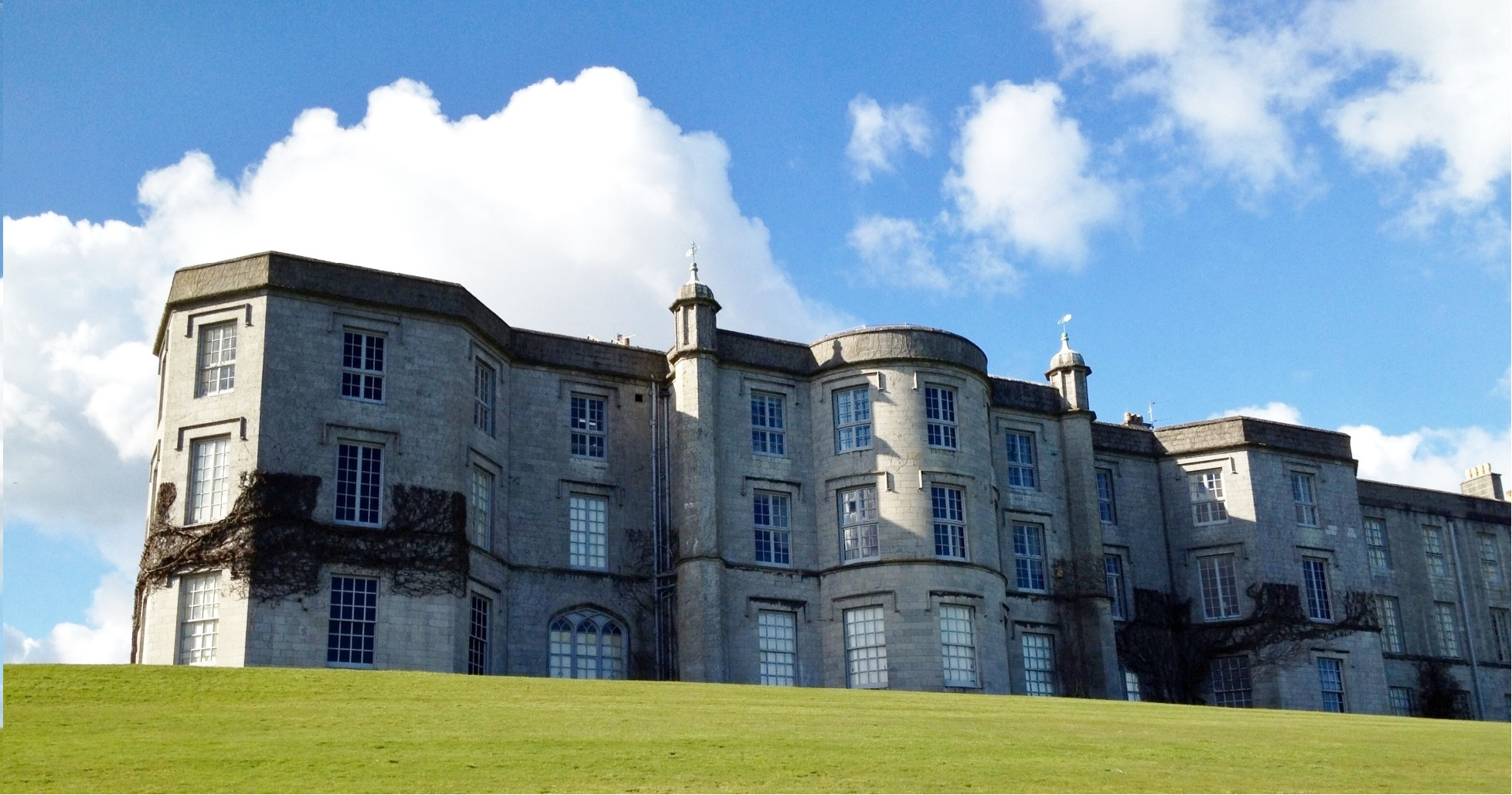
Plas Newydd today

Nicholas Bagenal or Bagenall (1629–1712) was an English MP for Anglesey, Wales.

== Life ==
Nicholas Bagenal was born in Bath, Somerset, the son of Arthur Bagenal and Magdalene Trevor, daughter of Sir Richard Trevor of Trevalyn, Denbighshire. He was the grandson of Henry Bagenal, Marshal of the Army in Ireland. He owned estates at Plas Newydd in Anglesey and in Newry, County Down.

Bagenal was a commissioner of Assessment for Anglesey (1647–1648, 1660–1680), for Caernarvon (1660–1663, 1664–1680), and for Anglesey and Caernarvon (1689–1690). He was elected MP for Anglesey in 1661, and was a Deputy Lieutenant (1661–?1680, 1689–1712) and Custos Rotulorum for Anglesey (1689-1690). He was elected a Fellow of the Royal Society in 1664.

== Legacy ==
On Nicholas Bagenal's death with no surviving heirs, the family estates at Anglesey and Newry passed respectively to his cousins, Edward Bayly and Robert Needham, and ultimately to the Marquess of Anglesey and the Earl of Kilmorey. He had married twice, firstly to Sidney Grosvenor, daughter of Sir Richard Grosvenor of Eaton, Cheshire, without surviving issue. He married secondly to Lady Anne Charlotte Bruce, daughter of Robert Bruce, 1st Earl of Ailesbury and Lady Diana Grey, with whom he had a son, Nicholas Bagenall who was smothered by his nurse at the age of two months, and a daughter, Elizabeth Bagenal, who also predeceased him.
