= Adam Loftus (politician) =

Irish politician and public official

Sir Adam Loftus was an Irish politician and public official of the seventeenth century.

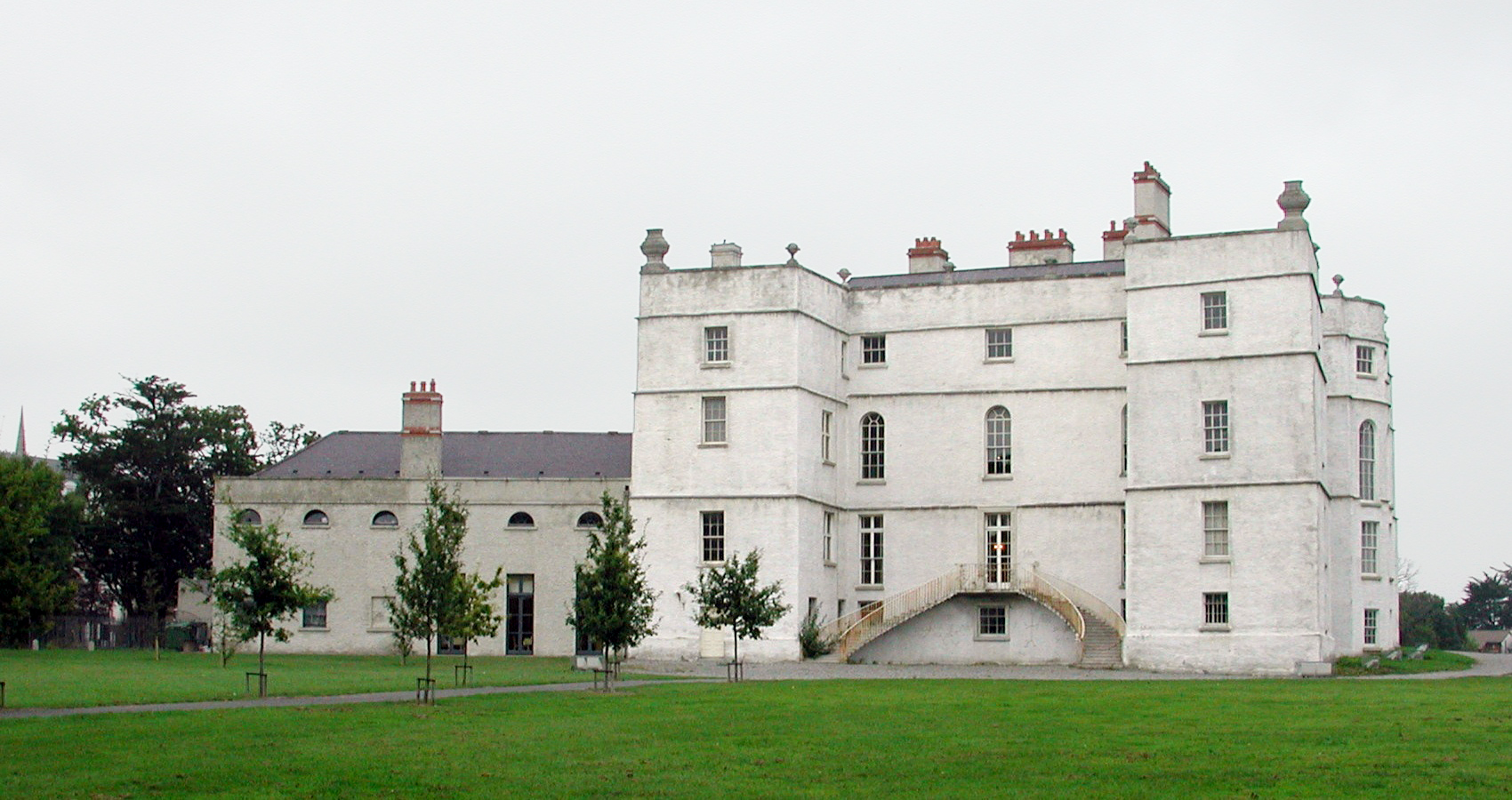
Rathfarnham Castle, County Dublin - the Loftus family seat

He was the eldest son of Sir Dudley Loftus, and part of a powerful Anglo-Irish Leinster family. His mother was Anne Bagenal of a leading Ulster family. He was born and lived at Rathfarnham, County Dublin. He was the cousin of Lord Loftus, the Lord Chancellor of Ireland between 1619 and 1639.

Adam was appointed as Vice-Treasurer of Ireland, replacing Lord Mountnorris in the post. He became a client of the Lord Deputy of Ireland Thomas Wentworth, who had him made a member of the Irish Council. Adam's younger brother Nicholas Loftus also received a position at the Treasury as Clerk of the Pells.

He sat for the County Wexford seat of Newborough in the 1634 and 1640 Parliaments of Ireland where he was grouped as a supporter of Wentworth. His brother Nicholas, and his son Arthur Loftus, also represented Wexford seats.

He was married to Jane Vaughan, the daughter of Walter Vaughan of Golden Grove, Carmarthenshire, with whom he had a number of children including Arthur Loftus and Dudley Loftus. His grandson was Lord Lisburn who died at the 1691 Siege of Limerick while fighting on the Williamite side.

== Bibliography ==
- Kearney, Hugh F. Strafford in Ireland 1633-1641: A Study in Absolutism. Cambridge University Press, 1989.
- Article on Dudley Loftus by Elizabethanne Boran in the 'Dictionary of Irish Biography'.
