= Grace Dieu Abbey =

Augustine female religious institution, County Dublin, Ireland

The Grace Dieu Abbey was an Augustinian abbey in County Dublin, Ireland. It was founded about 1190 by John Comyn, Archbishop of Dublin, to house an order of nuns, the Sisters of St. Augustine. It derived most of its income from lands at Lusk and Swords, County Dublin. Over the centuries, it became mainly a refuge for the unmarried daughters of the Anglo-Irish landowners of the Pale, and no doubt for this reason, at the Dissolution of the Monasteries, there were pleas for its continuance. Nonetheless, it was suppressed in 1541 and acquired by Patrick Barnewall, the Solicitor General for Ireland. Barnewall's son, Sir Christopher Barnewall, built Turvey House nearby, reputedly from the stones of Grace Dieu, of which only ruins now survive. Christopher did find a refuge for the dispossessed nuns at Portrane. Turvey House itself was demolished in controversial circumstances in 1987 on the orders of Dublin County Council, a step later described by conservationists as a "tragedy".

== See also ==
- List of abbeys and priories in Ireland (County Dublin)
