= Dungannon Castle =

Former castle in County Tyrone, Northern Ireland

- Dungannon, County Tyrone, Northern Ireland
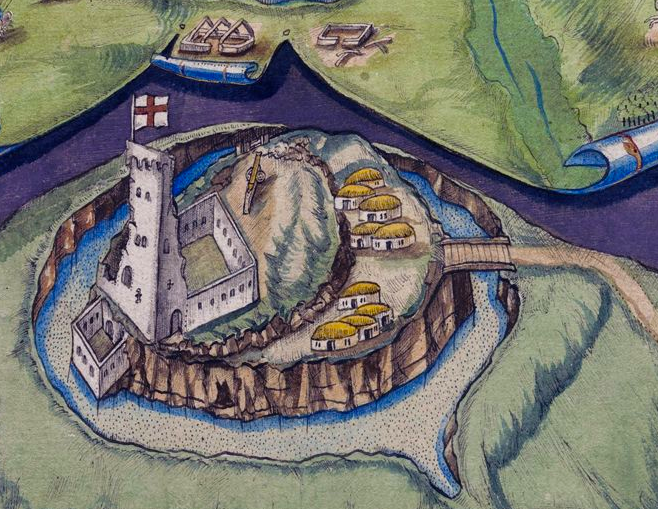
- 1602 drawing of Dungannon Castle by Richard Bartlett

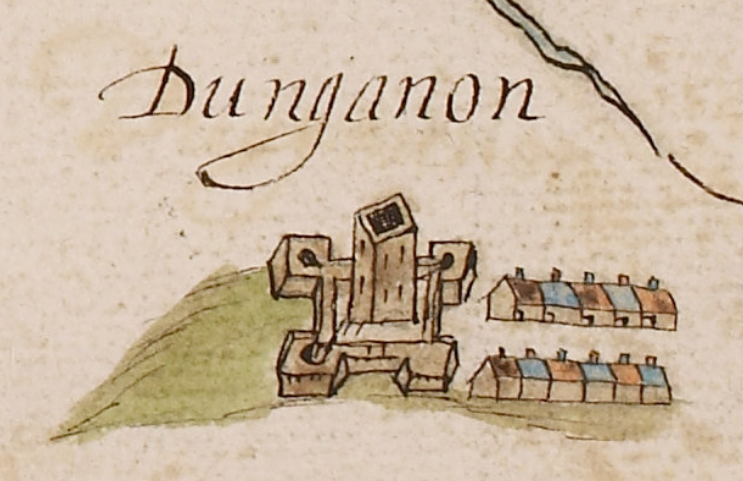
- 1624 drawing of Dungannon Castle by Nicolas Pynnar

Site information
- Condition: Ruin

Location
- Coordinates: 54.50565°N 6.7678°W

Dungannon Castle was a castle at Dungannon, County Tyrone, Northern Ireland.

== History ==
In 1305 a castle was built there by Domnall O'Neill, on what is today known as Castle Hill, one of the highest points in the area, which dominated the surrounding countryside with the ability to see seven counties depending on the weather.

During the 15th century a tower house was known to have been constructed upon the site. Conn Mor O'Niell was in residence during 1483, and in 1559 Shane O'Neill burnt the castle to prevent use by English forces. The O'Donnells demolished the castle in 1590. The castle was burned in 1595 and in 1602 by Hugh O'Neill, 2nd Earl of Tyrone as Crown forces under Charles Blount, Lord Mountjoy closed in on the Gaelic lords towards the end of the Nine Years' War. In 1607, ninety-nine Irish chieftains and their followers, including Hugh O'Neill, set sail from Rathmullan, bound for the continent. What followed became known as the Plantation of Ulster and the town and its castle were granted to Sir Arthur Chichester, the architect of the Plantation. Chichester rebuilt the castle and this castle was undermined and captured by Felim O'Neill of Kinard in 1641. The castle was again slighted in 1690. The land was sold to Thomas Knox, 1st Earl of Ranfurly who built a mansion house on the site. The two ruined towers are the remains of this structure.

Its location ultimately led to the British Army taking over the site in 1950 for a security installation during The Troubles, then the police, being returned to the local council only in August 2007.

The castle was partially excavated in 2003. It was again excavated in October 2007, by the Channel 4 archaeological show Time Team, leading to the uncovering of part of the moat and walls of the castle.
