= Nicholas Bagenal =

Member of the Parliament of England

Sir Nicholas Bagenal
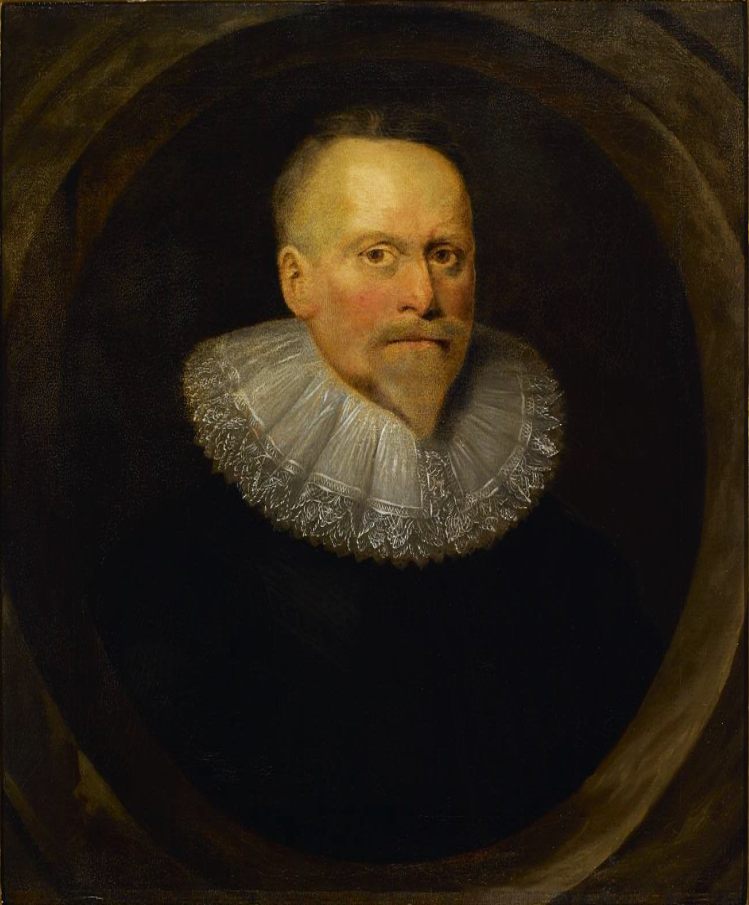
- Portrait by unknown artist

Personal details
- Born: c. 1509 Newcastle-under-Lyme, Staffordshire, England
- Died: February 1591 (aged 81–82) Newry, Ireland
- Spouse: Eleanor Griffith
- Children: Sir Henry Bagenal, Dudley Bagenal, Ambrose, Frances, Mary, Margaret, Isabel, Anne Sarsfield, Mabel Bagenal
- Parent(s): John Bagenall, Eleanor Whittingham

Sir Nicholas Bagenal (Note: Also spelt Bagenall, Bagnal, and Bagnall) (/ˈbæɡnəl/; c. 1509 – February 1591) was an English soldier and politician who became Marshal of the Irish Army during the Tudor era.

== Early life ==
Nicholas Bagenal was born around 1509. (Note: Sources give his birthdate as circa 1509 or circa 1510.) He was the second son of John Bagenal (died 1558), a tailor who served as Mayor of Newcastle-under-Lyme, by his wife Eleanor Whittingham of Middlewich, Cheshire. Eleanor was a second cousin of William Whittingham, Dean of Durham. Nicholas's elder brother, Sir Ralph Bagenal, was a courtier of Henry VIII.

In 1538, Nicholas fled to Ireland to escape justice for killing a man in the Staffordshire village of Leek; his two brothers were apparently also involved in this crime. In Ireland, he became acquainted with Con O'Neill, 1st Earl of Tyrone and on 7 December 1542 the Irish council, at the suit of Tyrone, begged the King to pardon Bagenal. Bagenal returned to England in April 1544 and took part in the campaign in France in the following summer.

The Bagenals had family links with the Irish government through Sir Patrick Barnewall, who was the Master of the Rolls in Ireland and married to Anne Luttrell, a cousin of Nicholas. This connection may help to explain how Nicholas was recommended for military service in France in 1544. His descendants gave their name to Bagenalstown in County Carlow. During the Colonial wars, his whole family were involved in the undertaking of land in Ireland. The Barnewall connection continued: Bagenal's daughter Mary married Barnewall's nephew, the younger Patrick.

== Career ==
In March 1547, Bagenal was appointed Marshal of the Army in Ireland by Edward VI. His salary was £73 a year. In November 1551 he was sent by James Croft to expel the Scots who had invaded Dufferin. He was knighted in the same year, and on 22 April 1552, was granted the lands of St. Patrick's and Saint Benedict and St. Mary's Abbey, of Newry and the Cistercian abbey of Carlingford, County Louth. When Mary I’s accession took place, Bagenal lost his office of marshal, which she conferred on Sir George Stanley. Accordingly, with this change on 7 May 1556, he was fined a thousand pounds. In 1559, he was elected to Parliament as member for Newcastle-under-Lyme.

When Queen Elizabeth I of England succeeded to the throne on her sister's passing, Sir George Stanley was asked to continue as marshal in Ireland and on 23 April 1562, Bagenal wrote to the Queen complaining that his lands brought him in nothing, owing to the depredations of Shane O'Neill. Bagenal was reduced to the role of a Captain until Sir Nicholas Arnold's recommendations induced the Queen to reappoint him marshal in 1565, with Sir Henry Sidney as deputy. Bagenal's patent was dated 5 October 1565, but he had scarcely taken up the office when, early in 1566, he entered into an agreement to sell it and his lands to Sir Thomas Stukley who was a close friend of the Pope. The Queen was unhappy with the arrangement and insisted he remain marshal. In May 1577 Sir Nicholas was also appointed chief commissioner of Ulster, with his son Henry Bagenal, born 1556 in Carlingford, as his assistant.

He was involved in some military disasters, such as a defeat at Glenmalure on 25 August 1580 when Arthur Grey, 14th Baron Grey de Wilton led the troops (with Bagenal one of the commanders of the rear) into battle with Fiach McHugh O'Byrne and Viscount Baltinglass in the Wicklow mountain passes. In 1584, Bagenal was colonel of the garrison at Carrickfergus when 1,300 of Sorley Boy MacDonnell's Scots landed on Rathlin Island. Bagenal attacked but was ambushed at Glenarm and had to retreat.

On 26 August 1583 his son, now Sir Henry Bagenal, obtained the reversion of the post of marshal and acted as his father's deputy. Sir Nicholas was appointed chief commissioner on 6 July 1584 for the government of Ulster, and in April 1585 he was returned to the Irish Parliament as member for County Down.

In January 1586 Sir John Perrot complained that Nicholas Bagenal was too old to perform his duties as marshal; a feud between Bagenal and Perrot lasted until the lord deputy was recalled. On one occasion (15 July 1587) there was an affray between the two in Perrot's house, where they were both drinking heavily. Bagenal was pushed to the ground after lunging out at Perrot. On 20 October 1590 Bagenal resigned the office of marshal asking for the post to be conferred on his son, Sir Henry.

== Death and legacy ==
Sir Nicholas died at Newry Castle, and was buried on 7 February 1591. It is more than likely the case that he died in the Green Castle where he lived with his son Henry (State Papers). He is presumed buried in the tower of Saint Patrick's church, which he is alleged to have built in 1578.

== Family ==
Sir Nicholas married Eleanor Griffith, daughter of Sir Edward Griffith of Penrhyn, son of Sir William Griffith and had at least nine children. According to the Dictionary of Irish Biography, they had eleven children. According to the Oxford Dictionary of National Biography, they had five sons and six daughters.

Issue of Nicholas Bagenal and Eleanor Griffith
Name	Birth	Death	Spouse	Notes	
Henry	c. 1556, England or Carlingford	14 August 1598, County Armagh	Eleanor Savage (married 1586)		Eldest son
Dudley	1554	March 1587, County Carlow	Katherine Nagle Mabel Fitzgerald		
Mary		1609	Patrick Barnewall (married 1582)		
Anne			Dudley Loftus Dominick Sarsfield, 1st Viscount Sarsfield		
Ambrose				Died without issue	
Frances			Oliver Plunkett, 4th Baron Louth		
Margaret			Christopher Plunkett		
Isabel			Edward Kynaston		
Mabel	c. 1571, Newry	December 1595, Newry	Hugh O'Neill, Earl of Tyrone (married 1591)	Died without issue	Sixth daughter; eleventh child

Henry succeeded his father as Marshal, played a leading part in the Nine Years War. His son Henry was killed during the greatest defeat the English suffered in Ireland at the Battle of Yellow Ford in County Armagh on 14 August 1598 in action against his brother-in-law Tyrone. The landowner and politician Nicholas Bagenal, who was the Member of Parliament (MP) for Anglesey and Custos Rotulorum of Anglesey, lived 1629 to 1712, was the grandson of Sir Henry.

Dudley became a major landowner in County Carlow; he was the ancestor of the Bagenal family of Bagenalstown. He was killed in a skirmish with the local Kavanagh family.

Mabel eloped with Hugh O'Neill, 2nd Earl of Tyrone; she became one of the most romantic figures in Irish history, being described as "the Helen of Troy of the Elizabethan Wars". Mabel and her sister Mary Barnewall are major characters in the play Making History by Brian Friel; their father and brother Henry are frequently referred to but do not appear on stage.

Other daughters of Sir Nicholas are known:

Two daughters, Ursula and Jane Bagnall, are found in "A Family Tapestry" by Eva Plewman Appleton - a History of the Phepoe, Bagnall, Rothwell and Plewman families.

Margery Bagnall, who married firstly Sir Francis Roe and secondly George Downham, is also given as a base-born daughter of Sir Nicholas.

Henry's half-brother was Samuel Bagenal.
