= Battle of the Yellow Ford =

Part of the Nine Years' War in Ireland (1598)

- Part of the Nine Years' War
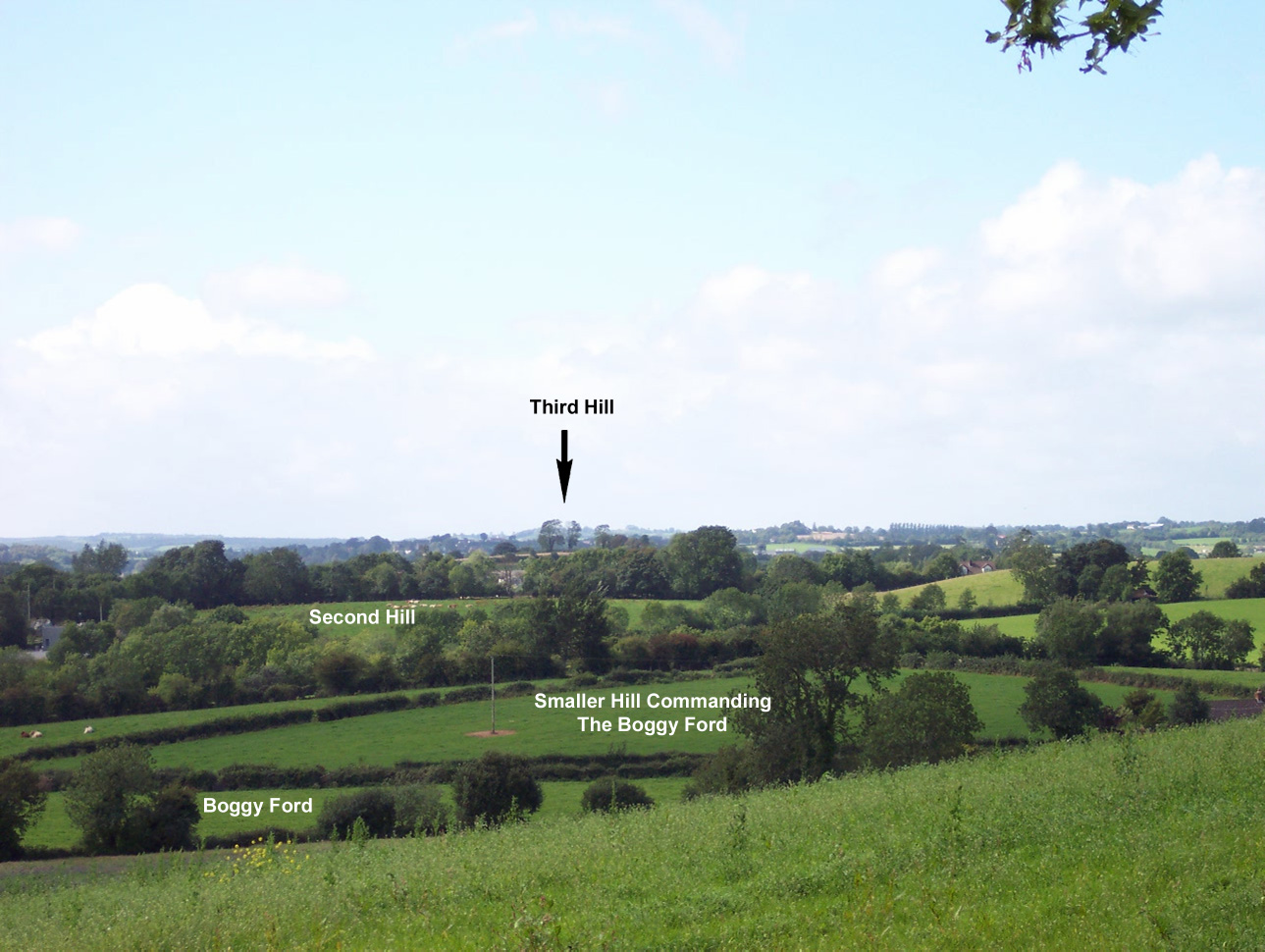
- View along the Yellow Ford battlefield looking north-west
Date	14 August 1598
Location	between Armagh and Blackwatertown, Ireland 54.401°N 6.686°W
Result	Irish victory

Belligerents
England: Loyalists	Irish alliance

Commanders and leaders
Henry Bagenal †; Calisthenes Brooke; Thomas Wingfield; Maelmora O'Reilly †	Hugh O'Neill; Hugh O'Donnell; Hugh Maguire

Strength
5,000	3,500–6,000

Casualties and losses
1,500 killed	Light

The Battle of the Yellow Ford was fought in County Armagh on 14 August 1598, during the Nine Years' War in Ireland. An English army of about 4,000, led by Henry Bagenal, was sent from the Pale to relieve the besieged Blackwater Fort. Marching from Armagh to the Blackwater, the column was routed by a Gaelic Irish army under Hugh O'Neill of Tyrone. O'Neill's forces divided the English column and a large earthwork stalled its advance. Bagenal was killed by an Irish musketeer, and scores of his men were killed and wounded when the English gunpowder wagon exploded. About 1,500 of the English army were killed and 300 deserted. After the battle, the Blackwater Fort surrendered to O'Neill. The battle marked an escalation in the war, as the English Crown greatly bolstered its military forces in Ireland, and many Irish lords who had been neutral joined O'Neill's alliance.

== Background ==
In 1597, the English Lord Deputy of Ireland, Thomas Burgh, built a new fort on the river Blackwater five miles northwest of the English government's garrison town Armagh. Soon after it was built, Hugh O'Neill, Earl of Tyrone, laid siege to it. In 1598, with the besieged garrison running low on supplies, the English government debated whether to abandon the fort, as it was too far into O'Neill's home territory to be sustainable. It was six and a half miles from the O'Neill stronghold of Dungannon. Sir Henry Bagenal argued the fort should be re-supplied, and in early August 1598 was appointed to lead the expedition.

According to the Annals of the Four Masters: "When O'Neill had received intelligence that this great army was approaching him, he sent his messengers to O'Donnell, requesting of him to come to his assistance against this overwhelming force of foreigners who were coming to his country. O'Donnell proceeded immediately, with all his warriors, both infantry and cavalry, and a strong body of forces from Connacht, to assist his ally against those who were marching upon him. The Irish of all the province of Ulster also joined the same army, so that they were all prepared to meet the English before they arrived at Armagh".

Bagenal's army marched from Dublin to Armagh. Meanwhile, O'Neill's troops had dug trenches in the countryside between Armagh and the Blackwater fort, blocked the roads with felled trees, and set up brushwood breastworks. The countryside was hilly with drumlins and was made up of woodland, bog and some fields. In Armagh, Bagenal was aware that the five miles to the besieged fort was laced with ambush positions, but believed his army could handle the hit-and-run tactics and that he would win any pitched battle. With the main road blocked, Bagenal chose to march along a series of low hills and cross the River Callan.

=== Opposing forces ===
Bagenal was the English army commander in chief (marshal) of Ulster for a decade (beginning in 1587 as his father's deputy), gaining extensive experience fighting against the Maguires and other Irish lords. He had a bitter grudge against O'Neill, who some years earlier had eloped with his sister Mabel. He was familiar with the territory. He commanded 3,500 footsoldiers. Bagenal's footsoldiers were armed with the standard weapons of the day: pikes and muskets. Standard formation when marching through hostile territory was musketeers in outside columns, able to fire out, and pikemen on the inside able to relieve the musketeers in the event of a sustained charge against the column. Bagenal also had 350 cavalry and several pieces of artillery. The cavalry were commanded by Sir Calithenese Brooke. A troop of cavalry was commanded by Maelmora O'Reilly, who was deemed to be lord of East Breifne by Queen Elizabeth I. This was not recognised within the East Breifne and Maelmora had no authority there as it had risen up in rebellion. Maelmora was the eldest son of Sir John O'Reilly, Lord of East Breifne, who had died fighting against the English in 1596. Maelmora was slain in the battle of the Yellow Ford.

The strength of O'Neill's army is estimated to have been 5,000. O'Neill's army was unlike earlier Irish armies, as possibly 80% of his men were armed with calivers, which was a lighter and more portable version of the musket. These were supported by pikemen, and targeteers; Gaelic soldiers with sword and buckler who'd been trained by Spanish advisors, gave close protection to Tyrone's skirmishers. O'Neill had several English and Spanish military advisors in his pay, as well as many Irish officers with experience in mainland Europe, who trained his troops in the use of modern weaponry. However, his army was not the same as the pike and shot deployed by the English. O'Neill developed a hybrid army which maximised his infantry's firepower while maintaining the key Irish advantage of mobility. The earl had less success modernising his cavalry, who carried their spears over-arm, either thrusting or throwing them at close quarters in the traditional way.

== The battle ==
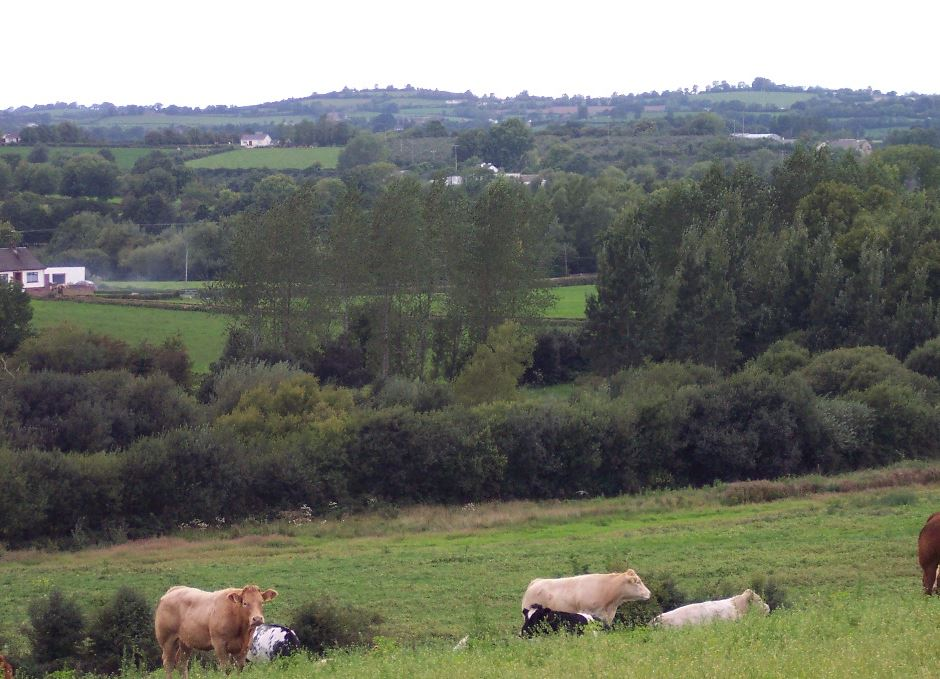
Last vestiges of the scrub woodland which flanked the Yellow Ford battlefield

The English Crown army was made up of six regiments—two forward, two centre, and two rear, and with cavalry at centre. As soon as it left Armagh, it was harried with gunfire from Irish troops hidden in scrubland on both flanks of the column. While fire poured in from the sides, no resistance was met at the head of the column as it crossed the River Callan. As the lead regiment pressed on, led by Sir Richard Percy, dangerous gaps began to separate the English infantry. It was later remarked that the leading English troops marched as if they had "won the goal in a match at football". As Percy pushed further he crossed a boggy ford, the 'Yellow Ford' from which the battle takes its name. It was an area of raised ground allowing access across the bog to the hills ahead. Bagenal's following regiment lagged behind, burdened with supplies and artillery, one of which was a saker (a cannon weighing 2,500–3,000 pounds) drawn by oxen. It was getting bogged down "every ten score end" and eventually got stuck and was abandoned.

Percy's regiment climbed a second hill (Drumcullen), where he found a mile-long earthen trench and bank cutting across their line of advance. The trench was five-foot deep, the bank five-foot high and crested with thorns. Harried by gunfire from his flanks, Percy took his regiment down the hill and over the blockade, led by the forlorn hope under captains Turner and Leigh. The trench was not defended and O'Neill made no effort to stop them. Reaching the top of the third hill (Mullyleggan), Percy could see the Blackwater Fort. The beleaguered garrison could see their relief and threw their caps in the air "hoping to have a better supper than the dinner they had that day". But their hopes were stillborn.

The rear English regiments under Captains Cuney and Billing had been halted crossing the River Callan and the rest of the English army had stalled on Drumcullen hill. O'Neill sent more troops to attack Percy's men, forcing the English musketeers to withdraw into their pike stand. This allowed O'Neill's shot to rake the compact body of troops with close-range gunfire, and his horse and swordsmen started to open gaps in the pike defence. Under severe pressure, Bagenal ordered Percy to retreat back over the trench, but this could not be done in an orderly way and the lead English regiment was routed. The trench had cut off Percy's men from their cavalry. Moreover, it hindered the English infantry's retreat as "falling over one another they filled the dyke and were trodden down where they fell". Marshal Bagenal led his men forward to help the shattered infantry, but as he descended the hill towards the trench he was shot through the head and killed. The English counter-attack continued but it was badly mauled by O'Neill, sending them spilling back over the trench.

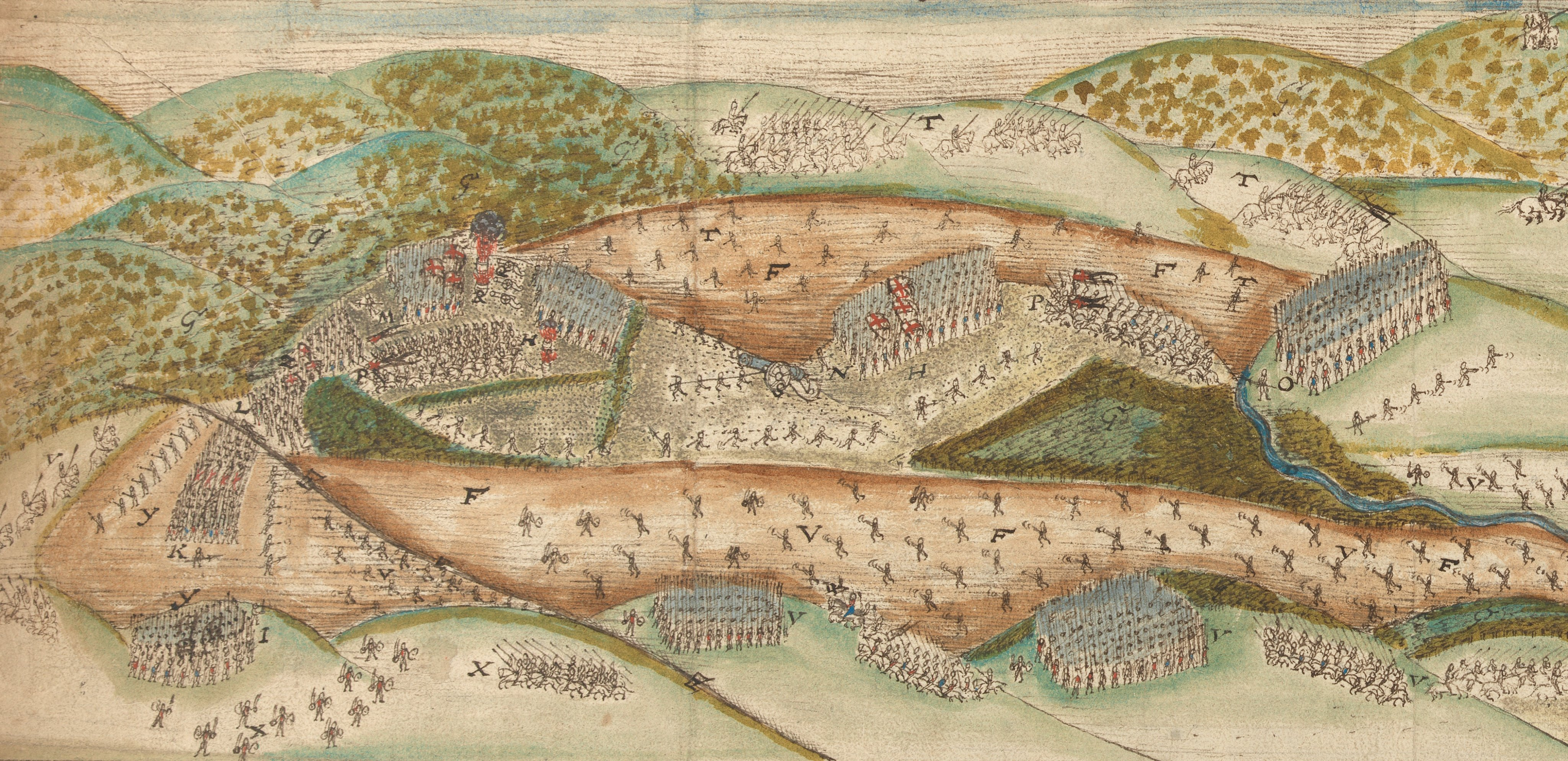
Illustration of the Battle of the Yellow Ford

Thomas Maria Wingfield took over command of the English army. Matters went from bad to worse, as an English soldier attempted to refill his supply of gunpowder straight from the powder store in the supply train. Thrusting his hand into the powder, he still had his lit match from his firearm. Two to four hundred pounds of gunpowder exploded in the English central position, killing and wounding scores and shrouding the hill in a thick cloud of smoke. This disaster within the English ranks only encouraged the Irish to redouble their attacks. With little option, Wingfield ordered a retreat to Armagh. But the commander of the English rear either did not get the command or refused to obey it, or was unable to make an orderly retreat and instead launched a foolhardy second counterattack across the trench. O'Neill quickly crushed Cosby's attack. Only quick action by Wingfield and the English horse saved 500 men from the slaughter, but Cosby was taken prisoner by O'Neill's men.

The rest of the English Crown forces struggled back to Armagh. The Irish moved to cut off the English retreat at the River Callan, but point-blank fire from the English column's remaining cannon halted the Irish advance. Finally, the shattered English force caught a break, as Irish fire slackened. The Irish shot had exhausted their immediate supply of gunpowder. Captain Cuney later noted that if O'Neill's pike had come on as his shot, none of his men would have survived. After recrossing the River Callan, the English army returned to Armagh.

== Aftermath ==
About 1,500 of the English Crown forces were killed. This included 18 "captains" or officers killed. Three hundred soldiers deserted to the Irish alliance, including two Englishmen. Out of 4,000 soldiers who had set out from Armagh, just over 2,000 returned after the battle. Those who did reach Armagh were besieged. The English cavalry broke out and rode south, escaping the Irish. After three days of negotiation, it was agreed that the English Crown troops could leave Armagh as long as they left their arms and ammunition behind and that the garrison of the Blackwater Fort surrendered. The most badly wounded English soldiers were left in Armagh Cathedral, many with severe burns suffered in the gunpowder explosion, but O'Neill agreed to tend to them and have them transported to Newry when they were fit to travel.

According to the English, 200 to 300 of O'Neill's army were killed, though that is likely to be an overestimate to mitigate the scale of the disaster.

After the battle, the English Crown swiftly and greatly bolstered its military forces in Ireland. Many Irish lords who had been neutral undertook to join O'Neill's alliance. Thus, the overall outcome of the battle was an escalation of the war.

== See also ==
- Siege of Kinsale
- Gallowglass
- Tudor conquest of Ireland
- Battle of Glenmalure

== Sources ==
- Hayes-McCoy, Gerard Anthony (1990) [1st pub. 1969]. Irish Battles: A Military History of Ireland. Belfast: The Appletree Press. ISBN 0-86281-250-X.
- O'Neill, James (January 2013). "The cockpit of Ulster: war along the River Blackwater 1593–1603". The Ulster Journal of Archaeology. 72: 184–199.
- O'Neill, James (2017). The Nine Years War, 1593-1603: O'Neill, Mountjoy and the Military Revolution. Dublin: Four Courts Press. ISBN 978-1-84682-754-9.
- James O'Neill, 'Like sheep to the shambles? Slaughter and surrender during Tyrone's Rebellion 1593–1603', Irish Sword, vol. 31, no. 126 (2018), pp 366–80.
- John McCavitt, The Flight of the Earls, Dublin 2002.
- John McGurk, 'The Battle of the Yellow Ford, August 1598', Dúiche Néill: Journal of the O'Neill Country Historical Society, no. 11 (1997), pp 34–55.
