= Making History (play) =

1988 play by Brian Friel

- Script cover
- Written by: Brian Friel
- Characters: Hugh O'Neill, Earl of Tyrone; Mabel Bagenal; Harry Hoveden; Hugh Roe O'Donnell; Mary Bagenal; Peter Lombard
- Original language: English
- Subject: Irish nationalism, Nine Years' War, historiography
- Genre: History play
- Setting: Dungannon, Sperrin Mountains and Rome, 1590s

Premiere
- Date premiered: September 20, 1988
- Place premiered: Guildhall, Derry

Making History is a 1988 play written by Irish playwright Brian Friel, which premiered at the Guildhall, Derry on 20 September 1988. It focuses on the life and legacy of Hugh O'Neill, Earl of Tyrone, who led a combined Irish-Spanish alliance against the English during the Nine Years' War. The play is set before and after the Battle of Kinsale. The battle does not directly feature in the play, although it is central to the plot.

The play's other main theme is O'Neill's unexpected third marriage to the much younger Anglo-Irish Protestant Mabel Bagenal, daughter and sister of two of his most implacable enemies, which the play presents as a genuine though ill-fated love marriage.

== Characters ==
| Character | Original production | Ref. |
|---|---|---|
| Hugh O'Neill | Stephen Rea | |
| Harry Hovenden | Niall O'Brien | |
| Hugh O'Donnell | Peter Gowen | |
| Archbishop Lombard | Niall Tóibín | |
| Mabel Bagenal | Clare Holman | |
| Mary Bagenal | Emma Dewhurst | |
