= Sarsfield =

Sarsfield is a surname of Norman origin that may refer to:

== People with the surname ==
- Aurelia Vélez Sársfield (1836–1924), Argentine writer
- Catalina Sarsfield (18th century), Franco-Irish Jacobite and wife of Theodore of Corsica
- Dalmacio Vélez Sársfield (1800–1875), Argentine leader
- David Sarsfield (died 1710), Irish Jacobite
- Emily Sarsfield (born 1983), English freestyle skier
- Eugene S. Sarsfield (1902–1943), US Navy
- Francis Sarsfield (17th century), Irish lawyer of the 17th century
- James Sarsfield, 2nd Earl of Lucan (1693-1718), Franco-Irish Jacobite
- Mairuth Sarsfield (1925–2013), author
- Patrick Sarsfield, 1st Earl of Lucan (c. 1660–1693), Irish Jacobite leader
- Pedro Sarsfield (died 1837), Spanish general of the Peninsular War and First Carlist War
- Peter Sarsfield (17th century), Irish landowner
- William Sarsfield (16th century), Irish public official
- William Sarsfield (died 1675), Irish landowner

== Places ==
- Vélez Sársfield (barrio), Buenos Aires
- Sarsfield Barracks, Limerick City, Ireland
- Sarsfield, Ontario, Canada
- Sarsfield, East Gippsland, County of Dargo, Victoria, Australia

== Sports clubs ==
=== GAA in Ireland ===
Gaelic Athletic Associations in the island of Ireland named after Patrick Sarsfield, 1st Earl of Lucan:

- High Moss Sarsfields GFC, County Armagh
- Sarsfields GAA (Cork)
- Ballerin GAC, County Derry
- Lucan Sarsfields GAA, County Dublin
- Sarsfields GAA (County Galway)
- Sarsfields GAA (Newbridge), County Kildare
- Thurles Sarsfields GAA, County Tipperary
- Patrick Sarsfields GAA, Belfast (Antrim)

=== Soccer ===
- Club Atlético Vélez Sarsfield, Buenos Aires, Argentina

== Other ==
- USS Sarsfield (DD-837), named after Eugene S. Sarsfield
- Viscount Sarsfield, a title
