= Patrick Sarsfield (Irish confederate) =

Irish landowner and soldier

- Born: County Kildare, Kingdom of Ireland
- Occupations: Landowner politician soldier
- Spouse: Anne O'Moore
- Children: William Sarsfield; Patrick Sarsfield, 1st Earl of Lucan; Anne, Viscountess Sarsfield

Patrick Sarsfield was an Irish landowner and soldier of the seventeenth century noted for his role in the Irish Confederate Wars. He is best known as the father of Patrick Sarsfield, 1st Earl of Lucan, and is sometimes referred to as Patrick Sarsfield the Elder because of this.

== Background ==
He came from a long-established Old English family from The Pale. His great-grandfather Sir William Sarsfield had been Mayor of Dublin and was knighted for his service against the rebellion of Shane O'Neill in 1566. He acquired two estates at Lucan Manor and Tully Castle in County Kildare, dividing the properties between two of his sons on his death. Patrick's grandfather, the younger son, received Tully Castle.

Patrick's father was Peter Sarsfield. His mother Eleanor Dempsey, was the daughter of the Gaelic lord Terence O'Dempsey, 1st Viscount Clanmalier. Like the majority of the traditional Anglo-Irish population, he was raised as a Roman Catholic, as opposed to more recent arrivals who were generally Protestant. He inherited Tully Castle from his father.

== Confederate Wars ==
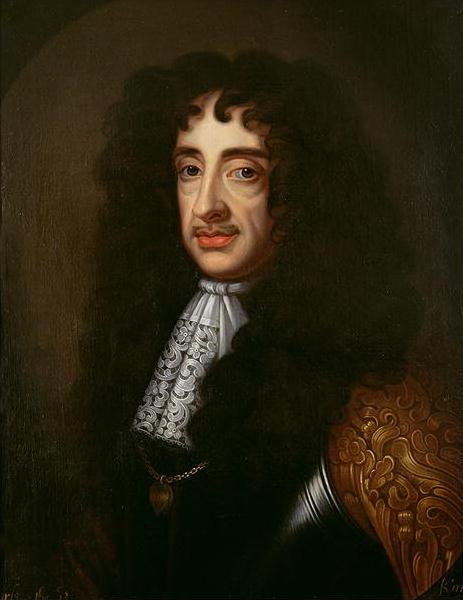
Sarsfield received support from Charles II after his son William married a woman who was possibly the King's illegitimate daughter.

In 1641 a major rebellion broke out in Ireland. The Catholic inhabitants, while proclaiming their loyalty to King Charles I, rose up against the Parliament of England and its allies in the Irish government in Dublin. The rebellion spread across Ireland, drawing in both the Gaelic Irish and Anglo-Irish Catholics. In response to some massacres of Protestants, forces of Scottish and English troops were raised and arrived to support the Irish Protestants. The following war lasted for more than a decade.

Sarsfield, whose family were traditionally loyal to the Dublin authorities, was amongst those who felt pushed towards rebellion. As a punishment he was expelled in June 1642 from the Parliament of Ireland (where he sat for Kildare Borough) and was attainted for high treason. Sarsfield was a supporter of the Moderate Faction of the Irish Confederacy which was established by the rebels, favouring a quick agreement with Charles I and his Irish Royalists so as to join forces against their common enemies. Following the execution of Charles I, a treaty of alliance was agreed upon. In the ensuing campaign, Sarsfield assisted Royalist forces in the unsuccessful Siege of Dublin (1649). Charles II was later to commend him for his conduct at the time.

Following the Cromwellian conquest of Ireland, Sarsfield was deemed guilty for his part in the rebellion and the massacres that had followed. Along with other Catholic leaders he was part of the Transplantation to Connaught. For Sarsfield, this meant the loss of both Tully Castle and Lucan Manor which he had recently inherited from his childless cousin. His estates came respectively into the possession of David Hutchinson, a merchant and alderman from Dublin, and Sir Theophilus Jones. Sarsfield was partially compensated with new lands in western Ireland which were of much lesser value.

== Restoration ==
Following Charles II's Restoration, the Sarsfields attempt to have their former lands restored to them. However, the Court of Claims found that Patrick Sarsfield's role in the 1641 rebellion disbarred him from pardon. After he secured support from influential figures such as Maurice Eustace and the Duke of Ormonde, the King agreed to restore Tully Castle to him.

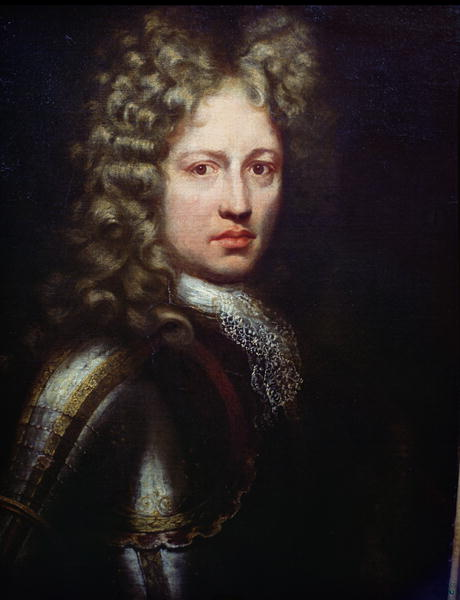
Sarsfield's youngest son the Jacobite leader Patrick Sarsfield, 1st Earl of Lucan.

Theophilus Jones, who remained an influential figure and an officer in the Irish Army, refused to give up his ownership of Lucan Manor. Still, the Sarsfields continued to press their claims to it. Their case was boosted following the marriage of William Sarsfield to Mary Crofts. She was the daughter of Lucy Walter, the first mistress of Charles II, who was the mother of Charles's eldest illegitimate son Duke of Monmouth. Mary was possibly also a daughter of Charles, although Theobald Taaffe, 1st Earl of Carlingford may be an alternative candidate. The King now intervened on the Sarsfield's behalf, awarding Jones a property of equal value in order that he should hand over Lucan Manor to William Sarsfield. Because of his role in the 1641 rebellion, Patrick remained legally barred from owning the property, but his son was not.

He died sometime after 1693, outliving both of his sons.

== Family ==
He married Anne O'Moore the daughter of Rory O'Moore, one of the principal leaders of the 1641 Rebellion. His eldest son was William Sarsfield, husband of Mary Scott, who died from smallpox in 1675. His better-known younger son Patrick was the Jacobite leader during the Williamite War in Ireland. He was made Earl of Lucan by James II in reward for his services, particularly at the 1690 Siege of Limerick when he led a raid on the Williamite artillery train. A daughter Anne married her distant cousin Dominick Sarsfield, 4th Viscount Sarsfield.

Following the death of his son William, Patrick senior was briefly made guardian of his grandson Charles Sarsfield, whose mother maintained that he was also the grandchild of King Charles. The family's estates eventually passed down through Charles' sister Charlotte Sarsfield to later generations. Charlotte married Agmondisham Vesey and their daughter Anne married Sir John Bingham, 5th Baronet, whose son became the 1st Earl of Lucan. All other Earls of Lucan descent from Charles and all Earls Spencer since the 3rd do as well through his daughter Livinia. By virtue of Rosalind Bingham this also applies to the last two Dukes of Abercorn. Princess Diana's father was the 8th Earl Spencer and Rosalind was his maternal grandmother. Therefore Patrick Sarsfield is a double ancestor of Princes William and Harry and their children.

== Bibliography ==
- Wauchope, Piers. Patrick Sarsfield and the Williamite War. Irish Academic Press, 1992.
