= Theodore I =

Theodore I may refer to:

- Patriarch Theodore I of Alexandria, Greek Patriarch of Alexandria (607–609)
- Pope Theodore I (died 649)
- Theodore I Calliopas, Exarch of Ravenna (643–645 and 653 – c. 666)
- Patriarch Theodore I of Constantinople (ruled 677–679)
- Theodore I Laskaris, Emperor of Nicaea (1204–1221 or 1205–1222)
- Teodor I Muzaka, Albanian despot
- Theodore I Palaiologos, Despot of the Morea in 1383-1407
- Tewodros I of Ethiopia, Emperor of Ethiopia (1413–1414), sometimes known as Theodore I
- Feodor I of Russia, Tsar of Russia, 1584–1598
- Theodore I of Corsica, King of Corsica (1736)
