= Dominick Sarsfield =

Dominick Sarsfield may refer to:

- Dominick Sarsfield, 1st Viscount Sarsfield (c. 1570–1636), Irish peer and judge
- Dominick Sarsfield, 4th Viscount Sarsfield (died 1701), Irish aristocrat
