= James Charles (disambiguation) =

James Charles (born 1999) is an American YouTuber and makeup artist.

James or Jimmy Charles may also refer to:

- James Charles (painter) (1851–1907), British impressionist artist
- James Charles (footballer) (1851–1939), Australian footballer, Richmond Football Club administrator
- Sir James Charles (sea captain) (1865–1928), British ocean-liner captain
- Jimmy Charles (singer) (born 1942), American singer
- Jimmy Charles (politician) (born 1960), American politician from Florida

== See also ==
- Charles James (disambiguation)
