= Charles James =

Charles, Charlie, or Chuck James may refer to:

== Arts and entertainment ==
- Charles James (designer) (1906–1978), English-American fashion designer
- Charlie Hamilton James (born 1973), English photographer and television presenter
- Captain James (Charles James), British television drama character

== Law and politics ==
- Charles Tillinghast James (1805–1862), U.S. senator
- Charles James (MP) (1817–1890), British politician
- Charles Pinckney James (1818–1899), U.S. federal judge
- Charles James (attorney) (born 1954), U.S. assistant attorney general
- Charles E. James Sr., U.S. government official

== Sports ==
- Charlie James (footballer) (1874–1948), Australian rules footballer
- Charles James (footballer) (1882–1960), English footballer
- Charles James (cricketer) (1885–1950), English cricketer
- Charles James (rugby league) (1891–1917), New Zealand rugby league footballer
- Charlie James (baseball) (born 1937), American baseball player
- Chuck James (born 1981), American baseball player
- Charles James (American football) (born 1990), American football cornerback

== Others ==
- Charles James (British Army officer) (1757/8–1821), English army officer and writer
- Charles James (chemist) (1880–1928), English-American chemist
- Charles C. James (1882–1957), American accountant
- Charles Holloway James (1893–1953), English architect
