= William Sarsfield (died 1675) =

Irish landowner

William Sarsfield was an Irish landowner of the seventeenth century. He was the elder brother of the Jacobite soldier Patrick Sarsfield.

He was of both Gaelic (he was a grandson of Rory O'Moore) and Old English descent. The Sarsfields had come to Ireland during the Norman conquest of the twelfth century and had become leading figures of The Pale. His great, great-grandfather Sir William Sarsfield served as Mayor of Dublin and purchased an estate at Lucan Manor. Like most of the Old English community, the Sarsfield remained Roman Catholic. His father Patrick Sarsfield senior took part in the Irish Rebellion of 1641, but like other Irish Confederates continued to swear allegiance to Charles I. He assisted royal forces against the English republicans during the Cromwellian conquest of Ireland, and lost his estates as a consequence.

After the Restoration, the family sought to have its former lands recovered. Although Patrick Sarsfield was found guilty by the court of claims in involvement in the 1641 rebellion, this did not alter his sons’ rights of inheritance. As his father’s oldest son and heir, William Sarsfield took possession of the Tully Castle estate in County Kildare, and after an intervention from Charles II, to whom he was arguably a son-in-law, it was agreed that Sarsfield would inherit Lucan Manor on the death of its occupant, Theophilus Jones. In the event, Jones outlived Sarsfield by a decade.

Sarsfield married Mary Crofts, the daughter of Lucy Walter, a Welsh woman who had a youthful relationship with Charles II when he was living at the Hague. Charles was unmarried at the time, and claims were often made that a marriage ceremony had taken place, which led him to treat Lucy's children with particular care. Mary was the younger sister of James Scott, Duke of Monmouth, who also looked out for her after their mother died, but was more likely to have been a daughter of Theobald Taaffe. Sarsfield and Mary had three children, Charles, Charlotte and William (the first two were named after Charles II, who Mary maintained was their grandfather).

He died of smallpox in 1675. After his death, there was a considerable dispute about his will, as his widow suggested that the Sarsfield family had manipulated it in their favour. After many years of wrangling, Lucan Manor eventually passed down to his daughter Charlotte Sarsfield, wife of Agmondisham Vesey, whose grandson became Charles Bingham, 1st Earl of Lucan.

Charles' daughter Lavinia Bingham married George Spencer, the 2nd Earl Spencer, on 5 March 1781. A direct descendant of this marriage was Lady Diana Spencer, later Diana, Princess of Wales. As a result, following the death of Queen Elizabeth II on 8 September 2022, Sarsfield is a direct ancestor of the first seven members in the apparent line of succession to the British throne, starting with his eight times great grandson Prince William of Wales.

== Bibliography ==
- Wauchope, Piers. Patrick Sarsfield and the Williamite War. Irish Academic Press, 1992.
