= Agmondisham Vesey =

Agmondisham or Agmondesham Vesey may refer to:

- Agmondisham Vesey (1677–1739), Irish MP for Tuam
- Agmondisham Vesey (1708–1785), his son, Irish MP for Harristown and Kinsale
