= Francis Sarsfield =

Irish lawyer and landowner

Francis Sarsfield was an Irish lawyer and landowner of the seventeenth century.

He was one of the Sarsfields of The Pale, an Old English family who had long been settled in Ireland. He was the cousin of the soldier Patrick Sarsfield, and represented him during a lengthy ownership dispute over property including that of Lucan Manor in County Dublin. To finance his legal fees, Patrick sold Francis several of his other properties.

After Patrick was attainted by the Williamite Irish Parliament after serving in the Jacobite Irish Army, Francis successfully pointed out that several of the properties listed in fact belonged to him.

== Bibliography ==
- D'Alton, John. King James's Irish Army List.
- Wauchope, Piers. Patrick Sarsfield and the Williamite War. Irish Academic Press, 1992.
