= Theodore of Corsica =

German adventurer (1694–1756)

Theodore I
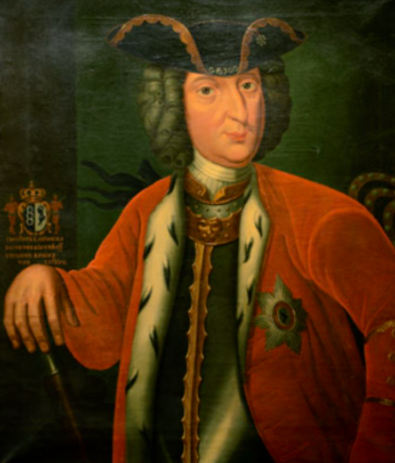

King of Corsica
- Reign: March 1736 – November 1736
- Successor: Colonel Frederick (titular)
- Born: 25 August 1694; Köln, Holy Roman Empire
- Died: 11 December 1756 (aged 62); London, Great Britain
- Burial: St Anne's Church, Soho, London
- Spouse: Catalina Sarsfield
- Issue: unnamed daughter; Colonel Frederick (claimed)

Theodore I of Corsica (Note: Corsican: Tiadoru I, French: Théodore I^{er}, Italian: Teodoro I.) (25 August 1694 – 11 December 1756), born Freiherr Theodor Stephan von Neuhoff, was a German adventurer who was briefly King of Corsica. Theodore is the subject of an opera by Giovanni Paisiello, Il re Teodoro in Venezia (1784, Vienna), and one of the six kings in Venice in Voltaire's Candide.

== Biography ==
Von Neuhoff was born in Cologne as the son of Westphalian nobleman Leopold Wilhelm Freiherr von Neuhoff zu Pungelscheid (d. 1695) and his wife, Amélie Collin. Educated at the court of France, he served first in the French army and then in that of Sweden. Georg Heinrich von Görtz, minister to Charles XII, realizing Neuhoff's capacity for intrigue, sent him to England, and to Spain to negotiate with Cardinal Alberoni. Having failed in this mission he returned to Sweden and then went to Spain, where he served Alberoni until his exile, then the Baron Ripperda, and was made colonel and married one of the queen's ladies-in-waiting. Deserting his wife soon afterwards he repaired to France and became mixed up in John Law's financial affairs and the Mississippi Company boom; then he led a wandering existence visiting Portugal, the Netherlands, and Italy.

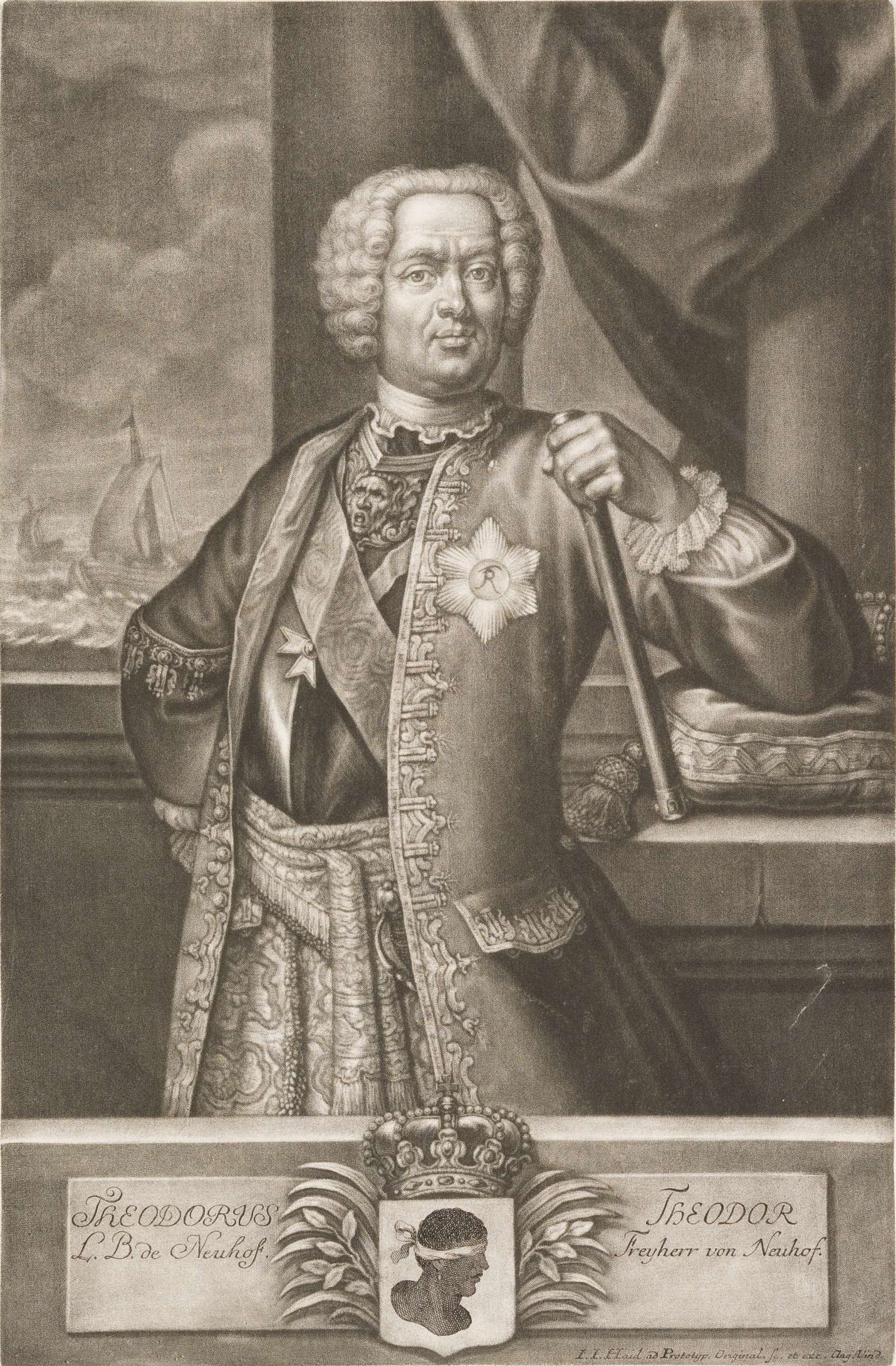
Theodor von Neuhoff (mezzotint by Schad c. 1740). Note use of Moor's head.

At Genoa, Neuhoff made the acquaintance of some Corsican rebels and exiles, and persuaded them that he could free their country from Genoese tyranny if they made him king of the island. With the help of the Bey of Tunis, he landed in Corsica in March 1736 with military aid. The islanders, whose campaign had not been successful, elected and crowned him king. He assumed the title of King Theodore I, issued edicts, instituted an order of knighthood, and waged war on the Genoese, at first with some success. But in-fighting among the rebels soon led to their defeat. The Genoese put a price on his head and published an account of his colourful past, and he left Corsica in November 1736, ostensibly to seek foreign assistance. After sounding out the possibility of protection from Spain and Naples, he set off to Holland where he was arrested for debt in Amsterdam.

On regaining his freedom, Theodore sent his nephew to Corsica with a supply of arms; he himself returned to Corsica in 1738, 1739, and 1743, but the combined Genoese and French forces continued to occupy the island. After that he fled to the Netherlands again and lived some years in exile in the manor house 't Velde near Zutphen. There he made plans for new actions to gain power again as king of Corsica. 1749 he arrived in England to seek support, but eventually fell into debt and was confined in a debtors' prison in London until 1755. He regained his freedom by declaring himself bankrupt, making over his kingdom of Corsica to his creditors, and subsisted on the charity of Horace Walpole and some other friends until his death in London in 1756, aged 62.

Theodore's wife Catalina Sarsfield was the daughter of David Sarsfield, younger brother of Dominick Sarsfield, 4th Viscount Sarsfield and his French wife, Marie d'Athboy. She is sometimes said to have been the daughter of Patrick Sarsfield, 1st Earl of Lucan and Lady Honora Burke, but was from a different branch of the Sarsfield family.

Theodore had one daughter, and Colonel Frederick, known as the Prince of Caprera, claimed to be his son. Frederick wrote an account of his purported father's life, Memoires pour servir a l'histoire de la Corse, and an English translation, both published in London in 1768. In 1795 he published an enlarged edition, A Description of Corsica, with an account of its union to the crown of Great Britain. See also Fitzgerald, King Theodore of Corsica (London, 1890).

== Epitaph ==
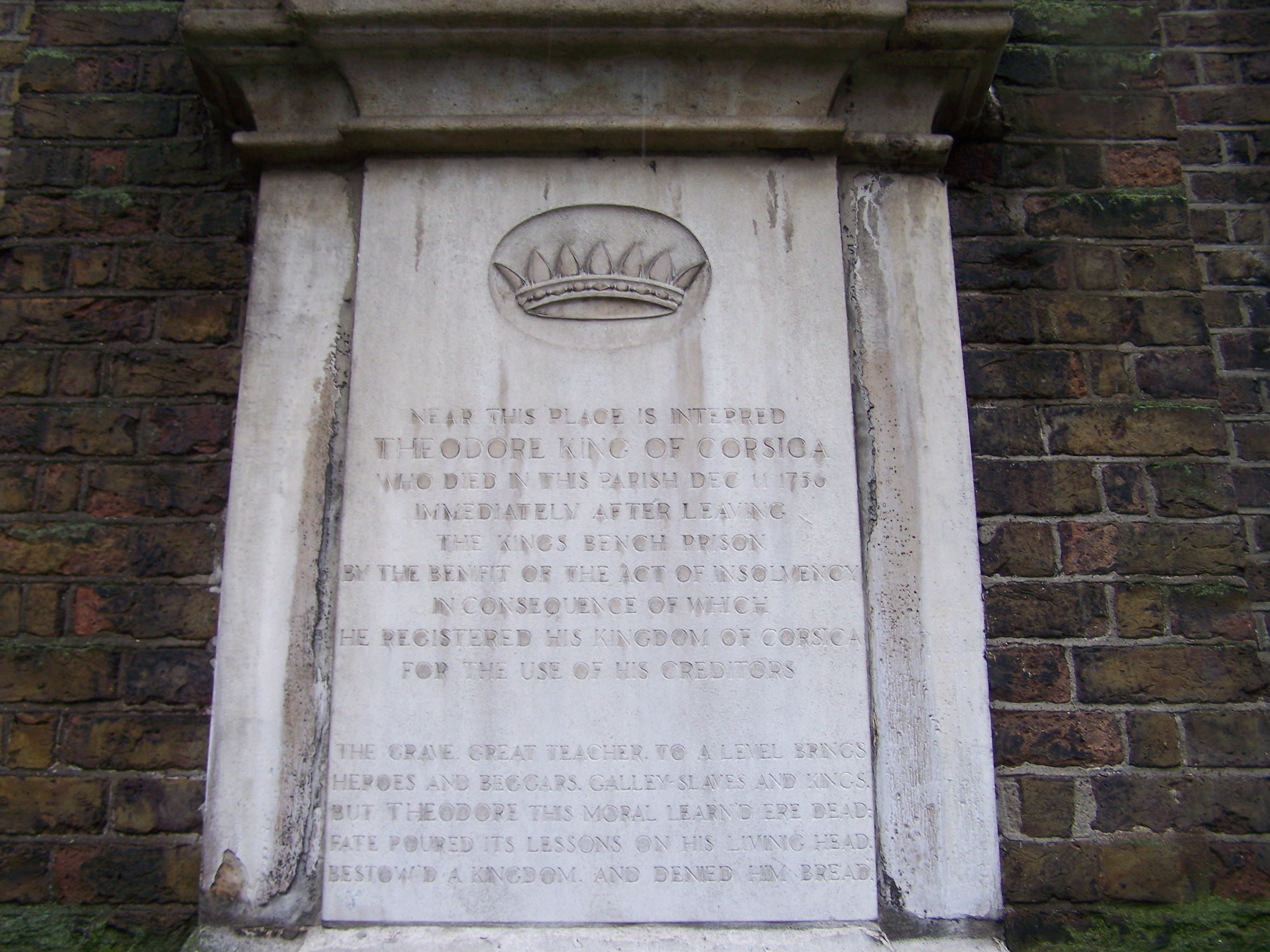
Neuhoff's gravestone

Neuhof was buried in the graveyard of St Anne's Church, Soho in central London. His epitaph was written by Horace Walpole, and can be seen on his gravestone:

The grave, great teacher, to a level brings
Heroes and beggars, galley slaves and kings.
But Theodore this moral learn'd ere dead:
Fate poured its lessons on his living head,
Bestow'd a kingdom, and denied him bread.

== Bibliography ==
- Bent, J. Theodore (1886). "King Theodore of Corsica", The English Historical Review, Vol. 1, No. 2, pp. 295–307.
- Fitzgerald, Percy (1890). King Theodore of Corsica. London: Vizetelly.
- Gasper, Julia (2012). Theodore von Neuhoff, King of Corsica: the Man Behind the Legend. University of Delaware Press.
- Graziani, Antoine-Marie (2005). Le Roi Théodore. Paris: Tallandier, coll. « Biographie ». 371 p., 22 cm. – ISBN 2-84734-203-6. (in French)
- Le Glay, André (1907), Théodore de Neuhoff, roi de Corse, Imprimerie de Monaco (French).
- Pirie, Valerie (1939). His Majesty of Corsica: The True Story of the Adventurous Life of Theodore 1st. London: William Collins & Sons.
- Vallance, Aylmer (1956). The Summer King: Variations by an Adventurer on an Eighteenth-Century Air. London: Thames & Hudson.
- Vergé-Franceschi, Michel (2005), Pascal Paoli : Un Corse des Lumieres, Paris, Fayard (French).
