= Catalina Sarsfield =

Queen consort of Corsica
- Reign: March 1736 - November 1736
- Born: 5 April 1697; Nantes, France
- Died: 1727 or after 1736
- Spouse: Theodore of Corsica
- Issue: Colonel Frederick (possibly)
- Father: David Sarsfield

Catalina Sarsfield (born 1697), also styled Catalina von Neuhoff, and briefly as Catalina of Corsica, was queen of Corsica by marriage to Theodore of Corsica, who ruled the short-lived Kingdom of Corsica in 1736.

== Biography ==
Catalina Sarsfield born in Nantes on 5 April 1697, the daughter of David Sarsfield and his French wife, Marie d'Athboy. She was niece of Dominick Sarsfield, 4th Viscount Sarsfield.

Both her father and uncle had supported James II during the Williamite War in Ireland and had then left Ireland for France as part of the Flight of the Wild Geese.

Part of the exiled Jacobite community, they served in Continental armies while hoping for the restoration of James II or his successors, which would lead to the recovery of their lost estates in County Limerick. David was killed fighting at the Battle of Villaviciosa in 1710. Catalina was the eldest of his six daughters, all of whom were born in Nantes. She was a lady in waiting to Queen Elisabeth of Spain. She married Theodore von Neuhoff in 1718. He struggled to satisfy Sarsfield's expensive tastes claiming she was "stubborn and bad-tempered".

In 1723, Catalina and her daughter followed her husband to Paris. She stayed in the court of Louise d’Orléans. Her daughter would later return to the Spanish court. The couple finally left the service of the Spanish Court around 1725 in unknown circumstances. After a visit to England and Paris with her husband, some sources state that Sarsfield died in Paris around 1727, although a dedication to her from a 1736 novel describes her as living in Paris with her daughter. Her husband abandoned her and her daughter, continuing to build up debt, and eventually serving as the King of Corsica for 6 months before dying in London following imprisonment in a debtors jail.

She is often mistakenly described as the daughter of the Jacobite hero Patrick Sarsfield and Honora Burke, who came from a distant branch of the Sarsfield family based in County Dublin. However, she was related to them by marriage. It is thought she might have kept her relationship with this part of the Sarsfield family ambiguous to protect her own interests.
