= David Sarsfield =

Irish soldier

David Sarsfield (1663–1710) was an Irish soldier noted for his service in the Jacobite Army during the Williamite War in Ireland. After going into exile as part of the Flight of the Wild Geese, he later served in the Spanish Army. He was killed at the Battle of Villaviciosa in 1710.

He was the son of David Sarsfield, 3rd Viscount Sarsfield and Elizabeth de Courcy, and the younger brother of Dominick Sarsfield, 4th Viscount Sarsfield, part of a prominent County Limerick family of Old English descent who had remained Roman Catholic. Both he and his elder brother served in the Irish Army of James II between 1689 and 1691. After the Treaty of Limerick ended the war, they went into exile in France. After first living in France, David Sarsfield subsequently went to Spain where he was made Governor of the strategic fortress of Badajoz.

He is said to have had eight children, two sons and six daughters, with his wife, Marie d'Athboy. His daughter Catalina Sarsfield married a German adventurer Theodore von Neuhoff, who later briefly ruled the Kingdom of Corsica. She is sometimes mistakenly said to be the daughter of the Jacobite hero Patrick Sarsfield, although he was only a distant cousin.

== Bibliography ==
- Gasper, Julia. Theodore Von Neuhoff, King of Corsica: The Man Behind the Legend. Rowman & Littlefield, 2013.
