= Ballincollig Castle =

Norman castle near Cork city, Ireland

- Ballincollig, County Cork, Ireland
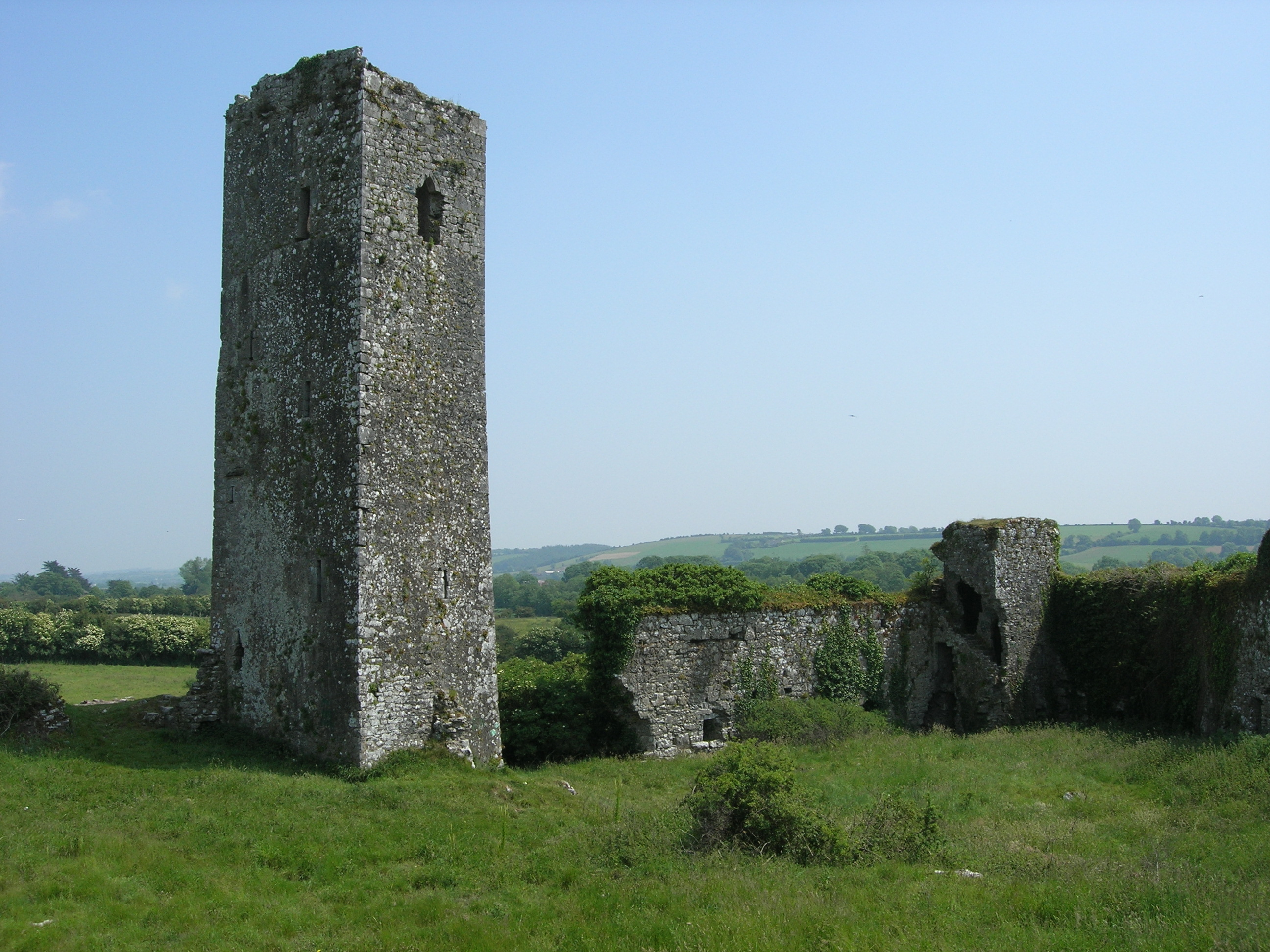
- Ballincollig Castle is located to the south of Ballincollig in Cork, Ireland

Site information
- Open to the public: No

Location
- Location within Ireland
- Coordinates: 51°52′45″N 8°35′58″W

Site history
- In use: At least 15th century to 17th century

Garrison information
- Designations: Protected structure (467)

Ballincollig Castle is a Norman castle to the south of the town of Ballincollig, County Cork, Ireland, built after the Norman invasion of Ireland. In its prime, the castle was inhabited by the Barrett family, who had control of the local area. The castle still stands today, albeit largely in ruin. The original keep still remains, as does most of the curtain wall and two towers.

== History ==
=== Background ===
An earlier castle may have been built on the site by Sir Robert Coll, a Norman knight, whose name also likely influenced the name of the town of Ballincollig (Baile an Choillaigh or the 'Town of the Colls'). While a date for this original construction is not confirmed, by 1468, the Barrett family purchased Coll's estate lands at Ballincollig, and improved and extended the castle site. The main structures of Ballincollig Castle were constructed at this time.

The bawn (enclosure) and tower house are located on a limestone summit, which has a line of sight over the low land of the Maglin Valley. Beneath the castle there is a natural cavern which runs into the rock, and around it the remains of a moat.

=== Barrett ownership ===
Members of the Barrett family had travelled from Normandy with William the Conqueror. Some of these Barretts travelled with the Normans to Ireland in 1169. When Henry II parceled out the spoils of conquest in Ireland, he gave the Kingdom of Cork (from Lismore, County Waterford to County Kerry) to Milo de Cogan. De Cogan (Goggin) received land west and south of the city, and the family built a number of castles on their lands. The Barretts were underlords of the de Cogans, and travelled to conquer Connacht in 1235 under John de Cogan. They, under John Barrett, subsequently become tenants of the de Cogans at Carrigrohane. By the 15th century, the Barretts were underlords of the MacCarthys, to whom they paid rent of £11 a year from 1420. They were later tenants of the Earls of Desmond, to whom they paid 12 marks yearly. By the late 1460s, the Barretts purchased Ballincollig Castle outright. This is recorded in the Carew Calendar of 28 November 1611, with Sir Dominic Sarsfield writing to Lord Carew: "Ballincollig is entailed and was purchased in the 8th year of Edward 4 (1468–9) from Robert Coil [Coll], a knight. Deed of entail in my own lands".

The castle became the principal Barrett stronghold until the early 17th century, when the Castlemore Barretts seem to have had control over Mourne Abbey and Garrycloyne (both in the north of the Barony), together with Castleinch, Ballincollig and Cloghan McUllick. The Barretts also controlled Carrigrohane for some time.

During the 1590s, a dispute arose. In July 1591, Andrew Barrett and sixty others assaulted Ballincollig Castle and dispossessed Edmund Barrett, "with swords, guns, great sledges or hammers, skenes, stones and staves". Three years later, Edmund got a decree of £100 against the Sheriff of County Cork, for refusing to execute a writ dispossessing Andrew Barrett and others who had seized the castle. In the following year, 1595, Edmund took his cousin to court. A fine of £20 was imposed on Andrew and lesser fines on two others, and they were jailed.

=== Castle lost ===
By the early 17th century, the Barretts had lost Ballincollig Castle. The family had borrowed money to pay for court fines and dowries, and obtained a mortgage on the castle and lands in 1618 from the Coppingers of Cork. Contemporary papers note that "William Barrett of Ballincollig in the County of Cork, gent,… in consideration of £240 paid by Edmond Coppinger Fitzrobert of Corke, gent, the said William Barrett granted to the said Edmond Coppinger, his heirs and assigns forever all that and those the castles, bawnes, towns, villages, hamlets, lands, tenements and hereditaments of and in Ballincolly…". This mortgage was transferred to Sir Walter Coppinger, Cloghane (near Skibbereen) and in 1630 for the payment of £790 to the Barretts, Coppinger came into full possession of the castle and lands.

By 1644, the castle was taken by Oliver Cromwell's forces, and around 1689 it was garrisoned for James II. After 1690, it fell into disuse and disrepair.

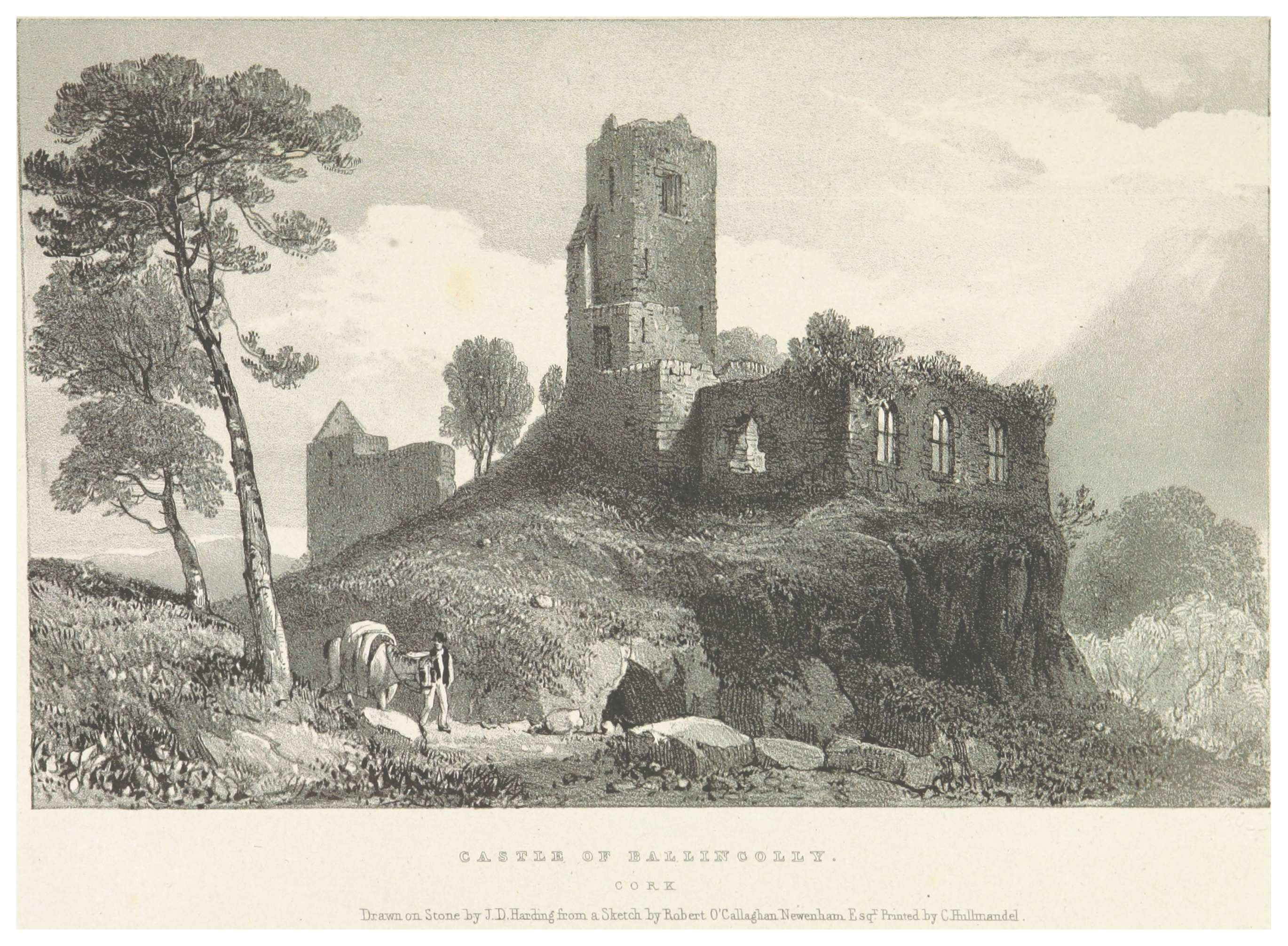
19th century engraving of the castle

=== Recent history ===
Standing disused and ruined for several centuries, the keep was repaired by the Wyse family in 1857. Today, the castle and its lands remain in private ownership. The main tower house at Ballincollig Castle is recorded in the Archaeological Survey of Ireland's Sites and Monuments Record (SMR) as entry 'CO073-062', with the bawn enclosure and cave recorded as SMR numbers 'CO073-062001' and 'CO073-062002', respectively.

== Features ==
=== Wall and enclosure ===
The castle consisted of a large walled enclosure (or bawn), with a tower or keep on one side of it and possibly a large hall through the middle. Most of the enclosing bawn or outer walls remain. These walls are about 5 feet (1.5 m) thick and 15 feet (5 m) high. The space on top was defended by a parapet with flights of steps leading up at several points. There were two defensive towers on the wall, one at present in ruins in the south-east corner and the second on the south wall.

The enclosure is between 70 and 100 feet (21 and 30 m) across and is rocky and uneven. There appears to be evidence of a hall in the middle, as one portion of the outer wall has the remains of a fireplace and chimney and a window of two lights. It is suggested that the towers on the outer wall and the hall are of 15th century making and were probably built after the castle was sold to the Barretts by Robert Coll.

=== Keep ===
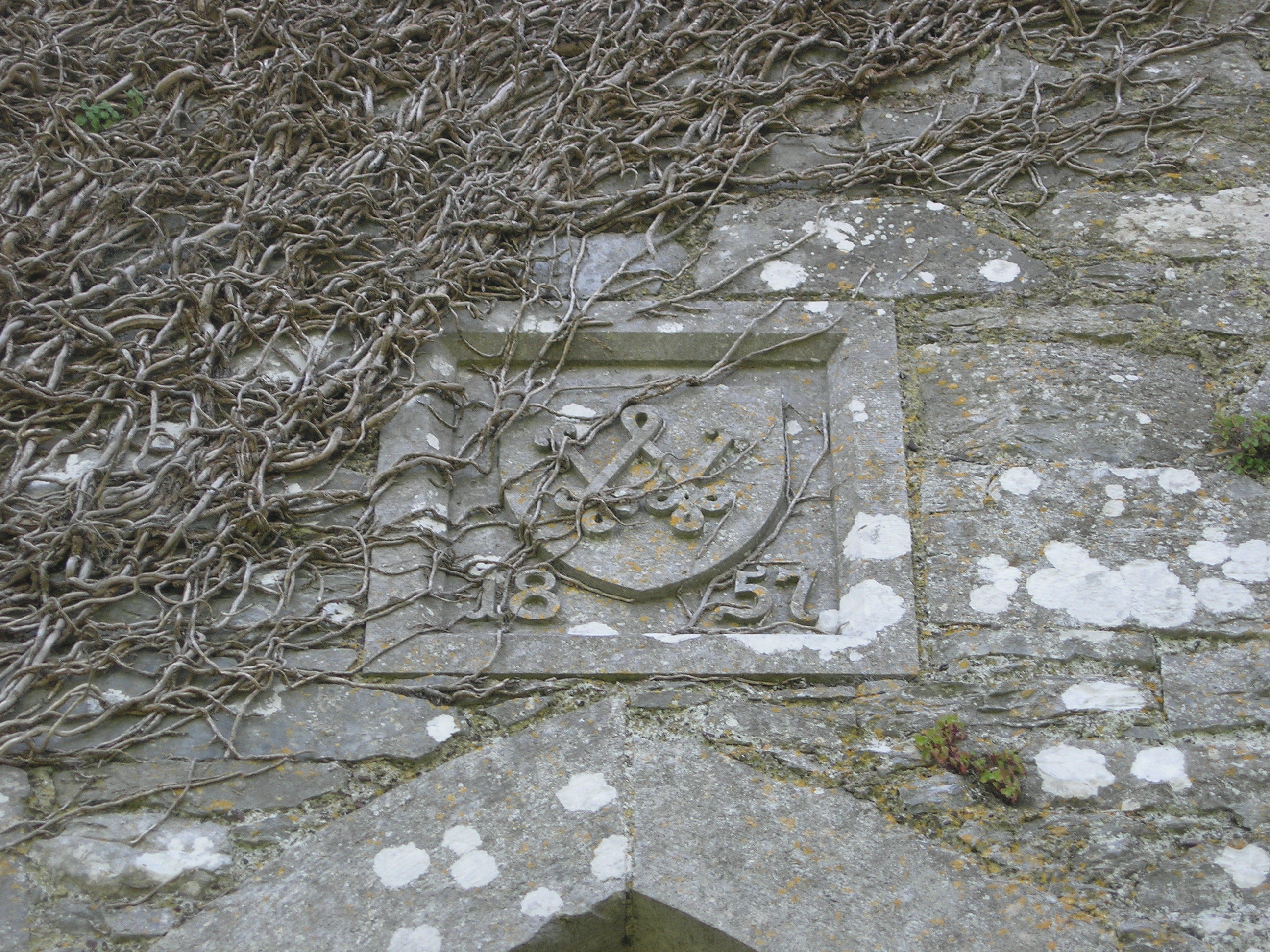
Monogram above tower entrance (added by the Wyse family in the 19th century)

The main tower or keep is of the 13th century and was likely used by Coll. Added-to by the Barretts, this keep was repaired by the Wyse family in 1857. During these renovations, a shield was inserted on the east wall. It bears the monogram 'W' and the date 1857 beneath it.

The keep is 45 to 50 feet (14 to 15 m) high. The ground floor is vaulted and originally had no entrance to it except by a trap door from above. The room on the first floor had a path up to it, carried on arches. It is about 7.5 by 9 feet (2.3 by 2.7 m). A very narrow staircase leads to other stories, all of which have stone floors on solid arches. To support them, the two walls on which they rest are thicker than the others. The second story has seats in the lambs of the loopholes, a drain from a garderobe (lavatory) and a small square cupboard in the wall over it. The upper floor and chief chamber seem to have had windows added on all sides in the middle of the 19th century. There are loopholes in other parts of the walls of the keep.
