= Charles James (British Army officer) =

English army officer and writer

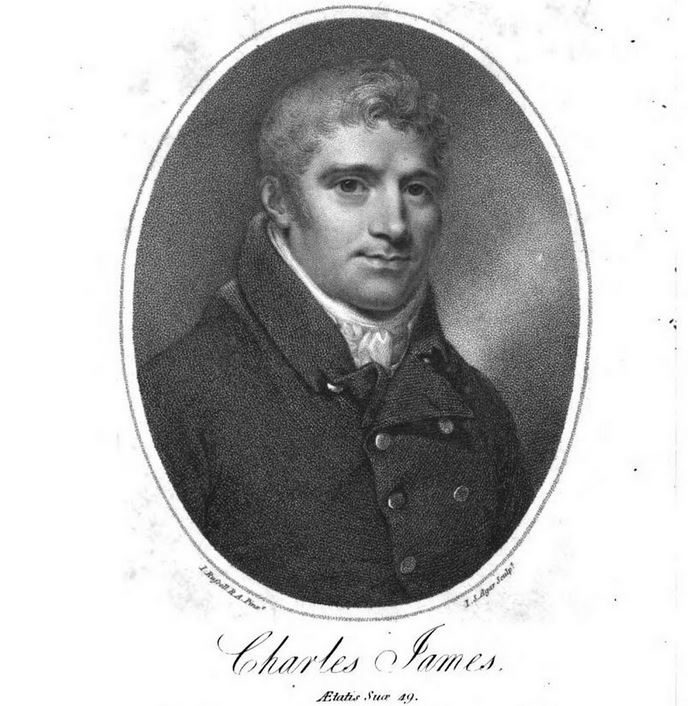
- Charles James, aged 49
- Born: 1757/8
- Died: 14 April 1821
- Military career
- Allegiance: Great Britain; United Kingdom
- Branch: British Army
- Service years: 1793–1812
- Rank: Major

Major Charles James (1757/8–1821) was an English army officer and miscellaneous writer.

== Life ==
Charles James was at Lisle at the outbreak of the French Revolution, and made a solitary journey through France during its progress, which he described in his Audi alteram Partem. He served as captain in the Western Regiment of Middlesex Militia (later the 2nd Royal Middlesex or Edmonton Militia) in 1793–4, and as captain in the North York Militia from 1795 to 1797. On 1 March 1806 he was appointed major of the Corps of Artillery Drivers attached to the Royal Artillery. He was placed on half-pay when that rank was abolished in 1812.

James afterwards lived at Gloucester Place, St. Marylebone, London. He died in London on 14 April 1821, aged sixty-three, and was buried at St. Mary's, Paddington Green, on 23 April.

== Works ==
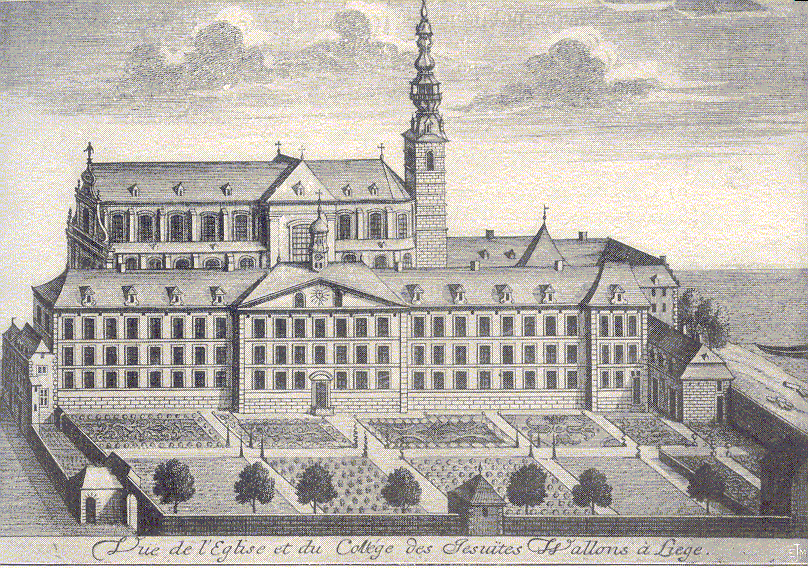
Collège en Isle, Liège (1740)

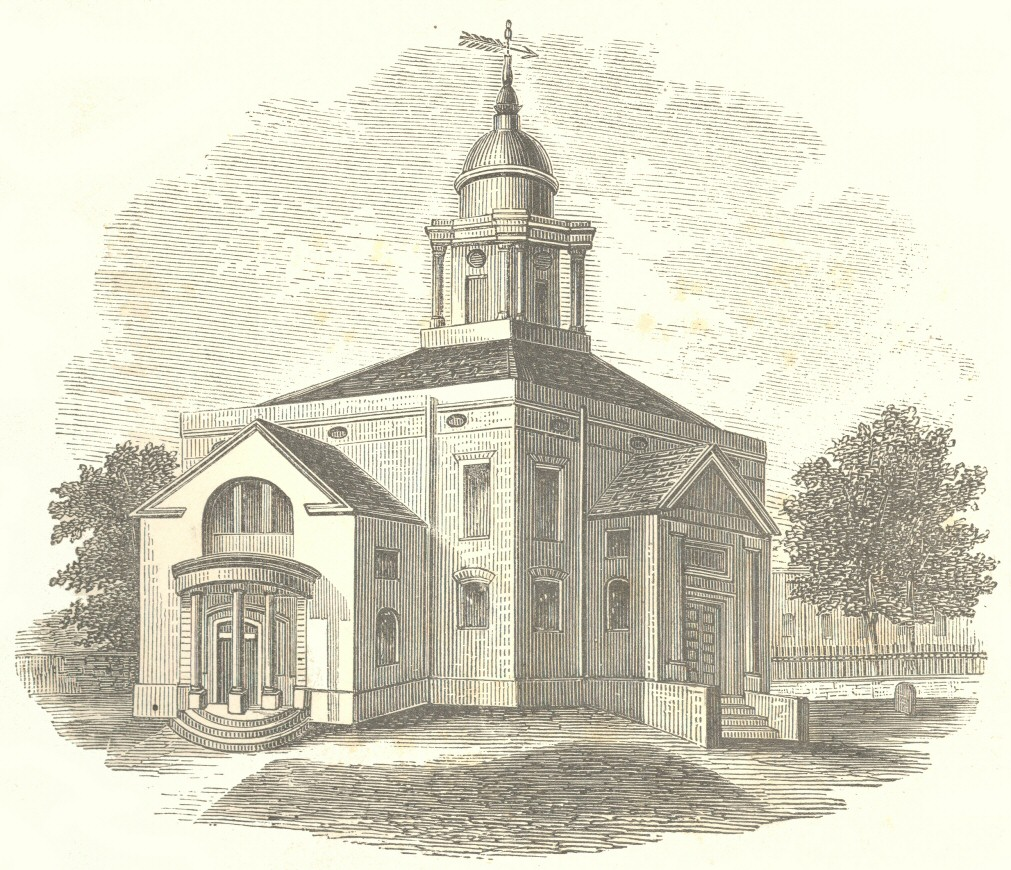
St. Mary's, Paddington Green (1853)

James was a very industrious writer, and his many works covered a wide variety of subjects. He was the author of:

1. Petrarch to Laura: a Poetical Epistle, London, 1787, 4to.
2. Tarere, an opera from the French of Beaumarchais, London, 1787, 8vo.
3. Poems, 2 vols., 1789, dedicated to the Prince of Wales, including pieces written at school in 1775, at Liège in 1776, and elsewhere.
4. Hints founded on Facts, or a View of our several Military Establishments, London, 1791, 8vo.
5. Suicide rejected: a Poem, 1791, 4to. A reprint dedicated to Lady James was issued in 1797, for the benefit of the daughter and grandchildren of Colonel Frederick. (Note: cf. British Critic, x.)
6. Poems, 1792, 8vo; 3rd edition 1808.
7. Audi alteram Partem: an Extenuation of the Conduct of the French Revolutionists from 14 July 1789 to 17 Jan. 1793, with Introduction and Postscript explanatory of the Author's reasons for the work, London, 1793, 8vo; a revised edition, 1796, and later.
8. Extenuation and Sketch of Abuses … with a Plan for the better regulation of the Militia, London, 1794, 8vo.
9. A Comprehensive View of Abuses in the Militia, London, 1797, 8vo.
10. Regimental Companion, containing a relation of the Duties of every Officer in the British Army, London, 1799, 12mo; a useful little manual of regimental economy, which went through seven or more editions.
11. New and enlarged Military Dictionary, with glossary of French terms, London, 1802, 4to; 1805, 8vo; 1811, 2 vols.; and 1817.
12. Military Costumes of India, being an Exemplification of the Manual and Platoon Exercise for the Use of the Native Troops and British Army, London, 1813, 4to.
13. Collection of Court-Martial Charges, London, 1820, 8vo, intended as a supplement to Tytler's Treatise on Military Law.

He also wrote volumes advocating the need to improve the regulation of the militia, and on the army's system of court-martial charges.
