= Peter Sarsfield =

Irish landowner

Peter Sarsfield was an Irish landowner of the seventeenth century.

He was from a wealthy Old English Catholic family from The Pale. His grandfather Sir William Sarsfield had served as Lord Mayor of Dublin, and had purchased Tully Castle in County Kildare which he passed on to his younger son, Peter's father, while the larger Lucan Manor went to the elder son.

Peter married Lady Eleanor O'Dempsey, the daughter of Lord Clanmalier a member of the Gaelic Irish nobility who had taken a title from the Crown as part of the surrender and regrant policy. Peter's eldest son and heir was Patrick Sarsfield, who took part in the Irish Confederate Wars. His grandson was Patrick Sarsfield, Earl of Lucan, a leading Jacobite figure of the Williamite War in Ireland.

== Bibliography ==
- Wauchope, Piers. Patrick Sarsfield and the Williamite War. Irish Academic Press, 1992.
