= Agmondisham Vesey (died 1739) =

Irish landowner and politician

Agmondisham Vesey (21 January 1677 – 24 March 1739) was an Irish landowner.

== Biography ==
He was the son of John Vesey by his second wife Anne, daughter of Colonel Agmondisham Muschamp. He was first elected to Parliament for Tuam in 1703 on the nomination of his father, the Archbishop of Tuam, and would continue to represent the seat until his death.

He married firstly, Charlotte, daughter of William Sarsfield and Mary Crofts, and an alleged granddaughter of Charles II and Lucy Walter. They had two daughters: Anne, who married Sir John Bingham, 5th Baronet, and Henrietta, who married Caesar Colclough.

Vesey's second wife was Jane, daughter of Captain Edward Pottinger and widow of John Reynolds and of Sir Thomas Butler, 3rd Baronet. By her he had further issue, including Agmondisham, also an MP; Letitia, who married Charles Meredyth, Dean of Ardfert; and Catherine, who married Anthony Jephson.

Vesey had residences at Molesworth Street, Dublin; Hollymount, County Mayo; Allenswood, County Kildare and Lucan, Dublin. He died at Lucan Manor in 1739.

He was succeeded by his son Agmondisham Vesey who inherited Lucan Manor.

The name Agmondisham originally comes from an archaic spelling of the town of Amersham in Surrey, England.
