= James Charles (footballer) =

English football club administrator (1851–1939)

James Charles (13 November 1851 – 20 December 1939) was one of the founding members of the Richmond Football Club.

He was Richmond's inaugural Club Secretary, serving in 1885 and 1886, at the same time as being the club's delegate to the Victorian Football Association. He then served on the Richmond Committee in 1887, 1888 and 1896.

He was made the first life member of the Richmond Football Club in 1895 and was posthumously inducted into the club's Hall of Fame in its inaugural year, 2002.
