= Sarsfield Barracks =

Barracks in Ireland

- Dún an tSáirséalaigh
- Limerick
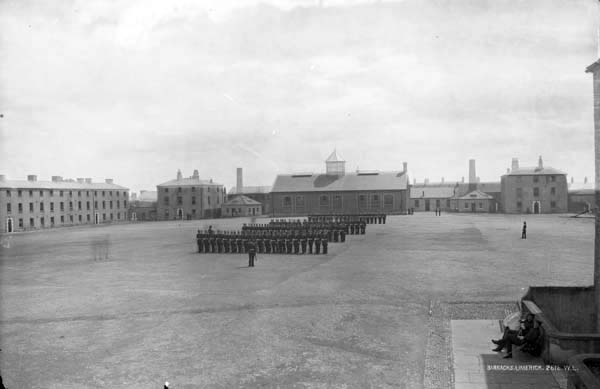
- Sarsfield Barracks circa 1880

Site information
- Type: Barracks
- Operator: (Republic of Ireland) Irish Army

Location
- Location within Ireland
- Coordinates: 52.65517°N 8.63183°W

Site history
- Built: 1795
- Built for: War Office
- In use: 1795-present

Garrison information
- Garrison: 12th Infantry battalion, Irish Army

Sarsfield Barracks (Irish: Dún an tSáirséalaigh) is an Irish Army Barracks in Limerick city. It houses both Permanent and Reserve Defence Forces of the Irish Defence Forces.

== History ==
The barracks, originally called New Barracks, were built on land leased from a Mr J.T. Monsell and were completed in 1795. The barracks were handed over to the Irish Army following Irish Independence and renamed Sarsfield Barracks after Patrick Sarsfield, a Jacobite, in 1926. The barracks remain in use and, as of 2025, are the headquarters of 12th Infantry battalion.

== See also ==
- List of Irish military installations
