= Dominick Sarsfield, 1st Viscount Sarsfield =

Irish peer and judge

Dominick Sarsfield, 1st Viscount Sarsfield of Kilmallock (c. 1570 – 1636) was an Irish peer and judge who became Chief Justice of the Irish Common Pleas, but was removed from office for corruption and died in disgrace.

== Early history ==
Dominick Sarsfield was born in Cork, third son of Edmund Sarsfield, an alderman of the city. His first wife was Joan Terry (or Tirry), daughter of Edmond Terry, a future Lord Mayor of Cork, and Catherine Galway. His second wife was Anne Bagenal, daughter of Sir Nicholas Bagenal and Eleanor Griffith, sister of Henry Bagenal and widow of Dudley Loftus, son of the Archbishop of Dublin. He had at least five children: William the eldest son and heir, Dominick, Jenet, Ellen, and Catherine. They were probably all the children of his first marriage: William was certainly Joan's son, as it is known that he and her nephew, the Catholic martyr William Tirry, were first cousins.

Dominick entered Middle Temple in 1593, and returned to Ireland to practice at the Bar before 1600. He was appointed Attorney General of the provincial Court of Munster in 1600 and Chief Justice of Munster in 1604/5. In 1607 he was appointed a judge of the Court of King's Bench in Ireland and he became Chief Justice of the Irish Common Pleas in 1612. He was made the first Irish baronet in 1619 and ennobled in 1625. He chose the title Viscount Kinsale but became embroiled in a bitter dispute with the de Courcy family, who already had a barony of that name, and he eventually agreed to adopt as his title Kilmallock instead. On the basis of his rank, he claimed precedence over the Lord Chief Justice of Ireland, Sir George Shurley, to the latter's fury: Shurley complained that no such insult had ever been offered to one in his position. Sarsfield's main residence was Carrigleamleary Castle near Mallow, of which only ruins now remain.

== Scandals ==
Despite his acquisition of titles and offices, Sarsfield was always a controversial character, and his manner, which was described as "flinty and truculent", is unlikely to have earned him many friends. He was summoned to the Privy Council in 1615 to answer certain charges which are not clearly set out, although he evidently cleared himself of suspicion. He was accused of permitting his eldest son William to become a Roman Catholic in 1628 (William was certainly a convert to Catholicism, although how his father could have prevented his son from converting is unclear). He was accused of treason in 1631, but the charge was not pursued. Two years later his career was destroyed by the re-opening of the Bushen case from 1625.

== The case of Rex v. Philip Bushen ==
Philip Bushen, a farmer of Grangemellon, County Kildare, was charged with the murder of his wife, Grace, who had died in 1620. He was originally from Devon and was about eighty years old in 1625. Grace's death had generally been accepted as natural—the evidence of murder was thin, and Bushen in his defence pointed out that his main accuser was a bitter personal enemy. That there was widespread doubt about his guilt seems clear—two grand juries refused to indict him. The choice of Sarsfield, who normally went on the Connaught assize to go on the Leinster assize instead, was later thought to be suspicious, but in fact, there was a good reason for it: the Bushen case was to be heard in the Irish language and Sarsfield was the only senior judge who spoke fluent Irish. Sir Lawrence Parsons, recently appointed second Baron of the Court of Exchequer (Ireland), went on the circuit with him, but seems to have played only a minor role in the proceedings.

Sarsfield's actual conduct of the trial however was remarkable even in an age when judicial bullying of juries and witnesses was not uncommon. The Star Chamber later accepted that he had heard the case in private, refused to let Bushen speak in his own defence or to hear witnesses on his behalf, and intimidated the jury by telling them that a certain "great man" had a strong personal interest in their bringing in a guilty verdict. When one juror held out for acquittal, he urged the others to beat him into submission. The most serious accusation was that Sarsfield had agreed with Sir Henry Bellings, High Sheriff of Kildare, that Bushen's property would be forfeited and shared between them, and the Star Chamber seems to have accepted this charge as proven.

=== Downfall ===
Bushen was found guilty and hanged. The case caused some comment at the time, since both the judges, Sarsfield and Parsons (who died in 1628), had a reputation for corruption, but it did not become a major issue until 1633, when opponents of the Lord Deputy of Ireland, Falkland, persuaded Bushen's son to accuse Falkland himself of complicity in the plot to seize his father's lands (the implication being that Falkland was the "great man" with whose anger Sarsfield had threatened the jury). This was a serious mistake: Falkland sued his accusers for libel before the Star Chamber, which exonerated him, censured Bushen and his co-accusers, and imposed a heavy fine. While the Star Chamber found that there was no case against Falkland, the evidence against Sarsfield was so strong that the Court could not overlook it and in the same proceedings, the chamber found him guilty of corruption. Coventry, the Lord Keeper said: "Justice should be done in open court before the face of the world, and men's lives not to be taken away in private chamber... and I do verily persuade myself that Bushen died innocently."

At a second hearing on 20 November 1633, Sarsfield was once more found guilty of corruption, deprived of office, fined £5000, ordered to pay £2000 to Bushen's family, and imprisoned in the Fleet. He died in deep disgrace in 1636, and was buried in Cork.

== Descendants ==
His eldest son William (died 1648) succeeded as second Viscount, but was obliged to sell Carrigleamleary, possibly because of his father's debts. One of Dominick's daughters, Catherine, married Sir John Meade the elder and was grandmother of the prominent politician Sir John Meade, 1st Baronet. Another daughter, Jenet, married William Barrett, of the prominent family which owned Ballincollig Castle.

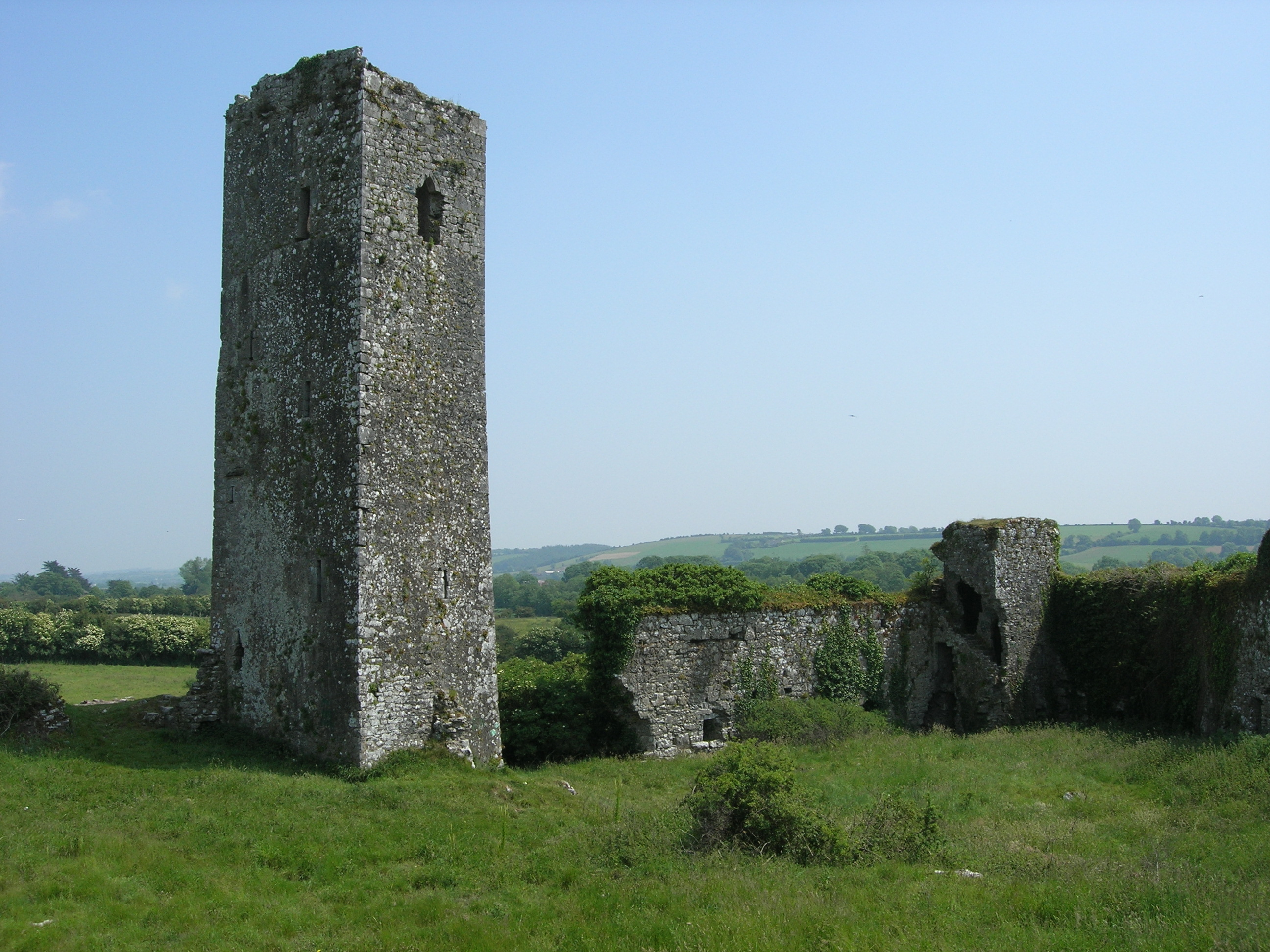
Ballincollig Castle, the home of Sarsfield's daughter, Jenet Barrett.

== Assessment ==
Elrington Ball accepts that Sarsfield was not a judge of the first rank and that his conduct of the Bushen case was improper. However he doubts whether Sarsfield was guilty of the more serious charges, arguing that no judge would risk his career in the hope of a small profit, that Sarsfield always took a strong line with troublesome juries and that he may well have believed Bushen guilty. Wedgwood, on the other hand, accepts that Sarsfield was motivated by greed and argues that his conduct was part of a wider problem of judicial corruption in Ireland, and to some extent in England also. Crawford also accepts that Sarsfield hoped to gain Bushen's estate for himself, and that such behaviour was only to be expected from a judge who had attracted accusations of corruption throughout his career.

Peerage of Ireland
New creation	Viscount Sarsfield; 1627–1636	Succeeded by William Sarsfield
Baronetage of Ireland
New creation	Baronet (of Carrickleamlery); 1619–1636	Succeeded by William Sarsfield
