= Colonel Frederick =

- Prince of Caprera

Head of House von Neuhoff (claimed)
- Reign: 11 December 1756 - 1797
- Predecessor: Theodore of Corsica
- Born: c. 1725
- Died: 1797
- Father: Theodore of Corsica (claimed)
- Mother: Catalina Sarsfield (claimed)

Colonel Frederick is a pseudonym of the 18th-century author of Memoirs of Corsica, Containing the Natural and Political History of that Important Island, 1768, and of The Description of Corsica, 1795. He was born c.1725 and came to London c.1750, but his place of origin is unknown. He claimed to be the son of King Theodore of Corsica, and adopted the title of Prince of Caprera, serving in the army of King Frederick II of Prussia then acting as agent in London for the Duke of Württemberg. He was probably an impostor, and according to some intelligence reports may have been a Polish Jew called Wigliawiski. Though penniless, he managed to gain the acquaintance of those in high circles and was for a time accepted into society. He died in poverty in 1797.

Frederick wrote an account of his purported father's life, Mémoires pour servir à l'histoire de la Corse (literally: Memoirs to serve the history of Corsica), and also an English translation, both published in London in 1768. In 1795 he published an enlarged edition, A Description of Corsica, with an account of its union to the crown of Great Britain. See also Fitzgerald, King Theodore of Corsica (London, 1890). His descendants include the Meredith family who reside in Taumarunui in New Zealand.
