= Charles James (cricketer) =

English cricketer

Charles Cecil James (14 September 1885 – 28 July 1950) was an English first-class cricketer active 1906–21 who played for Nottinghamshire. He was born in New Basford; died in Nottingham.
