= Dominick Sarsfield, 4th Viscount Sarsfield =

Irish Noble and Jacobite

Dominick Sarsfield, 4th Viscount Sarsfield (died 1701) was an Irish aristocrat and supporter of the Jacobite cause during the Williamite War in Ireland.

Part of a prominent Roman Catholic family of Old English descent (although the first Viscount was a Protestant) who owned lands in County Limerick and County Cork, Sarsfield was the son of David Sarsfield, 3rd Viscount Sarsfield and succeeded him following his death in 1687. His mother was Elizabeth de Courcy, daughter of Patrick de Courcy, 13th Baron Kingsale and Mary Fitzgerald, daughter of Sir John Fitzgerald of Dromana. He was married to Frances Sarsfield of Lucan, the sister of Patrick Sarsfield. His letters to Frances show evidence of a deep affection between the husband and wife.

A leading supporter of the Catholic James II, he was a member of the Irish Council. He sat in the Patriot Parliament of 1689 which took punitive measures against Irish Protestants who had risen in support of James' nephew William III.

In 1691, Sarsfield was attainted by the now Williamite-controlled Irish Parliament, losing his title and estates. He took part in the Flight of the Wild Geese that followed the Jacobite defeat in the war. He died in 1701.

His younger brother David Sarsfield also went into exile. David was killed at the Battle of Villaviciosa in 1710 while serving in the Spanish Army. He never seems to have made any effort to claim the title, although he had two sons, as well as a celebrated daughter, Catalina Sarsfield. Dominick Sarsfield, elected Recorder of Kinsale in 1761, was presumably a descendant.

== Bibliography ==
- Gasper, Julia. Theodore Von Neuhoff, King of Corsica: The Man Behind the Legend. Rowman & Littlefield, 2013.

Peerage of Ireland
| Preceded by David Sarsfield | Viscount Sarsfield; 1687–1691 | Attainted |
