= Court of Claims (United Kingdom) =

Body deciding Coronation participation claims

The Court of Claims in the United Kingdom was a special court established after the accession of a sovereign to judge the validity of the claims of persons to perform certain honorary services at the coronation.

The first recorded such court was held in 1377 before the lord high steward. Since the time of Henry VII, commissioners were appointed in lieu, and the court thereafter consisted of a royal commission appointed under the Great Seal.

The court could refer any claim to the sovereign's pleasure, and the sovereign could withdraw a claim from the commission and transfer it to another tribunal.

For the 2023 coronation of Charles III and Camilla, a Coronation Claims Office in the Cabinet Office replaced the court.
