= Viscount Sarsfield =

Title in the Peerage of Ireland

Viscount Sarsfield, of Kilmallock, was a title in the Peerage of Ireland. It was created in 1627 for Sir Dominick Sarsfield, 1st Baronet, Chief Justice of the Irish Common Pleas. He had already been created a Baronet, of Carrickleamlery, in the Baronetage of Ireland in 1619.

The second Viscount converted to the Roman Catholic faith, and is chiefly remembered for sheltering his cousin William Tirry, the martyr.

The titles were forfeited in 1691 by the fourth Viscount for his part in the Williamite war in Ireland. His brother and heir thereby lost any claim to the title.

As often at the time, the family was divided in religion: the first Viscount was a Protestant, but the second and fourth were Roman Catholics.

The title was often cited as "Sarsfield of Kilmallock", and since Sarsfield is a common name in Ireland the holder was often called "Lord Kilmallock" for convenience.

== Viscounts Sarsfield (1627) ==
- Dominick Sarsfield, 1st Viscount Sarsfield (died 1636)
- William Sarsfield, 2nd Viscount Sarsfield (died 1648)
- David Sarsfield, 3rd Viscount Sarsfield (died 1687)
- Dominick Sarsfield, 4th Viscount Sarsfield (died 1701)
