= Lucy Walter =

Welsh noblewoman and mistress of Charles II of England

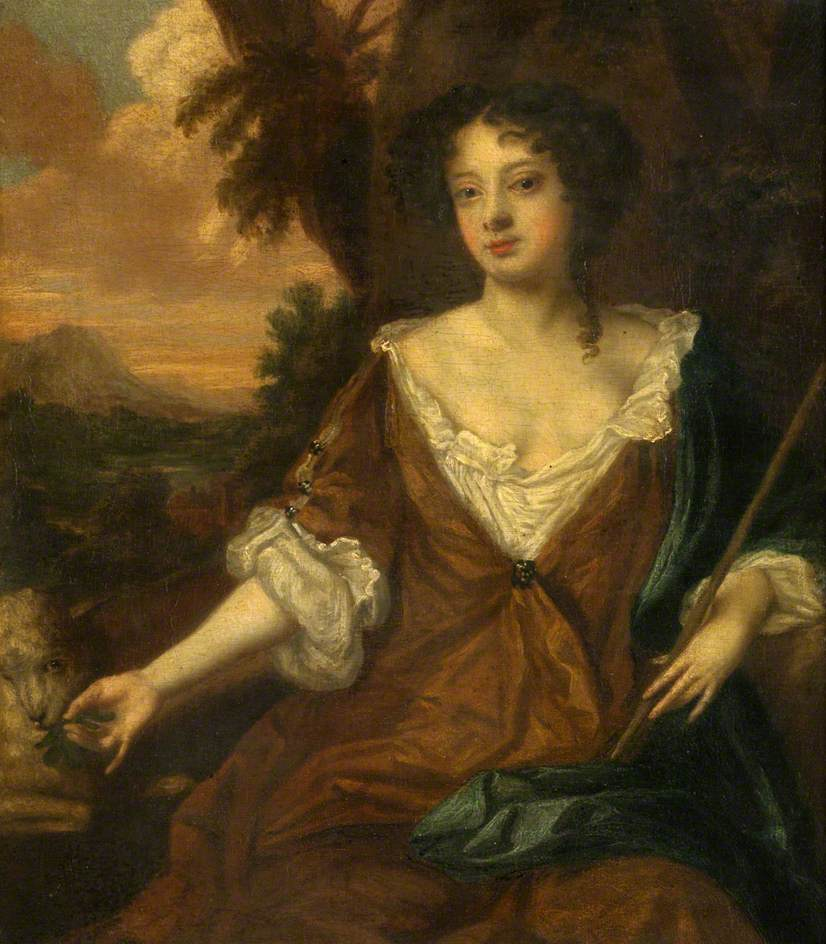
- Portrait by Peter Lely, c. 1650
- Born: c. 1630; Roch Castle, Pembrokeshire, Wales
- Died: 1658 (aged c. 28); Paris, France
- Other name: Lucy Barlow (pseudonym)
- Partner(s): Lord Robert Sidney; Charles II of England; Theobald Taaffe, 1st Earl of Carlingford; Sir Henry de Vic; Lord Thomas Howard
- Children: James Scott, 1st Duke of Monmouth; Mary Crofts
- Parent(s): William Walter; Elizabeth Protheroe

Lucy Walter (c. 1630 – 1658), also known as Lucy Barlow, was the first mistress of King Charles II of England and mother of James, Duke of Monmouth. During the Exclusion Crisis, a Protestant faction wanted to make her son heir to the throne, fuelled by the rumour that the king might have married Lucy, a claim which he denied.

== Life ==
=== Ancestry and early life ===
Lucy Walter was born into minor Welsh gentry as the daughter of William Walter (died 1650) and his wife, born Elizabeth Prothero (died 1652), daughter of John Prothero and niece of John Vaughan, 1st Earl of Carbery. She was probably born in 1630 at her family's home, Roch Castle near Haverfordwest in Pembrokeshire, Wales, and had two brothers, Richard and Justus. She received no formal education but learned etiquette.

As her parents had a strained relationship, they separated in 1640 when Walter was 10 years old. She, her mother and her brothers went to live with her maternal grandmother in London. She may have first met the Sidney family, who held the earldom of Leicester, here through her maternal family members. In 1647, when Walter was 17, after a long legal battle between her parents, the House of Lords ordered her and her brothers to live with their father, as their mother could no longer afford to keep them.

Politician Algernon Sidney (1623–1683), son of the 2nd Earl of Leicester later stated that he had purchased the sexual services of Walter for 40 or 50 gold coins, but was called away to military services and missed out on his bargain. Walter then sailed to the Dutch Republic, either alone or with her uncle, to join the exiled court of Charles, Prince of Wales in The Hague, hoping to find a lover among the many young aristocrats there. She briefly became the mistress of Robert Sidney, brother of Algernon Sidney.

=== Relationship with Charles II ===
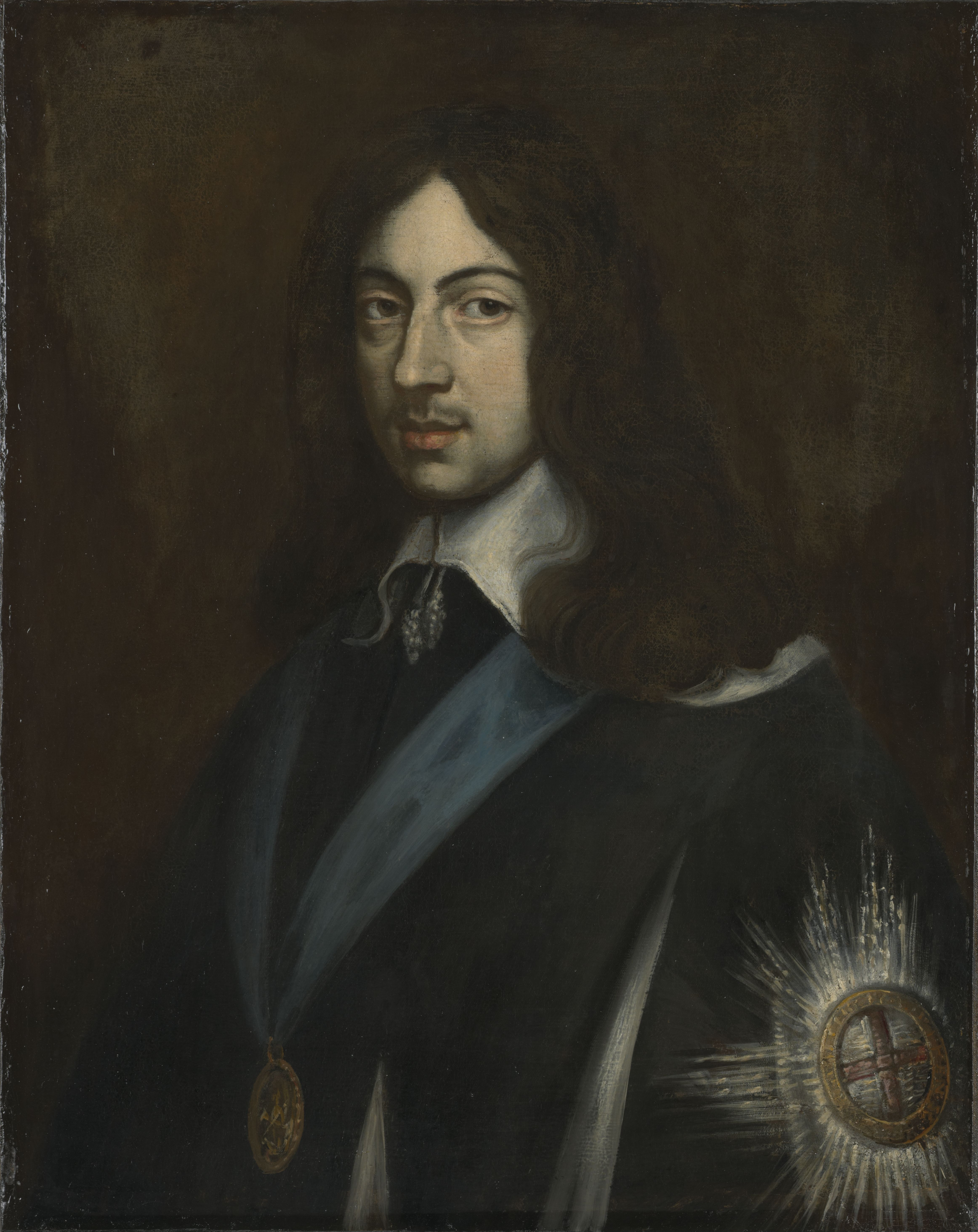
Charles, Prince of Wales (later Charles II), late 1640s

In May 1648, Walter managed to meet and charm Prince Charles, who had by then been living in France but visited The Hague for a short time. They were both only 18, and it is usually assumed that she was his first mistress. They might have resumed their relationship in September 1648, when he was again in the Dutch Republic. On 9 April 1649, Walter gave birth to a son, James (1649–1685), who was acknowledged by Prince Charles as his illegitimate child. The child was sent away to a wet nurse near Rotterdam, while Walter went to live in Antwerp.

In August 1649, Walter travelled to Saint-Germain-en-Laye, France to see Charles, who had become king in January after the execution of his father, Charles I. She shared a coach with writer and diarist John Evelyn, who described their encounter.

I went to [Saint-Germain-en-Laye], to kiss [H]er Majesty's hand; in the coach, which was [The Viscount Wilmot]'s, went Mrs. Barlow, the King's mistress, and mother of the Duke of Monmouth, a brown, beautiful, bold, but insipid creature.

— John Evelyn, Diary of John Evelyn

During July and August 1649 she stayed with Charles in Paris and Saint-Germain-en-Laye, and she may have accompanied him to Jersey in September. It was around this time that she started using the name of her relative, John Barlow of Slebech.

=== Later life ===
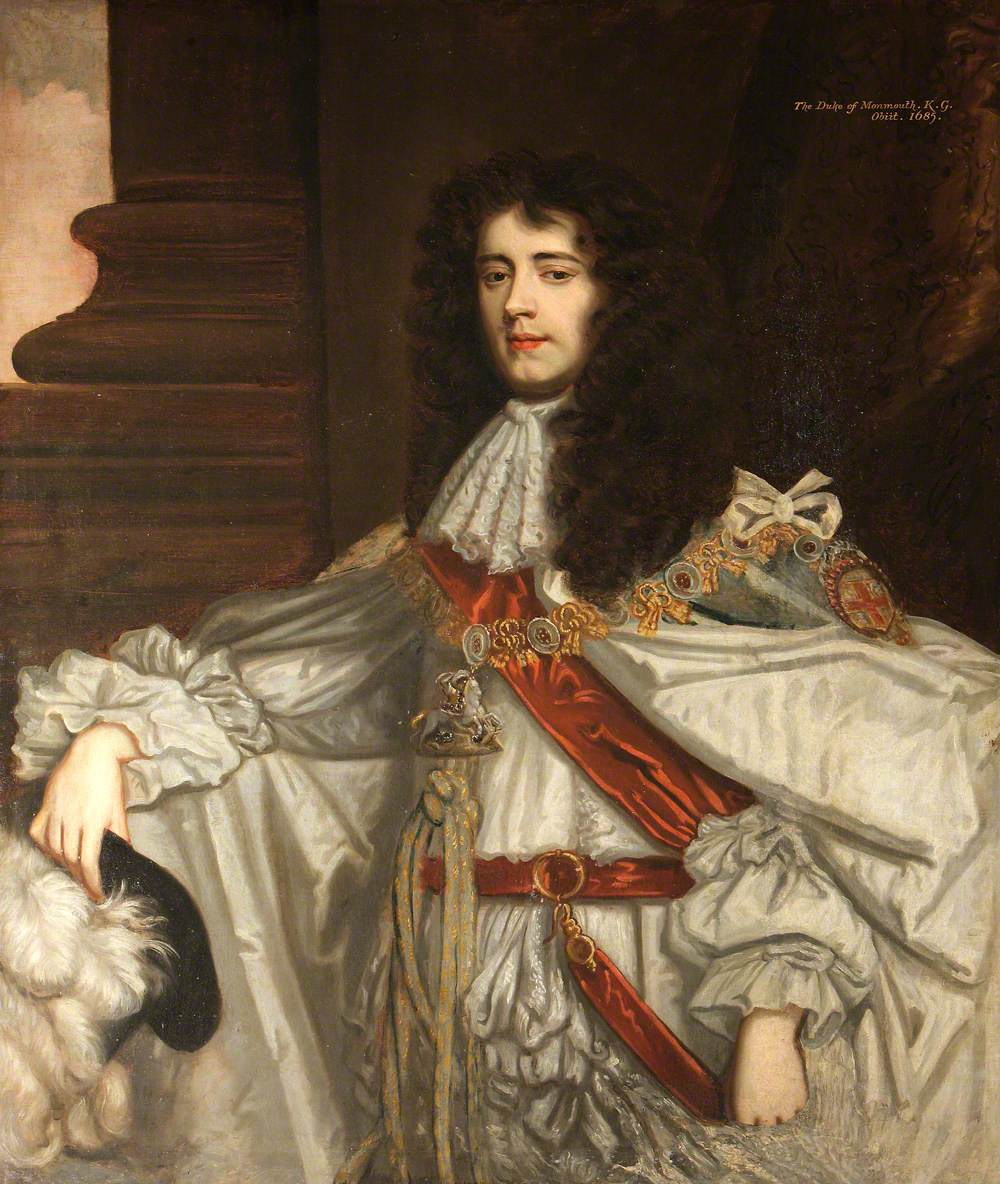
James Scott, Duke of Monmouth, Walter's son, circa 1682

In June 1650, Charles left for Scotland. There was an attempt to kidnap Walter's son, who was missing for 10 days but was eventually found. Her mother took him to Paris for his safety, where she had an affair with Theobald Taaffe, 2nd Viscount Taaffe (later 1st Earl of Carlingford; circa 1603–1677). On 6 May 1651, she gave birth to a daughter, Mary, whose father was probably the Viscount Taaffe. After the Battle of Worcester in late 1651, Charles escaped from England and returned to the Dutch Republic. This time, he made it clear to Walter that their relationship was over, which she could not accept. For the next four years, she was involved in one scandal after another, causing much embarrassment to the exiled royal court. During this time, she considered marrying Sir Henry de Vic, 1st Baronet (circa 1599–1671), which eventually came to nothing. She then returned to The Hague and became the mistress of Thomas Howard, brother of the 3rd Earl of Suffolk.

In early 1656, when she was in Cologne, some of the king's friends persuaded her to return to England by giving her cash and a pearl necklace and promising her a yearly allowance of £400. She went to live in London with Lord Thomas, her children and a maid, Ann Hill. They lived over a barber shop near Somerset House. She was suspected of being a spy, and at the end of June 1656, she and Hill were arrested and imprisoned in the Tower of London. After interrogation, they were released in July and deported back to the Dutch Republic. By this time, Lord Thomas had left her and she had no money to feed her children, as King Charles was unable to pay her allowance. She threatened him with releasing his letters to the public if he did not pay. The king, wanting custody of their eight-year-old son, attempted to kidnap him in December 1657, and succeeded at capturing him in March 1658. James was then sent to Paris and placed in the care of William, Lord Crofts, whose surname he started using.

Soon, Walter also moved to Paris. She was dying from a venereal disease. She made a General Confession of her life to John Cosin, future Bishop of Durham, insisting that she had married King Charles. She allegedly gave proof of this to Cosin, which he kept in a black box. This box was then supposedly inherited by Sir Gilbert Gerard, Cosin's son-in-law. Walter died between 29 August and December 1658 and was probably buried in the Huguenot cemetery in the Faubourg Saint-German district of Paris. After his restoration to the throne, King Charles took their son James to England and created him Duke of Monmouth. Because of his complicated childhood, James never learned to read and write properly.

== Aftermath during the Exclusion Crisis ==
The marriage of King Charles and Catherine of Braganza (1638–1705) did not produce legitimate children, leaving his brother, James, Duke of York (1633–1701) as heir to the throne. The duke was Catholic, and many people wanted a Protestant monarch. Rumours spread that the king had married Lucy Walters, making the Duke of Monmouth legitimate.

Sir Gilbert Gerard, who supposedly had the box containing proof of the marriage was summoned before the Privy Council in January 1678, and testified that he knew nothing of the proof. The king also denied the marriage. After King Charles' death in 1685, the Duke of York became king as James II, and the Duke of Monmouth started a rebellion against him, which was crushed in the Battle of Sedgemoor. The duke was beheaded.

== Issue ==
Lucy Walter had two children:

- By Charles II of England (1630–1685):
  - James Scott, Duke of Monmouth (9 April 1649, Rotterdam – 15 July 1685, London), who married Lady Anne Scott (1651–1732) and had issue;
- Probably by Theobald Taaffe, 1st Earl of Carlingford (1603–1677):
1. Mary Crofts (born 6 May 1651, The Hague), who married first William Sarsfield (died 1675) and had issue, and second William Fanshawe (died 1708), with whom she also had issue.

== In popular culture ==
- Her descendant, Lord George Scott, published a biography called Lucy Walter Wife or Mistress. London: George G. Harrap & Co. Ltd, 1947.
- The novelist Elizabeth Goudge published a novel about Lucy, The Child from the Sea, in 1970.
- In the 2003 television documentary, The Boy Who Would Be King, Sandra Darnell portrays Lucy Walter.

== See also ==
- English and British royal mistresses
