= Patrick Sarsfield, 1st Earl of Lucan =

Irish army officer

The Right Honourable The Earl of Lucan
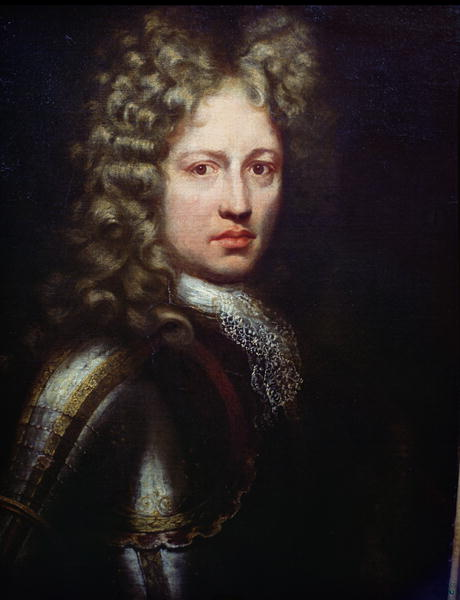
- Portrait thought to be Sarsfield, now held in the Franciscan Library, Killiney

MP for County Dublin
- In office May 1689 – August 1689 Serving with Simon Luttrell
- Monarch: James II

Personal details
- Born: c. 1655
- Died: August 1693 Huy, Belgium
- Resting place: St Martins' church, Huy
- Spouse: Honora Burke
- Children: James Sarsfield, 2nd Earl of Lucan
- Parent(s): Patrick Sarsfield (1628 – after 1693); Anne O'Moore
- Occupation: Soldier

Military service
- Battles/wars: Third Anglo-Dutch War; Franco-Dutch War; Entzheim; Turckheim; Salzbach; Altenheim; Monmouth Rebellion; Battle of Sedgemoor; 1688 Invasion of England; Wincanton Skirmish; Williamite War in Ireland; The Boyne; Limerick 1690; Aughrim; Limerick 1691; Nine Years' War; Steenkerque; Landen

Patrick Sarsfield, 1st Earl of Lucan (c. 1655 – August 1693) was an Irish army officer. Fatally wounded at the Battle of Landen on 29 July 1693 while serving in the French Royal Army, he died of his injuries several weeks later, and is now best remembered as an Irish patriot and military hero.

Born into a wealthy Catholic family, Sarsfield began his military career during the 1672 to 1674 Third Anglo-Dutch War. After fellow Catholic James II of England was deposed by the Glorious Revolution in November 1688, Sarsfield served as a senior commander in the Jacobite army during the 1689 to 1691 Williamite War in Ireland, and was elected to the 1689 Patriot Parliament.

Fighting in Ireland ended with the 1691 Treaty of Limerick. Under the agreement, thousands of Irish soldiers went into exile in France, and many served in Flanders during the Nine Years' War, including Sarsfield.

== Personal details ==
The Sarsfield family was descended from Sir William Sarsfield, an English merchant who settled in Dublin. Knighted in 1566, reportedly for providing Elizabeth I financial support during Shane O'Neill's rebellion, he later purchased Lucan Manor, a large estate to the west of Dublin, and Tully Commandery in County Kildare.

The family had converted to Catholicism by the time his great grandson Patrick was born in 1655, younger son of Patrick Sarsfield (c. 1628 – after 1693) and Anne O'Moore, daughter of Rory O'Moore, who played a leading part in the 1641 rebellion. During the 1641 to 1652 Irish Confederate Wars, the older Sarsfield sided with Confederate Ireland, but belonged to the moderate faction that sought an agreement with Protestant Irish Royalists.

Although his estates were confiscated in 1652, they were returned in 1662. His eldest son William married Mary Crofts, reputedly an illegitimate daughter of Charles II and younger sister of James Scott, Duke of Monmouth.

In 1689, Sarsfield married the 15-year-old Honora Burke (1674–1698), daughter of William Burke, 7th Earl of Clanricarde; they had one son, James Sarsfield, 2nd Earl of Lucan (1693–1719). After Sarsfield's death, she married James FitzJames, 1st Duke of Berwick, eldest but illegitimate son of James II of England.

Catalina Sarsfield, who called herself Queen of the brief-lived Kingdom of Corsica, is often cited as Sarsfield's daughter, but was in fact a distant cousin. Her father David Sarsfield came from another branch of the family, and was killed at the Battle of Villaviciosa in 1710.

== Early career: France and England ==
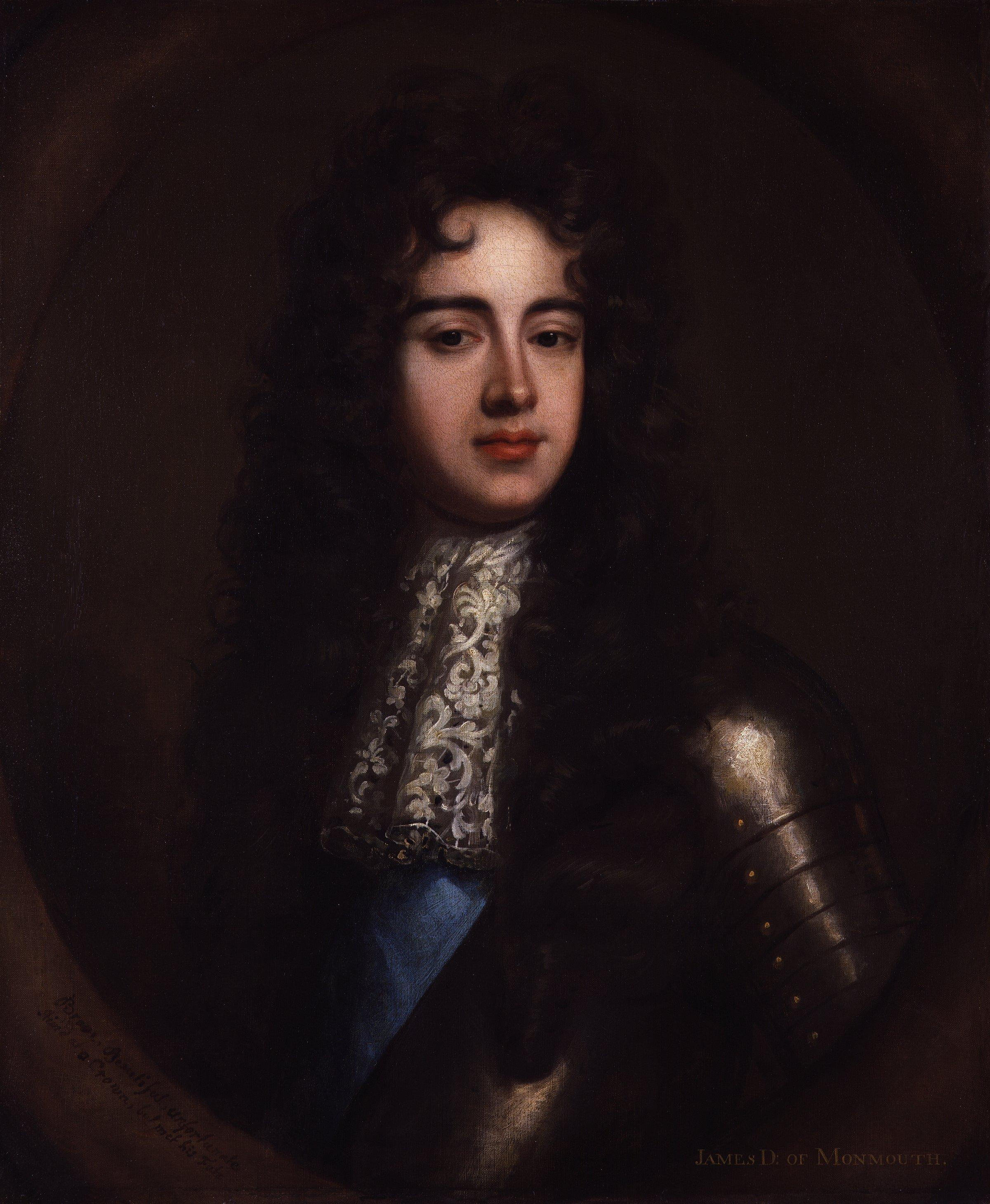
James Scott, Duke of Monmouth, illegitimate son of Charles II and Sarsfield's brother-in-law, who gave him a commission in his regiment

There are few surviving records of Sarsfield's early life, although it is generally agreed he was brought up on the family estates at Tully. While some biographies claim he was educated at a French military college, there is no evidence for this.

In the 1670 Treaty of Dover, Charles II agreed to support a French attack on the Dutch Republic, and supply 6,000 troops for the French army. When the Franco-Dutch War began in 1672, Sarsfield was commissioned into his brother-in-law Monmouth's regiment, which formed part of this Brigade. Although England left the war in 1674, the Brigade continued to serve in the Rhineland, under Turenne. Sarsfield transferred into a regiment commanded by Irish Catholic Sir George Hamilton.

Sarsfield fought at Entzheim, Turckheim and Altenheim; he and Hamilton were standing next to Turenne when he was killed by a chance shot at Salzbach in July 1675. He remained in France until the war ended in 1678, then returned to London to join a new regiment being recruited by the Earl of Limerick. However, the Popish Plot then resulted in Sarsfield and other Catholics being barred from serving in the military.

This left him short of money, and Sarsfield became involved in an expensive legal campaign to regain Lucan Manor from the heirs of his brother William, who died in 1675. This ultimately proved unsuccessful amid allegations of forged documents, and in 1681 he returned to London, where he made two separate attempts to abduct an heiress and was lucky to escape prosecution. When Charles's Catholic brother James became king in 1685, Sarsfield rejoined the army and fought in the decisive Battle of Sedgemoor, which ended the Monmouth Rebellion. James was keen to promote Catholics, whom he viewed as more loyal, and by 1688 Sarsfield was colonel of a cavalry unit.

After Richard Talbot, 1st Earl of Tyrconnell, was appointed Lord Deputy of Ireland in 1687, he began creating a Catholic-dominated Irish army and political establishment. Aware of preparations for invasion by his nephew and son-in-law William of Orange, James sent Sarsfield to Dublin in September to persuade Tyrconnell to provide him with Irish troops. This proved unsuccessful, and in November James was deposed by the Glorious Revolution. Sarsfield took part in the Wincanton Skirmish, one of the few military actions during the invasion. He remained in England until January when he was allowed to join James in France.

== Williamite War in Ireland ==
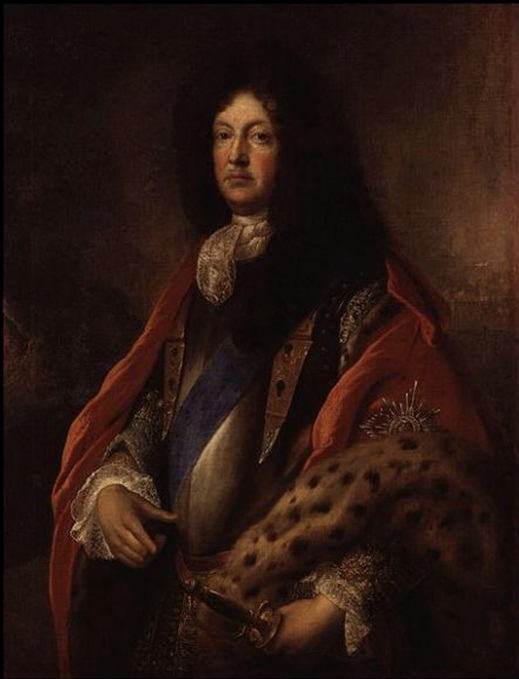
Tyrconnell; he and Sarsfield became bitter opponents over Jacobite policy in Ireland

Accompanied by French troops and English exiles, James landed in Ireland in March 1689, beginning the Williamite War in Ireland. Sarsfield was promoted brigadier, elected to the 1689 Irish Parliament for County Dublin, and commanded cavalry units in the campaign in Ulster and Connacht. When an Irish brigade was sent to France in October, French ambassador D'Avaux proposed Sarsfield as its commander. He noted that while "not...of noble birth [...], (he) has distinguished himself by his ability, and (his) reputation in this kingdom is greater than that of any man I know [...] He is brave, but above all has a sense of honour and integrity in all that he does".

James rejected this, stating that although unquestionably brave, Sarsfield was 'very scantily supplied with brains.' His role at the Boyne was peripheral, although the battle was less decisive than often assumed, Jacobite losses being around 2,000 from a force of 25,000. James returned to France, leaving Tyrconnell in control; he was the leader of the "Peace Party", who wanted to negotiate a settlement preserving Catholic rights to land and public office. Sarsfield headed the "War Party", who felt they could gain more by fighting on; it included the Luttrell brothers, Nicholas Purcell and English Catholic William Dorrington, a former colleague from Monmouth's Regiment.

The position of the War Party was strengthened by the Declaration of Finglas, which offered the rank and file amnesty but excluded senior officers. French victories in the Low Countries briefly increased hopes of a Stuart restoration, and the Jacobites established a defensive line along the Shannon. Sarsfield cemented his reputation with an attack on the Williamite artillery train at Ballyneety, widely credited with forcing them to abandon the first siege of Limerick. The Jacobites also retained Athlone, offset by the loss of Kinsale and Cork, which made resupply from France extremely difficult.

With Tyrconnell absent in France, Sarsfield took control and in December 1690, arrested several leaders of the peace faction. He then bypassed James by asking Louis XIV directly for French support, and requesting the removal of Tyrconnell and the army commander Berwick, James' illegitimate son. The latter, who later described Sarsfield as "a man [...] without sense", albeit "very good-natured", left Limerick for France in February.

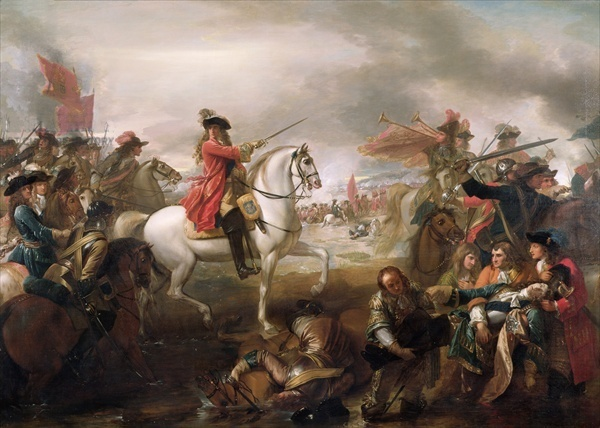
The Battle of the Boyne, July 1690

Tyrconnell returned in January 1691, carrying letters from James making Sarsfield Earl of Lucan, an attempt to placate an "increasingly influential and troublesome figure". A large French convoy arrived at Limerick in May, along with St Ruth, appointed military commander in an attempt to end the conflict between the factions. St Ruth and 7,000 others died at Aughrim in July 1691, reputedly the bloodiest battle ever on Irish soil. Sarsfield's role is unclear: one account claims he quarrelled with St Ruth and was sent to the rear with the cavalry reserves.

The remnants of the Jacobite army regrouped at Limerick; Tyrconnell died of a stroke in August, and in October, Sarsfield negotiated terms of surrender with Godart de Ginkel, the Dutch commander of the Williamite army. He has been criticised for this, having constantly attacked Tyrconnell for advocating the same thing, while it is suggested the Williamite army was weaker than he judged. However, the collapse of the Shannon line and surrender of Galway and Sligo left him little option; without French supplies, the military position was hopeless, and defections meant his army was dissolving.

The military articles of the Treaty of Limerick preserved the Jacobite army by allowing its remaining troops to enter French service; about 19,000 officers and men, including Sarsfield, chose to leave in what is known as the Flight of the Wild Geese. Sarsfield's handling of the civil articles was less successful; most of its protections were ignored by the new regime, although Sarsfield may have viewed it as temporary, hoping to resume the war.

== Exile and death ==
On arrival in France, Sarsfield became Major-General in the army of exiles, an appointment James made with great reluctance. In addition to other acts of perceived insubordination, Sarsfield allegedly told William's negotiators at Limerick "change but kings with us, and we will fight it over again". After the planned invasion of England was abandoned in 1692, the exiles became part of the French army, and Sarsfield a French marechal de camp.

He fought at Steenkerque in August 1692, and was fatally wounded at the Battle of Landen in July 1693, dying at Huy some time between 3 and 11 August. Despite several searches, no grave or burial record has been found, although a plaque at St Martin's church, Huy, has been set up in commemoration and an announcement in 2023 stated that, pending exhumation and identification, his remains had been located. Like much else, his reputed last words, "Oh that this had been shed for Ireland!", are apocryphal.

== Legacy ==
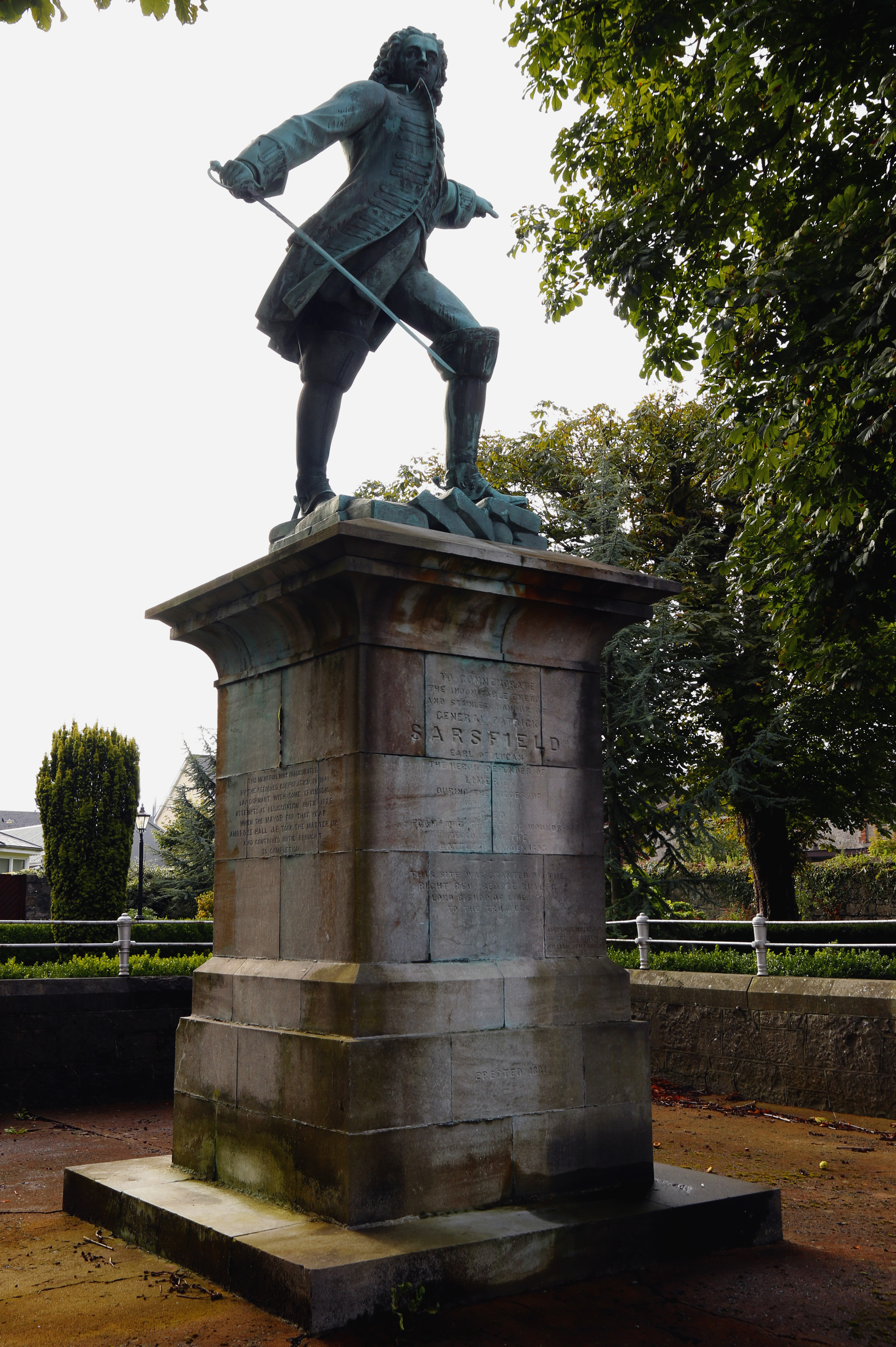
Sarsfield as Irish patriot: 1881 statue in Limerick

Sarsfield left few contemporary records, and those that exist are "disconcertingly incomplete". It is impossible to determine his precise political views, almost nothing is known of his family life, and none of the alleged portraits of him can be authenticated. This allowed later writers to use him as a vehicle for their own needs, especially his portrayal as the "heroic ideal of an Irish soldier".

His success at Ballyneety remains his most famous achievement, although a 1995 study suggests it had limited military value, and his men may have indiscriminately slaughtered women and children. He has also been criticised for the role he played in creating divisions within the Jacobite camp; senior officers considered him rash and easily manipulated, although he seems to have been popular with the rank and file.

Mythologising began during his lifetime; the poet Dáibhí Ó Bruadair, 1625 to 1698, composed a panegyric describing Sarsfield as virtuous, heroic, popular and a great leader, but admitted they had not met. The anonymous song "Slán le Pádraig Sáirseál", or "Farewell to Patrick Sarsfield", is considered a classic of Irish-language poetry. Nineteenth-century nationalists like Thomas Davis celebrated him as a national hero and patriot, while in the early 20th century he was also depicted as a staunch Catholic.

During the 1912 to 1914 Home Rule crisis, his image as a brave and honourable patriot was used to counter Unionist claims that Catholics, and by definition nationalists, were incapable of self-government. When the Irish Folklore Commission began collecting material in the 1930s, they recorded many oral narratives about Sarsfield, including stories of buried gold, generosity to the poor, having his horse shod backwards to escape from pursuers, and apparitions of dogs or white horses.

The global Irish diaspora meant his name and reputation were commemorated beyond Ireland; Michael Corcoran, a Federal general in the United States Civil War, claimed to be a direct descendant. From 1870 to 1880, a unit in the California National Guard formed from recruits of Irish descent was called the Sarsfield Grenadier Guards. Towns that bear his name include Sarsfield, Ontario, and Sarsfield in Victoria, Australia.

"Sarsfield" appears on the coat of arms for County Limerick; in Limerick city itself, there is a Sarsfield Bridge and Sarsfield Street, while the local Irish Army base is Sarsfield Barracks. An 1881 bronze statue by sculptor John Lawlor stands in the grounds of St John's Cathedral. Part of the route used for the attack on the Williamite siege train is marked out today as Sarsfield's Ride, and is a popular walking and cycling route through County Tipperary, County Clare and County Limerick.

The song "Jackets Green" by Michael Scanlan is about a soldier fighting alongside Patrick Sarsfield in the Williamite war.

== Ancestry ==
Ancestors of Patrick Sarsfield, 1st Earl of Lucan

8. Patrick Sarsfield
4. Peter Sarsfield
9. Cicilie FitzHenry
2. Patrick Sarsfield
10. Toirdelbach Ó Díomasaigh, Viscount Clanmalier
5. Eibhlín Ní Dhíomasaigh
11. Mary FitzGerald
1. Patrick Sarsfield, Earl of Lucan
12. Calbhach Ó Mórdha
6. Ruairí Ó Mórdha
13. Margaret Scurloug
3. Áine Ní Mhórdha
14. Patrick Barnewall
7. Jane Barnewall
15. Mary Bagenal

== Sources ==
- Atkinson, CT (1946). "Charles II's regiments in France, 1672 - 1678". Journal of the Society for Army Historical Research. 24 (100). JSTOR 44228420.
- Bradshaw, Brendan (2016). And so began the Irish Nation: Nationality, National Consciousness and Nationalism in Pre-modern Ireland. Routledge. ISBN 978-1472442567.
- Bromley, J. S. (1970). The New Cambridge Modern History: Volume 6, The Rise of Great Britain and Russia, 1688-1715/25. CUP Archive. ISBN 978-0-521-07524-4.
- "California Milita and National Guard Unit Histories Sarsfield Grenadier Guard". Military Museum.
- Connolly, SJ (2008). Divided Kingdom: Ireland 1630-1800. OUP. ISBN 978-0199543472.
- Gasper, Julia (2012). Theodore von Neuhoff, King of Corsica: The Man Behind the Legend. University of Delaware Press. ISBN 978-1611494402.
- Gibney, John (2011). "Sarsfield is the Word: the Heroic Afterlife of an Irish Jacobite". New Hibernia Review. 15 (1): 64–80. doi:10.1353/nhr.2011.0007. S2CID 144104766.
- Hayes-McCoy, G. A. (1942). "The Battle of Aughrim". Journal of the Galway Archaeological and Historical Society. 20 (1).
- Hayton, David (2004). Ruling Ireland, 1685-1742: Politics, Politicians and Parties. Boydell.
- Holmes, Richard (2008). Marlborough: Britain's Greatest General: England's Fragile Genius. Harper Press. ISBN 978-0007225712.
- Irwin, Liam. "Dictionary of Irish Biography: Sarsfield, Patrick". Cambridge University Press.
- Irwin, Liam (1995). "Sarsfield: the Man and the Myth". In Whelan, Bernadette (ed.). The Last of the Great Wars: Essays on the War of the Three Kings in Ireland 1688–91. University of Limerick Press. pp. 130–138. ISBN 978-1874653325.
- Kiberd, Declan (1979). Synge and the Irish Language. Springer. ISBN 9781349045709.
- Lenihan, Padraig (2003). 1690; Battle of the Boyne. The History Press Ltd. ISBN 978-0752425979.
- Lynn, John A. (1999). The Wars of Louis XIV, 1667–1714. Addison Wesley Longman. ISBN 978-0582056299.
- MacManus, Seaumas (2018). The Story of the Irish Race. Chartwell Books. ISBN 978-0785836414.
- Robertson, Barry (2014). Royalists at War in Scotland and Ireland, 1638–1650. Ashgate. ISBN 978-1409457473.
- "Sarsfield Ontario". Sarsfield Community Association. 5 February 2015.
- "Sarsfield, Victoria". Victorian Places.
- Scouller, R.E (1987). "Catholic and Jacobite Officers". Journal of the Society for Army Historical Research. 65 (261). JSTOR 44229734.
- "The Fighting 69th". Archived from the original on 6 January 2007.
- Wauchope, Piers (1992). Patrick Sarsfield and the Williamite War. Dublin. ISBN 978-0-7165-2476-2.
- Wauchope, Piers (2004). "Sarsfield, Patrick, Jacobite first earl of Lucan". Oxford Dictionary of National Biography (online ed.). Oxford University Press. doi:10.1093/ref:odnb/24671. (Subscription, Wikipedia Library access or UK public library membership required.)

Parliament of Ireland
Preceded by Sir William Domville; Sir William Ussher	Member of Parliament for County Dublin; 1689; With: Simon Luttrell	Succeeded by John Allen; Chambré Brabazon
Peerage of Ireland
New creation	— TITULAR — Earl of Lucan; Jacobite peerage 1691–1693	Succeeded by James Sarsfield
