= Lucan House =

Georgian-Palladian house in Dublin, Ireland

Coordinates: 53°21′25.92″N 6°27′10.99″W

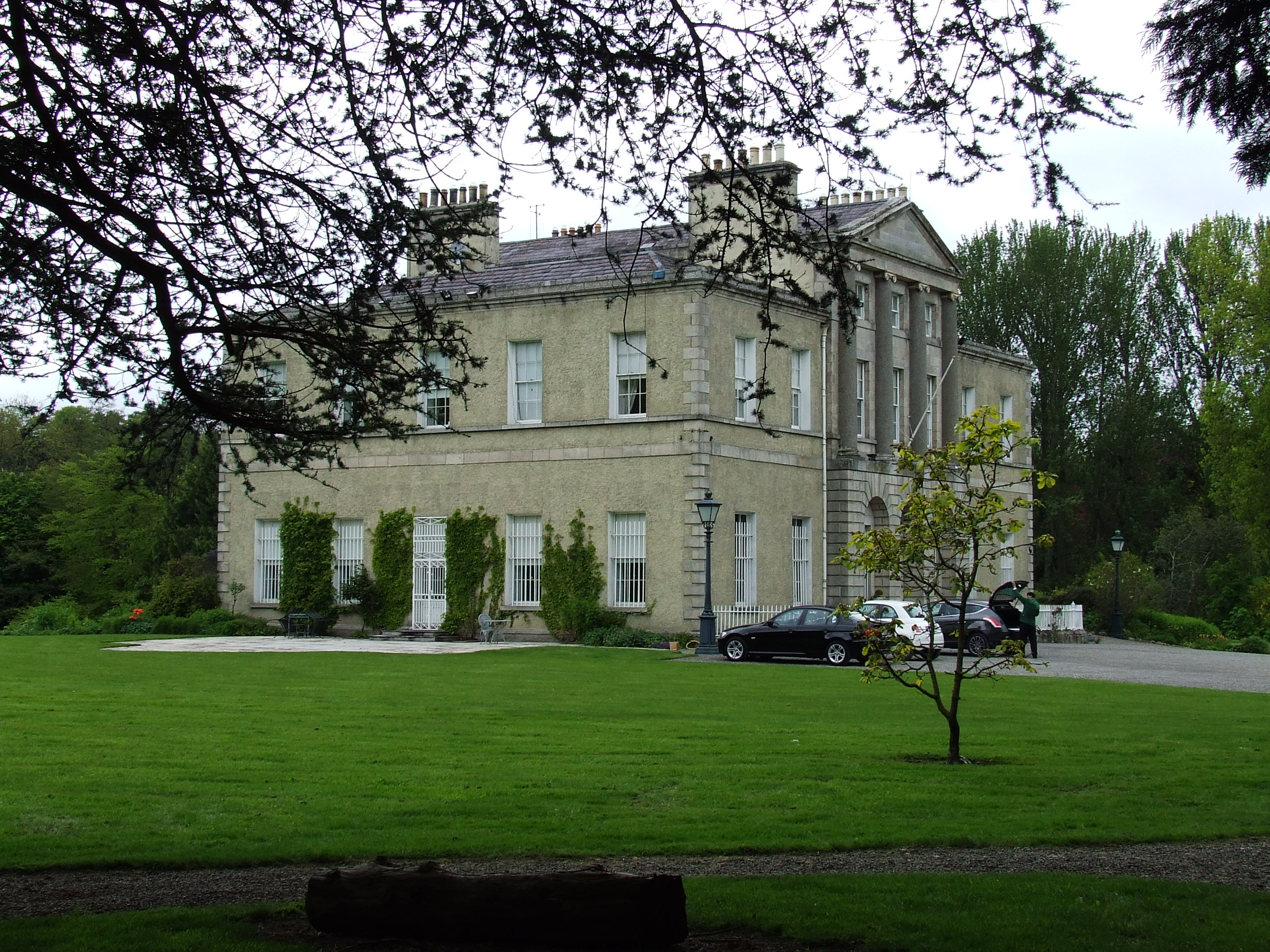
- Lucan House (1775), once the residence of the Italian ambassador in Ireland

- Location within Dublin
- Former names: Lucan Manor

General information
- Type: House
- Architectural style: Palladian
- Location: Lucan, Dublin, Ireland
- Current tenants: Vacant
- Construction started: 1772
- Estimated completion: 1775
- Owner: South Dublin County Council

Technical details
- Material: granite and pebble dash
- Floor count: 3

Design and construction
- Architects: William Chambers; Agmondisham Vesey; James Wyatt (interior, oval office and sarsfield monument)
- Developer: Agmondisham Vesey
- Other designers: Michael Stapleton (stucco work)
- Designations: Protected Structure

Lucan House is a Georgian-Palladian house and estate in Lucan, County Dublin. A manor house, it is remembered particularly for its association with the Sarsfield family. A castle or house has been recorded on the site since at least the 12th century.

== History ==
Lucan Manor was mentioned on the pipe roll as far back as 1272 when it was granted to Norman landowners following the invasion of Ireland. The Sarsfield family;s involvement with the property began when it was bought in 1566 by the Tudor era figure Sir William Sarsfield, who passed it on to his younger son. The anor remained in the hands of the Sarsfields until the Cromwellian conquest of Ireland when they were dispossessed of it due to Patrick Sarsfield's role in the Irish Rebellion of 1641. It was then awarded to the Irish soldier Sir Theophilus Jones. After the Irish Restoration in 1660, the Sarsfields attempted to recover the estate. Despite their appeals being rejected in court, they were eventually able to secure its return following the intervention of Charles II.

There were further disputes following the death of William Sarsfield in 1675, with the manor eventually passing to his daughter, Charlotte Sarsfield, who married Agmondisham Vesey.

Lucan Manor was demolished in the 1770s and its Georgian era Palladian villa replacement, Lucan House, was constructed around 1775 by Agmondisham Vesey and today still stands on the site. Upon the death of Vesey in 1785, the house and estate passed to his son George Vesey. On his death the house passed to his daughter Elizabeth Vesey and her husband Sir Nicholas Colthurst, 4th Baronet. They and their descendants then had the house from 1836 to 1921.

The contents of the house were sold in their entirety in September 1925 by Sir Richard St John Jefferyes Colthurst, 8th Baronet. Later, the house was acquired by Charles Hugh O'Conor, the son of Charles Owen O'Conor in the 1930s. The house was owned by William Teeling for a period in the 1940s when it featured in Country Life magazine.

As of 2022, the house was the residence of the Italian ambassador to Ireland. The Italian government had been renting the property since 1942 and acquired it in 1954.

In 2023, the house was acquired by South Dublin County Council for around €15 million, with the Italian ambassador moving to a large house in Dartry.

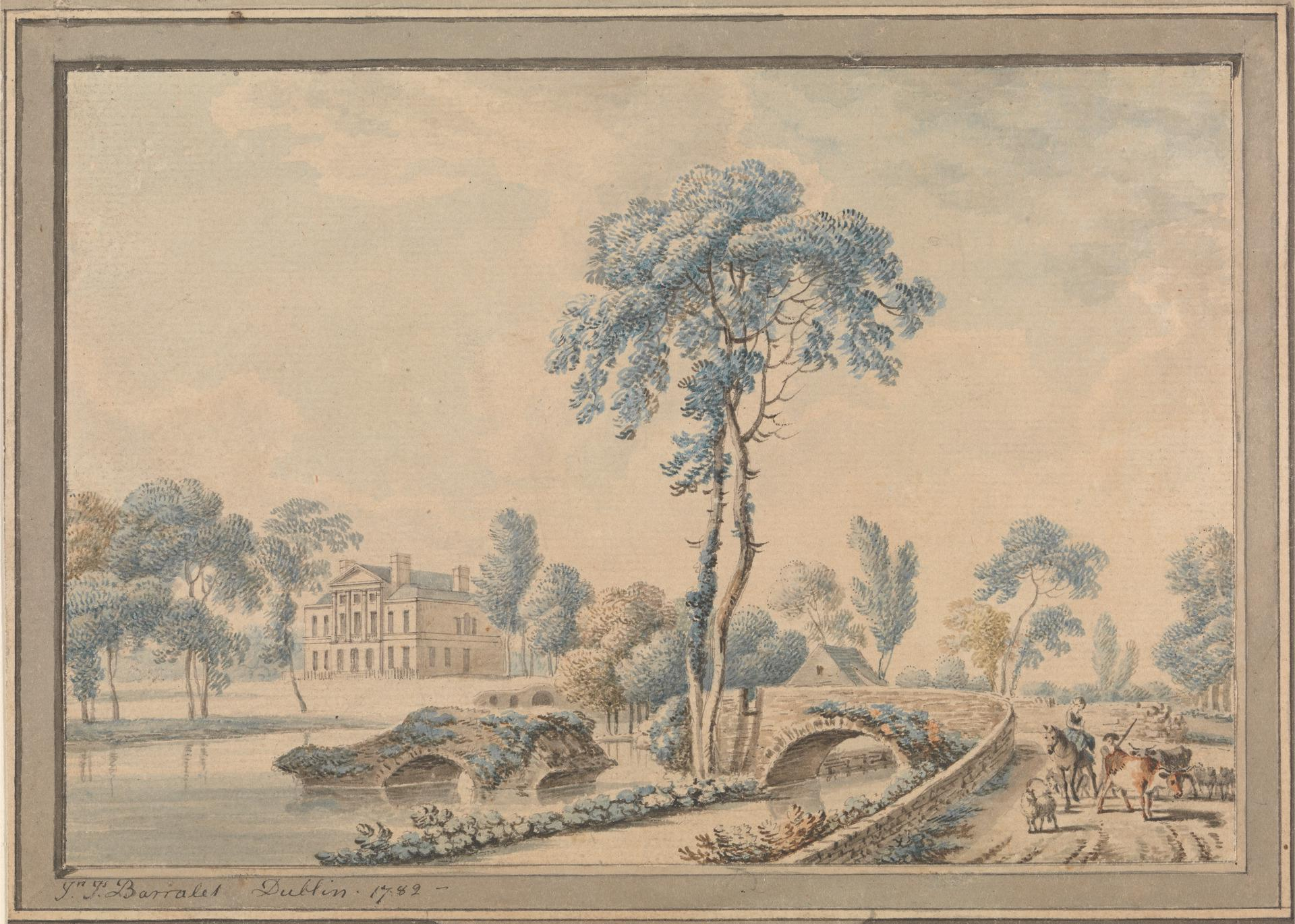
A drawing of the house in 1782 by John James Barralet taken from Yale Center for British Art

== Bibliography ==
- Wauchope, Piers. Patrick Sarsfield and the Williamite War. Irish Academic Press, 1992.
