= William Sarsfield =

Mayor of Dublin, Ireland

Sir William Sarsfield was an Irish landowner, public official and soldier of the sixteenth century.

Sarsfield was from a wealthy merchant family, part of the Old English inhabitants of The Pale, some of whom remained Roman Catholic following the Reformation, although Sir William himself was a member of the Established Church and a loyal subject of the English Crown. Sarsfield served as Mayor of Dublin from 1566 to 1567. He was knighted by Queen Elizabeth I in 1566 for his service against Shane O'Neill, the rebellious Gaelic lord of Tyrone.

He purchased estates at Tully Castle in County Kildare and Lucan Manor in County Dublin and is allegedly buried in the (now ruined) Church of the Blessed Virgin Mary, Lucan, in an unmarked grave; presumably in the nave of the church. He was appointed seneschal of the Royal manors of Esker and Crumlin and presided over a court in Esker, the proceedings of which were recorded and some of which are extant and available to view in Marsh's Library, Dublin City. He married Mabel FitzGerald, daughter of George FitzGerald of Tircroghan. He was the grandfather of Peter Sarsfield of Tully. His daughter Eleanor married Robert Dillon, Chief Justice of the Irish Common Pleas, thus allying the Sarsfield's with another powerful family of the Pale. Among his many other descendants was his great-great-grandson Patrick Sarsfield, who famously fought on the Jacobite side during the Williamite War in Ireland (1689–1691).

== Bibliography ==
- Wauchope, Piers. Patrick Sarsfield and the Williamite War. Irish Academic Press, 1992.

Civic offices
Preceded by Nicholas FitzSimon	Mayor of Dublin; 1566–1567	Succeeded by John FitzSimon
