= Kingdom of Corsica (1736) =

Unrecognized Mediterranean island from March–November

Kingdom of Corsica Regnu di Corsica (Corsican) Regno di Corsica (Italian) Königreich Korsika (German)
- 1736
- Flag Coat of arms
- Motto: Prudentia et industria vincitur tyrannis; Pro bono publico regno corsice
- Anthem: Dio vi salvi Regina ("God save you Queen")
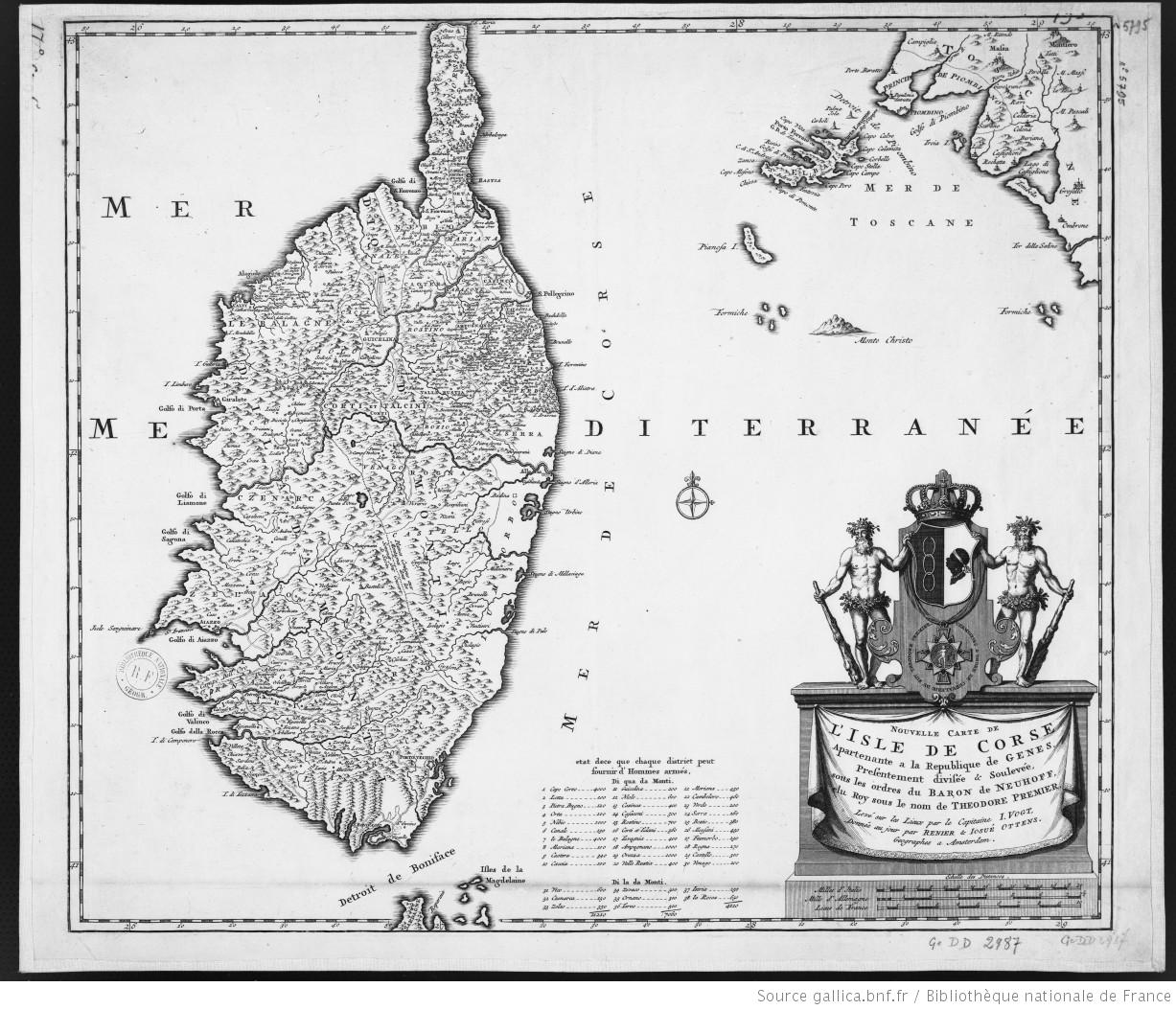
- 1737 map of Corsica commissioned by King Theodore
- Status: Unrecognized state
- Capital: Cervione; Corte
- Common languages: Italian; Corsican; French; German
- Religion: Roman Catholicism
- Government: Unitary parliamentary constitutional monarchy
- King
  - 1736: Theodore I
- Legislature: Diet
- History
  - Established: March 1736
  - Constitution: 15 April 1736
  - Disestablished: 11 November 1736

Area
- 8,680 km^{2} (3,350 sq mi)
- Currency: Soldo
Preceded by	Succeeded by
Republic of Genoa	Republic of Genoa
- Today part of: France ∟ Corsica

The Kingdom of Corsica was a short-lived kingdom on the island of Corsica. It was formed after the islanders crowned the German adventurer Theodor Stephan Freiherr von Neuhoff as King of Corsica.

== Formation and downfall ==
At Genoa, Neuhoff made the acquaintance of some Corsican rebels and exiles, and persuaded them that he could free their country from Genoese tyranny if they made him king of the island. With the help of the Bey of Tunis, he landed in Corsica on March 12, 1736 with military aid. The islanders, whose campaign had not been successful, elected and crowned him king. He assumed the title of King Theodore I, issued edicts, instituted an order of knighthood, and waged war on the Genoese with consent of the 24-member Diet, at first with some success. But in-fighting among the rebels soon led to their defeat. The Genoese put a price on his head and published an account of his colourful past, and he left Corsica on November 11, 1736, ostensibly to seek foreign assistance. After sounding out the possibility of protection from Spain and Naples, he set off to Holland, where he was arrested for debt in Amsterdam.

On regaining his freedom, Theodore sent his nephew to Corsica with a supply of arms; he himself returned to Corsica in 1738, 1739, and 1743, but the combined Genoese and French forces continued to occupy the island. In 1749 he arrived in England to seek support, but eventually fell into debt and was confined in a debtors' prison in London until 1755. He regained his freedom by declaring himself bankrupt, making over his kingdom of Corsica to his creditors, and subsisted on the charity of Horace Walpole and some other friends until his death in London in 1756.

== See also ==
- Corsican Republic

== Bibliography ==
- Bent, J. Theodore (1886). "King Theodore of Corsica", The English Historical Review, Vol. 1, No. 2, pp. 295–307.
- Fitzgerald, Percy (1890). King Theodore of Corsica. London: Vizetelly.
- Gasper, Julia (2012). Theodore von Neuhoff, King of Corsica: the Man Behind the Legend. University of Delaware Press.
- Graziani, Antoine-Marie (2005). le Roi Théodore. Paris: Tallandier, coll. « Biographie ». 371 p., 22 cm. – ISBN 2-84734-203-6. (in French)
- Pirie, Valerie (1939). His Majesty of Corsica: The True Story of the Adventurous Life of Theodore 1st. London: William Collins & Sons.
- Vallance, Aylmer (1956). The Summer King: Variations by an Adventurer on an Eighteenth-Century Air. London: Thames & Hudson.
