= John Goddard Richards =

Irish barrister and justice of the peace

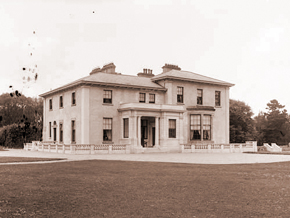
Ardamine House

John Goddard Richards (November 1793 – 13 April 1846) was an Irish barrister, justice of the peace, and High Sheriff of Wexford for 1824. He was the eldest son and heir of the leading surgeon Solomon Richards and his wife Elizabeth Groome, daughter of the Reverend Edward Groome. He owned land on the Roebuck Estate in County Dublin and the Ardamine Estate in County Wexford.

He married firstly Anne-Catherine Ward, daughter of the Hon. Robert Ward, fourth son of Bernard Ward, 1st Viscount Bangor, and his second wife Louisa Jane Symes, by whom he had six children. He married secondly Mary Adams Rawson, daughter of the noted oculist Sir William Rawson (formerly Adams) and Jane Rawson of Belmont, County Wicklow, and sister of the senior Government official Sir Rawson William Rawson. After his death Mary remarried the English judge John Billingsley Parry. eldest son and heir was Solomon Augustus Richards. His daughter Emily Sophia Richards married the Reverend Philip Walter Doyne, vicar of Monart, County Wexford, and was the mother of the noted ophthalmologist Robert Walter Doyne.
