= Robert Doyne =

Robert Doyne may refer to:

- Sir Robert Doyne (1651–1733), Irish politician and judge
- Robert Walter Doyne (1857–1916), British ophthalmologist
