= Solomon Augustus Richards =

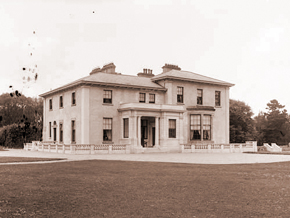
Ardamine House, the Richards family home, which was destroyed by fire in 1921

Solomon Augustus Richards (August 1828 - 13 January 1874) was High Sheriff of Wexford in 1854. He was a captain in the Wexford Militia. He was the eldest son and heir of the barrister John Goddard Richards and his first wife Anne Catherine Ward, and the grandson of the surgeon Solomon Richards and of the politician Hon. Robert Ward. He succeeded to his father's estates in 1846. He owned land on the Roebuck Estate in County Dublin and the Ardamine Estate in County Wexford. He married his first cousin Sophia Mordaunt Ward, daughter of the Reverend Bernard John Ward (his mother's brother) and Isabella Phillips, who died on 11 August 1899 at age 70. They had three sons. They are both buried in the Ardamine graveyard.
