= High Sheriff of Wexford =

The High Sheriff of Wexford was the British Crown's judicial representative in County Wexford, Ireland from the 16th century until 1922, when the office was abolished in the new Irish Free State and replaced by the office of Wexford County Sheriff.

The sheriff had judicial, electoral, ceremonial and administrative functions and executed High Court writs. In 1908, an Order in Council made the Lord-Lieutenant the Sovereign's prime representative in a county and reduced the High Sheriff's precedence. However, the sheriff retained his responsibilities for the preservation of law and order in the county. The usual procedure for appointing the sheriff from 1660 onwards was that three persons were nominated at the beginning of each year from the county and the Lord Lieutenant then appointed his choice as High Sheriff for the remainder of the year. Often the other nominees were appointed as under-sheriffs. Sometimes a sheriff did not fulfil his entire term through death or other event and another sheriff was then appointed for the remainder of the year. The dates given hereunder are the dates of appointment. All addresses are in County Wexford unless stated otherwise.

== High Sheriffs of County Wexford ==
- Sir Richard Synnott of Ballybrennan
- 1355 Nicholas Brown (also Escheator of County Wexford)
- 1414 John Roche
- 1423: Robert Bosschier
- 1543: Patrick de Lonport
- 1548: Oliver Sutton
- 1570: Sir Thomas Masterson
- 1591: Walter Synnott
- 1595 : Lodowick Bryskett
- 1596: Leonard Colclough
- 1620: Nicholas Loftus
- 1627: Patrick Esmonde
- 1630: Sir Adam Colclough, 1st Baronet, of Tintern Abbey
- 1649: Walter Talbot of Ballynamony
- 1652: Thomas Sadleir of Sopwell Hall
- 1656: Thomas Dancer
- 1666: Christian Bor
- 1666: Francis Harvey
- 1667:
- 1675: Richard Nunn of St Margaret's
- 1677: Nathaniel Boyse of Bannow
- 1678: Matthew Forde
- 1680: John Cliffe
- 1683: Patrick Lambert of Carnagh
- 1686: Robert Carew
- 1688: Patrick Colclough of Mohurry or Duffry Hall
- 1689:
- 1692: Thomas Sadleir of Sopwell Hall
- 1694: John Harvey of Killiane Castle
- 1695: Thomas Sadleir of Sopwell Hall
- 1696: Edward Kenney of Newfort House
- 1697:

== 18th century ==
- 1700: Thomas Palliser of Portobello
- 1701: John Chichester
- 1702:
- 1707: Richard Saunders of Saunders Court
- 1708: Abel Ram of Ramsfort and Clonattin
- 1709: Joshua Nunn of St Margaret's (son of Richard, HS 1675)
- 1712: Richard le Hunte of Llanrian, Pembrokeshire
- 1714: __? Edwards
- 1715: Francis Toplady
- 1716: Jeremy Sims
- 1720: Jacob Boyse
- 1721:
- 1724: Richard Donovan of Ballymore
- 1727: Abraham Thomas Hughes of Ballytrent
- 1728: John Richards of Solsborough
- 1729: Thomas Palliser of Portobello
- 1730: Loftus Hatton of Clonard
- 1731: John Nunn of St Margaret's (son of Joshua, HS 1709)
- 1732:
- 1737: George Ogle
- 1737: Charles Tottenham of Tottenham Green
- 1738: Arthur Gore, 1st Earl of Arran of the Arran Islands
- 1739: John Stratford, 1st Earl of Aldborough
- 1740: William Alcock
- 1741: Robert Doyne of Wells
- 1742:
- 1744: Henry Loftus, 1st Earl of Ely
- 1746: John Grogan of Johnstown
- 1747: Alan Cox of New Ross
- 1749: John Tottenham, later Sir John Tottenham, 1st Baronet of Tottenham Green
- 1750:
- 1753: Solomon Richards of Solsborough
- 1754: Joshua Nunn of St Margaret's (son of John, HS 1731)
- 1755: Richard Boyse of Bannow
- 1756: James Stopford, 1st Earl of Courtown
- 1757: Arthur Saunders Gore, 2nd Earl of Arran of the Arran Islands
- 1758: John Hatton of Clonard
- 1759:
- 1763: Edward Cookman
- 1764: John Devereux of Kilrush and then Newton Barry
- 1767: Vesey Colclough of Tintern Abbey
- 1768: George Reade
- 1769: Adam Colclough of Duffry Hall
- 1771: William Piggott of Slevoy Castle
- 1774: Sir John Freke, 1st Baronet of Castle Freke
- 1775: John Harvey of Killiane Castle
- 1777: Robert Doyne of Wells
- 1778: John Drake of Stokestown
- 1779: Cornelius Grogan
- 1782: Henry Brownrigg, of Wingfield
- 1783: Samuel Tench of Ballyhely
- 1784: Sir Edward Loftus, 1st Baronet of Mount Loftus, Co. Kilkenny
- 1785: John Heatly, of Rockview
- 1788: William Hore
- 1789: William Bolton of the Island
- 1793: Walter Hore of Harperstown
- 1794: William Pemberton Pigott of Slevoy Castle
- 1795:
- 1798: Edward Perceval of Barntown
- 1798: Christian Wilson of Scar

== 19th century ==
- 1800: Joshua Nunn
- 1801:
- 1802: James Boyd
- 1803: Henry Archer
- 1804: George St George Irvine
- 1805: Sir Nicholas Loftus, 2nd Baronet of Mount Loftus, Co. Kilkenny
- 1806: Pierce Newton King
- 1807: William Goff
- 1808: William Scott
- 1808: Arthur Meadows of Whitestown or Hermitage
- 1809: William Percivall
- 1810: Thomas Derenzy
- 1811: William Goff
- 1812: Christian Wilson
- 1813: Walter Hore
- 1814: William Blacker
- 1815: John Hatton
- 1816: William Bolton of the Island
- 1817: William Augustus le Hunte
- 1818: Solomon Richards of Solsborough
- 1819: Richard Donovan of Ballymore
- 1820: Joshua Nunn
- 1821: John Christopher Beauman
- 1822: Henry Alcocke
- 1823: Anthony Cliffe of Bellevue
- 1824: John Goddard Richards of Owna Varra
- 1825: Robert Boyne of Wells, Oulart
- 1827: Charles Tottenham, of Newross, Baronet
- 1828: Walter Hore-Ruthven of Harperstown
- 1829: Abel Ram of Ramsfort
- 1831: James Boyd of Roslare House
- 1833: James Thomas Stopford, 4th Earl of Courtown of Courtown House, near Gorey
- 1834: William Madden Glascott of Alderton House
- 1835: Robert Stephen Doyne of Wells
- 1836: Mathew Thomas de Renzy of Cloughbrennan, Enniscorthy
- 1837: Francis Leigh of Sion
- 1838: George le Hunte of Artramont House
- 1839:
- 1842: Stephen Ram of Ramsfort
- 1843:
- 1845: Patrick W. Redmond of Newtown
- 1846: Charles Tottenham of Ballycurry
- 1846: Harry Alcock of Wilton
- 1848: James George Henry Stopford, 5th Earl of Courtown
- 1849: Sir James Power of Edermine, Enniscorthy
- 1850: Edward Westby Nunn of St. Margaret's, Wexford.
- 1851:
- 1852: William Jacob Blacker of Woodbrook.
- 1853: John Maher of Ballinkeele.
- 1854: Solomon Augustus Richards of Ardamine and Roebuck.
- 1855: John Hyacinth Talbot of Ballytrent
- 1856: William Bolton of the Island
- 1857: Percy Lorenzo Harvey of Kyle.
- 1858: John Rowe of Ballycross.
- 1859: John Hatchell of Fortfield House, Co. Dublin.
- 1860: John Thomas Rossborough-Colclough of Tintern Abbey.
- 1861: Edward Tottenham Irvine of St Aidans.
- 1862–63: Villiers La Touche Hatton of Clonard.
- 1864: Henry Patrick Lambert of Carnagh.
- 1866: John Esmonde.
- 1867: Francis Augustine Leigh of Rosegarland.
- 1868:
- 1870: John d'Olier George of Cahore, Gorey.
- 1871: Charles John Tottenham of Tottenham Green.
- 1872: Robert Westley Hall-Dare of Newtonbarry House.
- 1873: Charles Mervyn Doyne of Wells.
- 1874: Col. Charles George Tottenham.
- 1875: John Manly Arbuthnot Keane, 3rd Baron Keane.
- 1876: William Orme Foster.
- 1877: James Walter Milles Stopford, 6th Earl of Courtown.
- 1878: Matthias Aidan Maher of Ballinkeele.
- 1880: John Talbot Power.
- 1881: Thomas Joseph Walker of Tykillen.
- 1882: Henry Arthur Hunt Boyse of Bannow
- 1882: Sir George Frederick Brooke, 1st Baronet.
- 1883: Henry Bruen of Oak Park, Co. Carlow and Coolbawn
- 1884:
- 1887: Samuel Barrett-Hamilton of Kilmanock House.
- 1888: Richard Donovan of Ballymore.
- 1889: Sir Frederick Hughes of Rosslare Fort and Barntown House.
- 1890: Arthur Henry Chichester, 3rd Baron Templemore.
- 1891: Robert Westley Hall-Dare of Newtonbarry House.
- 1892: Loftus Anthony Bryan of Upton and Borrmount Manor.
- 1893: Walter MacMurrough Kavanagh, The MacMurrough of Kellitatown, Carlow.
- 1894: John Hyacinth Talbot.
- 1895: Henry Jervis Jervis-White of Healthfield.
- 1896: Albert Garner Richards of Macmine Castle.
- 1897: Anthony Loftus Cliffe of Bellevue.
- 1898: Robert Tyndall of Oaklands.

== 20th century ==
- 1900: Philip Clayton Alcock of Wilton.
- 1901: Sir George Errington, 1st Baronet of Lackham House, Wiltshire.
- 1902: William Glascott of Alderton House.
- 1903: Albert Henry Tyndall of Ballyanne House.
- 1904: Gerald Edwin Hamilton Barrett-Hamilton of Kilmanock House.
- 1907: Arthur William Mordaunt Richards.
- 1908: Edward Carew Blacker.
- 1909: Henry Bruen of Oak Park, Co. Carlow and Coolbawn.
- 1910: Henry Thomas Arthur Shapland Boyse of Bannow.
- 1912: Urban Vigors Richards of Solsborough.
- 1913: George Maurice Maher of Ballinkeele, Enniscorthy.
