= Robert Walter Doyne =

Anglo-Irish ophthalmologist

Robert Walter Doyne (1857–1916) was an Anglo-Irish ophthalmologist.

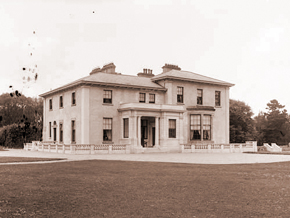
Ardamine House, Gorey, County Wexford, the family home of Doyne's mother Emily Sophia Richards. It was burnt by the IRA in 1921.

He was born in Monart, County Wexford, Ireland, second son of the Reverend Philip Walter Doyne (died 1861), vicar of Monart, and Emily Sophia Richards, daughter of John Goddard Richards, barrister, of Ardamine House, Gorey, County Wexford and his first wife Anna-Catherine Ward, and granddaughter of the noted physician Solomon Richards. He belonged to a junior branch of the long-established Doyne family of Wells House, County Wexford, who were descended from the eminent judge Sir Robert Doyne (1651-1733).

Doyne studied medicine in Oxford, Bristol and St George's Hospital in London. In 1886, he founded the Oxford Eye Hospital, and in 1909 became the first president of the Oxford Ophthalmological Congress.

In 1899 Doyne discovered colloid bodies lying on Bruch's membrane that appeared to merge, forming a mosaic pattern that resembled a honeycomb. Afterwards, this disorder was referred to as "Doyne's honeycomb choroiditis". Today this condition is known to be a rare hereditary form of macular degeneration that results in progressive and irreversible loss of vision. Other names for the disorder are: "macular drusen", "malattia leventinese", "dominant radial drusen" and "Doyne honeycomb retinal dystrophy".

In 1889, he was the first physician to describe angioid streaks, a disorder that affects Bruch's membrane, the innermost layer of the choroid.

He received the honorary degree Master of Arts from the University of Oxford in February 1903.

Two years after his death in 1916, a prized distinction in British ophthalmologic medicine known as the "Doyne Memorial Lecture" was established.

He married Gertrude Hope Hollings, daughter of John Hollings of The Watchetts, Surrey, and had two sons including Philip, who was an ophthalmologist like his father.
