= Solomon Richards =

Solomon Richards may refer to:

- Solomon Richards (soldier)
- Solomon Richards (surgeon)
- Solomon Richards, a character in Grand Theft Auto V and Grand Theft Auto Online
