= Squint =

Looking at something with partly closed eyes

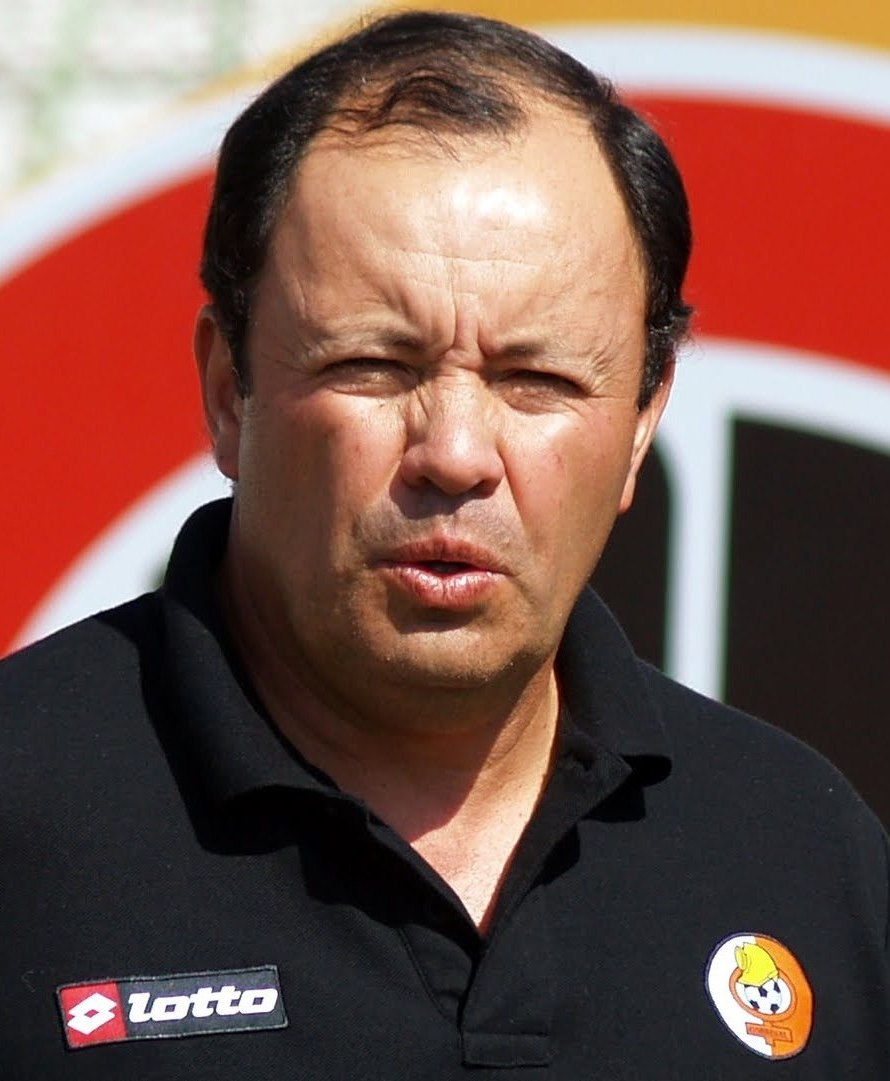
A man squinting on a sunny day

Squinting is the action of looking at something with partially closed eyes.

Squinting is most often practiced by people who suffer from refractive errors of the eye who either do not have or are not using their glasses. Squinting helps momentarily improve their eyesight by slightly changing the shape of the eye to make it rounder, which helps light properly reach the fovea. Squinting also decreases the amount of light entering the eye, making it easier to focus on what the observer is looking at by removing rays of light which enter the eye at an angle and would need to otherwise be focused by the observer's faulty lens and cornea.

Pinhole glasses, which severely restrict the amount of light entering the cornea, have the same effect as squinting.

== Belief ==
It is a common belief that squinting worsens eyesight. However, according to Robert MacLaren, a professor of ophthalmology at the University of Oxford, this is nothing more than an old wives' tale: the only damage that can be caused by squinting for long periods is a temporary headache due to prolonged contraction of the facial muscles.

Squinting is also a common involuntary reflex, especially among people with light colored eyes, during adaptation to a sudden change in lighting such as when one goes from a dark room to outdoors on a sunny day to avoid pain or discomfort of the eyes. The pupillary light reflex caused by adjustment to light takes around five minutes in people with healthy eyes, so squinting and pain after that could be a sign of photophobia.

== In film ==
In film, squinting often denotes mystery. Many eye expressions convey specific feelings, but squinting is more ambiguous, as it can signal multiple emotions, such as suspicion, toughness, and desire. Clint Eastwood built his career out of mastering squinting, expressing everything from terse stoicism as the Man With No Name in The Good, the Bad and the Ugly to romantic desire as Robert Kincaid in The Bridges of Madison County. Manohla Dargis once quipped that "eyes may be windows to the soul, but men like Eastwood like to keep the shades partly drawn."
