= Robert Edwin Newbery =

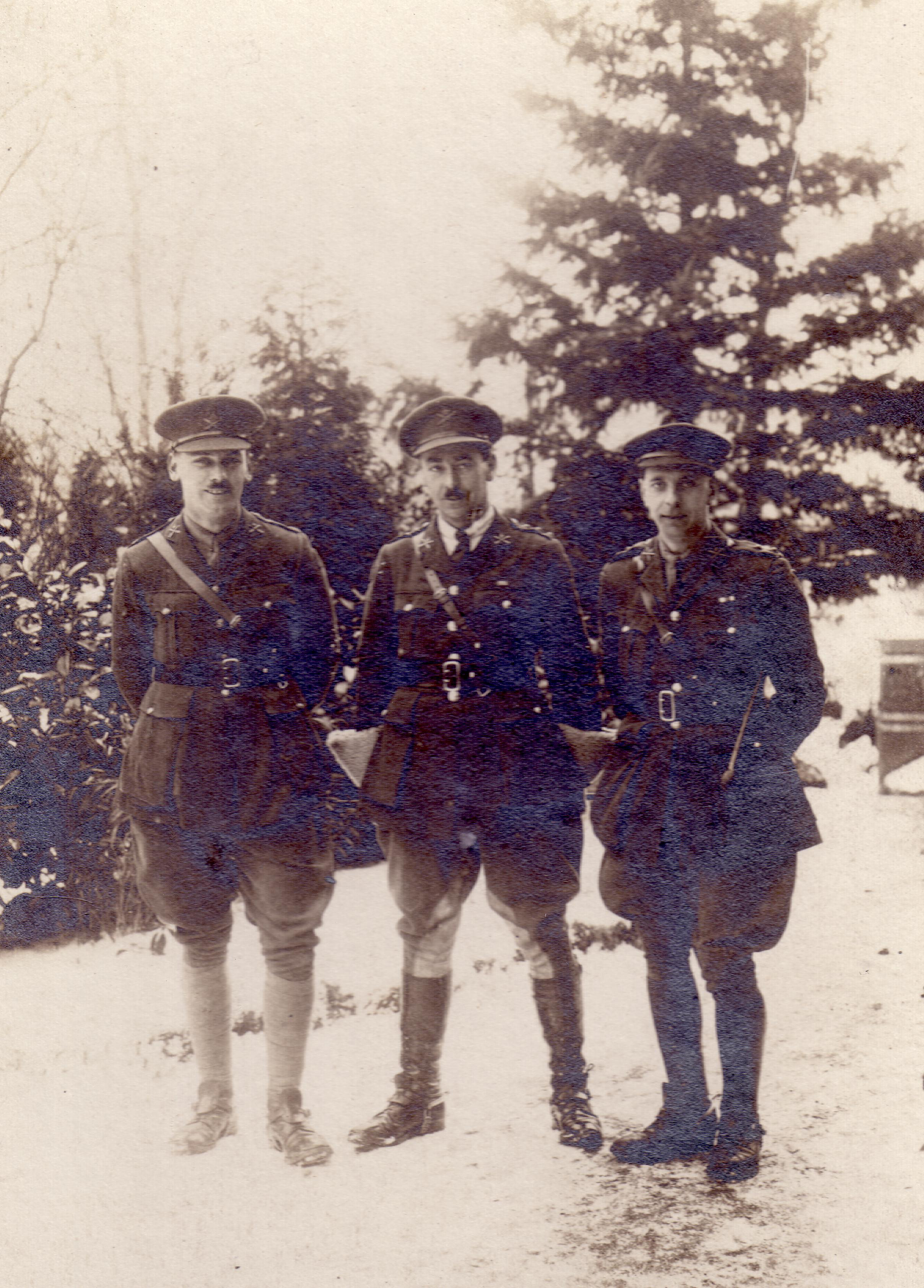
Lt AV Taylor, Capt J Coutts and Lt RE Newbery MC, Officers of 55th Battalion Machine Gun Corps, in Belgium, 1919

Robert Edwin Newbery MC (1884–1967) was one of the two founding partners of Dale and Newbery, the firm of solicitors that has had offices in Southeast England since 1911. He also co-invented the internal triple air flow regulator for the oil burning lamp, which widened the flame for increased light emittance.

== Education ==
Robert Edwin Newbery was born on 24 April 1884 in Shoreditch, London, son of John Newbery and Elizabeth Temperance Gravatt. He grew up on the family farm in Northamptonshire and was educated at Wellingborough School and St John's College, Cambridge (1903) where he read Classics, gaining a BA in 1907 (MA in 1912), under the tutorship of the classical Greek scholar, E. E. Sikes. After Cambridge he qualified in law at the Inns of Court School of Law and practiced as an assistant solicitor before joining Dale and Newbery in 1911.

== Military service ==
In 1916 Newbery joined the Inns of Court Officers Training Corps and was commissioned a Second lieutenant into the 55th Battalion, Machine Gun Corps on 26 August 1917. He was posted to France as part of the British 18th (Eastern) Division. During the Battle of the Selle on 22 October 1918, Newbery crawled forward under sustained German machine gun fire, eventually reaching 200 m in advance of his infantry front line. Despite constant fire at close range, he was able to set up a single machine gun, which he then used to return fire successfully on the German position. With the German machine gun position destroyed, the British infantry could advance unimpeded. Newbery was subsequently awarded the Military Cross (MC) for his actions in what became one of the last battles of the Western Front. The citation for his MC reads:

For conspicuous gallantry and devotion to duty on the morning of 22nd October, 1918, at Croix de Pierre, in command of two guns with the infantry advanced guard. The infantry were harassed by machine-gun fire from a position about 1,000 yards away. He brought his sub-section into action under direct machine-gun fire at about 800 yards, and crawling into position with one gun, succeeded in silencing the enemy gun.

After the war Newbery returned to work with Dale and Newbery but continued serving as a captain in the Territorial Army (TA) with the 8th Battalion of the Middlesex Regiment.

== Honours and decorations ==

Military Cross British War Medal Victory Medal

== Personal life ==
Robert Newbery first married Gertrude Eleanor Nicholson Bourner in 1909, with whom he had four sons: Valentine Roy Newbery (b. 1910); John Alec Newbery (Royal Regiment of Artillery, MBE 1963) and Gerald Edwin Newbery (Royal Regiment of Artillery, MBE 1946) (identical twins, b. 1911); and Dennis Allen Newbery (b. 1916). He married a second time in 1937 to Olga Eileen Jackson from Liverpool (great granddaughter of the inventor Sampson Moore and descendant of the lawyer Sir Anthony Jackson). They had one daughter: Penelope Gael Newbery (b. 1943), mother to the eye surgeon Dr Robert E MacLaren, after whom he was named. Robert Newbery died in Farnham in Surrey on 21 January 1967.
