= William Adams (oculist) =

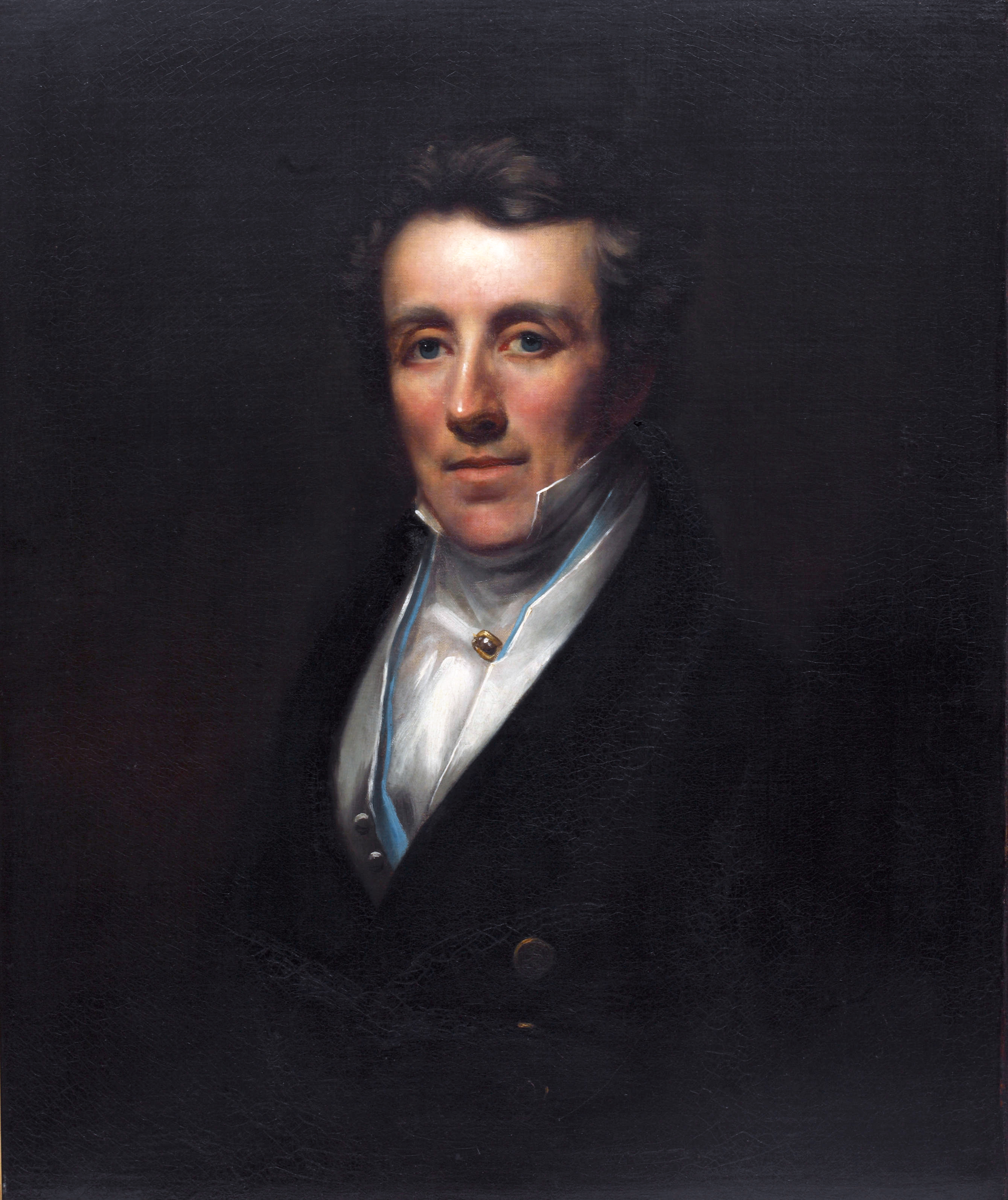
William Rawson (born Adams)

Sir William Adams (1783–1827), also known as Sir William Rawson after 1825, was an English surgeon.

He was born at Morwenstow in Cornwall, youngest son of Henry Adams. He was well known as an ophthalmic surgeon and was founder of Exeter's West of England Eye Infirmary. John Nash had built the Ophthalmic Hospital for him on Albany Street, London. For several years Adams gave his services free to soldiers whose eyesight had been affected in the military campaigns in Egypt. The hospital was closed in 1822.

As a young man, he worked for John Hill, a surgeon in Barnstaple, who sent him to London to obtain his professional qualifications. William Adams was a pupil of John Cunningham Saunders. He became a Member of the Royal College of Surgeons of England in 1807. In 1811 he helped restore some sight to the famous blind organist John Purkis after a series of operations in London and Exeter. He published the book Practical observations on Ectropium in 1814.

Adams was one of the central figures in the controversy which raged between 1806 and 1820 over the treatment of Egyptian ophthalmia, with his critics refusing to accept that his treatment for the condition produced any benefits whatsoever, and subjecting him to a campaign of vilification. He had a valuable political supporter in the future Prime Minister, Lord Palmerston, who persuaded Parliament to award him £4000. He was knighted and became a personal oculist to the Prince Regent and other members of the British royal family. Adams was a gifted man with unbounded energy, but his vanity and passion for publicity, at a time when very few doctors publicized their work, made him numerous enemies.

Adams assumed his wife's family name in accordance with her mother's wishes, and was known as Sir William Rawson after 1825. He married Jane Eliza Rawson (died 1844), fourth daughter of Colonel George Rawson of Belmont House, County Wicklow, MP for Armagh, and Mary Bowes Benson, and had five children, including the senior government official Sir Rawson William Rawson, and Mary, who married firstly the Irish barrister John Goddard Richards of Ardamine Estate, County Wexford, and secondly the English judge John Billingsley Parry.

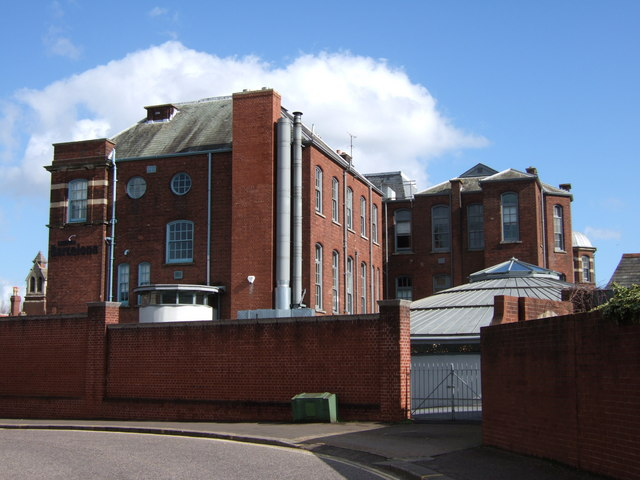
Hotel Barcelona (formerly the West of England Eye Infirmary) in Exeter

== Arms ==
Coat of arms of William Adams

Notes
Licensed on 11 April 1825 by Sir George Nayler (Garter) and Ralph Bigland (Clarenceux).
Crest
1st issuant out of clouds Proper a cubit arm vested Gules the hand in glove Azure holding an anchor fesswise the flukes towards dexter Or the arms charged (for distinction) with a rose Argent (Rawson) 2nd on a mount Vert an eagle standing reverse way and reguardant wings expanded Proper beak and legs Or holding in the mouth a mullet Sable the sinister claw resting on a crescent reversed Gold (Adams).
Escutcheon
Quarterly 1st & 4th per fess Sable and Azure a quadrangular castle with four turrets Argent and in base two bars wavy of the last and (for distinction) a canton Ermine (Rawson) 2nd & 3rd Per fess Azure and Sable on a pale between two mullets in chief Argent a mullet between two crescents of the second (Adams).
Motto
Arx Et Anchora Mihi Deus
