= Angmering School =

The Angmering School

Location
- Station Road; Angmering, West Sussex, BN16 4HH; England; 50°49′17″N 0°29′02″W

Information
- Type: Community school
- Motto: Aspire, Achieve, Angmering
- Established: 1975
- Local authority: West Sussex
- Department for Education URN: 126081 Tables
- Ofsted: Reports
- Headmaster: Simon Liley
- Gender: Coeducational
- Age: 11 to 18
- Enrolment: 1377
- Colours: Light Blue and Dark Blue
- Website: http://www.angmeringschool.co.uk/

The Angmering School is a coeducational community secondary school and sixth form located in Angmering, West Sussex that opened in 1975. The school has Specialist Sports and Science College status. Headteacher Simon Liley was to start in post in 2016. There are approximately 1389 children on roll and a capacity of 1451, with an age range of 11 to 18 years. There is a sixth form college on the site which offers a range of A-Level and vocational Level 3 qualifications.

== Lavinia Norfolk Centre ==
The Lavinia Norfolk Centre (LNC) is a Specialist Support Facility for students with any kind of impairment or disability at the school and is recognised nationally for the support it provides. The LNC has specialist staff who work in the centre and throughout the school.

The centre has various facilities including a hydrotherapy pool, a large physio and fitness suite with specialist equipment, separate classrooms, areas to store equipment, and a large central area for socialising and dining.

The whole school is accessible by wheelchair, with ramps, lifts and automatic doors providing ease of access.

In addition to money from the school budget, the LNC is funded by its own charitable trust, which helps to pay for maintenance, new equipment, activities for students, minibus repairs.

The centre is named for Lavinia Fitzalan-Howard, Duchess of Norfolk from 1937 to 1995.

== History ==
The school first opened in 1975 to provide more secondary school places for the growing population in the area.

Many new buildings have been added to the school site since it first opened to accommodate increasing numbers of students and to provide more specialist classrooms for each subject. These additions include: a canteen, a music block (M block), a library and computer rooms (L block), a sixth form and languages block (C block), outdoor changing rooms, and outdoor sports areas, equipment and pitches.

It has been awarded the Charter Mark.

The site is used by Worthing Hockey Club as their training ground.

=== 2018/20 Renovations ===
In 2018/20 the school underwent substantial renovations to improve and replace learning areas and equipment and to increase the capacity of the school.

==== F Block ====
In October 2018, work started on the building of a new three storey block, to provide new classrooms and facilities for humanities, science and art. The building was completed in time to be used for the 2019/20 school year.

==== Other renovations ====
Other work on the site included, the building of new drama and dance facilities, a larger car park, a new "superloo" toilet area, refurbishment of the existing science block (S block), refurbishment of the existing technology classrooms, moving of the main reception and admin offices, an extension to the outdoor changing rooms, and upgrades to some existing classrooms and facilities.

== Notable former pupils ==
- Prof Robert MacLaren FRCSE, FRCOphth, Professor of Ophthalmology since 2009 at the University of Oxford (Merton College).
- Liam Treadwell, jockey.
- Sam Carter, musician.
- Dino Lamb, professional rugby player for the Harlequins.
- Toby Collyer, professional footballer for Manchester United.

== Headteachers ==
- 1975-1988 Ron Moores
- 1988-2002 Richard Evea
- 2002–2016 David Brixey
- 2016–present Simon Liley
