= Goresbridge =

Village in County Kilkenny, Ireland

Goresbridge An Droichead Nua
- Town
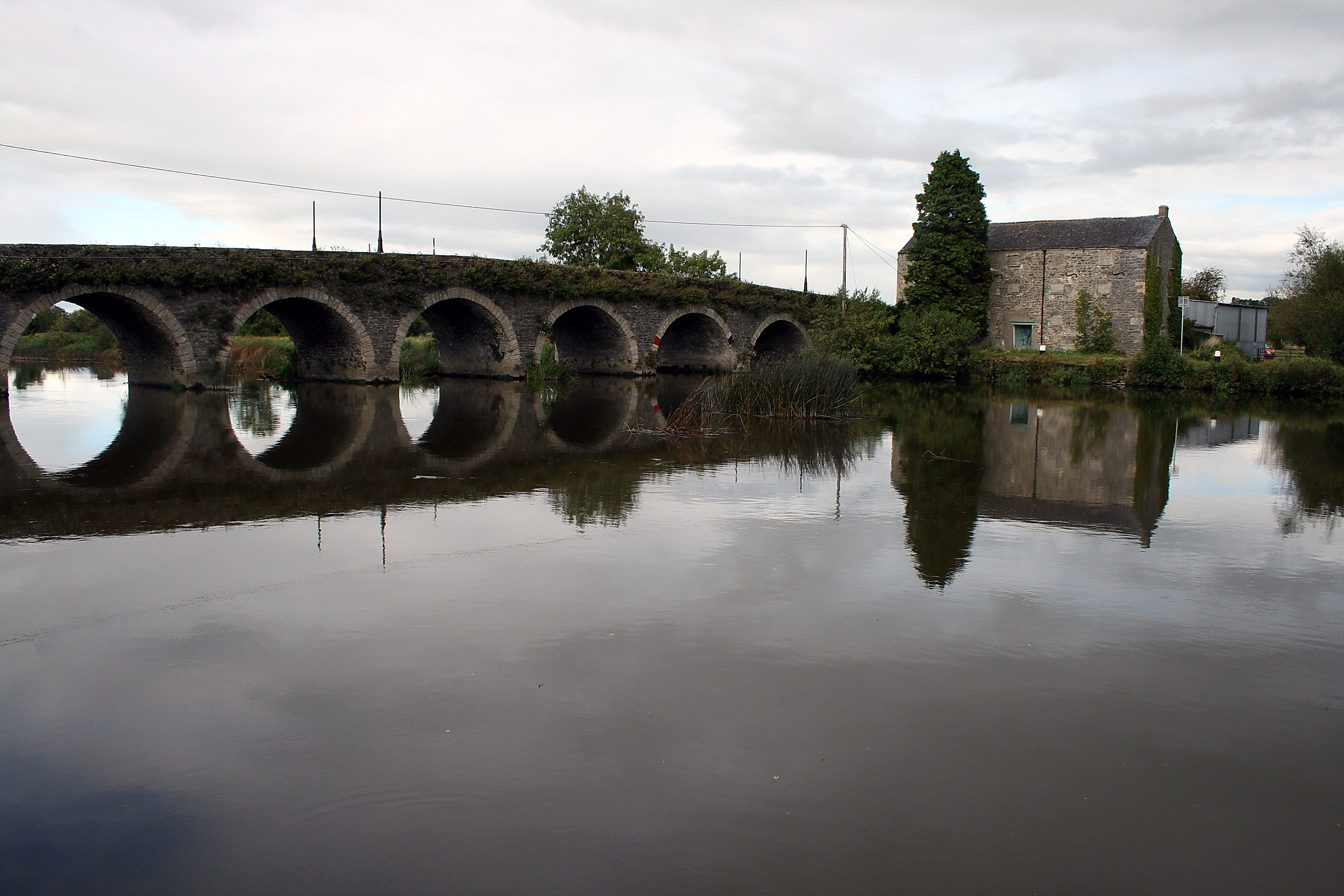
- Goresbridge over the River Barrow
- Etymology: Named after Gores' Bridge
- Location in Ireland
- Coordinates: 52°37′47″N 6°59′39″W
- Country: Ireland
- Province: Leinster
- County: County Kilkenny
- Barony: Gowran

Government
  - Type: County Council
  - Body: Kilkenny County Council
  - Dáil constituency: Carlow–Kilkenny
  - European Parliament: Ireland South

Population (2011)
  - Total: 361
- Time zone: UTC±00:00 (GMT (WET))
  - Summer (DST): UTC+01:00 (IST (WEST))
- Irish Grid Reference: S 69 54
- Website: www.kilkennycoco.ie

Goresbridge (Irish: An Droichead Nua, meaning 'the new bridge') is a small village in the east of County Kilkenny, Ireland. Goresbridge is named after a 1756 bridge, built by Colonel Ralph Gore, crossing the River Barrow between County Kilkenny and County Carlow.

Located 2.75 miles (4.43 km) from Gowran on the R702 (Kilkenny−Enniscorthy) regional road, and approximately 20 kilometres (12 mi) east of Kilkenny.

Part of the civil parish is Grangesilvia which is in the barony of Gowran. Charles II granted Arthur Gore the townland of Barrowmount. The Battle of Goresbridge occurred there in June 1798.

The population according to the 2011 census was 361. The local authority is Kilkenny County Council. Goresbridge gives its name to an electoral division.

== History ==
Goresbridge was located in historic Gaelic kingdom of Ossory (Osraige). Following the Williamite–Jacobite War, Charles II gave grants of land which had been forfeited by the Roman Catholic owners.

Arthur Gore obtained a grant of land, the townland of Barrowmount in parish of Grangesilvia, from Charles II, and by the end of the 17th century the Gore family were well established.

Goresbridge was named for the family and the New Bridge built in 1756 by Colonel Ralph Gore. On the 1846 OSI map of Ireland the village is referred to it as Newbridge.

=== Gore's Bridge ===
Gore's Bridge has nine-arch granite bridge crossing of the River Barrow between County Kilkenny and County Carlow. Built in 1756 by Colonel Ralph Gore the Earl of Ross.

This mid-eighteenth-century elegantly-composed landmark was built using unrefined Carlow granite. It represents an important element of civil engineering and transport heritage and formed a vital link between the two counties.

=== Battle of Goresbridge ===
The Battle of Goresbridge occurred during the Irish Rebellion on 23 June 1798 at Gore's Bridge. During the Wexford Rebellion, and just days after the Battle of Vinegar Hill, Wexford insurgents attempted to use the Gore's Bridge.

The locally stationed Wexford Militia were defeated, they lost their cavalry, twenty eight soldiers were captured, and the rest fled to Kilkenny. There is a carved granite memorial adjacent to the bridge.

== Transport ==
Goresbridge railway station opened on 26 October 1870, closed for passenger traffic on 26 January 1931 and for goods traffic on 27 January 1947, finally closing altogether on 1 April 1963. Kilbride Coaches services Goresbridge from Graiguenamanagh or Kilkenny twice a day, except Sundays

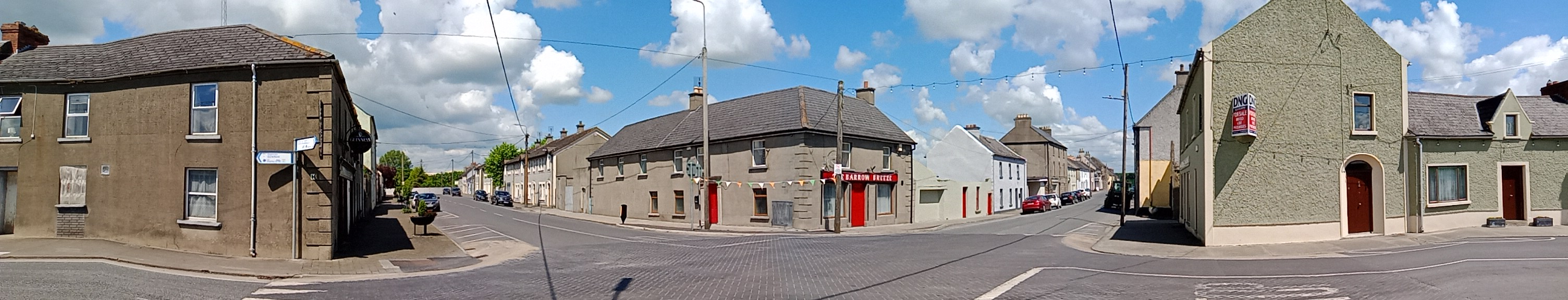
Main streets in Goresbridge

== See also ==
- List of towns and villages in Ireland
- Mount Loftus, the nearby manor house
- Grange Lower, nearby townland
