= Arthur Winton =

Irish doctor

Arthur Winton was surgeon to the Meath Hospital until 1790. He was succeeded by Solomon Richards.
