= York Street, Dublin =

Street in Dublin, Ireland

York Street
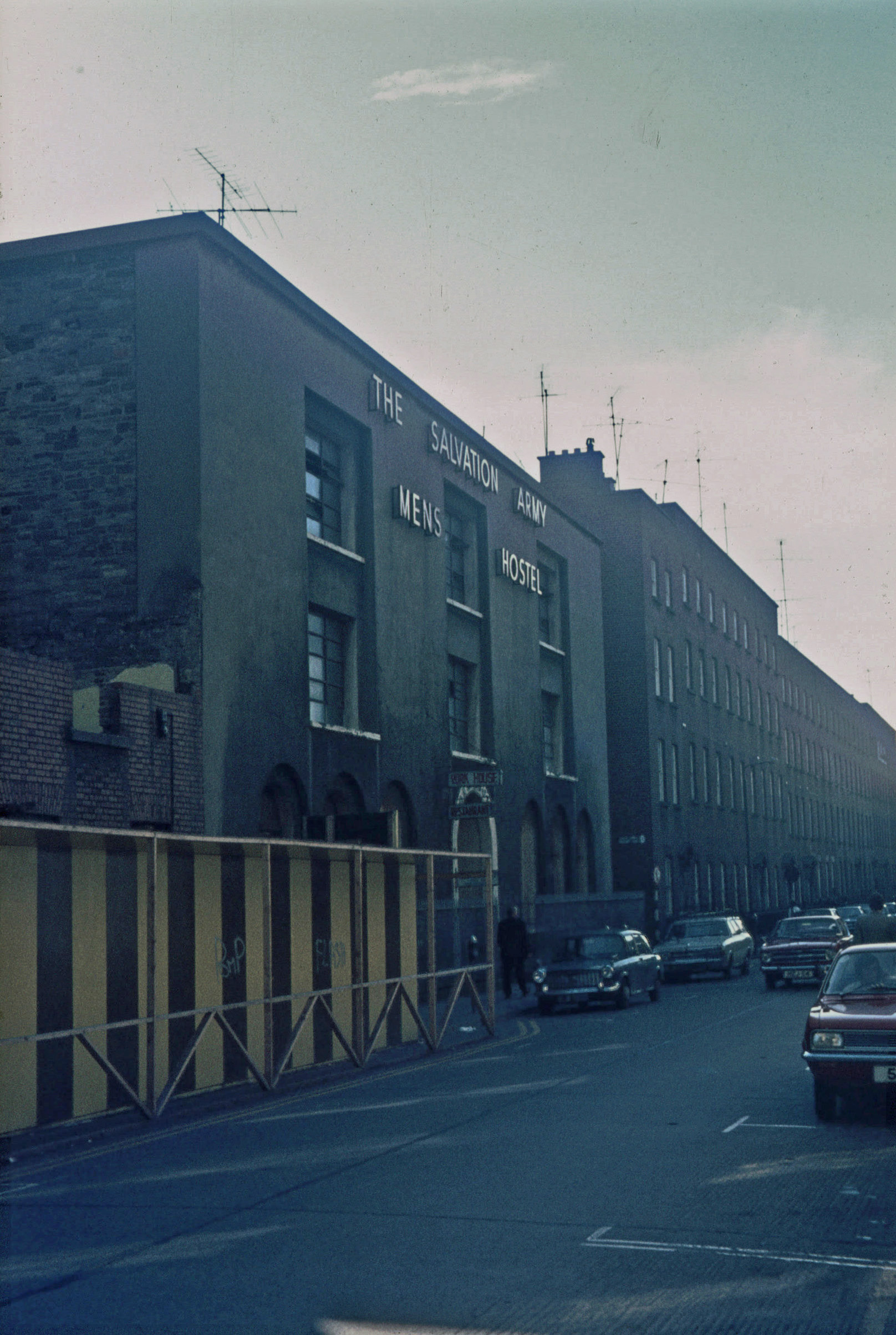
- View of York Street in 1974

- Location within Central Dublin
- Native name: Sráid Eabhraic (Irish)
- Namesake: James, Duke of York
- Length: 290 m (950 ft)
- Width: 15 metres (49 ft)
- Location: Dublin, Ireland
- Postal code: D02
- Coordinates: 53.339170°N 6.263929°W
- west end: Aungier Street
- east end: St Stephen's Green West

Construction
- Completion: c. 1685

Other
- Known for: Royal College of Surgeons in Ireland

York Street (Irish: Sráid Eabhrac) is a street in Dublin in the Republic of Ireland that runs between Aungier Street in the west and St Stephen's Green in the east.

== History ==
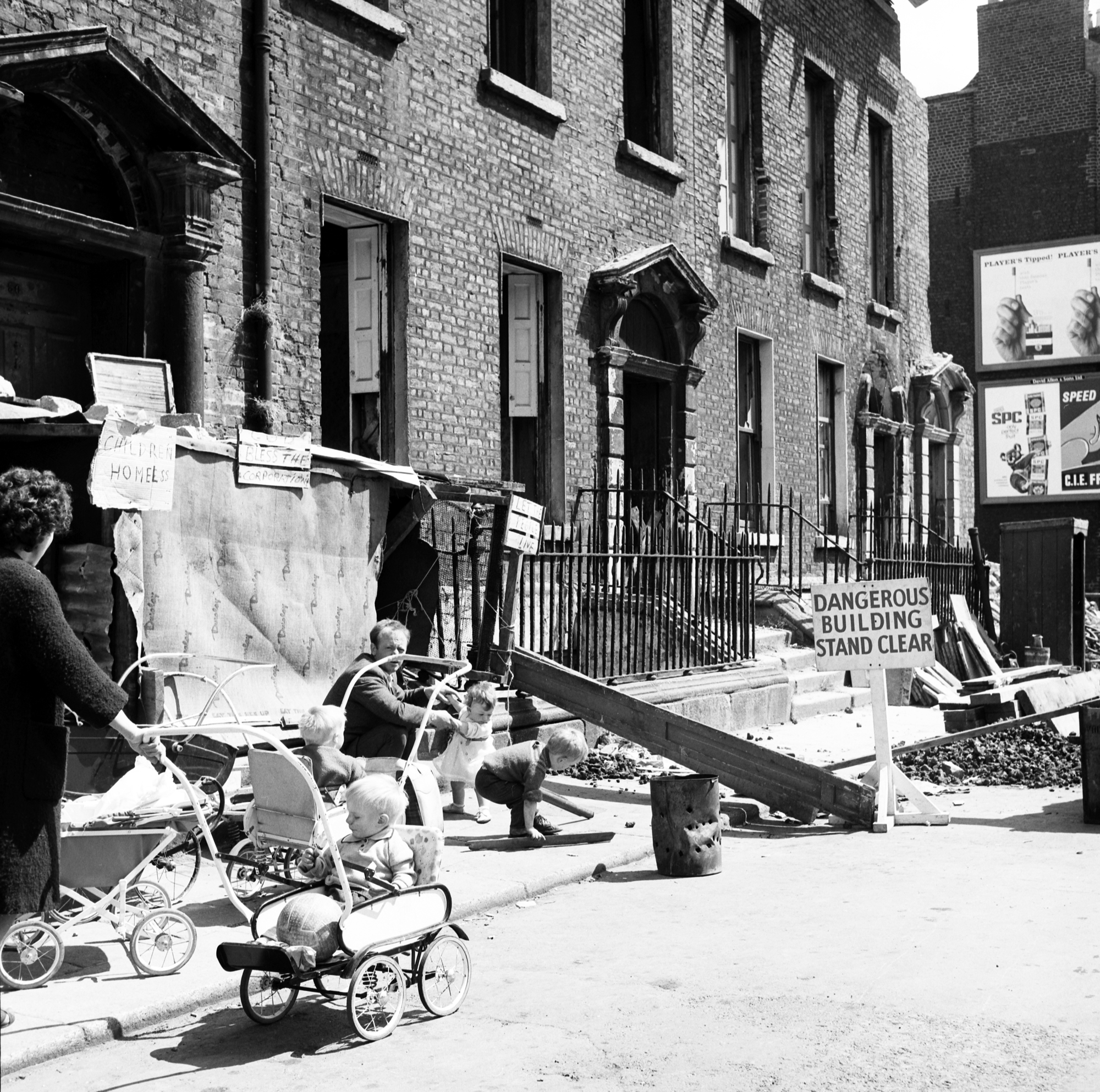
York Street, 1964: a protest against evictions from tenement buildings

It appears on the map around 1685, named after Prince James, Duke of York (later King James II). M'Cready incorrectly states the street is named after Ernest Augustus, Duke of York and Albany (brother of George I), who did not become Duke of York until 1716. The home of the Royal College of Surgeons in Ireland (RCSI) is at the eastern end on the corner with St Stephen's Green and the RCSI's medical education building is at 26 York Street.

There was a Salvation Army Hostel which previously was a Congregational Church or Independent Church which was ministered by the Rev. Dr. William Urwick for 40 years, was on the street.

== Notable residents ==
- Thomas Byrne, Irish-born British Army soldier and winner of the Victoria Cross
- Charles Maturin (1780-1824), Irish Protestant clergyman and writer of Gothic plays and novels, lived on the street from the early 1800s until his death.
- Solomon Richards, four times president of the RCSI, was born there around 1760.
- Cusack Roney (1781-1849), Irish physician and President of the Royal College of Surgeons in Ireland (RCSI) in 1814 and 1828
