= Loftus baronets =

Baronetcy in the Baronetage of Ireland

There have been two baronetcies created for persons with the surname Loftus, both in the Baronetage of Ireland. One creation was extant as of 2008.

The Loftus Baronetcy, of Mount Loftus in the County of Kilkenny, was created in the Baronetage of Ireland on 16 July 1768 for Edward Loftus. The title became extinct on the death of the third Baronet in 1864.

The Tottenham, later Loftus Baronetcy, of Loftus Hall in the County of Wexford, was created in the Baronetage of Ireland on 18 December 1780. For more information on this creation, see the Marquess of Ely.

== Loftus baronets, of Mount Loftus (1768) ==
- Sir Edward Loftus, 1st Baronet (c. 1742–1818)
- Sir Nicholas Loftus, 2nd Baronet (1763–1832)
- Sir Francis Hamilton Loftus, 3rd Baronet (1778–1864)

== Loftus baronets, of Loftus Hall (1780) ==
- see the Marquess of Ely
