= Herbert Rawson =

English footballer and British Army officer

Herbert Edward Rawson CB
- Born: 3 September 1852; Port Louis, British Mauritius
- Died: 18 October 1924 (aged 72); Westminster, London
- Education: Westminster School; Royal Military Academy, Woolwich
- Spouse: Elizabeth Armstrong
- Relatives: Rawson W. Rawson (father); William Rawson (brother)
- Military career
- Allegiance: United Kingdom
- Branch: British Army
- Service years: 1872–1909
- Rank: Colonel
- Unit: Royal Engineers (RE)
- Commands: 27 Company RE (1887–1888); 40 Company RE (1889); RE Lines of Communication, Natal Colony (1901–1902); RE, South Africa (1905–1907); RE, Northern Command (1907–1909)
- Conflicts: Second Boer War (1899–1902); Relief of Ladysmith (1900); Battle of the Tugela Heights (1900); Laing's Nek (1900)
- Awards: Companion of the Order of the Bath; Queen's South Africa Medal; King's South Africa Medal

Colonel Herbert Edward Rawson CB (3 September 1852 – 18 October 1924) was an English British Army officer and footballer who played once for England, and appeared in two FA Cup finals, winning the cup in 1875 as a member of Royal Engineers A.F.C.

Rawson served with the Royal Engineers (RE) in South Africa during the Second Boer War and later commanded the Royal Engineers in the colony. He was later a staff officer commanding the RE in the north of England.

== Early life ==
Rawson was born in Port Louis, British Mauritius, the son of Rawson W. Rawson and his wife Sophia Marianne Ward. His father was Treasurer and Paymaster-general in the colony and went on to serve as Secretary of Cape Colony between 1854 and 1864 and Governor of the Bahamas between 1864 and 1875. Rawson was educated at Westminster School in London, as was his younger brother William. He played cricket whilst at school, playing in the 1st XI in 1869 and 1870 as a wicket-keeper.

== Military career ==
After leaving school he joined the Royal Military Academy, Woolwich and was commissioned into the British Army as a lieutenant in the Royal Engineers in September 1872. He won the Francis Fowke memorial Medal in 1873 and later specialised in under-sea mining operations and was posted to Bermuda in 1877 before being seconded to the Treasury between 1880 and 1884. He was promoted to captain in 1884 before serving on Malta the following year and at Halifax, Nova Scotia between 1885 and 1889, where he commanded 27 (Submarine Mining) Company and 40 (Submarine Mining) Company as well as training local militia in under-sea mining operations. He was Secretary of the Royal Engineers Committee and the War Office Ordnance Committee between 1890 and 1894 and was promoted to major in December 1891, and lieutenant-colonel on 7 July 1899.

After the outbreak of the Second Boer War in October 1899, Rawson was posted to South Africa where he commanded the Royal Engineers lines of communication in Natal Colony. He was part of the force which relieved Ladysmith in March 1900 and saw action at the Battle of the Tugela Heights and Pieter's Hill. After serving in the Transvaal in May and June, where he was at the Battle of Laing's Nek, he was posted back to Natal, spending some time on the Zululand frontier before receiving the brevet rank of colonel in November 1900. He commanded Royal Engineers in the Pietermaritzburg area during the later part of the war. He was mentioned in dispatches several times and awarded the Queen's South Africa Medal with four clasps and the King's South Africa Medal with both clasps.

Following the end of hostilities in June 1902, Rawson left Cape Town on the SS Orissa, which arrived at Southampton in late October 1902. He was appointed a Companion of the Order of the Bath (CB) in the October 1902 South African honours list. On his return he took command of the Royal Engineers in Dublin.

Rawson returned to serve again in South Africa between 1905 and 1907, commanding Royal Engineers in the colony. His rank of colonel was made substantive in 1905 and he went on to serve as RE commander of the Northern Command at York. He retired from the army in September 1909, authoring academic papers in areas of the aeronautics and meteorology during his retirement.

== Football career ==
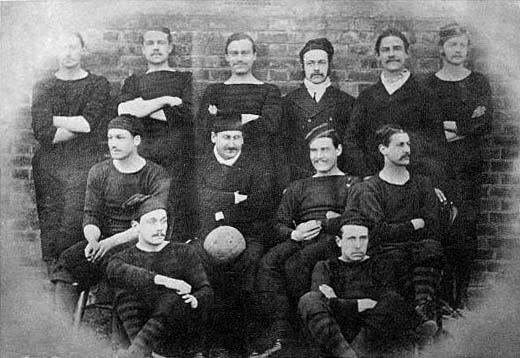
The Royal Engineers team of 1875. Rawson is third from right in the back row.

Rawson played football at Westminster between 1869 and 1871, becoming captain in his final year. After he was commissioned in the Army, he joined the Royal Engineers football club, and was a member of their team which reached the 1874 FA Cup Final, losing 2–0 to Oxford University. His brother William played for the opposition. The following year, the Engineers again reached the final, this time defeating the Old Etonians 2–0 in a replay, after a 1–1 draw in the first match.

Shortly before the 1875 FA Cup Final, Rawson was selected (along with William) for the England team against Scotland. This was the first occasion on which two brothers played for England in the same match. The match ended in a 2–2 draw. He scored five goals in a match for the Engineers in 1875–76 when they beat High Wycombe 0–15.

== Cricket career ==
Herbert Rawson
Cricket information
- Batting: Right-handed
- Role: Wicket-keeper

Domestic team information
- Years: Team
- 1873–1895: Royal Engineers
- 1873: Kent
- Source: CricInfo, 2 August 2020

Rawson was also a cricketer. At school he scored a century against I Zingari and he played for Royal Military Academy, Woolwich and regularly for Royal Engineers when he was serving in the United Kingdom. He was described as "for many years the best wicket-keeper in the Corps", often standing up to the stumps to fast bowling.

In September 1873 he made his only appearance in first-class cricket, playing for Kent County Cricket Club against W. G. Grace's XI at Gravesend. Although he failed to score, he claimed four wickets either from catches or stumpings. He was invited to play in the following year's Canterbury Cricket Week, a major social occasion at the time, but chose to play for the RE in the annual match against the Royal Artillery instead. He continued to play club cricket for the RE until 1893 and played in Canada whilst serving there in the late 1880s. His final significant match was for Marylebone Cricket Club (MCC) in 1897.

== Family and later life ==
Rawson married Elizabeth Armstrong in Dublin in 1875. In later life he lived at Heronsgate in Hertfordshire. He was a Fellow of the Royal Geographical Society, Vice–President of the Royal Meteorological Society and was on the council of the African Royal Aeronautical Society. He died at Westminster in 1924 aged 72.

== Sporting honours ==
Royal Engineers

- FA Cup winner: 1875
- FA Cup finalist: 1874

== See also ==
- List of England international footballers born outside England

== Bibliography ==
- Carlaw, Derek (2020). Kent County Cricketers, A to Z: Part One (1806–1914) (PDF). Cardiff: ACS.
