= Robert MacLaren =

British ophthalmologist

Robert E MacLaren FMedSci FRCOphth FRCS FACS VR
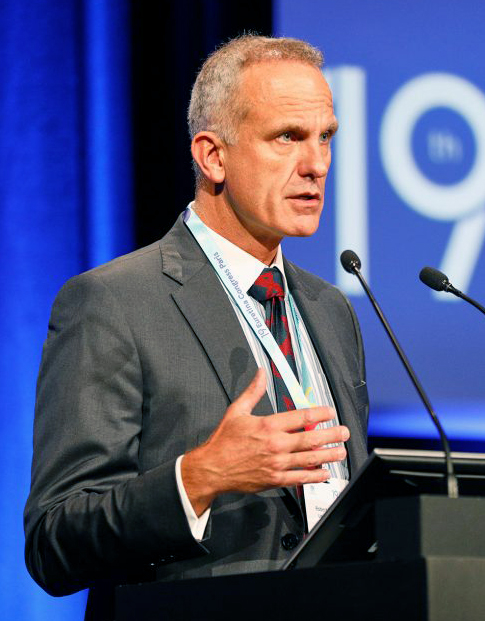
- Born: 14 November 1966 (age 59); Surrey, England
- Education: University of Edinburgh
- Awards: ARVO Camras Award (USA); RP Fighting Blindness Scientist of the Year Award (UK); Percival Hay, Richardson Cross and Jessie Mole Medals (UK)
- Scientific career
- Fields: Ophthalmology
- Workplaces: University of Oxford
- Thesis: Optic Nerve Regeneration (1995)
- Website: ndcn.ox.ac.uk/team/robert-maclaren

Robert E. MacLaren is a British ophthalmologist who has led pioneering work in the treatment of blindness caused by diseases of the retina. He is Professor of Ophthalmology at the University of Oxford and Honorary Professor of Ophthalmology at the UCL Institute of Ophthalmology. He is a Consultant Ophthalmologist at the Oxford Eye Hospital. He is also an Honorary Consultant Vitreo-retinal Surgeon at Moorfields Eye Hospital. MacLaren is an NIHR Senior Investigator, or lead researcher, for the speciality of Ophthalmology. In addition, he is a member of the research committee of Euretina: the European Society of Retina specialists, Fellow of Merton College, in Oxford and a Fellow of the Higher Education Academy.

== Early life ==
Diagram illustrating optic nerve regeneration or whole eye transplantation in amphibia. From MacLaren RE (1995) DPhil thesis, University of Oxford.

Robert MacLaren was born on 14 November 1966, at Epsom in Surrey. His father was a photographer, which prompted an early interest in optics. MacLaren was educated at Angmering School and Chichester College, before training at the University of Edinburgh Medical School, from 1985 to 1990, where he graduated with a Bachelor of Medicine and a Bachelor of Surgery. MacLaren then earned an academic doctorate, between 1992 and 1995, at the University of Oxford.

== Ophthalmology ==
MacLaren was appointed Professor of Ophthalmology at the University of Oxford in March 2009. In February of the same year, he was made Honorary Professor of Ophthalmology at the UCL Institute of Ophthalmology. He has been a Fellow of the Royal College of Ophthalmologists (FRCOphth) since June 2003.

MacLaren is a professor in the Nuffield Laboratory of Ophthalmology (NLO), the academic ophthalmology section of Oxford University's Nuffield Department of Clinical Neurosciences, which is part of the Medical Sciences Division and based in the John Radcliffe Hospital.

MacLaren is described as 'one of the stars' of the developing inter-disciplinary field of ophthalmic translational medicine. This combines practical skills in eye surgery with clinical academic application in research, to investigate the diseases of the eye 'from bench to bedside': aiming to improve patient outcomes, at least by arresting or slowing the progress of a disease, or – ideally – by reversing the effects, partially or totally. Once the processes of the diseases are understood, new surgical technologies are furthering the options for a surgical solution and new ophthalmic technologies have created a variety of implants, such as electronic retinal devices for prosthesis. Furthermore, the enhanced precision of surgery allows additional interventions, with the application of gene therapy and stem-cell therapy to retinal dystrophies (inherited conditions).

== Surgery ==
Diagram showing the position of the electronic retinal implant at back of the eye and the cable connecting it to the external power supply under the skin behind the ear.

MacLaren has been a Consultant Ophthalmic Surgeon for the Oxford University Hospitals NHS Foundation Trust (OUH) since March 2009. His surgical work is based largely at the Oxford Eye Hospital and the Nuffield Laboratory of Ophthalmology [NLO], both located within the John Radcliffe Hospital, on Headington Hill in Oxford. He has also been Honorary Consultant Vitreoretinal Surgeon at Moorfields Eye Hospital NHS Foundation Trust, in London, since May 2006.

He has been a Fellow of the Royal College of Surgeons of Edinburgh (RCSEd) since July 1998 and was awarded their annual King James IV Professorship in 2007.

He is one of the first surgeons in the world to have made a successful retinal implant for visual prosthesis, sometimes described as creating: a 'bionic eye'. He is also a pioneer in robot-assisted surgery for ophthalmic operations. Key events of his work at the Moorfields and John Radcliffe hospitals include:

2007 World's First Retinal Gene-Therapy Surgery

MacLaren was the assistant surgeon to James Bainbridge and helped perform the world's first retinal gene therapy treatment. The operation was carried out at Moorfields in London. The patient was Robert Johnson, a young man with Leber's Congenital Amaurosis (LCA). A faulty gene in the pigment layer, RPE65, prevented his photoreceptor cells from working, so a valid copy of the gene was implanted in one eye to 'patch' the blind-spot and restore function. The delicate operation required passing a needle through the eye, to lift the retina and insert the new gene-copy in the pigment layer.

2011 Choroideremia Gene Therapy Trial

This trial was funded by the Health Innovation Challenge Fund and the Oxford (OUH) BRC. It addressed the progress of the disease choroideremia, or choroideraemia, in which a faulty gene, CHM, leads to a loss of REP1 protein, affecting the retinal pigment epithelium (RPE) and causing progressive loss of vision. On 24 November 2011, Jonathan Wyatt, a Bristol barrister, received a 'good copy' of the REP1 gene, administered through an adeno-associated virus (AAV) – serotype 2 (AAV2) – as a vector, in fluid under the retina. By 2016, the results of the trial appeared both 'promising and lasting' and further work was authorised, with a view to seeing whether the process could eventually be applied to more common conditions, such as age-related macular degeneration (AMD).

2012/2015 Electronic Retinal Implant Trials

These trials, funded by the NIHR and the Oxford (OUH) BRC, tested the ability of an electronic retina to replace a retina that has become damaged, a development common in patients with the hereditary condition retinitis pigmentosa (RP). The implants were developed by German company Retina Implant AG. The devices also require a power-plant to be inserted behind the ear, in the manner of a cochlear implant.

The pilot-trial of 22 March 2012 tested the Alpha IMS device. The supporting power-plant procedure was carried out by surgeon James Ramsden with Markus Groppe. The main operation was undertaken, at Oxford, by MacLaren with Tim Jackson, consultant surgeon at Kings College Hospital. The patient was Chris James, a council-worker from Wiltshire. MacLaren suggested that if the trial were successful, an electronic retina could become standard for patients with retinitis pigmentosa (RP). He warned that current devices were not suitable to treat age-related macular degeneration (AMD) or diseases of the optic-nerve, such as glaucoma. The following week, Jackson, with MacLaren, operated on Robin Millar, a music-producer, in London; another four UK patients also received the device during that year.

On 8 June 2015, the improved Alpha AMS device was implanted in the first patient, again with MacLaren carrying out the procedure, in Oxford.

2016 Robot-Assisted Surgery Trial

In the past, retinal diseases of the eye could be monitored to microscopic level – using laser scanners and microscopes – but interventions were not possible because the delicate nature of the eye meant that surgical operations were beyond the physiological limits of the human hand. On 9 September 2016, operating at the John Radcliffe Hospital in Oxford, MacLaren and Thomas Edwards performed the world's first robot-assisted operation inside the eye. The patient was William Beaver, a local priest.

This operation was described as the 'R2D2 Trial', because it was testing the safety and efficacy of the Robotic Retinal-Dissection Device (R2D2), developed by Dutch firm Preceyes BV (pronounced: precise!). The operation involved lifting off a damaged membrane, 100th millimetre thick, from the retina, at the back of the eye; the robot's tolerance, however, would have allowed work to 1000th millimetre. The operation proved the efficacy of the new technologies available, allowing the possibility of exploiting their potential to new scientific and a medical ends: MacLaren said that with robotic systems, a whole new chapter of eye surgery had just begun.

2017 X-linked Retinitis Pigmentosa Gene Therapy Trial

Mutations in the X-linked RPGR gene are the most common cause of severe sight loss in retinitis pigmentosa. The RPGR gene contains a highly repetitive sequence of purine bases in the DNA with a large section comprising almost exclusively Guanine or Adenine nucleotides, which made it very difficult to clone it for gene therapy. Using a form of gene editing known as codon-optimisation, MacLaren and members of his research team were able to engineer a stable version of RPGR that was expressed highly efficiently in an AAV vector. This led to the first gene therapy trial for X-linked retinitis pigmentosa sponsored by Nightstar and with MacLaren as the surgeon.

== Research ==
The Oxford NIHR Biomedical Research Centre (OxBRC) is, as evidenced by NIHR funding allocation, one of England and the UK's leading centres for medical research. It is sometimes styled 'Oxford (OUH) NIHR BRC' since the establishment of a second BRC in Oxford: the Oxford Health NIHR BRC. The OxBRC's NHS Host is the Oxford University Hospitals NHS Trust, where MacLaren is a Consultant Ophthalmologist and its Academic Partner is the University of Oxford, where MacLaren is also Professor of Ophthalmology. Additionally, in 2016, the NIHR appointed MacLaren to be a senior investigator, or lead researcher, for the speciality of ophthalmology.

Between March 2001 and April 2006, MacLaren was a Resident Clinical Research Fellow at the Moorfields Eye Hospital NHS Trust, in London. He was then a faculty member and a founding research-theme leader in the Moorfields – UCL Institute of Ophthalmology Biomedical Research Centre, which was then the specialist BRC for Ophthalmology.

His current clinical and laboratory research efforts focus on the forms of blindness which are to date incurable. By understanding the causes of retinal degeneration, it may be possible to slow, arrest or ameliorate the processes. The ultimate aim is then to reverse such effects and to restore working vision. The research efforts concentrate on two areas of the eye in particular: the retinal pigment epithelium (RPE), and the photoreceptors. The NLO Clinical Ophthalmology Research Group ('the MacLaren Group') is looking at replacement methods for each, and for both, to improve patient outcomes. Electronic retinal implants have already been trialled to treat retinitis pigmentosa, and trials are now being conducted to treat choroideremia through gene-therapy: implanting missing or faulty genes to correct retinal dystrophies (inherited conditions).

As well as retinal issues, research is undertaken to improve outcomes for conditions relating to the lens and to the optic nerve, such as improved intra-ocular lenses (IOL) for cataract operations and therapies for glaucoma.

== Teaching ==
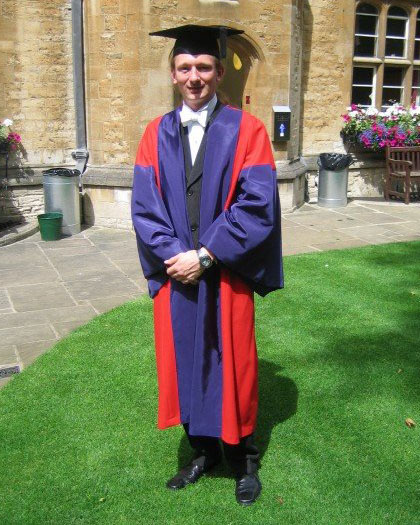
Oxford University DPhil, in full academicals.

In addition to his other duties, MacLaren has a full programme of teaching and tutoring. He is formally qualified, with a Postgraduate Diploma in Learning and Teaching in Higher Education (PGDipLATHE) from 2006. He has been a Fellow of the Higher Education Academy since June 2003.

As a Bodley Fellow – the active staff of the college – at Merton, since October 2007, he is a stipendiary lecturer in human anatomy. He has held weekly tutorials in medical sciences for undergraduates since 1992: anatomy, genetics and cell biology for Year 1, and neuroanatomy and visual neuroscience for year 2; third year FHS topics relate to gene therapy, stem cells or visual neuroscience.

As a mentor at the Academy of Medical Sciences, he supervises clinical academics. He also supervises junior doctors training in ophthalmic surgery and DPhil research students.

== Business ==
In 2014, with Oxford University, he co-founded the private bio-technology company NightstaRx Ltd., also known Nightstar, in which he remains a director, and which is based at the offices of the Wellcome Trust in London.

The technology spin-out was developed with Oxford Innovation, Ltd. and Syncona Ltd. and the clinical-stage company now is backed by Syncona, NEA venture capital and Oxford Science Equity-Management (OSEM). The company has received four rounds of funding, including its IPO on NASDAQ in September 2017.

== Military ==
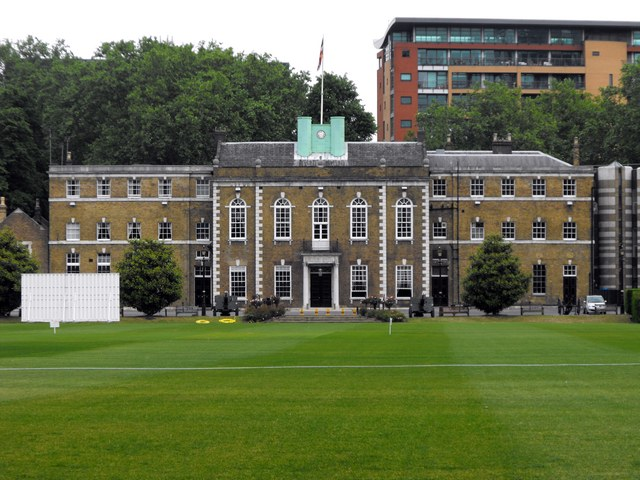
the grounds of the HAC, Armoury House

MacLaren was also a commissioned officer in Group A – the units intended for operational service – of the Territorial Army, now Army Reserve, of the British Army. As a qualified doctor, he served as a Medical Officer (MO) in the Royal Army Medical Corps. He achieved the rank of major before retiring from military service in 2012.

MacLaren was posted to the Honourable Artillery Company (HAC) and, in due course, became the Surgeon-Major: the Regimental Medical Officer (RMO). The term Surgeon-Major applied to all the unit's RMOs, most of whom were in General Practice (GP), and it was coincidental that Major MacLaren was primarily an occupational surgeon. Major MacLaren also served as locum RMO to the Household Cavalry Mounted Regiment, at Knightsbridge in London.

In addition to serving as an RMO, Major MacLaren volunteered for an operational tour, in the former Yugoslavia, engaged in the field of military medicine, as part of 1st Mechanised Brigade, with case-work based more on occupational injury and trauma medicine, rather than disease and genetics.

Having served as a member of the Volunteer Reserves for more than a decade, Major MacLaren, RAMC qualified for the post-nominals: VR.

== Family life ==
Robert MacLaren is married with three children: two boys and a girl. He is the grandson of the lawyer Robert Edwin Newbery MC, great-great grandson of the Victorian actor/playwright James Roland MacLaren and great-great-great grandson of the engineer Sampson Moore.

== Honours and awards ==
- 2005: Royal Society of Medicine prize meeting in ophthalmology.
- 2005: Oxford Ophthalmological Congress Founder's Cup and medal.
- 2007: Royal College of Surgeons of Edinburgh (RCSEd) King James IV 'Professorship' – a surgery prize with the courtesy title of professor for a year: this award was the first to be designated for ophthalmology.
- 2013: Association for Research in Vision and Ophthalmology (ARVO) Foundation for Eye Research: Pfizer Ophthalmics-sponsored award in memory of Carl B. Camras for work on Translational Research (TR), or 'Pfizer Camras Transitional Research Award'.
- 2018: Fellowship of the Academy of Medical Sciences

== Selected publications ==
=== Medical textbook ===
- MacLaren, RE (2009). Learning and Teaching in Human Anatomy Applying current theories in educational research to medical student learning. Saarbrücken: VDM Verlag Dr. Müller. p. 68. ISBN 978-3639140538.

=== Papers ===
- MacLaren RE, Fischer MD, Gow JA, Lam BL, Sankila EK, Girach A, Panda S, Yoon D, Zhao G, Pennesi ME (2023). "Subretinal timrepigene emparvovec in adult men with choroideremia: a randomized phase 3 trial" Nature Medicine. 29 (10): 2464-2472. doi.org/10.1038/s41591-023-02520-3. PMC PMC10579095. PMID 37814062.
- Cehajic-Kapetanovic, J; Xue, K; Martinez-Fernandez de la Camara, C; Nanda, A; Davies, A; Wood, LJ; Salvetti, AP; Fischer, MD; Aylward, JW; Barnard, AR; Jolly, JK; Luo, E; Lujan, BJ; Ong, T; Girach, A; Black, GCM; Gregori, NZ; Davis, JL; Rosa, PR; Lotery, AJ; Lam, BL; Stanga, PE; MacLaren, RE (2020). "Initial results from a first-in-human gene therapy trial on X-linked retinitis pigmentosa caused by mutations in RPGR". Nature Medicine. 26 (3): 354–359. doi:10.1038/s41591-020-0763-1. PMC 7104347. PMID 32094925.
- Xue, K; Jolly, JK; Barnard, AR; Rudenko, A; Salvetti, AP; Patrício, MI; Edwards, TL; Groppe, M; Orlans, HO; Tolmachova, T; Black, GC; Webster, AR; Lotery, AJ; Holder, GE; Downes, SM; Seabra, MC; MacLaren, RE (2018). "Beneficial effects on vision in patients undergoing retinal gene therapy for choroideremia". Nature Medicine. 24 (10): 1507–1512. doi:10.1038/s41591-018-0185-5. PMC 7032956. PMID 30297895.
- Edwards, TL; Xue, K; Meenink, HCM; Beelen, MJ; Naus, GJL; Simunovic, MP; Latasiewicz, M; Farmery, AD; de Smet, MD; MacLaren, RE (2018). "First-in-human study of the safety and viability of intraocular robotic surgery". Nature Biomedical Engineering. 2 (9): 649–656. doi:10.1038/s41551-018-0248-4. PMC 6155489. PMID 30263872.
- Edwards, TL; Cottriall, CL; Xue, K; Simunovic, MP; Ramsden, JD; Zrenner, E; MacLaren, RE (2018). "Assessment of the Electronic Retinal Implant Alpha AMS in Restoring Vision to Blind Patients with End-Stage Retinitis Pigmentosa". Ophthalmology. 125 (3): 432–443. doi:10.1016/j.ophtha.2017.09.019. PMC 5818267. PMID 29110946.*
- Singh, MS; Charbel Issa, P; Butler, R; Martin, C; Lipinski, DM; Sekaran, S; Barnard, AR; MacLaren, RE (2013). "Reversal of end-stage retinal degeneration and restoration of visual function by photoreceptor transplantation". Proceedings of the National Academy of Sciences of the United States of America. 110 (3): 1101–6. Bibcode:2013PNAS..110.1101S. doi:10.1073/pnas.1119416110. PMC 3549087. PMID 23288902.*
- MacLaren, RE; Pearson, RA; MacNeil, A; Douglas, RH; Salt, TE; Akimoto, M; Swaroop, A; Sowden, JC; Ali, RR (2006). "Retinal repair by transplantation of photoreceptor precursors". Nature. 444 (7116): 203–7. Bibcode:2006Natur.444..203M. doi:10.1038/nature05161. hdl:2027.42/62596. PMID 17093405. S2CID 4415311.*
