= Oxford Ophthalmological Congress =

The Oxford Ophthalmological Congress (OOC) is an annual meeting of ophthalmic surgeons at the University of Oxford.

Established in 1909, the Congress is the longest running continuous gathering in the United Kingdom of ophthalmic surgeons. Until recently it was also the largest and is now second only to the expanded Congress of the Royal College of Ophthalmologists itself. It brings together some 450 representatives each year.

The results of the conference are summarized in the British Journal of Ophthalmology. and also, where useful to the wider profession, in the British Medical Journal.

== History ==
In 1902, Robert Walter Doyne was appointed the first Reader in Ophthalmology at the University of Oxford. The post was inaugurated thanks to a benefaction from Mrs. Margaret Ogilvie. Doyne held the chair for 11 years and was also consulting ophthalmic surgeon to the Radcliffe Infirmary in Oxford. He later founded the Oxford Eye Hospital.

In 1904 he was the lead representative for Ophthalmology at the annual meeting of the British Medical Association (BMA), which was held at Oxford in the summer. This programme was such a success that he was asked to arrange a similar meeting the following year and this then became a regular event each summer.

As a result, the Oxford Ophthalmological Congress was formally established in 1909, and Doyne was appointed its first Master the following year.

In 2014 Parul Desai became the first woman to be appointed Master, with the original title being maintained.

== Programme ==
The Congress is a 3-day colloquium, held each July in Oxford in England, at which leading practitioners give talks on issues of interest to the profession. The main event of the Congress is the Doyne Memorial Lecture, but there are, in addition, opportunities for a number of quick-fire presentations, allowing newcomers to introduce themselves and their projects to a distinguished gathering of professional colleagues. The Founder's Cup is awarded for the best presentation and the Ian Fraser Cup is the other main award. The evenings are for socialising: an opportunity to catch up with old colleagues from other universities and hospitals, and a chance for the present and the future of the profession to meet each other.

== Prizes ==
The Founder's Cup and the Ian Fraser Cup are the principal prizes awarded at the Congress, recognizing outstanding presentations by British-trained ophthalmology trainees.

Founder's Cup

- 2005: Robert MacLaren: Cup and medal - now Professor
- 2011: Mandeep Singh: Cup and medal - now Professor
- 2013: Mandeep Singh: Cup (bis) - (see above)
- 2014: Samantha de Silva
- 2015: Alun Barnard
- 2016: Sofia Theodoropoulou
- 2017: George Cook
- 2018: Harry Orlans
- 2019: Imran Mohammed
- 2020: Cancelled - COVID-19
- 2021: Liying Low
- 2022: Simona Degli Esposti
- 2023: Aiman Dilnawaz

Ian Fraser Cup:

- 2014: Naz Raouff
- 2015: Paul Flavahan
- 2016: Matthew Edmunds
- 2017: Kanmin Xue
- 2018: Minak Bhalla
- 2019: Neda Minakaran
- 2020: Cancelled - COVID-19
- 2021: Susan Mollan
- 2022: Hong Kai Lim
- 2023: Shabnam Raji
