= Maud Stepney Rawson =

- Born: 13 August 1864; Pune
- Died: 1932 (aged 67–68)
- Occupation: Writer
- Spouse(s): William Rawson
- Parent(s): James George Fife

Maud Stepney Rawson (13 August 1864 – 1932) was a British historical novelist.

She was born Alice Maud Fife in 1865 in Pune, the third daughter of Lieutenant Gen. James George Fife, RE and Katharine Alice Wharton. In 1891, she married William Stepney Rawson. She wrote 18 novels, mostly historical romance. These included A Lady of the Regency (1901), set around 1820 in England, and Journeyman Love (1902), set in 19th century Paris. She also wrote the biographical works Bess of Hardwick and Her Circle (1910) and Penelope Rich and Her Circle (1911).

== Bibliography ==
- A Lady of the Regency. 1 vol. London: Hutchinson, 1900.
- The Apprentice, London: Hutchinson & Co, 1904.
- Journeyman Love. London: Archibald Constable & Co., 1905.
- Tales of Rye Town. London: Archibald Constable & Co., 1905.
- The Labourer's Comedy. 1910.
- The Enchanted Garden. London: Methuen & Co., 1907.
- The Easy Go Luckies, or One Way of Living. London: Methuen & Co., 1908.
- Happiness. London: Methuen & Co., 1909.
- The Stairway of Honour. London: Mills & Boon, 1909.
- Bess of Hardwick and Her Circle. London: Hutchinson & Co, 1910.
- Penelope Rich and Her Circle. London: Hutchinson & Co, 1911.
- Splendid Zipporah. London: Methuen & Co., 1911.
- The Years' Round. London: Mills & Boon, 1911.
- The Three Anarchists. London, Stanley Paul & Co., 1912.
- The Watered Garden. London, Stanley Paul & Co., 1913.
- The Priceless Thing. London, Stanley Paul & Co., 1914.
- Morlac of Gascony. London: Hutchinson & Co, 1915.
- The Magic Gate. London: Hutchinson & Co, 1917.
- Adventures at Rye Town. London: Stanley Paul & Co., 1925.
