= William Rawson =

English footballer (1854–1932)

- Born: 14 October 1854; Cape Town, South Africa
- Died: 4 November 1932 (aged 78); Whitchurch, Oxfordshire, England
- Education: Westminster School, Christ Church, Oxford
- Occupations: Footballer; Football referee Schoolteacher; Businessman
- Known for: The FA Committee member
- Spouse: Alica Maud Fife (m. 1891)
- Father: Rawson W. Rawson
- Relatives: Herbert Rawson (brother)
Association football career
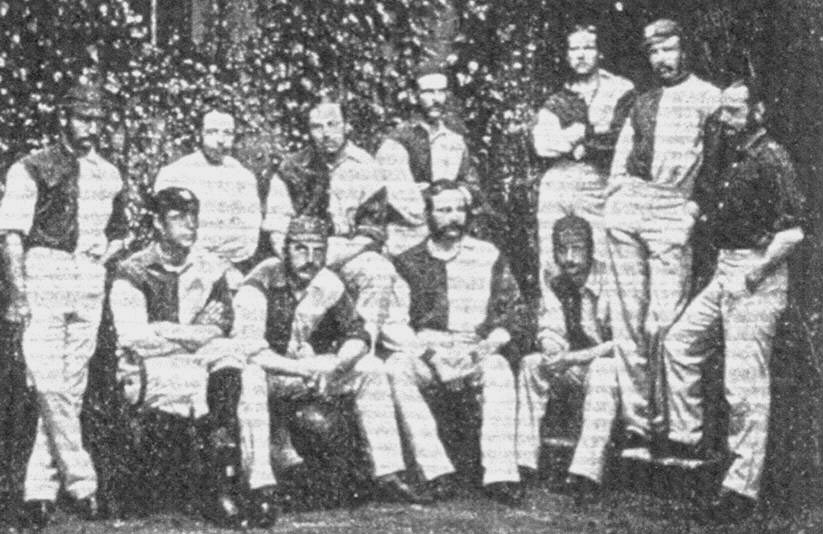
Senior career*
Years	Team	Apps	(Gls)
1873–1877	Oxford University		
- Old Westminsters
- Wanderers
International career
1875–1877	England	2	(0)
- * Club domestic league appearances and goals

William Stepney Rawson (14 October 1854 – 4 November 1932) was an amateur footballer who played at full-back in the 1870s, and was also an FA Cup Final referee in 1876. Born in Cape Colony, he played for the England national team.

== Early life and sports career ==
Rawson was born in Cape Town, South Africa, the son of Rawson W. Rawson and Sophia Mary Anne Ward. He attended Westminster School in London, representing the school at "soccer" in 1872 and 1873, becoming captain in his final year.

He then went up to Christ Church, Oxford, in 1873, winning a "blue" in four consecutive years, from 1874 to 1877. Academically he graduated as BA in 1877 and was awarded MA in 1880.

He became the first player born in Africa to appear in an FA Cup final when he played in the 1874 FA Cup Final for Oxford University – in the match, played against the Royal Engineers at the Kennington Oval on 14 March 1874, the university were the victors by 2 goals to 0. His brother Herbert played for the opposition.

He made his debut for the England football team on 6 March 1875 again at The Oval, in a game against Scotland, which finished 2–2. His brother Herbert won his only cap alongside him in this fixture. This was the first occasion on which two brothers played for England in the same match.

As a referee, he was awarded the 1876 FA Cup Final between the Wanderers and Old Etonians, also at The Oval, which was undecided when the first match ended 1–1 after extra time on 11 March 1876. Wanderers eventually triumphed 3–0 in the replay on 18 March 1876.

On 3 March 1877, he was honoured with the captaincy of the international side, once more against Scotland, and once again at The Oval, in a match which the Scots won 3–1. He collected just the two international caps for England.

He was on the losing side in the 1877 FA Cup Final – the match at The Oval on 24 March was won by the Wanderers 2–1 against Oxford University.

During his career, he also played for Old Westminsters and Wanderers. He served on the FA committee from 1876 to 1877 and again in 1879.

== Career outside sport ==
At the 1881 census, Rawson was a schoolmaster, and lodging in Bridge Street, Brecnock St. David, Wales. He next joined the family electrical engineering business that later became Mabor Ltd, of which he was managing director by 1903.

== Home life ==
In 1891 Rawson married Alice Maud Fife, who was later an author under the name of Maud Stepney Rawson. Having lived in London at the previous census, he was living at Streatley, Berkshire in 1911. He died at Whitchurch, Oxfordshire on 4 November 1932 aged seventy-eight.

== Sporting honours ==
Oxford University

- FA Cup: 1874; finalist: 1877

Referee

- FA Cup Final: 1876

== See also ==
- List of England international footballers born outside England

== References and notes ==
Preceded by Charles W. Alcock	FA Cup Final Referee; 1876	Succeeded by S. H. Wright
