= Sir Robert Doyne =

Irish barrister and politician

Sir Robert Doyne (1651–1733) was an Irish barrister and politician.

== Judge ==
He was member of the Irish House of Commons for New Ross from 1692 to 1695, and later a distinguished judge who served as Chief Baron of the Irish Exchequer from 1695 to 1703 and Chief Justice of the Irish Common Pleas from 1703 to 1714. He regularly attended the Irish House of Lords to give legal advice, and in late 1696 when the office of Lord Chancellor of Ireland fell vacant, he was one of the unsuccessful candidates for the position.

In 1714, on the Queen's death, like all senior judges in Ireland appointed by Queen Anne, he was removed by the new administration. While allegations of corruption were made against him, his removal seems to have been a simple matter of his political allegiance. On the most contentious charge against him, concerning his role and the role of the judiciary generally in the bitter dispute between central government and Dublin Corporation, which had brought public affairs to a virtual standstill in 1713–14, Doyne told the Commons in 1716 that he had acted as he was advised to by others. Although the House of Commons passed a resolution that he had acted corruptly, no further action was taken against him, and his loyalty to the House of Hanover was never seriously questioned.

== Later years ==
He lived in peaceful retirement for many years. He bought Wells House, County Wexford, from the Warren family about 1702: the Doynes lived there until 1964, and built the present house in the 1830s. Doyne also had a Dublin house at Ormond Quay, where he died in 1733. He was buried in the Church of St. Nicholas Within, Dublin.

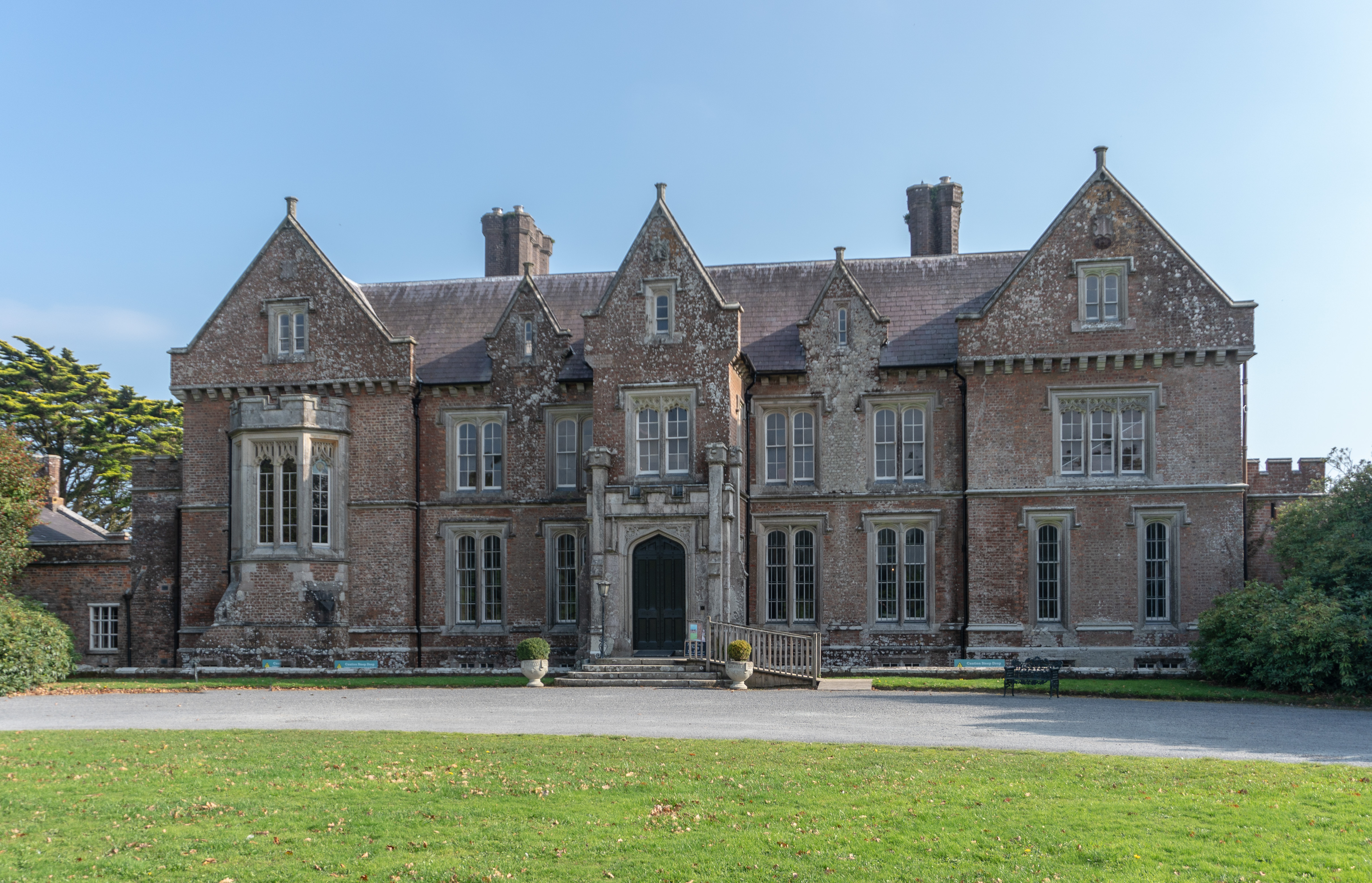
Wells House, County Wexford: Sir Robert bought the original house which this replaced, c.1702

== Family ==
He was born in Dublin, the eldest son of Michael Doyne and his wife Bridget, originally from County Antrim, and educated at Trinity College Dublin. He was called to the Bar in 1677. He entered the King's Inns in 1677, became a Bencher, and was witnessing charters on behalf of the Inns as late as 1731, just two years before his death.

In 1684 he married Jane, widow of Joseph Saunders and daughter of the wealthy lawyer and politician Henry Whitfield and his wife Hester Temple, who died in 1712. They had six children, four sons and two daughters, including Philip (1685–1753), the eldest son and heir, who inherited Wells. Philip by three marriages had at least eight children, including Robert Doyne, MP for Wexford 1753–54, and the Very Reverend Charles Doyne, Dean of Leighlin from 1765 to 1777. Later descendants included the eminent ophthalmologist Robert Walter Doyne (1857–1916).

Sir Robert is mentioned in Teague Land: or A Merry Ramble to the Wild Irish (1698) and was a descendant of Rory Ó Duinn, lord of Úi Riagán in Laois. His branch of the family successfully made the transition from Gaelic-Irish to Anglo-Irish culture, and were based at Brittas. A lawsuit concerning earlier generations of the family is preserved in The O Doyne Manuscript, which offers unique insight into Gaelic-Irish land use.

In 1698 the Irish-born publisher and author John Dunton gave a favourable picture of the Irish judiciary, including Doyne: "men whose reputation is such that no one complains of them".

== Notes ==
Legal offices
Preceded by Richard Cox	Chief Justice of the Irish Common Pleas; 1703–1714	Succeeded by John Forster
