= Mount Loftus =

Country estate in County Kilkenny, Ireland

Coordinates: 52.6039°N 6.9835°W

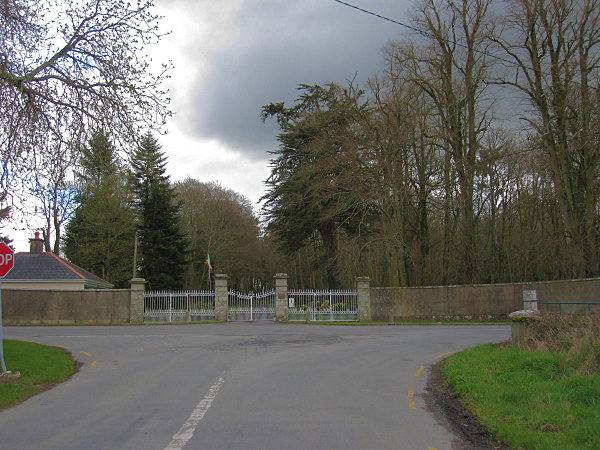
Mount Loftus gates

Mount Loftus is a country estate in the civil parish of Powerstown in County Kilkenny, Ireland. It was originally home to the Loftus baronets, the baronetcy being extinct since the death of the third baronet in 1864. The original 18th century manor house was demolished in 1906. The current house on the estate, built in the early 20th century, was rebuilt from staff accommodations after a fire in the 1930s. This house, and several of its outbuildings, are included on Kilkenny County Council's Record of Protected Structures.

== History ==
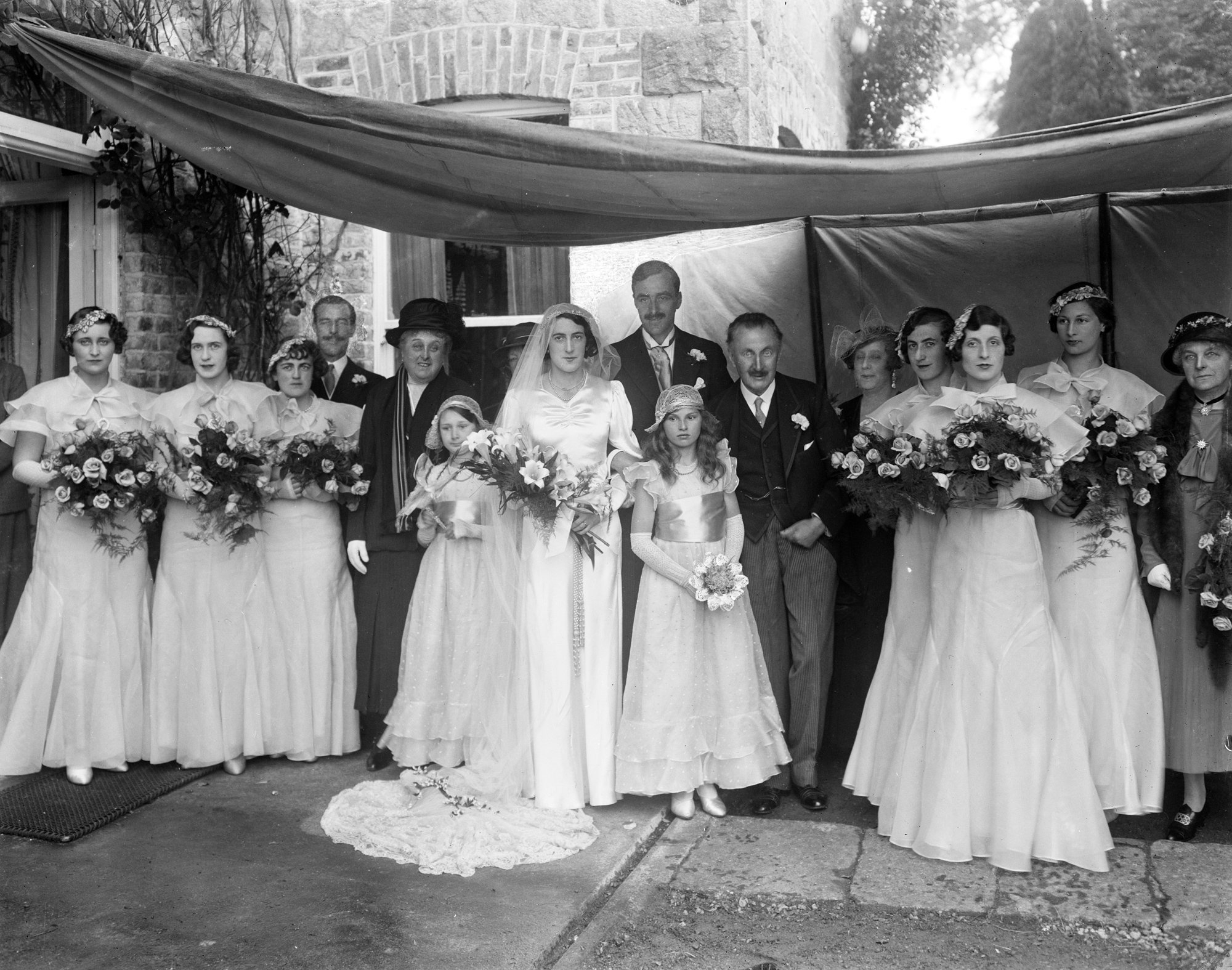
A wedding, involving members of the Grattan-Bellew and Loftus families, at Mount Loftus in the 1930s

Mount Loftus, near Goresbridge, is a 53-acre (21 ha) property in the townland of Mountloftus. The original estate house at Mount Loftus was built in 1750 by the first Viscount Loftus. In 1906, that house was demolished and a smaller house built in its place. This building was destroyed by fire in 1934, but the servants' wing was saved and built up to become the present house.

The current house, originally the staff wing of the larger manor house, contains six bedrooms and has a number of outbuildings. When offered for sale in 2001, the owners were described as horse trainers who, when they bought the property, refurbished the 11 stone-built stables and created guest accommodation for staff and visitors. Other structures on the site include a set of entrance gates, built in 1906, and a walled garden which was redesigned by landscape gardener Angela Jupe.

Also located on the estate are the ruins of a tower house, known as Drumroe Castle, which dates to at least the 16th century and was historically associated with the Kavanagh family. Described in Kilkenny's Record of Protected Structures as "fragmentary", the tower house was used for a period as a dovecote. It is largely demolished with the stone reputedly used in the construction of other buildings on the estate.

== See also ==
- Loftus Hall, County Wexford
