= Rawson W. Rawson =

British statistician

Sir Rawson William Rawson KCMG CB

Governor of Barbados and the Windward Islands
- In office 1868–1875
- Preceded by: Sir James Walker
- Succeeded by: Sanford Freeling (acting)

Governor of the Bahamas
- In office 1864–1869
- Preceded by: Charles John Bayley
- Succeeded by: Sir James Walker

Colonial Secretary for the Cape Colony
- In office 9 May 1854 – 21 July 1864
- Governor: Sir George Grey; Sir Philip Wodehouse
- Succeeded by: Richard Southey

Personal details
- Born: 8 September 1812 London, United Kingdom
- Died: 20 November 1899 (aged 87) London, United Kingdom
- Spouse: Mary-Anne Ward (m. 1849)
- Children: 8 including Herbert Rawson and William Rawson
- Parents: Sir William Rawson (father); Jane Rawson (mother)
- Education: Eton College
- Occupation: British government official and statistician

Sir Rawson William Rawson, KCMG, CB (8 September 1812 – 20 November 1899) was a British government official and statistician. During his tenure as a public servant in Canada he contributed to the Report on the affairs of the Indians in Canada, a foundational document in the establishment of the Canadian Indian residential school system.

== Early life and Board of Trade ==
Rawson Rawson was born in 1812, the son of the noted oculist Sir William Adams Rawson (1783-1827) and Jane Eliza Rawson (died 1844), daughter of Colonel George Rawson of Belmont House, County Wicklow, MP for Armagh and his wife Mary Bowes Benson. His father, son of Henry Adams, a native of Morwenstow in Cornwall, had originally had the surname Adams, but had changed his name to Rawson in 1825 to commemorate his wife's father, and also gave it as a first name to his son.

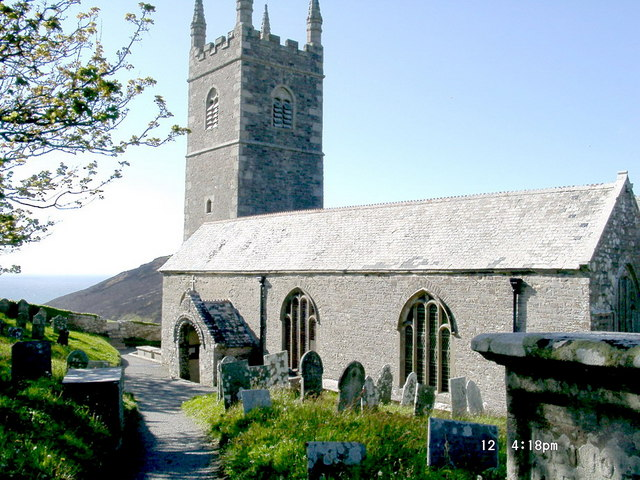
Morwenstow, Cornwall, where Rawson's father was born

Rawson was educated at Eton and entered the Board of Trade at the age of seventeen. He served as private secretary to three successive vice-presidents of the Board, Charles Poulett Thomson, Alexander Baring and William Ewart Gladstone.

== Colonial service (1842–1875) ==
In 1842, having served Gladstone for one year he was appointed Civil Secretary to the then Governor-General of Canada Charles Bagot. The same year, he was appointed by Bagot – along with John Davidson and William Hepburn – as commissioner for a report regarding government policies and expenditures related to Indigenous peoples in Canada East and Canada West. Completed in 1844, the final report, titled the Report on the affairs of the Indians in Canada, included a call for the introduction of industrial schools to address the noted failure of day schools to effectively keep Indigenous children from the influence of their parents. The report is regarded as a foundational document in the rationale for establishing the Canadian Indian residential school system. In 1846, following his work on the report, Rawson was appointed treasurer and paymaster-general to Mauritius.

In 1854 he became colonial secretary in the Cape of Good Hope, which had just formed its first locally elected parliament. Soon after accepting this post, he was awarded a CB, and attained considerable local fame for his overly elaborate dress of lace collars, cuffs and buttons. Whilst in the Cape, he was exceptionally involved in the study of ferns and other plants, in the establishment of the South African Museum, as well as in the details of parliamentary procedure. However, his abilities as a financier were repeatedly questioned, as the Cape government became severely indebted and eventually entered a recession. Parliamentary writer Richard William Murray records that in both Mauritius and the Cape Colony, Rawson had left the state "as nearly bankrupt as it is possible for a British dependency to be". Rawson was also notable for being among the government officials who supported the early movement for "responsible government" in the Cape, and therefore supported the handing over of power to a locally elected executive, to replace imperial officials like himself. He was retired from the post on 21 July 1864, to be succeeded by Sir Richard Southey.

His next post was the governorship of the Bahamas in July 1864, and he was subsequently promoted to the governorship of the Windward Islands and received a KCMG. He retired from public office in 1875. He was elected to the American Philosophical Society the year before, in 1874.

== Statistical Society and later life ==
He was president of the Statistical Society (now called the Royal Statistical Society) (1884–1886), an organisation of which he was a staunch supporter. He had originally joined the Society in March 1835, and briefly held the post of editor of the Society's Journal, from 1837 to 1842.

On his retirement from public office, he was re-elected to the Society's Council in 1876 and remained in the post till his death. It was largely due to the efforts of Rawson that the society received its charter of incorporation in 1887. He was also the founding president of the International Statistical Institute.

== Family ==
Rawson married in 1849 Sophia Mary-Anne Ward, daughter of the Reverend Henry Ward, vicar of Killinchy, County Down and sister of the New Zealand-based politician Crosbie Ward. They had had eight children, including FA Cup finalists Herbert Rawson (1852–1924), William Rawson (1854–1932), and Frederick Rawson (1859–1923).
