= Wells House, County Wexford =

Country house in County Wexford, Ireland

Coordinates: 52.528337°N 6.344942°W

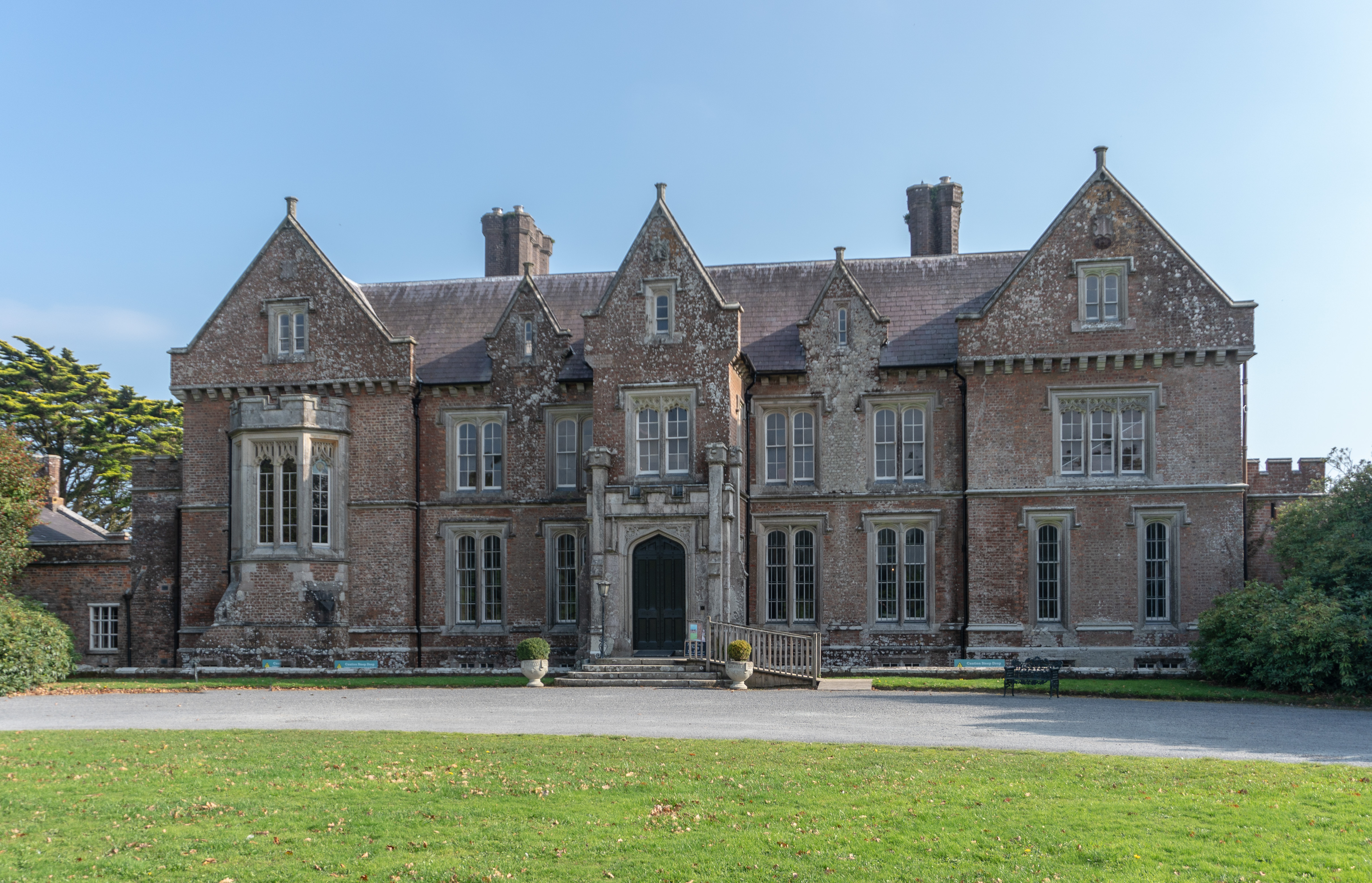
Wells House in 2018

Wells House and Gardens is a Victorian tudor gothic country house museum, around 7 km north-west of Kilmuckridge, County Wexford, Ireland.

== History ==
It was designed by Daniel Robertson (of Powerscourt and Kilruddery House in County Wicklow and Johnstown Castle) in the 1830s. It replaced the original house which was built in the late seventeenth century by the former Cromwellian army officer John Warren, and bought after his death by the eminent judge Sir Robert Doyne: the Doyne family lived here until 1964. In 1965, the house was bought by German industrialist Gerhard Rosler, who lived there with his family until his death. Rosler added a bowling alley to the property, now Robertson Hall.

It was opened to the general public in July 2012, by Gerhard Rosler's son Uli and wife Sabine, who inherited the property upon his death. It is the most visited attraction in the county of Wexford, being named "Ireland's Best Family Day Out" by Today FM in 2015. The house has extensive gardens, an animal farm, a cafe and a children's playground. Archery and falconry are also practised. It is situated on the R741 road, near the small village of Ballyedmond and about 18 km south of Gorey. It features as a suggested stop on the Ireland's Ancient East touring area. A number of local businesses have been housed on the grounds, including a wildlife sanctuary which closed in 2016. The house is owned today by Sean Doyle Group.

== Awards ==
- AIB North Wexford Tourism Award 2015 - Gorey chamber of commerce
- Ireland's Best Family Day Out 2015 - Today FM

== Official Website ==
Official website
