= William Norcott (satirist) =

- Education: Trinity College
- Occupations: Lawyer; satarist

William Norcott (c. 1770 – c. 1820) was an Irish lawyer and satirist. He has been credited as the author of several works, such as The Metropolis, which created a sensation in Dublin in the early 1800s. He was regarded as self-indulgent and, according to contemporary accounts, ended his life in poverty in Constantinople, where he was decapitated and his body thrown into the sea.

== Early life ==
William Norcott was born around 1770, and graduated BA from Trinity College, Dublin, in 1795. He received his LLB in 1801, and his LLD in 1806.

== Career ==
Norcott was called to the Irish bar in 1797, and according to David James O'Donoghue in the Dictionary of National Biography, he was successful for a while but preferred social life to his legal work. He was popular at Dublin Castle during the Duke of Richmond's viceroyalty and in Dublin society, partly due to his excellent skill at mimicry. He was described in Jonah Barrington's Personal Sketches as "a fat, full-faced, portly-looking person."

O'Donoghue wrote that Norcott was the author, with his friend John Wilson Croker, of a number of poetic satires that were published in Dublin after the union with Great Britain and that the following pieces could be attributed to him with confidence:

- The Metropolis, an attack on various Dublin institutions, dedicated to John Wilson Croker, 1805; 2nd ed. 1805.
- The Metropolis part 2, dedicated to Thomas Moore, 1806; 2nd ed. 1806.
- The Seven Thieves: A Satire, by the author of "The Metropolis," dedicated to Henry Grattan, 1807; 2nd ed., 1807.
- The Law Scrutiny; Or the Attornie's Guide, a satire, dedicated to George Ponsonby, lord chancellor of Ireland, 1807.

These works were published by John Barlow of Bolton Street, who also published Croker's Familiar Epistles and, according to O'Donoghue, caused a considerable stir in Dublin. Norcott, Grady, and Croker were each thought to be the author, and Richard Frizelle was also credited with writing The Metropolis. According to O'Donoghue, an author in the Dublin University Magazine (lviii. 725) named Norcott as the author, as did Barrington and Richard Lalor Sheil. It has also been claimed, however, that Andrew Blair Carmichael was the author of both parts of The Metropolis.

Norcott was described as a "reckless gambler and generally dissipated" who "soon fell into debt and disgrace". His library of law books was sold by Thomas Jones in Dublin in December 1810. In 1811 his art collection was also sold. About 1815, however, through Croker's influence, he obtained an excellent position in Malta but failed to hold it for long, and fled the island "entirely discredited".

== Later life ==
After leaving Malta, Norcott eventually reached Smyrna in the Ottoman Empire, where he lived by selling rhubarb and opium in the streets. He then travelled to Morea and on to Constantinople, where he lived in poverty, became a Muslim, and wrote to his friends in "heartrending" terms. Around 1820, he rejected Islam and attempted to leave Constantinople, but after being pursued and captured, he was decapitated and his body thrown into the sea. The story of his later life is detailed in Sheil's Sketches of the Irish Bar and Barrington's Personal Sketches.
