= Solomon Richards (surgeon) =

Irish surgeon

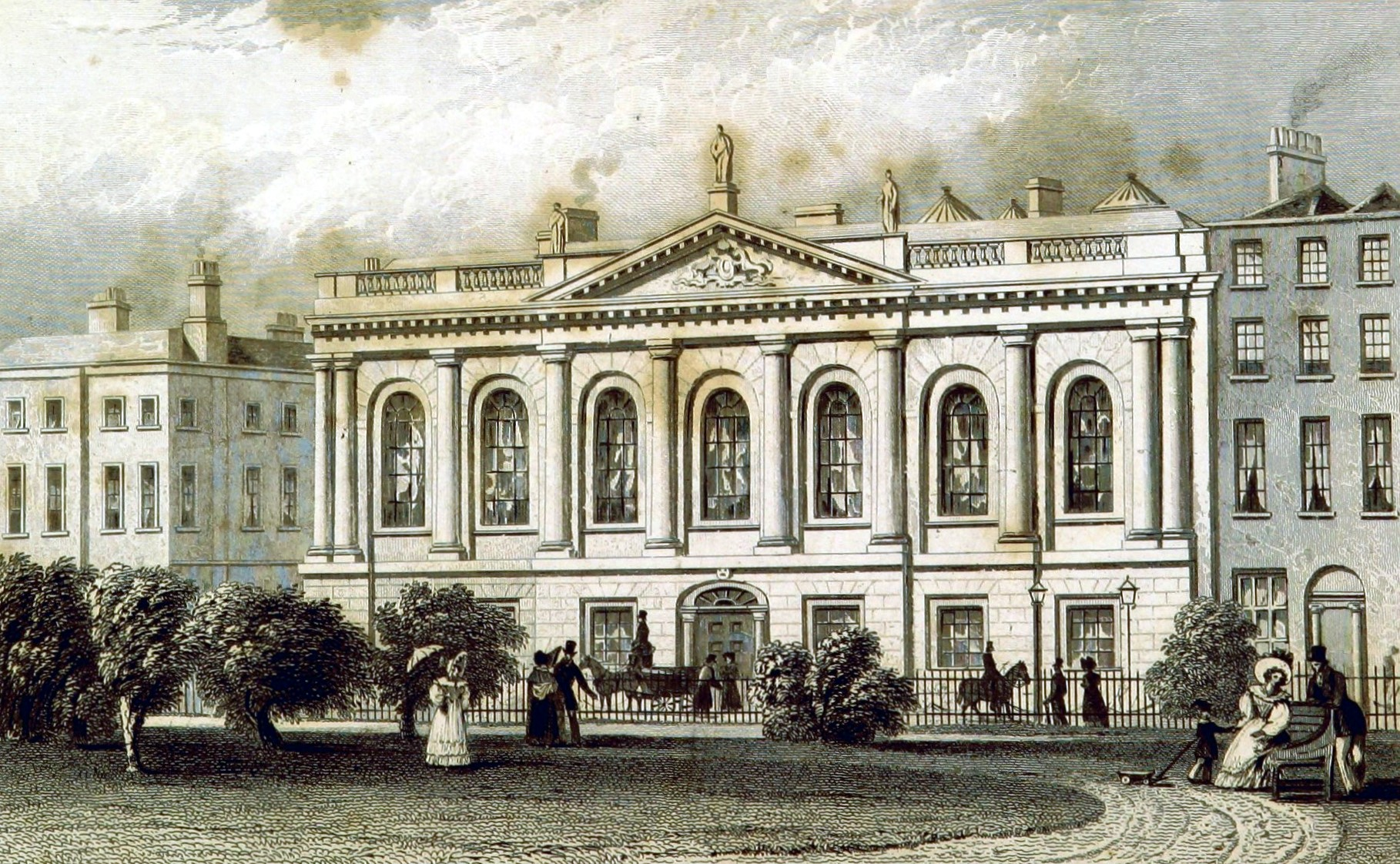
"The College of Surgeons, Dublin", 1837

Solomon Richards (c. 1760 – 6 November 1819) was an Irish surgeon who served four terms as president of the Royal College of Surgeons in Ireland (RCSI) in 1794, 1803, 1808, and 1818. He achieved fame by performing a tracheotomy in public for which act he featured in a satirical poem in The Metropolis. He was praised for his philanthropy and noted for his puns and bon mots. He was said to be the "fattest surgeon in the United Kingdom".

== Early life ==
Solomon Richards was born in York Street, Dublin, about 1760, the second son of Goddard Richards of Grange, County Wexford. According to Charles Cameron, Richards received an "excellent classical education".

He married Elizabeth Groome, daughter of the Reverend Edward Groome. They had five children.

== Career ==
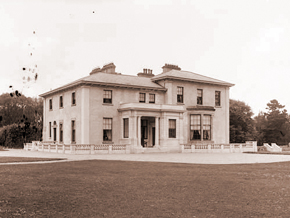
Ardamine House, n.d.

Richards was apprenticed to James Boyton, of St Andrew Street, an assistant surgeon to Dr Steevens' Hospital. After the end of his apprenticeship in April 1781, he travelled to London, Edinburgh, and Paris, to study under the foremost teachers of his time. He was examined after returning to Ireland and received his Letters Testimonial in February 1785. He was elected a member of the RCSI in May 1785, and was four times elected president, in 1794, 1803, 1808, and 1818. He was a member of the Royal Irish Academy and the Royal Dublin Society.

He first practised medicine in South Great George's Street, but soon moved to York Street, where he lived until his death. He was appointed surgeon to the Meath Hospital in 1790 in succession to Arthur Winton, a position he held for the rest of his life. While at the Meath, he took on a number of apprentices who went on to have distinguished careers in medicine. These included Philip Crampton who was apprenticed to Richards for five years from November 1792 at the age of 14 and was later four times president of RCSI, after Richards only the second person to so serve; Richard Dease apprenticed for the same term as Crampton and president of RCSI in 1809; and Thomas Hewson for five years from May 1801 who was president in 1819.

After the death of Samuel Croker-King in 1817, Richards took over as visiting surgeon and governor to Dr Steevens' Hospital.

Richards was well respected and known as "Sol" by his friends. According to Cameron, he was of a charitable nature and gave his services to the poor without charge. He was known for his puns and bon mots. His lecturing style was praised for its lucidity and his speech for its diction.

== Incidents ==
In 1805, according to an account in The Dublin Quarterly Journal of Medical Science in 1859, Richards was asked to advise on a case of a newborn child that showed signs of syphilitic infection and soon after died. The father reported that he had been treated successfully for syphilis with mercury over two years earlier. The attending physician sought Richards's advice as to whether the parents should have a course of mercury before having another child but Richards advised against it on the grounds that such treatment would not eliminate "latent syphilis". The mother subsequently had a "putrid child" but Richards continued to advise against mercury on the grounds that the "venereal taint" would eventually wear itself out and the couple went on to have a number of healthy births as well as some that were premature or unhealthy.

Like Sir Philip Crampton in 1810, Richards became famous by performing a tracheotomy in public. According to a pseudonymous author writing in Fraser's Magazine, and reprinted in The Eclectic Magazine in 1863, the incident took place in the coffee room of the Irish House of Commons and the patient was Denis Browne. It was referred to by the author of The Metropolis, probably the satirist William Norcott, as follows:

"Of old, more active, when by merit push'd
Beyond his rivals, to the goal he rush'd.
But not less worthy of the sweepstakes won
He holds the distance, as he first begun.
To Fortune's smiles, that glisten on so few,
Oft times as much as to desert is due;
If Lords and Commons, when a shank of mutton
Stuck in the throttle of some greedy glutton,
Ne'er saw thy dexterous knife the windpipe slit,
And his tight gullet render back the bit;
How long, midst garret-patients had you struggled
E'er your lost skill to drawing-rooms was smuggled."

Richards was said to be the "fattest surgeon in the United Kingdom", requiring him to enter a carriage sideways. He was a good friend of fellow surgeon Ralph Smith O’bré who, by contrast, was known for his small size. According to one story, which may be apocryphal, they were once robbed on the highway while returning from an operation in the country. O'bré saved himself by hiding behind Richards who had all his money and surgical equipment stolen. In return, Richards gave up O'bré who was also robbed and Richards negotiated his own belongings back.

== Wealth ==
In 1812, Richards won £10,000 in a lottery. In that year, he purchased land in the Roebuck Grove area of the Roebuck Estate in County Dublin from the Baron Trimlestown and in 1818 he purchased the Ardamine Estate near Gorey in County Wexford from Sir Thomas Roberts, 1st Baronet. He also bought property from Abel Ram of Clonattin.

== Death and legacy ==
Richards was found dead in bed by his wife on the morning of 6 November 1819. He was survived by his eldest son John Goddard Richards, barrister. His position at the Meath Hospital was taken over by W. H. Porter, who carried on research and wrote papers on tracheotomy. His County Wexford home Ardamine House was destroyed by the IRA in 1921 and not rebuilt.
