= Sampson Moore =

English engineer (1812–1877)

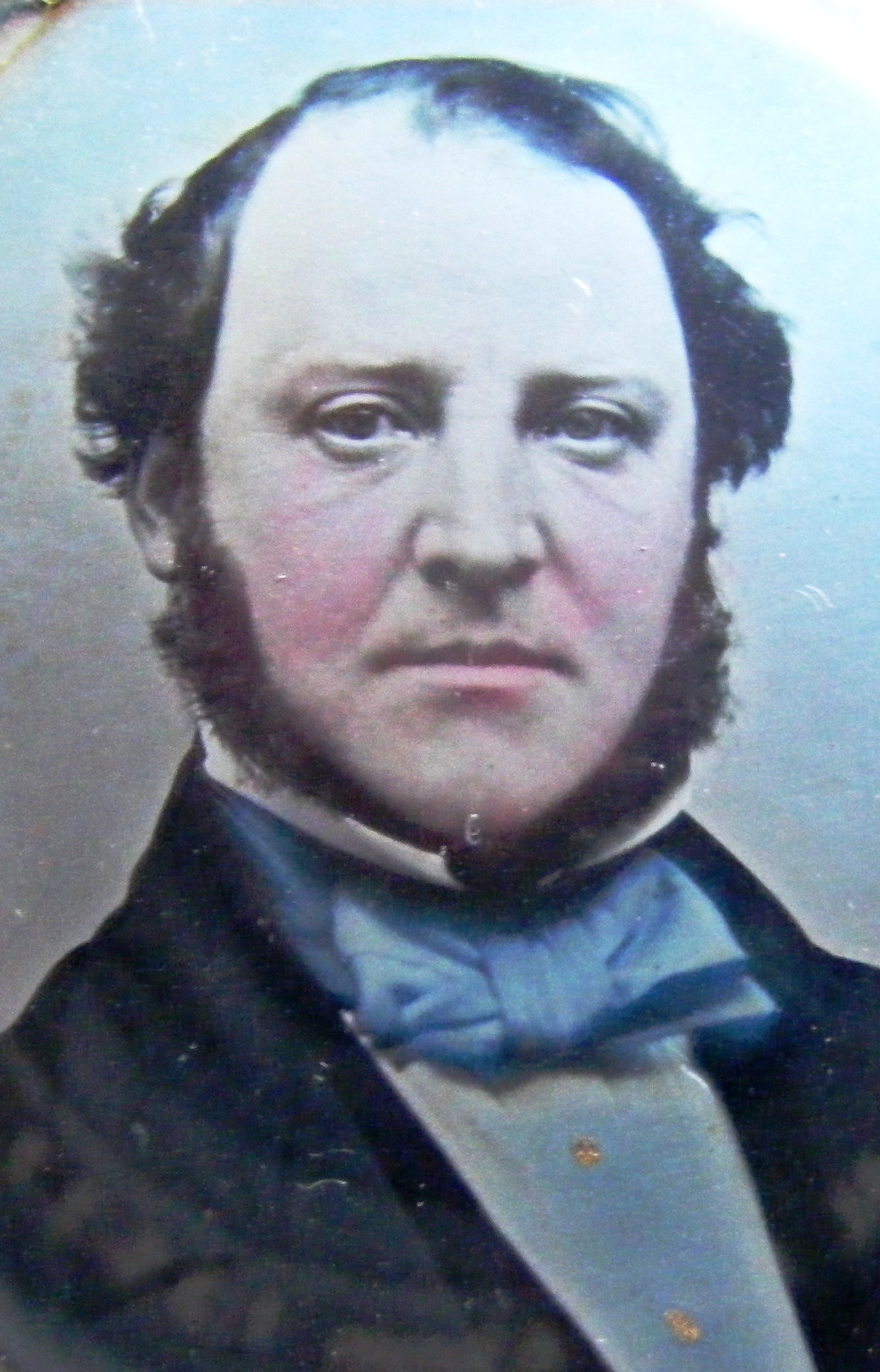
- Hand-coloured daguerreotype of Moore, c. 1850
- Born: c. 1812
- Died: 1877 (aged 64–65)

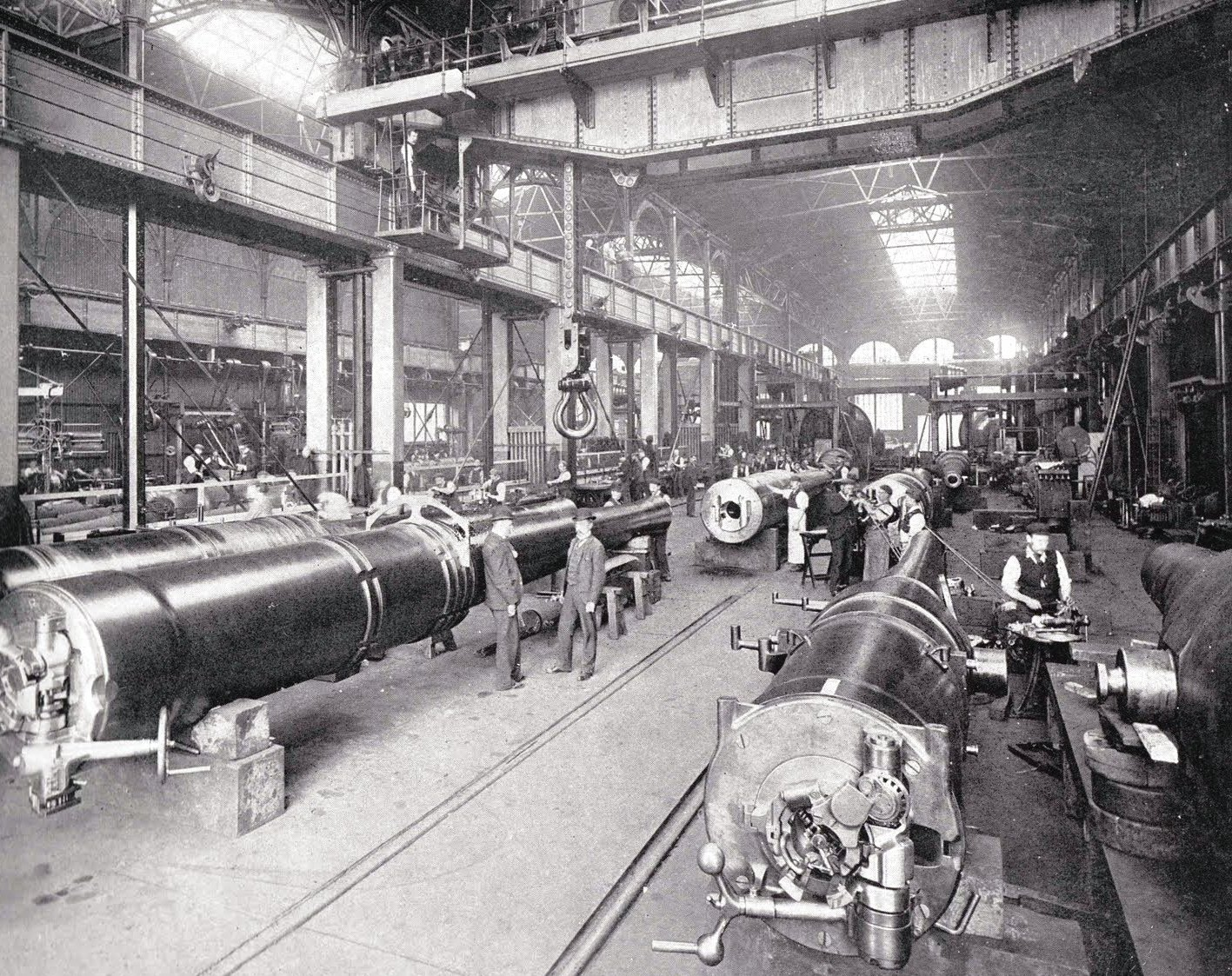
The overhead electric crane fitted by Sampson Moore & Co at the Royal Gun Factory, Woolwich (c. 1897)

Sampson Moore (c. 1812 – 1877) was an English engineer and inventor based in Liverpool, England during the Industrial Revolution. His company, Sampson Moore & Co. produced a number of notable inventions.

== Overview ==
Moore was an engineer based in Liverpool. His company, Sampson Moore & Co. specialised in casting large iron structures and owned North Foundry in Gt Howard Street Liverpool. Sampson Moore & Co. supplied mortars for the Royal Navy. Goods were shipped overseas on the 105 ft wooden steamship, the SS James Dennistoun. In 1876, Sampson Moore designed and supplied the first electric overhead crane, which was used to hoist guns at the Royal Arsenal in Woolwich, London. Specifically he patented the improved winch mechanism that allowed the lifting of heavier weights (such as naval guns) by an electric motor. Electric overhead cranes were subsequently installed in several foundries in the north of England and were considered one of many technical advancements of the British Industrial Revolution. The invention was celebrated in the Opening Scene of the London 2012 Olympics, where an electric overhead crane lifted cast Olympic rings out of a staged foundry in the Pandemonium scene. Other notable inventions included a machine for rolling tobacco and machines for rolling and polishing rice.

== Violin collection ==
Moore was also well known as a collector of violins. Several of Moore's instruments were included in the "Special Exhibition" of musical instruments in London in 1872. These included violins by Landolfi made in 1776 and a Richard Duke violin from 1756. The exhibition was chaired by Prince Alfred, the Duke of Edinburgh, who was himself a keen violinist and subsequently Sampson Moore supplied Prince Alfred with several instruments. In 1874 he located two violins which had belonged years earlier to the Prince's late uncle the Duke of Cambridge, for which Alfred was particularly appreciative.

== Personal life ==
Sampson Moore married Elizabeth Grindle (b. 1806) on 20 Jun 1833 at the church of St Peter in Liverpool. They had one daughter, Elizabeth Moore (b. 1834) and one son, Stanley Moore, who was living in Tasmania at the time of his father's death.
