= Ardamine Estate =

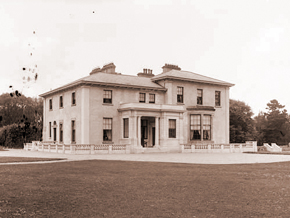
- Ardamine House

General information
- Location: Gorey, County Wexford, Ireland
- Coordinates: 52°40′37″N 6°17′30″W
- Destroyed: 8 July 1921

The Ardamine Estate was a country estate and house near Gorey, in County Wexford, Ireland. The house was destroyed in an IRA attack on 9 July 1921 and not rebuilt.

The house and estate was acquired by Solomon Richards in 1818 with the proceeds of an 1812 lottery win of £10,000 and inherited by his successors.

== See also ==
- Destruction of Irish country houses (1919–1923)
- Roebuck Estate
