= List of parliaments of the United Kingdom =

This is a list of parliaments of the United Kingdom, tabulated with the elections to the House of Commons and the list of members of the House.

The parliaments are numbered from the formation of the United Kingdom of Great Britain and Ireland. For previous Westminster parliaments, see the list of parliaments of Great Britain and list of parliaments of England. For pre-Union Dublin parliaments, see the list of parliaments of Ireland. For pre-1707 Scottish parliaments, see the list of parliaments of Scotland.

== List of parliaments ==
Monarch	Number	Start date	Election	Members	Prime ministers (Note: The term prime minister was not officially recognised until Campbell-Bannerman, although the title had been in common use, if initially as an insult, since 1721.)	Party control (Note: The parties listed are those that won the election. During the 19th century, the party of government sometimes changed between general elections.)	Percentage of popular vote
George III	1	1801	none: co-opted		William Pitt	Tory	
George III	1	1801	none: co-opted		Henry Addington	Tory	
George III	2	1802	General election	MPs	Henry Addington	Tory	
George III	2	1802	General election	MPs	William Pitt	Tory	
George III	3	1806	General election	MPs	The Lord Grenville	Whig	
George III	4	1807	General election	MPs	The Duke of Portland	Tory	
George III	4	1807	General election	MPs	Spencer Perceval	Tory	
George III	4	1807	General election	MPs	The Earl of Liverpool	Tory	
George III	5	1812	General election	MPs	The Earl of Liverpool	Tory	
George III	6	1818	General election	MPs	The Earl of Liverpool	Tory	
George IV	7	1820	General election	MPs	The Earl of Liverpool	Tory	
George IV	8	1826	General election	MPs	The Earl of Liverpool	Tory	
George IV	8	1826	General election	MPs	George Canning	Tory	
George IV	8	1826	General election	MPs	The Viscount Goderich	Tory	
George IV	8	1826	General election	MPs	The Duke of Wellington	Tory	
William IV	9	1830	General election	MPs	The Earl Grey	Tory	59.3%
William IV	10	1831	General election	MPs	The Earl Grey	Whig	63.3%
William IV	11	1832	General election	MPs	The Earl Grey	Whig	67.0%
William IV	11	1832	General election	MPs	The Viscount Melbourne	Whig	67.0%
William IV	11	1832	General election	MPs	Sir Robert Peel	Whig	67.0%
William IV	12	1835	General election	MPs	The Viscount Melbourne	Whig	55.2%
Victoria	13	1837	General election	MPs	The Viscount Melbourne	Whig	51.7%
Victoria	14	1841	General election	MPs	Sir Robert Peel	Conservative	56.9%
Victoria	15	1847	General election	MPs	Lord John Russell	Whig	53.8%
Victoria	16	1852	General election	MPs	The Earl of Derby	Conservative	41.9%
Victoria	16	1852	General election	MPs	The Earl of Aberdeen	Conservative	41.9%
Victoria	17	1857	General election	MPs	The Viscount Palmerston	Whig	65.9%
Victoria	17	1857	General election	MPs	The Earl of Derby	Whig	65.9%
Victoria	18	1859	General election	MPs	The Viscount Palmerston	Liberal	65.7%
Victoria	19	1865	General election	MPs	The Earl Russell	Liberal	59.5%
Victoria	19	1865	General election	MPs	The Earl of Derby	Liberal	59.5%
Victoria	19	1865	General election	MPs	Benjamin Disraeli	Liberal	59.5%
Victoria	20	1868	General election	MPs	William Ewart Gladstone	Liberal	61.5%
Victoria	21	1874	General election	MPs	Benjamin Disraeli (Note: Disraeli was made the Earl of Beaconsfield from 1876, during his term as prime minister.)	Conservative	44.3%
Victoria	22	1880	General election	MPs	William Ewart Gladstone	Liberal	54.7%
Victoria	23	1885	General election	MPs	The Marquess of Salisbury	Liberal (minority)	47.4%
Victoria	23	1885	General election	MPs	William Ewart Gladstone	Liberal (minority)	47.4%
Victoria	24	1886	General election	MPs	The Marquess of Salisbury	Conservative	51.1%
Victoria	25	1892	General election	MPs	William Ewart Gladstone	Liberal (minority)	45.4%
Victoria	25	1892	General election	MPs	The Earl of Rosebery	Liberal (minority)	45.4%
Victoria	26	1895	General election	MPs	The Marquess of Salisbury	Conservative	49.0%
Victoria	27	1900	General election	MPs	The Marquess of Salisbury	Conservative	50.3%
Edward VII	27	1900	General election	MPs	Arthur Balfour	Conservative	50.3%
Edward VII	28	1906	General election	MPs	Sir Henry Campbell-Bannerman	Liberal	48.9%
Edward VII	28	1906	General election	MPs	Herbert Asquith	Liberal	48.9%
Edward VII	29	1910 (Jan)	General election	MPs	Herbert Asquith	Liberal (minority)	43.5%
George V	29	1910 (Jan)	General election	MPs	Herbert Asquith	Liberal (minority)	43.5%
George V	30	1910 (Dec)	General election	MPs	Herbert Asquith	Liberal (minority)	43.2%
George V	30	1910 (Dec)	General election	MPs	David Lloyd George	Liberal (minority)	43.2%
George V	31	1918	General election	MPs	David Lloyd George	Coalition (Coa.Lib–Con–Lab)	47.1%
George V	32	1922	General election	MPs	Bonar Law	Conservative	38.5%
George V	33	1923	General election	MPs	Ramsay MacDonald	Labour (minority)	30.7%
George V	34	1924	General election	MPs	Stanley Baldwin	Conservative	46.8%
George V	35	1929	General election	MPs	Ramsay MacDonald	Labour (minority)	37.1%
George V	36	1931	General election	MPs	Ramsay MacDonald	National Government	67.2%
George V	37	1935	General election	MPs	Stanley Baldwin	National Government	53.3%
Edward VIII	37	1935	General election	MPs	Stanley Baldwin	National Government	53.3%
George VI	37	1935	General election	MPs	Stanley Baldwin	National Government	53.3%
George VI	37	1935	General election	MPs	Neville Chamberlain	National Government	53.3%
George VI	37	1935	General election	MPs	Winston Churchill	National Government	53.3%
George VI	38	1945	General election	MPs	Clement Attlee	Labour	49.7%
George VI	39	1950	General election	MPs	Clement Attlee	Labour	46.1%
George VI	40	1951	General election	MPs	Winston Churchill (Note: Churchill was made Sir Winston Churchill from 1953, during his term as prime minister.)	Conservative	48.0%
Elizabeth II	40	1951	General election	MPs	Winston Churchill	Conservative	48.0%
Elizabeth II	41	1955	General election	MPs	Anthony Eden	Conservative	49.7%
Elizabeth II	41	1955	General election	MPs	Harold Macmillan	Conservative	49.7%
Elizabeth II	42	1959	General election	MPs	Harold Macmillan	Conservative	49.4%
Elizabeth II	42	1959	General election	MPs	Sir Alec Douglas-Home (Note: Sir Alec Douglas-Home was The Earl of Home until disclaiming his peerages four days after becoming prime minister in 1963.)	Conservative	49.4%
Elizabeth II	43	1964	General election	MPs	Harold Wilson	Labour	44.1%
Elizabeth II	44	1966	General election	MPs	Harold Wilson	Labour	48.0%
Elizabeth II	45	1970	General election	MPs	Edward Heath	Conservative	46.4%
Elizabeth II	46	1974 (Feb)	General election	MPs	Harold Wilson	Labour (minority)	37.2%
Elizabeth II	47	1974 (Oct)	General election	MPs	Harold Wilson	Labour	39.2%
Elizabeth II	47	1974 (Oct)	General election	MPs	James Callaghan	Labour	39.2%
Elizabeth II	48	1979	General election	MPs	Margaret Thatcher	Conservative	43.9%
Elizabeth II	49	1983	General election	MPs	Margaret Thatcher	Conservative	42.3%
Elizabeth II	50	1987	General election	MPs	Margaret Thatcher	Conservative	42.2%
Elizabeth II	50	1987	General election	MPs	John Major	Conservative	42.2%
Elizabeth II	51	1992	General election	MPs	John Major	Conservative	41.9%
Elizabeth II	52	1997	General election	MPs	Tony Blair	Labour	43.2%
Elizabeth II	53	2001	General election	MPs	Tony Blair	Labour	40.7%
Elizabeth II	54	2005	General election	MPs	Tony Blair	Labour	35.2%
Elizabeth II	54	2005	General election	MPs	Gordon Brown	Labour	35.2%
Elizabeth II	55	2010	General election	MPs	David Cameron	Coalition (Con–Lib.Dem)	59.1%
Elizabeth II	56	2015	General election	MPs	David Cameron	Conservative	36.9%
Elizabeth II	56	2015	General election	MPs	Theresa May	Conservative	36.9%
Elizabeth II	57	2017	General election	MPs	Theresa May	Conservative	42.4%
Elizabeth II	57	2017	General election	MPs	Boris Johnson	Conservative	42.4%
Elizabeth II	58	2019	General election	MPs	Boris Johnson	Conservative	43.6%
Elizabeth II	58	2019	General election	MPs	Liz Truss	Conservative	43.6%
Charles III	58	2019	General election	MPs	Liz Truss	Conservative	43.6%
Charles III	58	2019	General election	MPs	Rishi Sunak	Conservative	43.6%
Charles III	59	2024	General election	MPs	Sir Keir Starmer	Labour	33.7%
Charles III	59	2024	General election	MPs	Andy Burnham	Labour	33.7%

== See also ==
- Duration of English parliaments before 1660
- Duration of English, British and United Kingdom parliaments from 1660
- List of parliaments of England
- List of parliaments of Scotland
- List of parliaments of Great Britain
- List of British governments
