= 1859 United Kingdom general election =

- 28 April – 18 May 1859

All 654 seats in the House of Commons 328 seats needed for a majority
- Turnout: 565,500
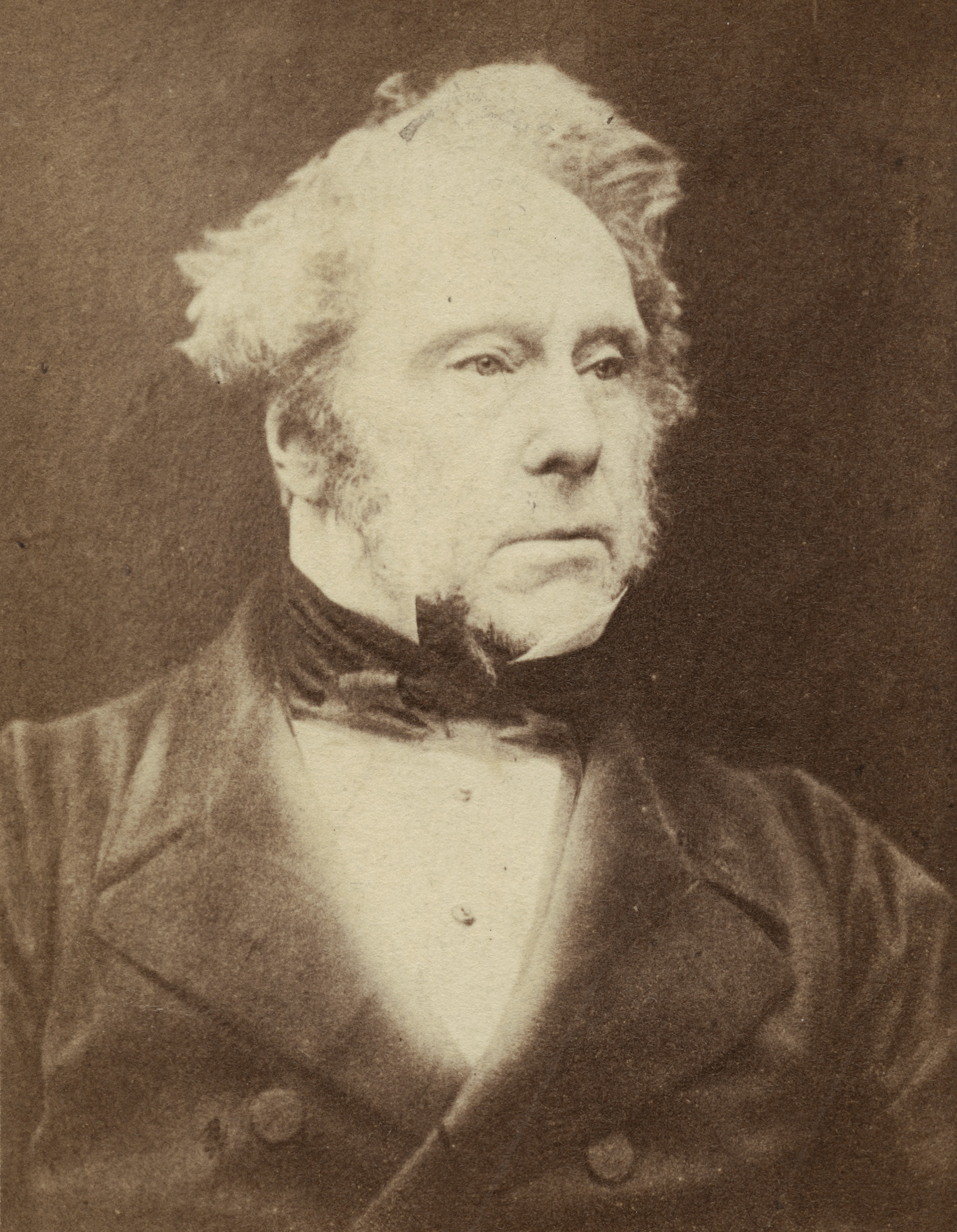

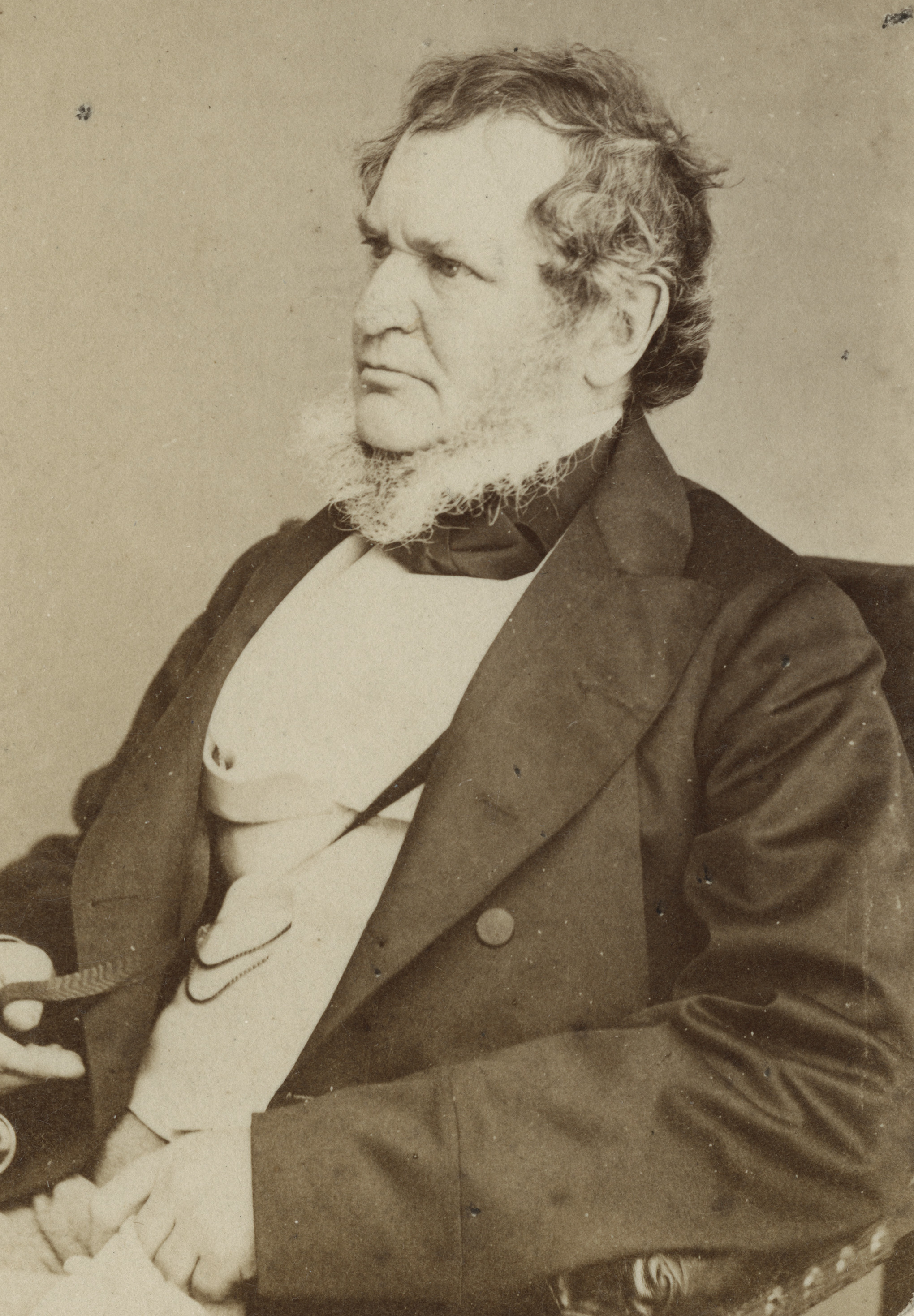
| | First party | Second party |
|---|---|---|
| Leader | Viscount Palmerston | Earl of Derby |
| Party | Liberal | Conservative |
| Leader since | 6 February 1855 | July 1846 |
| Leader's seat | Tiverton | House of Lords |
| Last election | 377 seats, 64.8% | 264 seats, 33.5% |
| Seats won | 356 (Note: The seat and vote count figures for the Liberals given here include the Speaker of the House of Commons) | 298 |
| Seat change | ▼21 | ▲34 |
| Popular vote | 372,117 | 193,232 |
| Percentage | 65.8% | 34.2% |
| Swing | ▲1.0 pp | ▲0.7 pp |
- Colours denote the winning party—as shown in § Results

- Composition of the House of Commons after the election
Prime Minister before election
Earl of Derby
Conservative
Prime Minister after election
Viscount Palmerston
Whig

The 1859 United Kingdom general election was held from 28 April to 18 May 1859 following the defeat of Prime Minister the Earl of Derby's Conservative government in a vote of confidence. The newly formed Liberal Party, led by Viscount Palmerston, secured victory despite winning fewer seats than in the previous election.

There is no separate tally of votes or seats for the Peelites. They did not contest elections as an organised party but more as independent Free trade Conservatives with varying degrees of distance from the two main parties.

It was also the last general election entered by the Chartists, before their organisation was dissolved. As of 2024, this is the last election in which the Conservatives won the most seats in Wales.

The election was the quietest and least competitive between 1832 and 1885, with most county elections being uncontested. The election also saw the lowest number of candidates between 1832 and 1885, with Tory gains potentially being the result of a lack of opposition as much as a change in public opinion. According to A. J. P. Taylor:

the government which Palmerston organized in June 1859 was a coalition of a different kind: not a coalition of groups which looked back to the past, but a coalition which anticipated the future. Had it not been for Palmerston himself—too individual, too full of personality to be fitted into a party-pattern—it would have been the first Liberal government in our history. Everything that was important in it was Liberal—finance, administrative reform, its very composition: the first government with unmistakable middle-class Free Traders as members.

== Results ==

1859 United Kingdom general election
| Party | Candidates | | | | | | Votes | | |
| Party | Stood | Elected | Gained | Unseated | Net | % of total | % | No. | Net % |
|---|---|---|---|---|---|---|---|---|---|
| Liberal | 465 | 356 | | | −21 | 54.43 | 65.80 | 372,117 | −0.2 |
| Conservative | 394 | 298 | | | +34 | 45.57 | 34.17 | 193,232 | +0.3 |
| Chartist | 1 | 0 | 0 | 0 | 0 | 0 | 0.03 | 151 | −0.1 |

=== Voting summary ===
Popular vote
| Liberal | 65.80% |
| Conservative | 34.17% |
| Chartist | 0.09% |

=== Seats summary ===
Parliamentary seats
| Liberal | 54.43% |
| Conservative | 45.57% |

=== Regional results ===
==== Great Britain ====
| Party | Candidates | Unopposed | Seats | Seats change | Votes | % | % change |
|---|---|---|---|---|---|---|---|
| Liberal | 392 | 157 | 306 | | 314,708 | 66.6 | |
| Conservative & Peelites | 327 | 160 | 245 | | 157,974 | 33.4 | |
| Chartist | 1 | 0 | 0 | | 151 | 0.0 | |
| Total | 720 | 317 | 551 | Same position | 472,833 | 100 | |

===== England =====
| Party | Candidates | Unopposed | Seats | Seats change | Votes | % | % change |
|---|---|---|---|---|---|---|---|
| Liberal | 330 | 109 | 251 | | 307,949 | 67.1 | |
| Conservative & Peelite | 286 | 129 | 209 | | 152,591 | 32.9 | |
| Chartist | 1 | 0 | 0 | | 151 | 0.0 | |
| Total | 617 | 238 | 460 | Same position | 460,691 | 100 | |

===== Scotland =====
| Party | Candidates | Unopposed | Seats | Seats change | Votes | % | % change |
|---|---|---|---|---|---|---|---|
| Liberal | 44 | 34 | 40 | | 5,174 | 66.4 | |
| Conservative & Peelite | 17 | 11 | 13 | | 2,616 | 33.6 | |
| Total | 61 | 45 | 53 | Same position | 7,790 | 100 | |

===== Wales =====
| Party | Candidates | Unopposed | Seats | Seats change | Votes | % | % change |
|---|---|---|---|---|---|---|---|
| Conservative & Peelite | 18 | 14 | 17 | | 2,767 | 63.6 | |
| Liberal | 18 | 14 | 15 | | 1,585 | 36.4 | |
| Total | 36 | 28 | 32 | Same position | 4,352 | 100 | |

==== Ireland ====
| Party | Candidates | Unopposed | Seats | Seats change | Votes | % | % change |
|---|---|---|---|---|---|---|---|
| Irish Conservative & Peelite | 67 | 36 | 53 | | 35,258 | 38.9 | |
| Liberal | 73 | 26 | 50 | | 57,409 | 61.1 | |
| Total | 140 | 62 | 103 | | 92,667 | 100 | |

==== Universities ====
| Party | Candidates | Unopposed | Seats | Seats change | Votes | % | % change |
|---|---|---|---|---|---|---|---|
| Conservative & Peelite | 6 | 6 | 6 | | | | |
| Total | 6 | 6 | 6 | Same position | | 100 | |

== See also ==
- List of MPs elected in the 1859 United Kingdom general election
- 1859 United Kingdom general election in Ireland
