= 1847 United Kingdom general election =

← 1841	29 July – 26 August 1847	1852 →

All 656 seats in the House of Commons 329 seats needed for a majority
- Turnout: 482,429
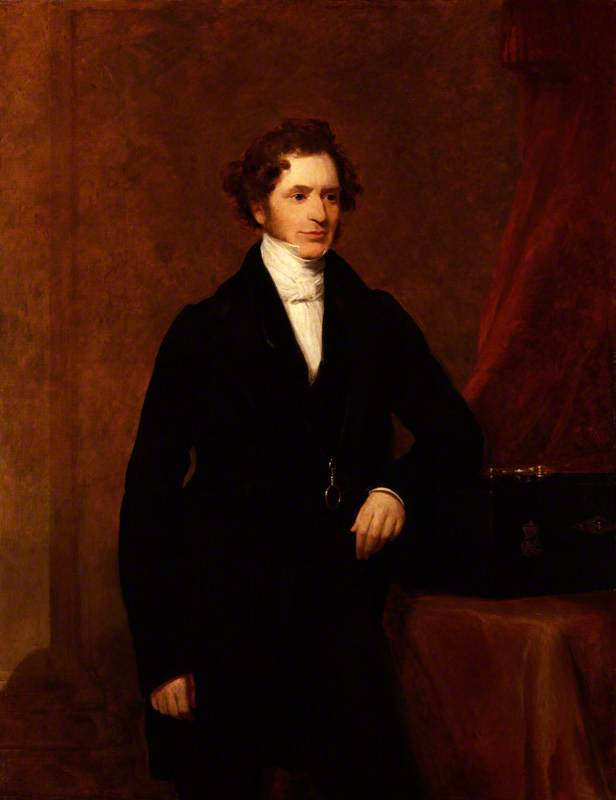

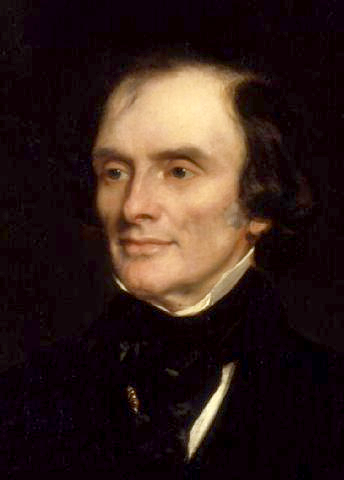
	First party	Second party	Third party
			Iri
Leader	Lord Stanley	Lord John Russell	John O'Connell
Party	Conservative	Whig	Irish Repeal
Leader since	July 1846	October 1842	15 May 1847
Leader's seat	House of Lords	City of London	Limerick City
Last election	367 seats, 51.6%	271 seats, 46.2%	20 seats, 1.9%
Seats won	325	292 (Note: The seat and vote count figures for the Whigs given here include the Speaker of the House of Commons)	36
Seat change	▼42	▲21	▲16
Popular vote	205,481	259,311	14,128
Percentage	42.6% (Note: Several country and university seats held by Conservatives were uncontested, and many urban multi-member constituencies that tended to vote Liberal had multiple candidates, so this is a misleading figure. Therefore, national swing is not applicable to elections in this era.)	53.8%	2.9%
Swing	▼9.0 pp	▲7.6 pp	▲1.0 pp
- Composition of the House of Commons after the election
Prime Minister before election
Lord John Russell
Whig
Prime Minister after election
Lord John Russell
Whig

The 1847 United Kingdom general election was held from 29 July to 26 August 1847. It saw the Conservatives win the most seats but remain divided between Protectionists and Peelites. This allowed the Whigs, led by Prime Minister Lord John Russell, to retain power.

The general election was held amid the Great Irish famine. The Irish Repeal group won more seats than in the previous general election, while the Chartists gained the only seat they were ever to hold, Nottingham's second seat, held by Chartist leader Feargus O'Connor.

The election also witnessed the election of Britain's first Jewish MP, the Liberal Lionel de Rothschild in the City of London. Members being sworn in were however required to swear the Christian Oath of Allegiance, meaning Rothschild was unable actually to take his seat until the passage of the Jews Relief Act in 1858. The constituency of Sudbury, which elected two members, was disfranchised for this election. This accounts there being two fewer seats in the House of Commons as compared to the previous election, though no redistribution took place.

== Results ==

UK General Election 1847
Party	Seats	Gains	Losses	Net gain/loss	Seats %	Votes %	Votes	+/−
Whig	292			+21	44.51	53.75	259,311	+6.9
Conservative	325			−42	49.54	42.59	205,481	−8.2
Irish Repeal	36			+16	5.49	2.93	14,128	+1.0
Chartist	1	1	0	+1	0.15	0.59	2,848	+0.4
Irish Confederate	2	2	0	+2	0.30	0.14	661	N/A

=== Voting summary ===
Popular vote
Whig	53.75%
Conservative	42.59%
Irish Repeal	2.93%
Chartist	0.59%
Others	0.14%

=== Seats summary ===
Parliamentary seats
Whig	44.51%
Conservative	49.54%
Irish Repeal	5.49%
Chartist	0.15%
Others	0.3%

=== Regional results ===
==== Great Britain ====
Party	Candidates	Unopposed	Seats	Seats change	Votes	%	% change
Conservative & Liberal Conservatives	373	180	285		194,223	43.1	
Whig	360	125	267		253,376	56.2	
Chartist	9	0	1	+1	2,848	0.6	
Total	742	305	553	Same position	450,447	100	

===== England =====
Party	Candidates	Unopposed	Seats	Seats change	Votes	%	% change
Conservative & Liberal Conservatives	319	149	239		170,407	42.1	
Whig	297	92	222		230,656	57.2	
Chartist	9	0	1	+1	2,848	0.7	
Total	625	241	462	Same position	403,911	100	

===== Scotland =====
Party	Candidates	Unopposed	Seats	Seats change	Votes	%	% change
Whig	48	21	33	+2	20,092	81.7	+20.9
Conservative & Liberal Conservatives	23	16	20	−2	3,509	18.3	−20.0
Total	71	37	53	Same position	23,601	100	

===== Wales =====
Party	Candidates	Unopposed	Seats	Seats change	Votes	%	% change
Conservative & Liberal Conservatives	22	15	20		11,114	89.5	
Whig	13	12	12		1,394	10.5	
Total	35	27	32	Same position	12,508	100	

==== Ireland ====
Party	Candidates	Unopposed	Seats	Seats change	Votes	%	% change
Irish Conservative	38	24	29	−1	10,294	31.0	−6.1
Peelite	11	9	11	−1	964	3.0	−6.1
Irish Repeal	51	18	36		14,128	43.6	
Whig	33	11	25		5,935	20.2	
Irish Confederate	3	0	2		629	2.0	
independent politician	1	0	0		32	0.2	
Total	137	62	103		31,982	100	

==== Universities ====
Party	Candidates	Unopposed	Seats	Seats change	Votes	%	% change
Conservative & Liberal Conservatives	9	0	6	Same position	9,193	88.2	
Whig	2	0	0	Same position	1,234	11.8	
Total	11	0	6	Same position	10,427	100	
