= List of MPs elected in the 1859 United Kingdom general election =

1859–1865 Parliament of the United Kingdom
←	1857–1859 Parliament	1865–1868 Parliament	→
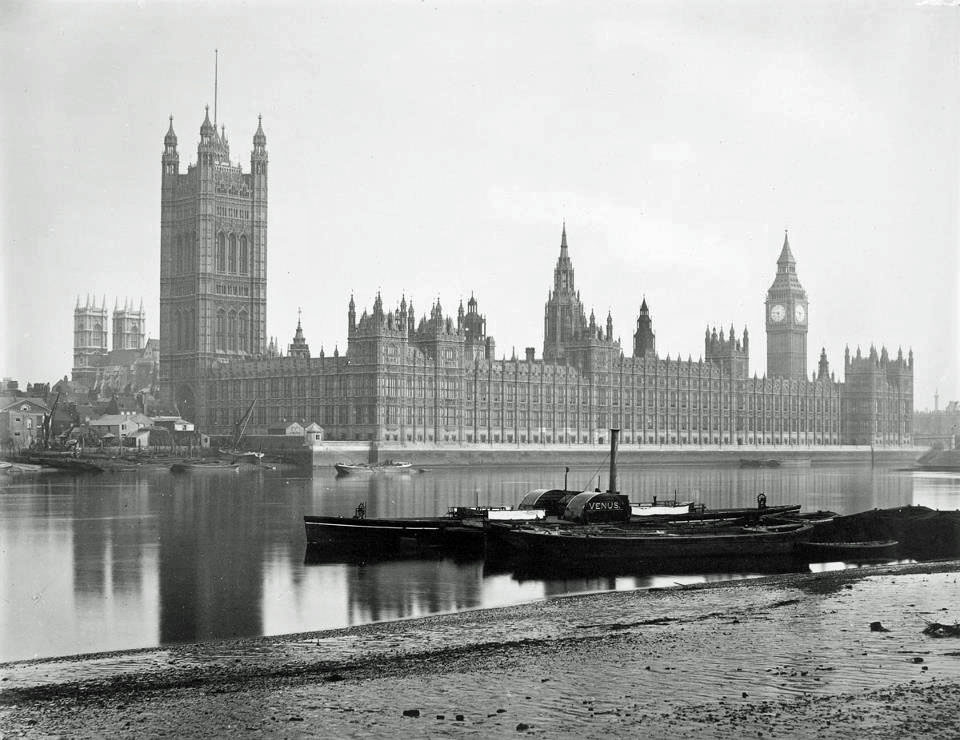
- The Palace of Westminster c.1858–1866

Overview
- Legislative body: Parliament of the United Kingdom
- Jurisdiction: United Kingdom
- Meeting place: Palace of Westminster
- Term: 31 May 1859 – 6 July 1865
- Election: 1859 United Kingdom general election
- Government: Second Derby–Disraeli ministry (until June 1859); Second Palmerston ministry (from 1859)

House of Commons
- Members: 654
- Speaker: Evelyn Denison
- Leader: Benjamin Disraeli (until June 1859); Viscount Palmerston (from 1859)
- Prime Minister: Edward Smith-Stanley (until June 1859); Viscount Palmerston (from 1859)
- Leader of the Opposition: The Viscount Palmerston (until June 1859); Benjamin Disraeli (from 1859)

House of Lords
- Lord Chancellor: Frederic Thesiger, 1st Baron Chelmsford (until June 1859); John Campbell, 1st Baron Campbell (from 1859)
- Leader: Edward Smith-Stanley, 14th Earl of Derby (until June 1859); Granville Leveson-Gower, 2nd Earl Granville (from 1859)
- Leader of the Opposition: Granville Leveson-Gower, 2nd Earl Granville (until June 1859) Edward Smith-Stanley, 14th Earl of Derby (from 1859)

Crown-in-Parliament Victoria

Sessions
- 1st: 31 May 1859 – 13 August 1859
- 2nd: 24 January 1860 – 28 August 1860
- 3rd: 5 February 1861 – 6 August 1861
- 4th: 6 February 1862 – 7 August 1862
- 5th: 5 February 1863 – 28 July 1863
- 6th: 4 February 1864 – 29 July 1864
- 7th: 7 February 1865 – 6 July 1865

This is a list of members of Parliament (MPs) elected in the 1859 general election, arranged by constituency.

Table of contents:

A B C D E F G H I K L M N O P Q R S T W Y Changes

== A ==
Constituency	MP	Party
Aberdeen	William Henry Sykes	Liberal
Aberdeenshire	Lord Haddo	Liberal
Abingdon	John Thomas Norris	Liberal
Andover (two members)	William Cubitt	Conservative
Andover (two members)	Hon. Dudley Fortescue	Liberal
Anglesey	Sir Richard Williams-Bulkeley, Bt	Liberal
Antrim (two members)	George Upton	Conservative
Antrim (two members)	Thomas Pakenham	Conservative
Argyllshire	Alexander Struthers Finlay	Liberal
Armagh	Joshua Bond	Conservative
County Armagh (two members)	William Verner	Conservative
County Armagh (two members)	Maxwell Close	Conservative
Arundel	Lord Edward Fitzalan-Howard	Liberal
Ashburton	John Harvey Astell	Conservative
Ashton-under-Lyne	Thomas Milner Gibson	Liberal
Athlone	John Ennis	Liberal
Aylesbury (two members)	Samuel George Smith	Conservative
Aylesbury (two members)	Thomas Bernard	Conservative
Ayr	Edward Craufurd	Liberal
Ayrshire	Lord Patrick Crichton-Stuart	Liberal
== B ==
Constituency	MP	Party
Banbury	Charles Eurwicke Douglas	Independent Liberal
Bandon	William Smyth Bernard	Conservative
Banffshire	Lachlan Gordon-Duff	Liberal
Barnstaple (two members)	John Ferguson Davie	Liberal
Barnstaple (two members)	John Laurie	Liberal
Bath (two members)	Sir William Tite	Liberal
Bath (two members)	Arthur Edwin Way	Conservative
Beaumaris	William Owen Stanley	Liberal
Bedford (two members)	Samuel Whitbread	Liberal
Bedford (two members)	William Stuart	Conservative
Bedfordshire (two members)	Francis Russell	Liberal
Bedfordshire (two members)	Richard Gilpin	Conservative
Belfast (two members)	Richard Davison	Conservative
Belfast (two members)	Hugh Cairns	Conservative
Berkshire (Three members)	Philip Pleydell-Bouverie	Conservative
Berkshire (Three members)	John Walter	Liberal
Berkshire (Three members)	Hon. Philip Pleydell-Bouverie	Liberal
Berwickshire	David Robertson	Liberal
Berwick-upon-Tweed (two members)	Charles William Gordon	Conservative
Berwick-upon-Tweed (two members)	Ralph Earle	Conservative
Beverley (two members)	Ralph Walters	Liberal
Beverley (two members)	Henry Edwards	Conservative
Bewdley	Sir Thomas Winnington, Bt	Liberal
Birmingham (two members)	John Bright	Liberal
Birmingham (two members)	William Scholefield	Liberal
Blackburn	James Pilkington	Liberal
Blackburn	William Henry Hornby	Conservative
Bodmin (two members)	Frederick Leveson-Gower	Liberal
Bodmin (two members)	William Michell	Conservative
Bolton (two members)	Joseph Crook	Liberal
Bolton (two members)	William Gray	Conservative
Boston	Herbert Ingram	Liberal
Boston	Meaburn Staniland	Liberal
Bradford (two members)	Henry Wickham Wickham	Liberal
Bradford (two members)	Titus Salt	Liberal
Brecon	John Lloyd Vaughan Watkins	Liberal
Breconshire	Godfrey Morgan	Conservative
Bridgnorth (two members)	Henry Whitmore	Conservative
Bridgnorth (two members)	John Pritchard	Conservative
Bridgwater (two members)	Charles Kemeys-Tynte	Liberal
Bridgwater (two members)	Alexander William Kinglake	Liberal
Bridport (two members)	Thomas Alexander Mitchell	Liberal
Bridport (two members)	Kirkman Daniel Hodgson	Liberal
Brighton (two members)	Sir George Brooke-Pechell, Bt	Liberal
Brighton (two members)	William Coningham	Liberal
Bristol (two members)	Henry FitzHardinge Berkeley	Liberal
Bristol (two members)	Henry Gore-Langton	Liberal
Buckingham (two members)	John Hubbard	Conservative
Buckingham (two members)	Sir Harry Verney, Bt	Liberal
Buckinghamshire (Three members)	Caledon Du Pré	Conservative
Buckinghamshire (Three members)	William Cavendish	Liberal
Buckinghamshire (Three members)	Benjamin Disraeli	Conservative
Bury	Frederick Peel	Liberal
Bury St Edmunds (two members)	Alfred Hervey	Conservative
Bury St Edmunds (two members)	Joseph Hardcastle	Liberal
Buteshire	David Mure	Conservative
== C ==
Constituency	MP	Party
Caernarvon	Charles Wynne	Conservative
Caernarvonshire	Edward Douglas-Pennant	Conservative
Caithness	George Traill	Liberal
Calne	Robert Lowe	Liberal
Cambridge (two members)	Kenneth Macaulay	Conservative
Cambridge (two members)	Andrew Steuart	Conservative
Cambridge University (two members)	Charles Jasper Selwyn	Conservative
Cambridge University (two members)	Spencer Horatio Walpole	Conservative
Cambridgeshire (Three members)	Hon. Eliot Yorke	Conservative
Cambridgeshire (Three members)	Edward Ball	Conservative
Cambridgeshire (Three members)	Henry John Adeane	Liberal
Canterbury (two members)	Sir William Somerville, Bt	Liberal
Canterbury (two members)	Henry Butler-Johnstone	Conservative
Cardiff	James Crichton-Stuart	Liberal
Cardigan	Edward Pryse	Liberal
Cardiganshire	William Thomas Rowland Powell	Conservative
Carlisle (two members)	Sir James Graham, Bt	Liberal
Carlisle (two members)	Wilfrid Lawson	Liberal
Carlow	Sir John Acton	Liberal
County Carlow (two members)	William McClintock-Bunbury	Conservative
County Carlow (two members)	Henry Bruen	Conservative
Carmarthen	David Morris	Liberal
Carmarthenshire (two members)	David Pugh	Liberal-Conservative
Carmarthenshire (two members)	David Jones	Conservative
Carrickfergus	Robert Torrens	Conservative
Cashel	John Lanigan	Liberal
Cavan (two members)	Hon. James Maxwell	Conservative
Cavan (two members)	Hon. Hugh Annesley	Conservative
Chatham	Sir Frederick Smith	Conservative
Cheltenham	Francis Berkeley	Liberal
Cheshire North (two members)	Wilbraham Egerton	Conservative
Cheshire North (two members)	George Cornwall Legh	Conservative
Cheshire South (two members)	Sir Philip Grey Egerton, Bt	Conservative
Cheshire South (two members)	John Tollemache	Conservative
Chester (two members)	Earl Grosvenor	Liberal
Chester (two members)	Philip Stapleton Humberston	Conservative
Chichester (two members)	Humphrey William Freeland	Liberal
Chichester (two members)	Lord Henry Lennox	Conservative
Chippenham (two members)	Richard Penruddocke Long	Conservative
Chippenham (two members)	William John Lysley	Liberal
Christchurch	John Edward Walcott	Conservative
Cirencester (two members)	Ashley Ponsonby	Liberal
Cirencester (two members)	Allen Bathurst	Conservative
Clackmannanshire and Kinross-shire	William Patrick Adam	Liberal
Clare (two members)	Crofton Moore Vandeleur	Conservative
Clare (two members)	Luke White	Liberal
Clitheroe	John Turner Hopwood	Liberal
Clonmel	John Bagwell	Liberal
Cockermouth (two members)	John Steel	Liberal
Cockermouth (two members)	Lord Naas	Conservative
Colchester (two members)	Philip Oxenden Papillon	Conservative
Colchester (two members)	Taverner John Miller	Conservative
Coleraine	John Boyd	Conservative
Cork City (two members)	William Trant Fagan	Liberal
Cork City (two members)	Francis Beamish	Liberal
County Cork (two members)	Rickard Deasy	Liberal
County Cork (two members)	Vincent Scully	Liberal
East Cornwall (two members)	Thomas Agar-Robartes	Liberal
East Cornwall (two members)	Nicholas Kendall	Conservative
West Cornwall (two members)	John St Aubyn	Liberal
West Cornwall (two members)	Richard Davey	Liberal
Coventry (two members)	Edward Ellice	Liberal
Coventry (two members)	Sir Joseph Paxton	Liberal
Cricklade (two members)	Anthony Ashley-Cooper	Liberal
Cricklade (two members)	Ambrose Goddard	Conservative
East Cumberland (two members)	Hon. Charles Howard	Liberal
East Cumberland (two members)	William Marshall	Liberal
West Cumberland (two members)	Henry Lowther	Conservative
West Cumberland (two members)	Sir Henry Wyndham	Conservative
== D ==
Constituency	MP	Party
Dartmouth	Edward Wyndham Harrington Schenley	Liberal
Denbigh Boroughs	Townshend Mainwaring	Conservative
Denbighshire (two members)	Sir Watkin Williams Wynn, Bt	Conservative
Denbighshire (two members)	Robert Myddleton-Biddulph	Liberal
Derby (two members)	Michael Thomas Bass	Liberal
Derby (two members)	Samuel Beale	Liberal
Derbyshire North (two members)	Lord George Cavendish	Liberal
Derbyshire North (two members)	William Pole Thornhill	Liberal
Derbyshire South (two members)	William Mundy	Conservative
Derbyshire South (two members)	Thomas Evans	Liberal
Devizes (two members)	John Neilson Gladstone	Conservative
Devizes (two members)	Christopher Darby Griffith	Conservative
Devonport (two members)	Sir Thomas Erskine Perry	Liberal
Devonport (two members)	James Wilson	Liberal
North Devon (two members)	James Wentworth Buller	Liberal
North Devon (two members)	Hon. Charles Hepburn-Stuart-Forbes-Trefusis	Conservative
South Devon (two members)	Samuel Trehawke Kekewich	Conservative
South Devon (two members)	Sir Lawrence Palk, Bt	Conservative
Donegal (two members)	Sir Edmund Hayes, Bt	Conservative
Donegal (two members)	Thomas Conolly	Conservative
Dorchester (two members)	Richard Brinsley Sheridan	Liberal
Dorchester (two members)	Charles Sturt	Conservative
Dorset (Three members)	Henry Ker Seymer	Conservative
Dorset (Three members)	Henry Sturt	Conservative
Dorset (Three members)	Hon. Henry Portman	Liberal
Dover (two members)	Henry John Leeke	Conservative
Dover (two members)	William Nicol	Conservative
Down (two members)	Lord Edwin Hill	Conservative
Down (two members)	William Brownlow Forde	Conservative
Downpatrick	David Stewart Ker	Conservative
Drogheda	James McCann	Liberal
Droitwich	Sir John Pakington, Bt	Conservative
Dublin (two members)	Edward Grogan	Conservative
Dublin (two members)	John Vance	Conservative
County Dublin (two members)	James Hans Hamilton	Conservative
County Dublin (two members)	Thomas Edward Taylor	Conservative
Dublin University (two members)	Anthony Lefroy	Conservative
Dublin University (two members)	James Whiteside	Conservative
Dudley	Henry Brinsley Sheridan	Liberal
Dumfries	William Ewart	Liberal
Dumfriesshire	John Hope-Johnstone	Conservative
Dunbartonshire	Patrick Smollett	Conservative
Dundalk	George Bowyer	Liberal
Dundee	Sir John Ogilvy, Bt	Liberal
Dungannon	William Knox	Conservative
Dungarvan	John Maguire	Liberal
Durham City (two members)	Sir William Atherton	Liberal
Durham City (two members)	John Mowbray	Conservative
North Durham (two members)	Robert Duncombe Shafto	Liberal
North Durham (two members)	Lord Adolphus Vane-Tempest	Conservative
South Durham (two members)	James Farrer	Conservative
South Durham (two members)	Henry Pease	Liberal
== E ==
Constituency	MP	Party
East Retford (two members)	The Viscount Galway	Conservative
East Retford (two members)	Francis Foljambe	Liberal
Edinburgh (two members)	James Moncreiff	Liberal
Edinburgh (two members)	Adam Black	Liberal
Elgin	M. E. Grant Duff	Liberal
Elginshire and Nairnshire	Charles Cumming-Bruce	Conservative
Ennis	John FitzGerald	Liberal
Enniskillen	John Lowry Cole	Conservative
Essex North (two members)	William Beresford	Conservative
Essex North (two members)	Charles du Cane	Conservative
Essex South (two members)	Thomas William Bramston	Conservative
Essex South (two members)	John Perry-Watlington	Conservative
Evesham (two members)	Sir Henry Willoughby, Bt	Conservative
Evesham (two members)	Edward Holland	Liberal
Exeter (two members)	Edward Divett	Liberal
Exeter (two members)	Richard Sommers Gard	Conservative
Eye	Sir Edward Kerrison, Bt	Conservative
== F ==
Constituency	MP	Party
Falkirk Burghs	James Merry	Liberal
Fermanagh (two members)	Mervyn Edward Archdall	Conservative
Fermanagh (two members)	Henry Cole	Conservative
Fife	James Hay Erskine Wemyss	Liberal
Finsbury (two members)	Thomas Slingsby Duncombe	Liberal
Finsbury (two members)	Morton Peto	Liberal
Flint	Sir John Hanmer, Bt	Liberal
Flintshire	Thomas Lloyd-Mostyn	Liberal
Forfarshire	Viscount Duncan	Liberal
Frome	Edward Thynne	Conservative
== G ==
Constituency	MP	Party
Galway Borough (two members)	John Orrell Lever	Conservative
Galway Borough (two members)	Lord Dunkellin	Liberal
County Galway (two members)	Sir Thomas Burke, 3rd Bt	Liberal
County Galway (two members)	William Henry Gregory	Liberal
Gateshead	Sir William Hutt	Liberal
Glamorganshire (two members)	Christopher Rice Mansel Talbot	Liberal
Glamorganshire (two members)	Henry Vivian	Liberal
Glasgow (two members)	Walter Buchanan	Liberal
Glasgow (two members)	Robert Dalglish	Liberal
Gloucester (two members)	William Philip Price	Liberal
Gloucester (two members)	Charles James Monk	Liberal
Gloucestershire East (two members)	Sir Christopher William Codrington	Conservative
Gloucestershire East (two members)	Robert Stayner Holford	Conservative
Gloucestershire West (two members)	Robert Kingscote	Liberal
Gloucestershire West (two members)	Sir John Rolt	Conservative
Grantham (two members)	William Welby-Gregory	Conservative
Grantham (two members)	Hon. Frederick Tollemache	Liberal
Great Grimsby	Viscount Worsley	Liberal
Great Marlow	Thomas Peers Williams	Conservative
Great Marlow	Brownlow William Knox	Conservative
Great Yarmouth (two members)	Edmund Lacon	Conservative
Great Yarmouth (two members)	Henry Stracey	Conservative
Greenock	Alexander Murray Dunlop	Liberal
Greenwich (two members)	David Salomons	Liberal
Greenwich (two members)	William Angerstein	Liberal
Guildford (two members)	Guildford Onslow	Liberal
Guildford (two members)	William Bovill	Conservative
== H ==
Constituency	MP	Party
Haddington	Sir Henry Ferguson-Davie, Bt	Liberal
Haddingtonshire	Lord Elcho	Conservative
Halifax (two members)	Sir Charles Wood, Bt	Liberal
Halifax (two members)	James Stansfeld	Liberal
Hampshire North (two members)	William Wither Bramston Beach	Conservative
Hampshire North (two members)	George Sclater-Booth	Conservative
Hampshire South (two members)	Sir Jervoise Clarke-Jervois, Bt	Liberal
Hampshire South (two members)	Hon. Ralph Dutton	Conservative
Harwich (two members)	Henry Jervis-White-Jervis	Conservative
Harwich (two members)	William Campbell	Liberal
Hastings (two members)	Harry Vane	Liberal
Hastings (two members)	Frederick North	Liberal
Haverfordwest	John Scourfield	Conservative
Helston	John Jope Rogers	Conservative
Hereford (two members)	Henry Morgan-Clifford	Liberal
Hereford (two members)	George Clive	Liberal
Herefordshire (Three members)	Montagu Graham	Conservative
Herefordshire (Three members)	James King King	Conservative
Herefordshire (Three members)	Humphrey Francis St John-Mildmay	Liberal
Hertford (two members)	Hon. William Cowper-Temple	Liberal
Hertford (two members)	Sir Walter Townshend-Farquhar, Bt	Conservative
Hertfordshire (Three members)	Abel Smith	Conservative
Hertfordshire (Three members)	Sir Edward Bulwer-Lytton, Bt	Conservative
Hertfordshire (Three members)	Christopher William Puller	Liberal
Honiton (two members)	Joseph Locke	Liberal
Honiton (two members)	Alexander Baillie-Cochrane	Conservative
Horsham	William Vesey-FitzGerald	Conservative
Huddersfield	Edward Leatham	Liberal
Huntingdon (two members)	Jonathan Peel	Conservative
Huntingdon (two members)	Thomas Baring	Conservative
Huntingdonshire (two members)	Edward Fellowes	Conservative
Huntingdonshire (two members)	Robert Montagu	Conservative
Hythe	Mayer Amschel de Rothschild	Liberal
== I ==
Constituency	MP	Party
Inverness Burghs	Alexander Matheson	Liberal
Inverness-shire	Henry Baillie	Conservative
Ipswich (two members)	John Cobbold	Conservative
Ipswich (two members)	Hugh Adair	Liberal
Isle of Wight	Charles Clifford	Liberal
== K ==
Constituency	MP	Party
Kendal	George Glyn	Liberal
Kent East (two members)	William Deedes	Conservative
Kent East (two members)	Sir Brook Bridges, Bt	Conservative
Kent West (two members)	Edmund Filmer	Conservative
Kent West (two members)	Viscount Holmesdale	Conservative
Kerry (two members)	Henry Arthur Herbert	Liberal
Kerry (two members)	Valentine Browne	Liberal
Kidderminster	Alfred Rhodes Bristow	Liberal
Kildare (two members)	William H. F. Cogan	Liberal
Kildare (two members)	Richard More O'Ferrall	Liberal
Kilkenny City	Michael Sullivan	Liberal
County Kilkenny (two members)	John Greene	Liberal
County Kilkenny (two members)	Hon. Leopold Agar-Ellis	Liberal
Kilmarnock	Hon. Edward Pleydell-Bouverie	Liberal
Kincardineshire	Hon. Hugh Arbuthnott	Conservative
King's County (two members)	Patrick O'Brien	Liberal
King's County (two members)	John Pope Hennessy	Conservative
King's Lynn (two members)	Lord Stanley	Conservative
King's Lynn (two members)	John Henry Gurney	Liberal
Kingston upon Hull (two members)	James Clay	Liberal
Kingston upon Hull (two members)	Joseph Hoare	Conservative
Kinsale	John Arnott	Liberal
Kirkcaldy District of Burghs	Robert Ferguson	Liberal
Kirkcudbright	James Mackie	Liberal
Knaresborough (two members)	Basil Thomas Woodd	Conservative
Knaresborough (two members)	Thomas Collins	Conservative
== L ==
Constituency	MP	Party
Lambeth (two members)	William Williams	Liberal
Lambeth (two members)	William Roupell	Liberal
Lanarkshire	Sir Thomas Colebrooke, Bt	Liberal
Lancashire North (two members)	John Wilson-Patten	Conservative
Lancashire North (two members)	Lord Cavendish of Keighley	Liberal
Lancashire South (two members)	Algernon Egerton	Conservative
Lancashire South (two members)	William Legh	Conservative
Lancaster (two members)	Samuel Gregson	Liberal
Lancaster (two members)	William Garnett	Conservative
Launceston	Thomas Chandler Haliburton	Conservative
Leeds (two members)	Edward Baines	Liberal
Leeds (two members)	George Skirrow Beecroft	Conservative
Leicester (two members)	John Biggs	Liberal
Leicester (two members)	Joseph William Noble	Liberal
Leicestershire North (two members)	Edward Bourchier Hartopp	Conservative
Leicestershire North (two members)	Lord John Manners	Conservative
Leicestershire South (two members)	Charles William Packe	Conservative
Leicestershire South (two members)	Viscount Curzon	Conservative
Leith Burghs	William Miller	Liberal
Leitrim (two members)	William Ormsby-Gore	Conservative
Leitrim (two members)	John Brady	Liberal
Leominster (two members)	Gathorne Hardy	Conservative
Leominster (two members)	Charles Bateman-Hanbury	Conservative
Lewes (two members)	Hon. Henry FitzRoy	Liberal
Lewes (two members)	Hon. Henry Brand	Liberal
Lichfield (two members)	Lord Alfred Paget	Liberal
Lichfield (two members)	Augustus Anson	Liberal
Limerick City (two members)	Francis William Russell	Liberal
Limerick City (two members)	George Gavin	Liberal
County Limerick (two members)	William Monsell	Liberal
County Limerick (two members)	Samuel Auchmuty Dickson	Conservative
Lincoln (two members)	George Heneage	Liberal
Lincoln (two members)	Gervaise Sibthorp	Conservative
Lincolnshire North (two members)	James Stanhope	Conservative
Lincolnshire North (two members)	Sir Montague Cholmeley, Bt	Liberal
Lincolnshire South (two members)	Sir John Trollope, Bt	Conservative
Lincolnshire South (two members)	George Hussey Packe	Liberal
Linlithgowshire	Walter Ferrier Hamilton	Liberal
Lisburn	Jonathan Richardson	Conservative
Liskeard	Ralph Grey	Liberal
Liverpool (two members)	Thomas Horsfall	Conservative
Liverpool (two members)	Joseph Christopher Ewart	Liberal
The City London (Four members)	Lord John Russell	Liberal
The City London (Four members)	Baron Lionel de Rothschild	Liberal
The City London (Four members)	Sir James Duke, Bt	Liberal
The City London (Four members)	Robert Wigram Crawford	Liberal
Londonderry City	Sir Robert Ferguson, Bt	Liberal
County Londonderry (two members)	Robert Peel Dawson	Conservative
County Londonderry (two members)	Frederick Heygate	Conservative
County Longford (two members)	Fulke Greville-Nugent	Liberal
County Longford (two members)	Henry White	Liberal
County Louth (two members)	Chichester Fortescue	Liberal
County Louth (two members)	Richard Bellew	Liberal
Ludlow (two members)	Hon. Percy Egerton Herbert	Conservative
Ludlow (two members)	Beriah Botfield	Conservative
Lyme Regis	William Pinney	Liberal
Lymington (two members)	Sir John Rivett-Carnac, Bt	Conservative
Lymington (two members)	William Alexander Mackinnon	Liberal
== M ==
Constituency	MP	Party
Macclesfield (two members)	John Brocklehurst	Liberal
Macclesfield (two members)	Edward Egerton	Conservative
Maidstone (two members)	William Lee	Liberal
Maidstone (two members)	James Whatman	Liberal
Maldon (two members)	George Sandford	Conservative
Maldon (two members)	Thomas Western	Liberal
Mallow	Robert Longfield	Conservative
Malmesbury	Henry Howard	Liberal
Malton (two members)	Hon. Charles Wentworth-Fitzwilliam	Liberal
Malton (two members)	James Brown	Liberal
Manchester (two members)	Thomas Bazley	Liberal
Manchester (two members)	James Aspinall Turner	Liberal
Marlborough (two members)	Lord Ernest Brudenell-Bruce	Liberal
Marlborough (two members)	Henry Bingham Baring	Liberal
Marylebone (two members)	Sir Benjamin Hall, Bt	Liberal
Marylebone (two members)	Edwin James	Liberal
Mayo (two members)	John Browne	Liberal
Mayo (two members)	Roger Palmer	Conservative
Meath (two members)	Matthew Corbally	Liberal
Meath (two members)	Edward McEvoy	Liberal
Merioneth	William Wynne	Conservative
Merthyr Tydvil	Henry Bruce	Liberal
Middlesex (two members)	George Byng	Liberal
Middlesex (two members)	Robert Hanbury	Liberal
Midhurst	William Townley Mitford	Conservative
Midlothian	William Montagu Douglas Scott	Conservative
Monaghan (two members)	Charles Powell Leslie III	Conservative
Monaghan (two members)	Sir George Forster, Bt	Conservative
Monmouth Boroughs	Crawshay Bailey	Conservative
Monmouthshire (two members)	Octavius Morgan	Conservative
Monmouthshire (two members)	Edward Arthur Somerset	Conservative
Montgomery	David Pugh	Conservative
Montgomeryshire	Herbert Williams-Wynn	Conservative
Montrose	William Edward Baxter	Liberal
Morpeth	Sir George Grey, Bt	Liberal
== N ==
Constituency	MP	Party
Newark (two members)	Grosvenor Hodgkinson	Liberal
Newark (two members)	John Handley	Liberal
Newcastle-under-Lyme (two members)	William Murray	Conservative
Newcastle-under-Lyme (two members)	William Jackson	Liberal
Newcastle-upon-Tyne (two members)	Thomas Emerson Headlam	Liberal
Newcastle-upon-Tyne (two members)	George Ridley	Liberal
Newport (two members)	Robert Kennard	Conservative
Newport (two members)	Philip Lybbe Powys Lybbe	Conservative
New Ross	Charles Tottenham	Conservative
Newry	Peter Quinn	Conservative
New Shoreham (two members)	Sir Charles Burrell, Bt	Conservative
New Shoreham (two members)	Stephen Cave	Conservative
Norfolk East (two members)	Wenman Coke	Liberal
Norfolk East (two members)	Edward Howes	Conservative
Norfolk West (two members)	George Bentinck	Conservative
Norfolk West (two members)	Brampton Gurdon	Liberal
Northallerton	William Battie-Wrightson	Liberal
Northampton (two members)	Robert Vernon	Liberal
Northampton (two members)	Charles Gilpin	Liberal
North Northamptonshire (two members)	George Ward Hunt	Conservative
North Northamptonshire (two members)	Lord Burghley	Conservative
South Northamptonshire (two members)	Rainald Knightley	Conservative
South Northamptonshire (two members)	Henry Cartwright	Conservative
Northumberland North (two members)	Matthew White Ridley	Conservative
Northumberland North (two members)	Lord Lovaine	Conservative
Northumberland South (two members)	Wentworth Beaumont	Liberal
Northumberland South (two members)	Lord Eslington	Conservative
Norwich (two members)	Henry Schneider	Liberal
Norwich (two members)	Viscount Bury	Liberal
Nottingham (two members)	John Mellor	Liberal
Nottingham (two members)	Charles Paget	Liberal
Nottinghamshire North (two members)	Lord Robert Pelham-Clinton	Liberal
Nottinghamshire North (two members)	Sir Evelyn Denison	Liberal
Nottinghamshire South (two members)	William Hodgson Barrow	Conservative
Nottinghamshire South (two members)	Viscount Newark	Conservative
== O ==
Constituency	MP	Party
Oldham (two members)	John Morgan Cobbett	Liberal
Oldham (two members)	William Johnson Fox	Liberal
Orkney and Shetland	Frederick Dundas	Liberal
Oxford (two members)	James Haughton Langston	Liberal
Oxford (two members)	Edward Cardwell	Liberal
Oxfordshire (Three members)	George Harcourt	Liberal
Oxfordshire (Three members)	J. W. Henley	Conservative
Oxfordshire (Three members)	John North	Conservative
Oxford University (two members)	William Ewart Gladstone	Conservative
Oxford University (two members)	Sir William Heathcote, Bt	Conservative
== P ==
Constituency	MP	Party
Paisley	Humphrey Crum-Ewing	Liberal
Peeblesshire	Sir Graham Graham-Montgomery, Bt	Conservative
Pembroke	Sir John Owen, Bt	Liberal
Pembrokeshire	Viscount Emlyn	Conservative
Penryn and Falmouth (two members)	Thomas Baring	Liberal
Penryn and Falmouth (two members)	Samuel Gurney	Independent Liberal
Perth	Arthur Kinnaird	Liberal
Perthshire	Sir William Stirling-Maxwell, Bt	Conservative
Peterborough (two members)	George Hammond Whalley	Liberal
Peterborough (two members)	Thomson Hankey	Liberal
Petersfield	Sir William Joliffe, Bt	Conservative
Plymouth (two members)	Robert Collier	Liberal
Plymouth (two members)	William Edgcumbe	Conservative
Pontefract (two members)	Richard Monckton Milnes	Liberal
Pontefract (two members)	William Overend	Conservative
Poole (two members)	Henry Danby Seymour	Liberal
Poole (two members)	George Franklyn	Conservative
Portarlington	Lionel Dawson-Damer	Conservative
Portsmouth (two members)	Sir Francis Baring, Bt	Liberal
Portsmouth (two members)	Sir James Dalrymple-Horn-Elphinstone, Bt	Conservative
Preston (two members)	Charles Grenfell	Liberal
Preston (two members)	R. A. Cross	Conservative
== Q ==
Constituency	MP	Party
Queen's County (two members)	Michael Dunne	Liberal
Queen's County (two members)	Francis Plunkett Dunne	Conservative
== R ==
Constituency	MP	Party
Radnor	Sir George Cornewall Lewis, Bt	Liberal
Radnorshire	Sir John Walsh, Bt	Conservative
Reading (two members)	Francis Piggott	Liberal
Reading (two members)	Sir Henry Singer Keating	Liberal
Reigate	William Monson	Liberal
Renfrewshire	Sir Michael Shaw-Stewart, Bt	Conservative
Richmond (two members)	Henry Rich	Liberal
Richmond (two members)	Marmaduke Wyvill	Liberal
Ripon (two members)	John Greenwood	Liberal
Ripon (two members)	John Ashley Warre	Liberal
Rochdale	Richard Cobden	Liberal
Rochester (two members)	Philip Wykeham-Martin	Liberal
Rochester (two members)	John Alexander Kinglake	Liberal
Roscommon (two members)	Fitzstephen French	Liberal
Roscommon (two members)	Thomas William Goff	Conservative
Ross and Cromarty	Sir James Matheson, Bt	Liberal
Roxburghshire	William Scott	Liberal
Rutland (two members)	Hon. Gerard Noel	Conservative
Rutland (two members)	Hon. Gilbert Heathcote	Liberal
Rye	William Alexander Mackinnon	Liberal
== S ==
Constituency	MP	Party
St Andrews	Edward Ellice	Liberal
St Ives	Henry Paull	Conservative
Salford	William Nathaniel Massey	Liberal
Salisbury (two members)	Edward Pery Buckley	Liberal
Salisbury (two members)	Matthew Henry Marsh	Liberal
Sandwich (two members)	Edward Knatchbull-Hugessen	Liberal
Sandwich (two members)	Lord Clarence Paget	Liberal
Scarborough (two members)	Sir John Vanden-Bempde-Johnstone, Bt	Liberal
Scarborough (two members)	William Denison	Liberal
Selkirkshire	Allan Eliott-Lockhart	Conservative
Shaftesbury	George Glyn	Liberal
Sheffield (two members)	John Arthur Roebuck	Independent Liberal
Sheffield (two members)	George Hadfield	Liberal
Shrewsbury (two members)	George Tomline	Liberal
Shrewsbury (two members)	Robert Aglionby Slaney	Liberal
Shropshire North (two members)	John Ormsby-Gore	Conservative
Shropshire North (two members)	Hon. Rowland Hill	Conservative
Shropshire South (two members)	Viscount Newport	Conservative
Shropshire South (two members)	Hon. Robert Windsor-Clive	Conservative
Sligo	John Arthur Wynne	Conservative
County Sligo (two members)	Sir Robert Gore-Booth, Bt	Conservative
County Sligo (two members)	Edward Henry Cooper	Conservative
Somerset East (two members)	William Miles	Conservative
Somerset East (two members)	William Knatchbull	Conservative
Somerset West (two members)	Charles Moody	Conservative
Somerset West (two members)	Alexander Fuller-Acland-Hood	Conservative
Southampton (two members)	Brodie McGhie Willcox	Liberal
Southampton (two members)	William Digby Seymour	Liberal
South Shields	Robert Ingham	Liberal
Southwark (two members)	Sir Charles Napier	Liberal
Southwark (two members)	John Locke	Liberal
Stafford (two members)	John Ayshford Wise	Liberal
Stafford (two members)	Thomas Salt	Conservative
Staffordshire North (two members)	Charles Adderley	Conservative
Staffordshire North (two members)	Charles Chetwynd-Talbot	Conservative
Staffordshire South (two members)	William Orme Foster	Liberal
Staffordshire South (two members)	Henry Hodgetts-Foley	Liberal
Stamford (two members)	Stafford Northcote	Conservative
Stamford (two members)	Lord Robert Cecil	Conservative
Stirling	James Caird	Liberal
Stirlingshire	Peter Blackburn	Conservative
Stockport (two members)	James Kershaw	Liberal
Stockport (two members)	John Benjamin Smith	Liberal
Stoke-upon-Trent (two members)	John Lewis Ricardo	Liberal
Stoke-upon-Trent (two members)	William Taylor Copeland	Conservative
Stroud (two members)	George Poulett Scrope	Liberal
Stroud (two members)	Edward Horsman	Liberal
Suffolk East (two members)	Sir Fitzroy Kelly	Conservative
Suffolk East (two members)	The Lord Henniker	Conservative
Suffolk West (two members)	Frederick Hervey	Conservative
Suffolk West (two members)	William Parker	Conservative
Sunderland (two members)	William Schaw Lindsay	Liberal
Sunderland (two members)	Henry Fenwick	Liberal
Surrey East (two members)	Hon. Peter King	Liberal
Surrey East (two members)	Thomas Alcock	Liberal
Surrey West (two members)	Henry Drummond	Conservative
Surrey West (two members)	John Ivatt Briscoe	Liberal
Sussex East (two members)	Viscount Pevensey	Conservative
Sussex East (two members)	John George Dodson	Liberal
Sussex West (two members)	The Earl of March	Conservative
Sussex West (two members)	Henry Wyndham	Conservative
Sutherland	The Marquess of Stafford	Liberal
Swansea District	Lewis Llewelyn Dillwyn	Liberal
== T ==
Constituency	MP	Party
Tamworth (two members)	Sir Robert Peel, Bt	Liberal
Tamworth (two members)	Viscount Raynham	Liberal
Taunton (two members)	Henry Labouchere	Liberal
Taunton (two members)	Arthur Mills	Conservative
Tavistock (two members)	Arthur Russell	Liberal
Tavistock (two members)	Sir John Salusbury-Trelawny, Bt	Liberal
Tewkesbury (two members)	James Martin	Liberal
Tewkesbury (two members)	Hon. Frederick Lygon	Conservative
Thetford (two members)	The Earl of Euston	Liberal
Thetford (two members)	Alexander Baring	Conservative
Thirsk	Sir William Payne-Gallwey, Bt	Conservative
Tipperary (two members)	Daniel O'Donoghue	Liberal
Tipperary (two members)	Laurence Waldron	Liberal
Tiverton (two members)	George Denman	Liberal
Tiverton (two members)	The Viscount Palmerston	Liberal
Totnes (two members)	Thomas Mills	Liberal
Totnes (two members)	The Earl of Gifford	Liberal
Tower Hamlets (two members)	Charles Salisbury Butler	Liberal
Tower Hamlets (two members)	Acton Smee Ayrton	Liberal
Tralee	Daniel O'Connell	Liberal
Truro (two members)	Augustus Smith	Liberal
Truro (two members)	Montague Edward Smith	Conservative
Tynemouth and North Shields	Hugh Taylor	Conservative
Tyrone (two members)	Hon. Henry Lowry-Corry	Conservative
Tyrone (two members)	Lord Claud Hamilton	Conservative
== W ==
Constituency	MP	Party
Wakefield	William Henry Leatham	Liberal
Wallingford	Richard Malins	Conservative
Walsall	Charles Forster	Liberal
Wareham	John Erle-Drax	Conservative
Warrington	Gilbert Greenall	Conservative
Warwick (two members)	George Repton	Conservative
Warwick (two members)	Edward Greaves	Conservative
Warwickshire North (two members)	Charles Newdigate Newdegate	Conservative
Warwickshire North (two members)	Richard Spooner	Conservative
Warwickshire South (two members)	Evelyn Shirley	Conservative
Warwickshire South (two members)	Sir Charles Mordaunt	Conservative
Waterford City (two members)	John Aloysius Blake	Liberal
Waterford City (two members)	Michael D. Hassard	Conservative
County Waterford (two members)	Walter Talbot	Conservative
County Waterford (two members)	Sir John Esmonde, Bt	Liberal
Wells (two members)	William Hayter	Liberal
Wells (two members)	Hedworth Jolliffe	Conservative
Wenlock (two members)	Hon. George Weld-Forester	Conservative
Wenlock (two members)	James Milnes Gaskell	Conservative
Westbury	Sir Massey Lopes, Bt	Conservative
Westmeath (two members)	William Pollard-Urquhart	Liberal
Westmeath (two members)	Sir Richard Levinge, Bt	Liberal
Westminster (two members)	Sir De Lacy Evans	Liberal
Westminster (two members)	Sir John Shelley, Bt	Liberal
Westmorland (two members)	Hon. Henry Lowther	Conservative
Westmorland (two members)	The Earl of Bective	Conservative
Wexford	John Redmond	Liberal
County Wexford (two members)	Patrick McMahon	Liberal
County Wexford (two members)	John George	Conservative
Weymouth and Melcombe Regis (two members)	Robert Brooks	Conservative
Weymouth and Melcombe Regis (two members)	Arthur Egerton	Conservative
Whitby	Robert Stephenson	Conservative
Whitehaven	George Lyall	Conservative
Wick District	Samuel Laing	Liberal
Wicklow (two members)	Granville Proby	Liberal
Wicklow (two members)	William Wentworth-FitzWilliam-Hume	Conservative
Wigan (two members)	James Lindsay	Conservative
Wigan (two members)	Henry Woods	Liberal
Wigtown Burghs	Sir William Dunbar, Bt	Liberal
Wigtownshire	Sir Andrew Agnew, Bt	Liberal
Wilton	Sir Edmund Antrobus, Bt	Liberal
Wiltshire North (two members)	Walter Long	Conservative
Wiltshire North (two members)	T. H. S. Sotheron-Estcourt	Conservative
Wiltshire South (two members)	Sidney Herbert	Liberal
Wiltshire South (two members)	Henry Thynne	Conservative
Winchester (two members)	Sir James Buller East, Bt	Conservative
Winchester (two members)	John Bonham-Carter	Liberal
Windsor (two members)	George William Hope	Conservative
Windsor (two members)	William Vansittart	Conservative
Wolverhampton (two members)	Hon. Charles Pelham Villiers	Liberal
Wolverhampton (two members)	Richard Bethell	Liberal
Woodstock	Alfred Spencer-Churchill	Conservative
Worcester (two members)	Osman Ricardo	Liberal
Worcester (two members)	William Laslett	Liberal
Worcestershire East (two members)	Frederick Gough-Calthorpe	Liberal
Worcestershire East (two members)	John Hodgetts-Foley	Liberal
Worcestershire West (two members)	Frederick Knight	Conservative
Worcestershire West (two members)	Viscount Elmley	Conservative
Wycombe (two members)	Sir George Dashwood, Bt	Liberal
Wycombe (two members)	Martin Tucker Smith	Liberal
== Y ==
Constituency	MP	Party
York (two members)	John George Smyth	Conservative
York (two members)	Joshua Westhead	Liberal
East Riding of Yorkshire (two members)	The Lord Hotham	Conservative
East Riding of Yorkshire (two members)	Hon. Arthur Duncombe	Conservative
North Riding of Yorkshire (two members)	Edward Stillingfleet Cayley	Liberal
North Riding of Yorkshire (two members)	Hon. Octavius Duncombe	Conservative
West Riding of Yorkshire (two members)	John Ramsden	Liberal
West Riding of Yorkshire (two members)	Francis Crossley	Liberal
Youghal	Isaac Butt	Liberal

== See also ==
- 1857 United Kingdom general election
- List of parliaments of the United Kingdom
