= List of United Kingdom Parliament constituencies (1832–1868) =

Constituencies in 1801–1832 | 1832 MPs | 1835 MPs | 1837 MPs | 1841 MPs | 1847 MPs | 1852 MPs | 1857 MPs | 1859 MPs | 1865 MPs | Constituencies in 1865–1868

This is a list of parliamentary constituencies which were used for elections to the House of Commons of the Parliament of the United Kingdom from 1832 to 1865.

These constituencies were defined by the Representation of the People Act 1832 (commonly known as the Reform Act 1832), and with the exception of the changes listed below they remained in effect until the next round of revisions in 1867 and 1868, when three pieces of legislation restructured the constituencies:

- Representation of the People Act 1867, known as the Reform Act 1867, which redistributed seats in England and Wales
- Representation of the People (Scotland) Act 1868, created seven additional Scottish seats to replace seven disenfranchised English boroughs
- Representation of the People (Ireland) Act 1868, which did not create or abolish any constituencies, but changed some boundaries

== Types of constituency ==
There were three types of constituency, each with different arrangements for the franchise:

- Counties, which covered the whole of a county. In some cases they were divided into two or more divisions
- University constituencies, which had no geographical basis. Their electorate comprised the graduates of the university
- Parliamentary boroughs, known in Scotland as burghs, which comprised a town and in some cases some areas outside the town boundaries.
  - Districts of burghs (in Scotland) and districts of boroughs (in Wales) were a type of borough constituency in which several boroughs jointly elected one Member of Parliament. The areas were not geographically contiguous, and in some cases the boroughs were in different counties

== Numbers by type ==
This table lists the number of each type of constituency in use in 1832, in the four constituent countries of the United Kingdom:

Country	Borough constituencies	County constituencies	University constituencies	Total constituencies	Borough MPs	County MPs	University MP	Total MPs
England	186	68	2	256	322	142	4	468
Wales	15	13	0	28	15	17	0	32
Scotland	21	30	0	51	23	30	0	53
Ireland	33	32	1	66	39	64	2	105
Total	255	143	3	401	399	253	6	658

== Changes ==
Year	Change	New total constituencies	New total MPs
1844	Sudbury (2 seats) disenfranchised for corruption	400	656
1852	St Albans (2 seats) disenfranchised for corruption	399	654
1861	Birkenhead (1 seats) enfranchised	400	656
1861	South Lancashire (2 seats) awarded 1 extra seat for a total of 3	400	656
1865	West Riding of Yorkshire (2 seats) divided into: Northern West Riding of Yorkshire (2 seats); Southern West Riding of Yorkshire (2 seats)	400	658

== List of constituencies ==
Constituency	Members	Type	Country	County	Notes
Aberdeen	1	Borough	Scotland	Aberdeenshire	
Aberdeenshire	1	County	Scotland	Aberdeenshire	
Abingdon	1	Borough	England	Berkshire	
Andover	2	Borough	England	Hampshire	
Anglesey	1	County	Wales	Anglesey	
Antrim	2	County	Ireland	Antrim	
Argyllshire	1	County	Scotland	Argyllshire	
Armagh	1	Borough	Ireland	Armagh	
County Armagh	2	County	Ireland	Armagh	
Arundel	1	Borough	England	Sussex	
Ashburton	1	Borough	England	Devon	
Ashton-under-Lyne	1	Borough	England	Lancashire	
Athlone	1	Borough	Ireland	Westmeath & Roscommon	
Aylesbury	2	Borough	England	Buckinghamshire	
Ayr Burghs	1	District	Scotland	Ayrshire	
Ayrshire	1	County	Scotland	Ayrshire	
Banbury	1	Borough	England	Oxfordshire	
Bandon	1	Borough	Ireland	Cork	
Banffshire	1	County	Scotland	Banffshire	
Barnstaple	2	Borough	England	Devon	
Bath	2	Borough	England	Somerset	
Beaumaris Boroughs	1	District	Wales	Anglesey	
Bedford	2	Borough	England	Bedfordshire	
Bedfordshire	2	County	England	Bedfordshire	
Belfast	2	Borough	Ireland	Antrim	
Berkshire	3	County	England	Berkshire	
Berwickshire	1	County	Scotland	Berwickshire	
Berwick-upon-Tweed	2	Borough	England	Northumberland	
Beverley	2	Borough	England	East Riding of Yorkshire	
Bewdley	1	Borough	England	Worcestershire	
Birmingham	2	Borough	England	Warwickshire	
Blackburn	2	Borough	England	Lancashire	
Bodmin	2	Borough	England	Cornwall	
Bolton	2	Borough	England	Lancashire	
Boston	2	Borough	England	Lincolnshire	
Bradford	2	Borough	England	West Riding of Yorkshire	
Brecon	1	Borough	Wales	Breconshire	
Breconshire	1	County	Wales	Breconshire	
Bridgnorth	2	Borough	England	Shropshire	
Bridgwater	2	Borough	England	Somerset	
Bridport	2	Borough	England	Dorset	
Brighton	2	Borough	England	Sussex	
Bristol	2	Borough	England	Gloucestershire/Somerset	
Buckingham	2	Borough	England	Buckinghamshire	
Buckinghamshire	3	County	England	Buckinghamshire	
Bury	1	Borough	England	Lancashire	
Bury St Edmunds	2	Borough	England	Suffolk	
Buteshire	1	County	Scotland	Buteshire	
Caernarvon Boroughs	1	District	Wales	Caernarvonshire	
Caernarvonshire	1	County	Wales	Caernarvonshire	
Caithness	1	County	Scotland	Caithness	
Calne	1	Borough	England	Wiltshire	
Cambridge	2	Borough	England	Cambridgeshire	
Cambridge University	2	University	England	Cambridgeshire	
Cambridgeshire	3	County	England	Cambridgeshire	
Canterbury	2	Borough	England	Kent	
Cardiff District	1	District	Wales	Glamorganshire	
Cardigan District	1	District	Wales	Cardiganshire	
Cardiganshire	1	County	Wales	Cardiganshire	
Carlisle	2	Borough	England	Cumberland	
Carlow	1	Borough	Ireland	Carlow	
County Carlow	2	County	Ireland	Carlow	
Carmarthen	1	District	Wales	Carmarthenshire	
Carmarthenshire	2	County	Wales	Carmarthenshire	
Carrickfergus	1	Borough	Ireland	Antrim	
Cashel	1	Borough	Ireland	Tipperary	
Cavan	2	County	Ireland	Cavan	
Chatham	1	Borough	England	Kent	
Cheltenham	1	Borough	England	Gloucestershire	
Cheshire Northern	2	County	England	Cheshire	
Cheshire Southern	2	County	England	Cheshire	
Chester	2	Borough	England	Cheshire	
Chichester	2	Borough	England	Sussex	
Chippenham	2	Borough	England	Wiltshire	
Christchurch	1	Borough	England	Hampshire	
Cirencester	2	Borough	England	Gloucestershire	
Clackmannanshire and Kinross-shire	1	County	Scotland	Clackmannanshire	
Clare	2	County	Ireland	Clare	
Clitheroe	1	Borough	England	Lancashire	
Clonmel	1	Borough	Ireland	Tipperary	
Cockermouth	2	Borough	England	Cumberland	
Colchester	2	Borough	England	Essex	
Coleraine	1	Borough	Ireland	Londonderry	
Cork City	2	Borough	Ireland	Cork	
County Cork	2	County	Ireland	Cork	
Cornwall Eastern	2	County	England	Cornwall	
Cornwall Western	2	County	England	Cornwall	
Coventry	2	Borough	England	Warwickshire	
Cricklade	2	Borough	England	Wiltshire	
Cumberland Eastern	2	County	England	Cumberland	
Cumberland Western	2	County	England	Cumberland	
Dartmouth	1	Borough	England	Devon	
Denbigh Boroughs	1	District	Wales	Denbighshire	
Denbighshire	2	County	Wales	Denbighshire	
Derby	2	Borough	England	Derbyshire	
Derbyshire Northern	2	County	England	Derbyshire	
Derbyshire Southern	2	County	England	Derbyshire	
Devizes	2	Borough	England	Wiltshire	
Devonport	2	Borough	England	Devon	
Devon Northern	2	County	England	Devon	
Devon Southern	2	County	England	Devon	
Donegal	2	County	Ireland	Donegal	
Dorchester	2	Borough	England	Dorset	
Dorset	3	County	England	Dorset	
Dover	2	Borough	England	Kent	
Down	2	County	Ireland	Down	
Downpatrick	1	Borough	Ireland	Down	
Drogheda	1	Borough	Ireland	Louth	
Droitwich	1	Borough	England	Worcestershire	
Dublin	2	Borough	Ireland	Dublin	
County Dublin	2	County	Ireland	Dublin	
Dublin University	2	University	Ireland	Dublin	
Dudley	1	Borough	England	Worcestershire	
Dumfries Burghs	1	District	Scotland	Dumfriesshire	
Dumfriesshire	1	County	Scotland	Dumfriesshire	
Dunbartonshire	1	County	Scotland	Dunbartonshire	
Dundalk	1	Borough	Ireland	Louth	
Dundee	1	Borough	Scotland	Forfarshire	
Dungannon	1	Borough	Ireland	Tyrone	
Dungarvan	1	Borough	Ireland	Waterford	
Durham City	2	Borough	England	Durham	
Durham Northern	2	County	England	Durham	
Durham Southern	2	County	England	Durham	
East Retford	2	Borough	England	Nottinghamshire	
Edinburgh	2	Borough	Scotland	Midlothian	
Elgin	1	District	Scotland	Elginshire	
Elginshire and Nairnshire	1	County	Scotland	Elginshire/Nairnshire	
Ennis	1	Borough	Ireland	Clare	
Enniskillen	1	Borough	Ireland	Fermanagh	
Essex Northern	2	County	England	Essex	
Essex Southern	2	County	England	Essex	
Evesham	2	Borough	England	Worcestershire	
Exeter	2	Borough	England	Devon	
Eye	1	Borough	England	Suffolk	
Falkirk Burghs	1	District	Scotland	Stirlingshire	
Fermanagh	2	County	Ireland	Fermanagh	
Fife	1	County	Scotland	Fife	
Finsbury	2	Borough	England	Middlesex	
Flint Boroughs	1	District	Wales	Flintshire	
Flintshire	1	County	Wales	Flintshire	
Forfarshire	1	County	Scotland	Forfarshire	
Frome	1	Borough	England	Somerset	
Galway Borough	2	Borough	Ireland	Galway	
County Galway	2	County	Ireland	Galway	
Gateshead	1	Borough	England	Durham	
Glamorganshire	2	County	Wales	Glamorganshire	
Glasgow	2	Borough	Scotland	Lanarkshire	
Gloucester	2	Borough	England	Gloucestershire	
Gloucestershire Eastern	2	County	England	Gloucestershire	
Gloucestershire Western	2	County	England	Gloucestershire	
Grantham	2	Borough	England	Lincolnshire	
Great Yarmouth	2	Borough	England	Norfolk	
Great Marlow	2	Borough	England	Buckinghamshire	
Greenock	1	Borough	Scotland	Renfrewshire	
Greenwich	2	Borough	England	Kent	
Great Grimsby	1	Borough	England	Lincolnshire	
Guildford	2	Borough	England	Surrey	
Haddington Burghs	1	District	Scotland	Haddingtonshire	
Haddingtonshire	1	County	Scotland	Haddingtonshire	
Halifax	2	Borough	England	West Riding of Yorkshire	
Hampshire Northern	2	County	England	Hampshire	
Hampshire Southern	2	County	England	Hampshire	
Harwich	2	Borough	England	Essex	
Hastings	2	Borough	England	Sussex	
Haverfordwest Boroughs	1	District	Wales	Pembrokeshire	
Helston	1	Borough	England	Cornwall	
Hereford	2	Borough	England	Herefordshire	
Herefordshire	3	County	England	Herefordshire	
Hertford	2	Borough	England	Hertfordshire	
Hertfordshire	3	County	England	Hertfordshire	
Honiton	2	Borough	England	Devon	
Horsham	1	Borough	England	Sussex	
Huddersfield	1	Borough	England	West Riding of Yorkshire	
Huntingdon	2	Borough	England	Huntingdonshire	
Huntingdonshire	2	County	England	Huntingdonshire	
Hythe	1	Borough	England	Kent	
Inverness Burghs	1	District	Scotland	Inverness-shire	
Inverness-shire	1	County	Scotland	Inverness-shire	
Ipswich	2	Borough	England	Suffolk	
Isle of Wight	1	County	England	Hampshire	
Kendal	1	Borough	England	Westmorland	
Kent Eastern	2	County	England	Kent	
Kent Western	2	County	England	Kent	
Kerry	2	County	Ireland	Kerry	
Kidderminster	1	Borough	England	Worcestershire	
Kildare	2	County	Ireland	Kildare	
Kilkenny City	1	Borough	Ireland	Kilkenny	
County Kilkenny	2	County	Ireland	Kilkenny	
Kilmarnock Burghs	1	District	Scotland	Ayrshire	
Kincardineshire	1	County	Scotland	Kincardineshire	
King's County	2	County	Ireland	King's County	
King's Lynn	2	Borough	England	Norfolk	
Kingston upon Hull	2	Borough	England	East Riding of Yorkshire	
Kinsale	1	Borough	Ireland	Cork	
Kirkcaldy District of Burghs	1	Burghs	Scotland	Fife	
Kirkcudbright Stewartry	1	County	Scotland	Kirkcudbright Stewartry	
Knaresborough	2	Borough	England	West Riding of Yorkshire	
Lambeth	2	Borough	England	Surrey	
Lanarkshire	1	County	Scotland	Lanarkshire	
Lancashire Northern	2	County	England	Lancashire	
Lancashire Southern	2	County	England	Lancashire	
Lancaster	2	Borough	England	Lancashire	
Launceston	1	Borough	England	Cornwall	
Leeds	2	Borough	England	West Riding of Yorkshire	
Leicester	2	Borough	England	Leicestershire	
Leicestershire Northern	2	County	England	Leicestershire	
Leicestershire Southern	2	County	England	Leicestershire	
Leith Burghs	1	District	Scotland	Midlothian	
Leitrim	2	County	Ireland	Leitrim	
Leominster	2	Borough	England	Herefordshire	
Lewes	2	Borough	England	Sussex	
Lichfield	2	Borough	England	Staffordshire	
Limerick City	2	Borough	Ireland	Limerick	
County Limerick	2	County	Ireland	Limerick	
Lincoln	2	Borough	England	Lincolnshire	
Lincolnshire Northern	2	County	England	Lincolnshire	
Lincolnshire Southern	2	County	England	Lincolnshire	
Linlithgowshire	1	County	Scotland	Linlithgowshire	
Lisburn	1	Borough	Ireland	Antrim	
Liskeard	1	Borough	England	Cornwall	
Liverpool	2	Borough	England	Lancashire	
The City of London	4	Borough	England	Middlesex	
Londonderry	1	Borough	Ireland	Londonderry	
County Londonderry	2	County	Ireland	Londonderry	
County Longford	2	County	Ireland	Longford	
County Louth	2	County	Ireland	Louth	
Ludlow	2	Borough	England	Shropshire	
Lyme Regis	1	Borough	England	Dorset	
Lymington	2	Borough	England	Hampshire	
Macclesfield	2	Borough	England	Cheshire	
Maidstone	2	Borough	England	Kent	
Maldon	2	Borough	England	Essex	
Mallow	1	Borough	Ireland	Cork	
Malmesbury	1	Borough	England	Wiltshire	
Malton	2	Borough	England	North Riding of Yorkshire/East Riding of Yorkshire	
Manchester	2	Borough	England	Lancashire	
Marlborough	2	Borough	England	Wiltshire	
Marylebone	2	Borough	England	Middlesex	
Mayo	2	County	Ireland	Mayo	
Meath	2	County	Ireland	Meath	
Merionethshire	1	County	Wales	Merionethshire	
Merthyr Tydvil	1	Borough	Wales	Glamorganshire	
Middlesex	2	County	England	Middlesex	
Midhurst	1	Borough	England	Sussex	
Midlothian	1	County	Scotland	Midlothian	
Monaghan	2	County	Ireland	Monaghan	
Monmouth Boroughs	1	District???	Wales	Monmouthshire	
Monmouthshire	2	County	Wales	Monmouthshire	
Montgomery Boroughs	1	District	Wales	Montgomeryshire	
Montgomeryshire	1	County	Wales	Montgomeryshire	
Montrose Burghs	1	District	Scotland	Forfarshire	
Morpeth	1	Borough	England	Northumberland	
Newark-on-Trent	2	Borough	England	Nottinghamshire	
Newcastle-under-Lyme	2	Borough	England	Staffordshire	
Newcastle-upon-Tyne	2	Borough	England	Northumberland	
Newport	2	Borough	England	Hampshire	
New Ross	1	Borough	Ireland	Wexford	
Newry	1	Borough	Ireland	Armagh/Down	
New Shoreham	2	Borough	England	Sussex	
Norfolk Eastern	2	County	England	Norfolk	
Norfolk Western	2	County	England	Norfolk	
Northallerton	1	Borough	England	North Riding of Yorkshire	
Northampton	2	Borough	England	Northamptonshire	
Northamptonshire Northern	2	County	England	Northamptonshire	
Northamptonshire Southern	2	County	England	Northamptonshire	
Northumberland Northern	2	County	England	Northumberland	
Northumberland Southern	2	County	England	Northumberland	
Norwich	2	Borough	England	Norfolk	
Nottingham	2	Borough	England	Nottinghamshire	
Nottinghamshire Northern	2	County	England	Nottinghamshire	
Nottinghamshire Southern	2	County	England	Nottinghamshire	
Oldham	2	Borough	England	Lancashire	
Orkney and Shetland	1	County	Scotland	Orkney & Shetland	
Oxford	2	Borough	England	Oxfordshire	
Oxfordshire	3	County	England	Oxfordshire	
Oxford University	2	University	England	Oxfordshire	
Paisley	1	Borough	Scotland	Renfrewshire	
Peeblesshire	1	County	Scotland	Peeblesshire	
Pembroke Boroughs	1	District	Wales	Pembrokeshire	
Pembrokeshire	1	County	Wales	Pembrokeshire	
Penryn and Falmouth	2	Borough	England	Cornwall	
Perth	1	Borough	Scotland	Perthshire	
Perthshire	1	County	Scotland	Perthshire	
Peterborough	2	Borough	England	Northamptonshire	
Petersfield	1	Borough	England	Hampshire	
Plymouth	2	Borough	England	Devon	
Pontefract	2	Borough	England	West Riding of Yorkshire	
Poole	2	Borough	England	Dorset	
Portarlington	1	Borough	Ireland	Queen's County/King's County	
Portsmouth	2	Borough	England	Hampshire	
Preston	2	Borough	England	Lancashire	
Queen's County	2	County	Ireland	Queen's County	
Radnor Boroughs	1	District	Wales	Radnorshire	
Radnorshire	1	County	Wales	Radnorshire	
Reading	2	Borough	England	Berkshire	
Reigate	1	Borough	England	Surrey	
Renfrewshire	1	County	Scotland	Renfrewshire	
Richmond	2	Borough	England	North Riding of Yorkshire	
Ripon	2	Borough	England	West Riding of Yorkshire	
Rochdale	1	Borough	England	Lancashire	
Rochester	2	Borough	England	Kent	
Roscommon	2	County	Ireland	Roscommon	
Ross and Cromarty	1	County	Scotland	Ross-shire/Cromartyshire	
Roxburghshire	1	County	Scotland	Roxburghshire	
Rutland	2	County	England	Rutland	
Rye	1	Borough	England	Sussex	
St Albans	2	Borough	England	Hertfordshire	Disenfranchised for corruption in 1852
St Andrews Burghs	1	District	Scotland	Fife	
St Ives	1	Borough	England	Cornwall	
Salford	1	Borough	England	Lancashire	
Salisbury	2	Borough	England	Wiltshire	also known as New Sarum
Sandwich	2	Borough	England	Kent	
Scarborough	2	Borough	England	North Riding of Yorkshire	
Selkirkshire	1	County	Scotland	Selkirkshire	
Shaftesbury	1	Borough	England	Dorset	
Sheffield	2	Borough	England	West Riding of Yorkshire	
Shrewsbury	2	Borough	England	Shropshire	
Shropshire Northern	2	County	England	Shropshire	
Shropshire Southern	2	County	England	Shropshire	
Sligo	1	Borough	Ireland	Sligo	
County Sligo	2	County	Ireland	Sligo	
Somerset Eastern	2	County	England	Somerset	
Somerset Western	2	County	England	Somerset	
Southampton	2	Borough	England	Hampshire	
South Shields	1	Borough	England	Durham	
Southwark	2	Borough	England	Surrey	
Stafford	2	Borough	England	Staffordshire	
Staffordshire Northern	2	County	England	Staffordshire	
Staffordshire Southern	2	County	England	Staffordshire	
Stamford	2	Borough	England	Lincolnshire	
Stirling Burghs	1	District	Scotland	Stirlingshire	
Stirlingshire	1	County	Scotland	Stirlingshire	
Stockport	2	Borough	England	Cheshire	
Stoke-upon-Trent	2	Borough	England	Staffordshire	
Stroud	2	Borough	England	Gloucestershire	
Sudbury	2	Borough	England	Suffolk	Disenfranchised for corruption in 1844
Suffolk Eastern	2	County	England	Suffolk	
Suffolk Western	2	County	England	Suffolk	
Sunderland	2	Borough	England	Durham	
Surrey Eastern	2	County	England	Surrey	
Surrey Western	2	County	England	Surrey	
Sussex Eastern	2	County	England	Sussex	
Sussex Western	2	County	England	Sussex	
Sutherland	1	County	Scotland	Sutherland	
Swansea District	1	District	Wales	Glamorganshire	
Tamworth	2	Borough	England	Staffordshire/Warwickshire	
Taunton	2	Borough	England	Somerset	
Tavistock	2	Borough	England	Devon	
Tewkesbury	2	Borough	England	Gloucestershire	
Thetford	2	Borough	England	Norfolk	
Thirsk	1	Borough	England	North Riding of Yorkshire	
Tipperary	2	County	Ireland	Tipperary	
Tiverton	2	Borough	England	Devon	
Totnes	2	Borough	England	Devon	
Tower Hamlets	2	Borough	England	Middlesex	
Tralee	1	Borough	Ireland	Kerry	
Truro	2	Borough	England	Cornwall	
Tynemouth and North Shields	1	Borough	England	Northumberland	
Tyrone	2	County	Ireland	Tyrone	
Wakefield	1	Borough	England	West Riding of Yorkshire	
Wallingford	1	Borough	England	Berkshire	
Walsall	1	Borough	England	Staffordshire	
Wareham	1	Borough	England	Dorset	
Warrington	1	Borough	England	Lancashire	
Warwick	2	Borough	England	Warwickshire	
Warwickshire Northern	2	County	England	Warwickshire	
Warwickshire Southern	2	County	England	Warwickshire	
Waterford City	2	Borough	Ireland	Waterford	
County Waterford	2	County	Ireland	Waterford	
Wells	2	Borough	England	Somerset	
Wenlock	2	Borough	England	Shropshire	
Westbury	1	Borough	England	Wiltshire	
Westmeath	2	County	Ireland	Westmeath	
Westminster	2	Borough	England	Middlesex	
Westmorland	2	County	England	Westmorland	
Wexford	1	Borough	Ireland	Wexford	
County Wexford	2	County	Ireland	Wexford	
Weymouth and Melcombe Regis	2	Borough	England	Dorset	
Whitby	1	Borough	England	North Riding of Yorkshire	
Whitehaven	1	Borough	England	Cumberland	
Wick Burghs	1	District	Scotland	Caithness	
Wicklow	2	County	Ireland	Wicklow	
Wigan	2	Borough	England	Lancashire	
Wigtown Burghs	1	District	Scotland	Wigtownshire	
Wigtownshire	1	County	Scotland	Wigtownshire	
Wilton	1	Borough	England	Wiltshire	
Wiltshire Northern	2	County	England	Wiltshire	
Wiltshire Southern	2	County	England	Wiltshire	
Winchester	2	Borough	England	Hampshire	
Windsor	2	Borough	England	Berkshire	
Wolverhampton	2	Borough	England	Staffordshire	
Woodstock	1	Borough	England	Oxfordshire	
Worcester	2	Borough	England	Worcestershire	
Worcestershire Eastern	2	County	England	Worcestershire	
Worcestershire Western	2	County	England	Worcestershire	
Wycombe	2	Borough	England	Buckinghamshire	
York	2	Borough	England	Yorkshire	
East Riding of Yorkshire	2	County	England	East Riding of Yorkshire	
North Riding of Yorkshire	2	County	England	North Riding of Yorkshire	
West Riding of Yorkshire	2	County	England	West Riding of Yorkshire	divided in 1865: see Northern West Riding of Yorkshire (2 seats) and Southern West Riding of Yorkshire (2 seats)
Youghal	1	Borough	Ireland	Cork	

== See also ==
- List of constituencies enfranchised and disfranchised by the Reform Act 1832

== Sources ==
- Craig, F. W. S. (1989) [1977]. British parliamentary election results 1832–1885 (2nd ed.). Chichester: Parliamentary Research Services. ISBN 0-900178-26-4.
