= List of MPs elected in the 1835 United Kingdom general election =

1835–1837 Parliament of the United Kingdom
←	1832–1835 Parliament	1837–1841 Parliament	→
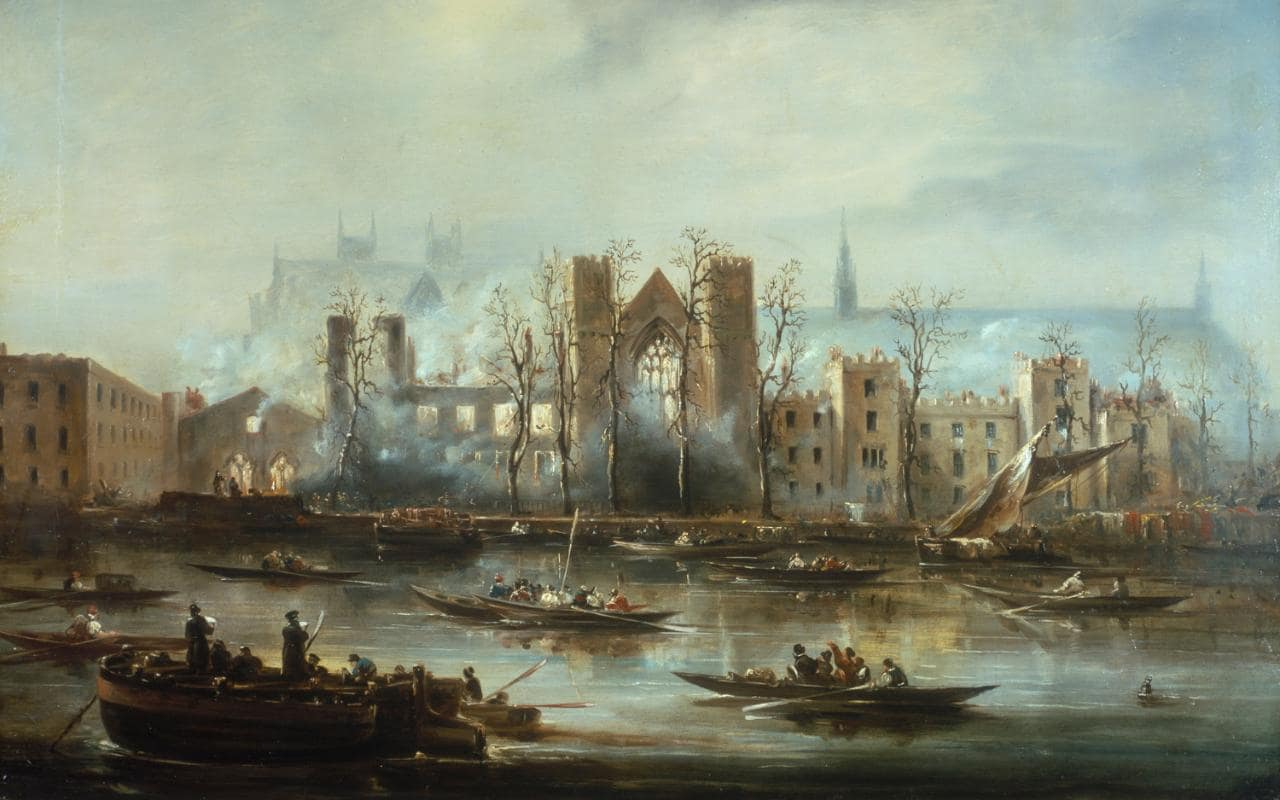
- The Palace of Westminster in 1834

Overview
- Legislative body: Parliament of the United Kingdom
- Jurisdiction: United Kingdom
- Meeting place: Palace of Westminster
- Term: 19 February 1835 – 17 July 1837
- Election: 1835 United Kingdom general election

Crown-in-Parliament William IV

Sessions
- 1st: 19 February 1835 – 10 September 1835
- 2nd: 4 February 1836 – 20 August 1836
- 3rd: 31 January 1837 – 17 July 1837

This is a list of members of Parliament (MPs) elected in the 1835 general election.

== A ==
Constituency	MP	Party
Aberdeen	Alexander Bannerman	Whig
Aberdeenshire	William Gordon	Conservative
Abingdon	Thomas Duffield	Conservative
Andover	Sir John Pollen	Conservative
Andover	Ralph Etwall	Whig
Anglesey	Richard Williams-Bulkeley	Whig
Antrim	Earl of Belfast	Whig
Antrim	John O'Neill	Conservative
Argyll	Walter Frederick Campbell	Whig
Armagh City	Leonard Dobbin	Whig
Armagh	Viscount Acheson	Whig
Armagh	Sir William Verner	Conservative
Arundel	Lord Dudley Stuart	Whig
Ashburton	Charles Lushington	Whig
Ashton-under-Lyne	Charles Hindley	Radical
Athlone	George Buckley-Mathew	Conservative
Aylesbury	Henry Hanmer	Conservative
Aylesbury	William Rickford	Whig
Ayr Burghs	Lord Patrick Crichton-Stuart	Whig
Ayrshire	Richard Alexander Oswald	Whig
== B ==
Constituency	MP	Party
Banbury	Henry William Tancred	Whig
Bandon	Joseph Devonsher Jackson	Conservative
Banffshire	George Ferguson	Conservative
Barnstaple	Sir John Chichester	Whig
Barnstaple	Charles St. John Fancourt	Conservative
Bath	Charles Palmer	Whig
Bath	John Arthur Roebuck	Radical
Beaumaris	Frederick Paget	Whig
Bedford	Samuel Crawley	Whig
Bedford	Frederick Polhill	Conservative
Bedfordshire	John Egerton	Conservative
Bedfordshire	Lord Charles Russell	Whig
Belfast	John McCance	Whig
Belfast	James Emerson Tennent	Conservative
Berkshire	Robert Palmer	Conservative
Berkshire	Philip Pusey	Conservative
Berkshire	John Walter	Whig
Berwickshire	Sir Hugh Purves-Hume-Campbell	Conservative
Berwick-upon-Tweed	James Bradshaw	Conservative
Berwick-upon-Tweed	Rufane Shaw Donkin	Whig
Beverley	Henry Burton-Peters	Whig
Beverley	Sir James Hogg	Conservative
Bewdley	Sir Thomas Winnington	Whig
Birmingham	Thomas Attwood	Radical
Birmingham	Joshua Scholefield	Radical
Blackburn	William Feilden	Whig
Blackburn	William Turner	Whig
Bodmin	Samuel Thomas Spry	Whig
Bodmin	Charles Vivian	Whig
Bolton	Peter Ainsworth	Whig
Bolton	William Bolling	Conservative
Boston	John Studholme Brownrigg	Conservative
Boston	John Wilks	Radical
Bradford	John Hardy	Conservative
Bradford	Ellis Cunliffe Lister	Whig
Brecon	Sir Charles Morgan	Conservative
Breconshire	Thomas Wood	Conservative
Bridgnorth	Sir Robert Pigot	Conservative
Bridgnorth	Thomas Charlton Whitmore	Conservative
Bridgwater	Charles Kemeys-Tynte	Whig
Bridgwater	John Temple Leader	Radical
Bridport	Horace Twiss	Conservative
Bridport	Henry Warburton	Radical
Brighton	George Brooke-Pechell	Whig
Brighton	Isaac Wigney	Radical
Bristol	Philip John Miles	Conservative
Bristol	Sir Richard Vyvyan	Conservative
Buckingham	Thomas Fremantle	Conservative
Buckingham	Sir Harry Verney	Whig
Buckinghamshire	James Backwell Praed	Conservative
Buckinghamshire	Marquess of Chandos	Conservative
Buckinghamshire	Sir William Young	Conservative
Bury	Richard Walker	Whig
Bury St Edmunds	Lord Charles FitzRoy	Whig
Bury St Edmunds	Frederick Hervey	Conservative
Buteshire	Sir William Rae	Conservative
== C ==
Constituency	MP	Party
Caernarfon	Sir Love Jones-Parry	Whig
Caernarvonshire	Thomas Assheton Smith	Conservative
Caithness-shire	Sir George Sinclair	Whig
Calne	Earl of Kerry	Whig
Cambridge	George Pryme	Whig
Cambridge	Thomas Spring Rice	Whig
Cambridge University	Henry Goulburn	Conservative
Cambridge University	Charles Manners-Sutton	Speaker
Cambridgeshire	Richard Jefferson Eaton	Conservative
Cambridgeshire	Richard Greaves Townley	Whig
Cambridgeshire	Eliot Yorke	Conservative
Canterbury	Lord Albert Conyngham	Whig
Canterbury	Frederick Villiers (Note: On petition, the Conservative candidate Stephen Rumbold Lushington was declared elected in place of Villiers.)	Whig
Cardiff Boroughs	John Iltyd Nicholl	Conservative
Cardigan Boroughs	Pryse Pryse	Whig
Cardiganshire	William Edward Powell	Conservative
Carlisle	Philip Howard	Whig
Carlisle	William Marshall	Whig
Carlow	Henry Bruen (Note: On petition, Bruen and Kavanagh were unseated and a by-election was called. A further petition for the by-election restored them to their seats.)	Conservative
Carlow	Thomas Kavanagh	Conservative
Carlow Borough	Francis Bruen	Conservative
Carmarthen Boroughs	David Lewis	Conservative
Carmarthenshire	Sir James Hamlyn-Williams	Whig
Carmarthenshire	George Rice-Trevor	Conservative
Carrickfergus	Peter Kirk	Conservative
Cashel	Louis Perrin	Whig
Cavan	Henry Maxwell	Conservative
Cavan	John Young	Conservative
Chatham	Sir John Beresford	Conservative
Cheltenham	Craven Berkeley	Whig
Cheshire Northern	William Egerton	Conservative
Cheshire Northern	Edward Stanley	Whig
Cheshire Southern	Sir Philip Grey Egerton	Conservative
Cheshire Southern	George Wilbraham	Whig
Chichester	Lord Arthur Lennox	Whig
Chichester	John Abel Smith	Whig
Chippenham	Henry George Boldero	Conservative
Chippenham	Joseph Neeld	Conservative
Christchurch	George Tapps-Gervis	Conservative
Cirencester	Joseph Cripps	Conservative
Cirencester	Lord Robert Somerset	Conservative
City of Chester	Lord Robert Grosvenor	Whig
City of Chester	Sir John Jervis	Radical
City of London	William Crawford	Whig
City of London	George Grote	Radical
City of London	James Pattison	Whig
City of London	Sir Matthew Wood	Whig
Clackmannan and Kinross Shires	Sir Charles Adam	Whig
Clare	William Nugent Macnamara	Irish Repeal (Whig)
Clare	Cornelius O'Brien	Irish Repeal (Whig)
Clitheroe	John Fort	Whig
Clonmel	Dominick Ronayne	Irish Repeal (Whig)
Cockermouth	Henry Aglionby Aglionby	Radical
Cockermouth	Fretchville Dykes	Whig
Colchester	Richard Sanderson	Conservative
Colchester	Sir George Smyth	Conservative
Coleraine	William Taylor Copeland	Whig
Cork City	Sir James Charles Chatterton (Note: On petition, Daniel Callaghan and Herbert Baldwin (Irish Repeal) were declared elected in place of Chatterton and Leycester.)	Conservative
Cork City	Joseph Leycester	Conservative
County Cork	Garrett Standish Barry	Irish Repeal (Whig)
County Cork	Feargus O'Connor (Note: On petition, Richard Longfield (Conservative) was declared elected in place of O'Connor.)	Irish Repeal (Whig)
County Dublin	George Hampden Evans	Whig
County Dublin	Christopher Fitzsimon	Irish Repeal (Whig)
County Galway	John James Bodkin	Whig
County Galway	Thomas Barnwall Martin	Whig
County Kilkenny	Pierce Butler	Irish Repeal (Whig)
County Kilkenny	William Francis Finn	Irish Repeal (Whig)
County Limerick	Richard FitzGibbon	Whig
County Limerick	William Smith O'Brien	Whig
County Louth	Sir Patrick Bellew	Whig
County Louth	Richard Bellew	Irish Repeal (Whig)
County Sligo	Edward Joshua Cooper	Conservative
County Sligo	Alexander Perceval	Conservative
County Waterford	Sir Richard Musgrave	Irish Repeal (Whig)
County Waterford	Patrick Power	Whig
County Wexford	John Maher	Irish Repeal (Whig)
County Wexford	Sir James Power	Irish Repeal (Whig)
Coventry	Edward Ellice	Whig
Coventry	William Williams	Radical
Cricklade	Robert Gordon	Whig
Cricklade	Sir John Neeld	Conservative
== D ==
Constituency	MP	Party
Dartmouth	Sir John Henry Seale	Whig
Denbigh Boroughs	Wilson Jones	Conservative
Denbighshire	William Bagot	Conservative
Denbighshire	Sir Watkin Williams-Wynn	Conservative
Derby	John Ponsonby	Whig
Derby	Edward Strutt	Whig
Devizes	Sir Philip Charles Durham	Conservative
Devizes	Wadham Locke	Whig
Devonport	Sir Edward Codrington	Whig
Devonport	Sir George Grey	Whig
Donegal	Edward Michael Conolly	Conservative
Donegal	Sir Edmund Samuel Hayes	Conservative
Dorchester	Henry Ashley-Cooper	Conservative
Dorchester	Robert Williams	Conservative
Dorset	Lord Ashley	Conservative
Dorset	William Ponsonby	Whig
Dorset	Henry Sturt	Conservative
Dover	John Minet Fector	Conservative
Dover	Sir John Reid	Conservative
Down	Lord Arthur Hill	Conservative
Down	Viscount Castlereagh	Conservative
Downpatrick	David Guardi Ker	Conservative
Drogheda	Andrew O'Dwyer (Note: On petition, O'Dwyer was unseated and a by-election was called.)	Irish Repeal (Whig)
Droitwich	John Barneby	Conservative
Dublin City	Daniel O'Connell (Note: On petition, George Alexander Hamilton and John Beattie West (Conservative) were declared elected in place of O'Connell and Ruthven.)	Irish Repeal (Whig)
Dublin City	Edward Southwell Ruthven	Irish Repeal (Whig)
Dublin University	Thomas Langlois Lefroy	Conservative
Dublin University	Sir Frederick Shaw	Conservative
Dudley	Thomas Hawkes	Conservative
Dumfries District	Matthew Sharpe	Whig
Dumfriesshire	John Hope-Johnstone	Conservative
Dunbartonshire	Alexander Dennistoun	Whig
Dundalk	William Sharman Crawford	Radical
Dundee	Sir Henry Parnell	Whig
Dungannon	John James Knox	Conservative
Dungarvan	Michael O'Loghlen	Whig
Durham	Arthur Hill-Trevor	Conservative
Durham	William Charles Harland	Whig
Durham North	Hedworth Lambton	Whig
Durham North	Sir Hedworth Williamson	Whig
Durham South	Joseph Pease	Whig
Durham South	John Bowes	Whig
== E ==
Constituency	MP	Party
East Cornwall	Sir William Molesworth	Radical
East Cornwall	Sir William Salusbury-Trelawny	Whig
East Cumberland	William Blamire	Whig
East Cumberland	Sir James Graham	Whig
East Gloucestershire	Sir Christopher William Codrington	Conservative
East Gloucestershire	Augustus Moreton	Whig
East Kent	Sir Edward Knatchbull	Conservative
East Kent	John Pemberton Plumptre	Conservative
East Norfolk	Lord Walpole	Conservative
East Norfolk	Edmond Wodehouse	Conservative
East Retford	Arthur Duncombe	Conservative
East Retford	Granville Harcourt-Vernon	Whig
East Riding of Yorkshire	Richard Bethell	Conservative
East Riding of Yorkshire	Paul Thompson	Whig
East Somerset	William Gore-Langton	Whig
East Somerset	Sir William Miles	Conservative
East Suffolk	John Henniker-Major	Conservative
East Suffolk	Sir Charles Broke Vere	Conservative
East Surrey	Richard Alsager	Conservative
East Surrey	Aubrey Beauclerk	Radical
East Sussex	Charles Cavendish	Whig
East Sussex	Herbert Barrett Curteis	Whig
East Worcestershire	Edward Holland	Whig
East Worcestershire	Thomas Cookes	Whig
Edinburgh	James Abercromby	Whig
Edinburgh	John Campbell	Whig
Elgin Burghs	Andrew Leith Hay	Whig
Elginshire and Nairnshire	Francis Ogilvy-Grant	Conservative
Ennis	Hewitt Bridgeman	Radical
Enniskillen	Arthur Henry Cole	Conservative
Evesham	Peter Borthwick	Conservative
Evesham	Sir Charles Cockerell	Whig
Exeter	Edward Divett	Radical
Exeter	Sir William Webb Follett	Conservative
Eye	Sir Edward Kerrison	Conservative
== F ==
Constituency	MP	Party
Falkirk Burghs	William Downe Gillon	Radical
Fermanagh	Mervyn Edward Archdale	Conservative
Fermanagh	Viscount Cole	Conservative
Fife	James Erskine Wemyss	Whig
Finsbury	Thomas Slingsby Duncombe	Radical
Finsbury	Thomas Wakley	Radical
Flint Boroughs	Sir Stephen Glynne	Conservative
Flintshire	Edward Lloyd-Mostyn	Whig
Forfarshire	Lord Douglas Gordon-Hallyburton	Whig
Frome	Thomas Sheppard	Conservative
== G ==
Constituency	MP	Party
Galway Borough	Martin Joseph Blake	Irish Repeal (Whig)
Galway Borough	Andrew Henry Lynch	Irish Repeal (Whig)
Gateshead	Cuthbert Rippon	Radical
Glamorganshire	Lewis Weston Dillwyn	Whig
Glamorganshire	Christopher Rice Mansel Talbot	Whig
Glasgow	Colin Dunlop	Radical
Glasgow	James Oswald	Whig
Gloucester	Maurice Berkeley	Whig
Gloucester	Henry Thomas Hope	Conservative
Grantham	Algernon Tollemache	Conservative
Grantham	Sir Glynne Welby	Conservative
Great Marlow	Sir William Clayton	Whig
Great Marlow	Thomas Peers Williams	Conservative
Great Yarmouth	Thomas Baring	Conservative
Great Yarmouth	Winthrop Mackworth Praed	Conservative
Greenock	Robert Wallace	Whig
Greenwich	John Angerstein	Whig
Greenwich	Edward George Barnard	Radical
Grimsby	Edward Heneage	Whig
Guildford	James Mangles	Whig
Guildford	Charles Baring Wall	Conservative
== H ==
Constituency	MP	Party
Haddington Burghs	Robert Steuart	Whig
Haddingtonshire	Robert Ferguson	Whig
Halifax	James Stuart-Wortley	Conservative
Halifax	Charles Wood	Whig
Harwich	Francis Robert Bonham	Conservative
Harwich	John Charles Herries	Conservative
Hastings	Sir Howard Elphinstone	Radical
Hastings	Frederick North	Whig
Haverfordwest	William Henry Scourfield	Conservative
Helston	Lord James Townshend	Conservative
Hereford	Robert Biddulph	Whig
Hereford	Edward Clive	Whig
Herefordshire	Edward Thomas Foley	Conservative
Herefordshire	Kedgwin Hoskins	Whig
Herefordshire	Sir Robert Price	Whig
Hertford	William Cowper	Whig
Hertford	Viscount Mahon	Conservative
Hertfordshire	Rowland Alston	Whig
Hertfordshire	Viscount Grimston	Conservative
Hertfordshire	Abel Smith	Conservative
Honiton	Hugh Duncan Baillie	Conservative
Honiton	Arthur Chichester	Conservative
Horsham	Robert Henry Hurst	Radical
Huddersfield	John Blackburne	Whig
Huntingdon	Jonathan Peel	Conservative
Huntingdon	Sir Frederick Pollock	Conservative
Huntingdonshire	Viscount Mandeville	Conservative
Huntingdonshire	John Bonfoy Rooper	Whig
Hythe	Stewart Marjoribanks	Whig
== I ==
Constituency	MP	Party
Inverness Burghs	Charles Cumming-Bruce	Conservative
Inverness-shire	Charles Grant	Whig
Ipswich	Robert Dundas (Note: On petition, Dundas and Kelly were unseated and a by-election was called.)	Conservative
Ipswich	Fitzroy Kelly	Conservative
Isle of Wight	Sir Richard Simeon	Whig
== K ==
Constituency	MP	Party
Kendal	John Foster Barham	Whig
Kerry	Frederick Mullins	Irish Repeal (Whig)
Kerry	Morgan O'Connell	Irish Repeal (Whig)
Kidderminster	Sir George Philips	Whig
Kildare	Richard More O'Ferrall	Whig
Kildare	Edward Ruthven	Irish Repeal (Whig)
Kilkenny City	Richard Sullivan	Irish Repeal (Whig)
Kilmarnock Burghs	John Bowring	Radical
Kincardineshire	Hugh Arbuthnot	Conservative
King's County	Nicholas Fitzsimon	Irish Repeal (Whig)
King's County	John Westenra	Whig
King's Lynn	Lord George Bentinck	Conservative
King's Lynn	Stratford Canning	Conservative
Kingston upon Hull	David Carruthers	Conservative
Kingston upon Hull	William Hutt	Radical
Kinsale	Henry Thomas	Conservative
Kirkcaldy Burghs	John Fergus	Whig
Kirkcudbrightshire	Robert Cutlar Fergusson	Whig
Knaresborough	Andrew Lawson	Conservative
Knaresborough	John Richards	Whig
== L ==
Constituency	MP	Party
Lambeth	Charles Tennyson-d'Eyncourt	Whig
Lambeth	Sir Benjamin Hawes	Whig
Lanarkshire	Sir John Maxwell	Whig
Lancaster	Thomas Greene	Conservative
Lancaster	Patrick Maxwell Stewart	Whig
Launceston	Henry Hardinge	Conservative
Leeds	Edward Baines	Whig
Leeds	Sir John Beckett	Conservative
Leicester	Sir Thomas Gladstone	Conservative
Leicester	Edward Goulburn	Conservative
Leith Burghs	John Murray	Whig
Leitrim	Viscount Clements	Whig
Leitrim	Samuel White	Whig
Leominster	Thomas Bish	Whig
Leominster	Beaumont Hotham	Conservative
Lewes	Sir Charles Blunt	Whig
Lewes	Thomas Read Kemp	Whig
Lichfield	Sir George Anson	Whig
Lichfield	Sir Edward Scott	Whig
Limerick City	Sir David Roche	Irish Repeal (Whig)
Limerick City	William Roche	Irish Repeal (Whig)
Lincoln	Edward Bulwer-Lytton	Whig
Lincoln	Charles Sibthorp	Conservative
Linlithgowshire	James Hope	Conservative
Lisburn	Henry Meynell	Conservative
Liskeard	Charles Buller	Radical
Liverpool	William Ewart	Radical
Liverpool	Viscount Sandon	Conservative
Londonderry	Sir Robert Bateson	Conservative
Londonderry	Theobald Jones	Conservative
Londonderry City	Sir Robert Ferguson	Whig
Longford	Viscount Forbes	Conservative
Longford	Anthony Lefroy	Conservative
Ludlow	Viscount Clive	Conservative
Ludlow	Edmund Lechmere Charlton	Conservative
Lyme Regis	William Pinney	Whig
Lymington	William Alexander Mackinnon	Conservative
Lymington	John Stewart	Conservative
== M ==
Constituency	MP	Party
Macclesfield	John Brocklehurst	Whig
Macclesfield	John Ryle	Conservative
Maidstone	Wyndham Lewis	Conservative
Maidstone	Abraham Wildey Robarts	Whig
Maldon	Thomas Barrett-Lennard	Whig
Maldon	Quintin Dick	Conservative
Mallow	Sir Denham Jephson	Whig
Malmesbury	James Howard	Whig
Malton	Charles Pepys	Whig
Malton	John Charles Ramsden	Whig
Manchester	Mark Philips	Whig
Manchester	Charles Poulett Thomson	Whig
Marlborough	Henry Bingham Baring	Conservative
Marlborough	Lord Ernest Bruce	Conservative
Marylebone	Henry Bulwer	Whig
Marylebone	Sir Samuel Whalley	Radical
Mayo	Sir William Brabazon	Irish Repeal (Whig)
Mayo	Dominick Browne	Whig
Meath	Henry Grattan	Irish Repeal (Whig)
Meath	Morgan O'Connell	Irish Repeal (Whig)
Merioneth	Sir Robert Vaughan	Conservative
Merthyr Tydfil	John Josiah Guest	Whig
Middlesex	George Byng	Whig
Middlesex	Joseph Hume	Radical
Midhurst	William Stephen Poyntz	Whig
Midlothian	Sir George Clerk	Conservative
Monaghan	Edward Lucas	Conservative
Monaghan	Henry Westenra	Whig
Monmouth Boroughs	Benjamin Hall	Whig
Monmouthshire	Lord Granville Somerset	Conservative
Monmouthshire	William Addams Williams	Whig
Montgomery Boroughs	Sir John Edwards	Whig
Montgomeryshire	Charles Williams-Wynn	Conservative
Montrose Burghs	Patrick Chalmers	Radical
Morpeth	Edward Howard	Whig
== N ==
Constituency	MP	Party
Newark	William Ewart Gladstone	Conservative
Newark	Thomas Wilde	Whig
Newcastle-under-Lyme	William Henry Miller	Conservative
Newcastle-under-Lyme	Edmund Peel	Conservative
Newcastle-upon-Tyne	William Ord	Whig
Newcastle-upon-Tyne	Sir Matthew White Ridley	Whig
Newport	John Heywood Hawkins	Whig
Newport	William Henry Ord	Whig
New Ross	John Hyacinth Talbot	Irish Repeal (Whig)
Newry	Denis Caulfield Brady	Whig
New Shoreham	Sir Charles Burrell	Conservative
New Shoreham	Sir Harry Goring	Whig
Northallerton	William Battie-Wrightson	Whig
Northampton	Charles Ross	Conservative
Northampton	Robert Vernon Smith	Whig
North Derbyshire	Lord George Cavendish	Whig
North Derbyshire	Thomas Gisborne	Whig
North Devon	Newton Fellowes	Whig
North Devon	Viscount Ebrington	Whig
North Essex	Alexander Baring	Conservative
North Essex	Sir John Tyrell	Conservative
North Hampshire	James Winter Scott	Whig
North Hampshire	Charles Shaw-Lefevre	Whig
North Lancashire	Lord Stanley	Whig
North Lancashire	John Wilson-Patten	Conservative
North Leicestershire	Lord Robert Manners	Conservative
North Leicestershire	Charles March-Phillipps	Radical
North Lincolnshire	Charles Anderson-Pelham	Whig
North Lincolnshire	Thomas Corbett	Conservative
North Northamptonshire	Lord Cardigan	Conservative
North Northamptonshire	William Charles Wentworth-FitzWilliam	Whig
North Northumberland	Lord Ossulston	Conservative
North Northumberland	Viscount Howick	Whig
North Nottinghamshire	Thomas Houldsworth	Conservative
North Nottinghamshire	Viscount Lumley	Whig
North Riding of Yorkshire	Edward Cayley	Whig
North Riding of Yorkshire	William Duncombe	Conservative
North Shropshire	Sir Rowland Hill	Conservative
North Shropshire	William Ormsby-Gore	Conservative
North Staffordshire	Edward Manningham-Buller	Whig
North Staffordshire	Sir Oswald Mosley	Whig
North Warwickshire	William Stratford Dugdale	Conservative
North Warwickshire	Sir John Eardley-Wilmot	Conservative
North Wiltshire	Walter Long	Whig
North Wiltshire	Paul Methuen	Whig
Norwich	William Murray	Conservative
Norwich	Robert Scarlett	Conservative
Nottingham	Sir Ronald Craufurd Ferguson	Whig
Nottingham	Sir John Hobhouse	Radical
== O ==
Constituency	MP	Party
Oldham	William Cobbett	Radical
Oldham	John Fielden	Radical
Orkney and Shetland	Thomas Balfour	Conservative
Oxford	Hughes Hughes	Conservative
Oxford	Donald Maclean	Conservative
Oxfordshire	Lord Norreys	Conservative
Oxfordshire	George Harcourt	Conservative
Oxfordshire	Richard Weyland	Whig
Oxford University	Thomas Grimston Estcourt	Conservative
Oxford University	Sir Robert Inglis	Conservative
== P ==
Constituency	MP	Party
Paisley	Alexander Graham Speirs	Whig
Peeblesshire	Sir John Hay	Conservative
Pembroke	Sir Hugh Owen Owen	Conservative
Pembrokeshire	Sir John Owen	Conservative
Penryn and Falmouth	James William Freshfield	Conservative
Penryn and Falmouth	Robert Rolfe	Whig
Perth	Laurence Oliphant	Whig
Perthshire	Fox Maule	Whig
Peterborough	John Nicholas Fazakerley	Whig
Peterborough	Sir Robert Heron	Whig
Petersfield	Cornthwaite Hector	Radical
Plymouth	Thomas Bewes	Whig
Plymouth	John Collier	Whig
Pontefract	John Gully	Whig
Pontefract	Viscount Pollington	Conservative
Poole	John Byng	Whig
Poole	Charles Augustus Tulk	Whig
Portarlington	George Dawson-Damer	Conservative
Portsmouth	Francis Baring	Whig
Portsmouth	John Bonham-Carter	Whig
Preston	Sir Peter Hesketh-Fleetwood	Conservative
Preston	Henry Smith-Stanley	Whig
== Q ==
Constituency	MP	Party
Queen's County	Sir Charles Coote	Conservative
Queen's County	Thomas Vesey	Conservative
== R ==
Constituency	MP	Party
Radnor	Richard Price	Conservative
Radnorshire	Walter Wilkins	Whig
Reading	Charles Russell	Conservative
Reading	Thomas Talfourd	Radical
Reigate	Viscount Eastnor	Conservative
Renfrewshire	Sir Michael Shaw-Stewart	Whig
Richmond	Thomas Dundas	Whig
Richmond	Alexander Speirs	Whig
Ripon	Sir James Charles Dalbiac	Conservative
Ripon	Thomas Pemberton Leigh	Conservative
Rochdale	John Entwistle	Conservative
Rochester	Ralph Bernal	Whig
Rochester	Thomas Twisden Hodges	Whig
Roscommon	Fitzstephen French	Whig
Roscommon	Denis O'Conor	Irish Repeal (Whig)
Ross and Cromarty Shire	James Alexander Stewart-Mackenzie	Whig
Roxburghshire	Lord John Scott	Conservative
Rutland	Sir Gilbert Heathcote	Whig
Rutland	Sir Gerard Noel	Conservative
Rye	Edward Barrett Curteis	Whig
== S ==
Constituency	MP	Party
St Albans	Edward Grimston	Conservative
St Albans	Sir Henry George Ward	Whig
St Andrews Burghs	Andrew Johnston	Whig
St Ives	James Halse	Conservative
Salford	Joseph Brotherton	Radical
Salisbury	William Bird Brodie	Whig
Salisbury	Wadham Penruddock Wyndham	Conservative
Sandwich	Samuel Grove Price	Conservative
Sandwich	Sir Edward Troubridge	Whig
Scarborough	Sir Frederick Trench	Conservative
Scarborough	Sir John Vanden-Bempde-Johnstone	Whig
Selkirkshire	Alexander Pringle	Conservative
Shaftesbury	John Sayer Poulter	Whig
Sheffield	James Silk Buckingham	Radical
Sheffield	John Parker	Whig
Shrewsbury	John Cressett-Pelham	Conservative
Shrewsbury	Sir John Hanmer	Conservative
Sligo	John Martin	Whig
Southampton	Abel Rous Dottin	Conservative
Southampton	James Barlow Hoy	Conservative
South Derbyshire	Sir George Harpur Crewe	Conservative
South Derbyshire	Sir Roger Gresley	Conservative
South Devon	Lord John Russell	Whig
South Devon	John Yarde-Buller	Conservative
South Essex	Thomas William Bramston	Conservative
South Essex	Robert Westley Hall-Dare	Conservative
South Hampshire	Henry Combe Compton	Conservative
South Hampshire	John Willis Fleming	Conservative
South Lancashire	Richard Bootle-Wilbraham	Conservative
South Lancashire	Francis Egerton	Conservative
South Leicestershire	Sir Henry Halford	Conservative
South Leicestershire	Thomas Frewen Turner	Conservative
South Lincolnshire	Henry Handley	Whig
South Lincolnshire	Gilbert Heathcote	Whig
South Northamptonshire	William Ralph Cartwright	Conservative
South Northamptonshire	Sir Charles Knightley	Conservative
South Northumberland	Thomas Wentworth Beaumont	Whig
South Northumberland	Matthew Bell	Conservative
South Nottinghamshire	Evelyn Denison	Whig
South Nottinghamshire	Earl of Lincoln	Conservative
South Shields	Robert Ingham	Whig
South Shropshire	Robert Clive	Conservative
South Shropshire	Henry Vane	Conservative
South Staffordshire	Edward Littleton	Whig
South Staffordshire	John Wrottesley	Whig
South Warwickshire	Sir John Mordaunt	Conservative
South Warwickshire	Edward Sheldon	Radical
South Wiltshire	Sidney Herbert	Conservative
South Wiltshire	John Benett	Whig
Southwark	Daniel Whittle Harvey	Radical
Southwark	John Humphery	Whig
Stafford	William Fawkener Chetwynd	Whig
Stafford	Sir Francis Holyoake Goodricke	Conservative
Stamford	Thomas Chaplin	Conservative
Stamford	George Finch	Conservative
Stirling Burghs	Archibald Primrose	Whig
Stirlingshire	William Forbes	Conservative
Stockport	Henry Marsland	Radical
Stockport	Thomas Marsland	Conservative
Stoke-upon-Trent	John Davenport	Conservative
Stoke-upon-Trent	Richard Edensor Heathcote	Whig
Stroud	Charles Richard Fox	Whig
Stroud	George Julius Poulett Scrope	Whig
Sudbury	John Bagshaw	Whig
Sudbury	Benjamin Smith	Whig
Sunderland	David Barclay	Whig
Sunderland	William Thompson	Conservative
Sutherland	Roderick Macleod	Whig
Swansea District	John Henry Vivian	Whig
== T ==
Constituency	MP	Party
Tamworth	Sir Robert Peel	Conservative
Tamworth	William Yates Peel	Conservative
Taunton	Edward Thomas Bainbridge	Whig
Taunton	Henry Labouchere	Whig
Tavistock	John Rundle	Whig
Tavistock	William Russell	Whig
Tewkesbury	William Dowdeswell	Conservative
Tewkesbury	Charles Hanbury-Tracy	Whig
Thetford	Francis Baring	Conservative
Thetford	Earl of Euston	Whig
Thirsk	Sir Samuel Crompton	Whig
Tipperary	Robert Otway-Cave	Whig
Tipperary	Richard Lalor Sheil	Irish Repeal (Whig)
Tiverton	John Heathcoat	Whig
Tiverton	James Kennedy	Radical
Totnes	Lord Seymour	Whig
Totnes	Jasper Parrott	Whig
Tower Hamlets	Sir William Clay	Radical
Tower Hamlets	Stephen Lushington	Whig
Tralee	Maurice O'Connell	Irish Repeal (Whig)
Truro	William Tooke	Whig
Truro	John Ennis Vivian	Conservative
Tynemouth and North Shields	George Frederick Young	Whig
Tyrone	Lord Claud Hamilton	Conservative
Tyrone	Henry Lowry-Corry	Conservative
== W ==
Constituency	MP	Party
Wakefield	Daniel Gaskell	Radical
Wallingford	William Seymour Blackstone	Conservative
Walsall	Charles Smith Forster	Conservative
Wareham	John Hales Calcraft	Conservative
Warrington	John Ireland Blackburne	Conservative
Warwick	Edward Bolton King	Whig
Warwick	Charles John Greville	Conservative
Waterford City	Sir Henry Barron	Irish Repeal (Whig)
Waterford City	Sir Thomas Wyse	Whig
Wells	John Lee Lee	Whig
Wells	Nicholas Ridley-Colborne	Whig
Wenlock	James Milnes Gaskell	Conservative
Wenlock	George Weld-Forester	Conservative
Westbury	Sir Ralph Lopes	Whig
West Cornwall	Sir Charles Lemon	Whig
West Cornwall	Edward Wynne-Pendarves	Whig
West Cumberland	Samuel Irton	Conservative
West Cumberland	Edward Stanley	Conservative
West Gloucestershire	Grantley Berkeley	Whig
West Gloucestershire	Marquess of Worcester	Conservative
West Kent	Sir William Geary	Conservative
West Kent	Thomas Law Hodges	Whig
Westmeath	Sir Montagu Chapman	Whig
Westmeath	Sir Richard Nagle	Irish Repeal (Whig)
Westminster	Sir Francis Burdett	Radical
Westminster	Sir George de Lacy Evans	Radical
Westmorland	Henry Lowther	Conservative
Westmorland	Viscount Lowther	Conservative
West Norfolk	Sir Jacob Astley	Whig
West Norfolk	Sir William ffolkes	Whig
West Riding of Yorkshire	Viscount Morpeth	Whig
West Riding of Yorkshire	Sir George Strickland	Whig
West Somerset	Charles Kemeys-Tynte	Whig
West Somerset	Edward Ayshford Sanford	Whig
West Suffolk	Robert Rushbrooke	Conservative
West Suffolk	Henry Wilson	Whig
West Surrey	Charles Barclay	Conservative
West Surrey	William Joseph Denison	Whig
West Sussex	Earl of Surrey	Whig
West Sussex	Lord John Lennox	Whig
West Worcestershire	Henry Lygon	Conservative
West Worcestershire	Henry Winnington	Whig
Wexford	Charles Arthur Walker	Irish Repeal (Whig)
Weymouth and Melcombe Regis	William Burdon	Whig
Weymouth and Melcombe Regis	Sir Fowell Buxton	Whig
Whitby	Aaron Chapman	Conservative
Whitehaven	Matthias Attwood	Conservative
Wick Burghs	James Loch	Whig
Wicklow	James Grattan	Whig
Wicklow	Sir Ralph Howard	Whig
Wigan	John Hodson Kearsley	Conservative
Wigan	Richard Potter	Radical
Wigtown Burghs	Sir John McTaggart	Whig
Wigtownshire	Sir Andrew Agnew	Whig
Wilton	John Penruddocke	Conservative
Winchester	Bingham Baring	Whig
Winchester	Sir James Buller East	Conservative
Windsor	Sir John Edmund de Beauvoir (Note: On petition, Sir John Elley (Conservative) was declared elected in place of de Beauvoir.)	Radical
Windsor	John Ramsbottom	Whig
Wolverhampton	Thomas Thornely	Radical
Wolverhampton	Charles Pelham Villiers	Radical
Woodstock	Lord Charles Spencer-Churchill	Conservative
Worcester	Sir Joseph Bailey	Conservative
Worcester	George Richard Robinson	Whig
Wycombe	Robert Smith	Whig
Wycombe	Charles Grey	Whig
== Y ==
Constituency	MP	Party
York	John Dundas	Whig
York	Sir John Lowther	Conservative
Youghal	John O'Connell	Irish Repeal (Whig)

== See also ==
- List of parliaments of the United Kingdom
- List of United Kingdom Parliament constituencies (1832–1868) by region
