= List of MPs elected in the 1865 United Kingdom general election =

1865–1868 Parliament of the United Kingdom
←	1859–1865 Parliament	1868–1874 Parliament	→
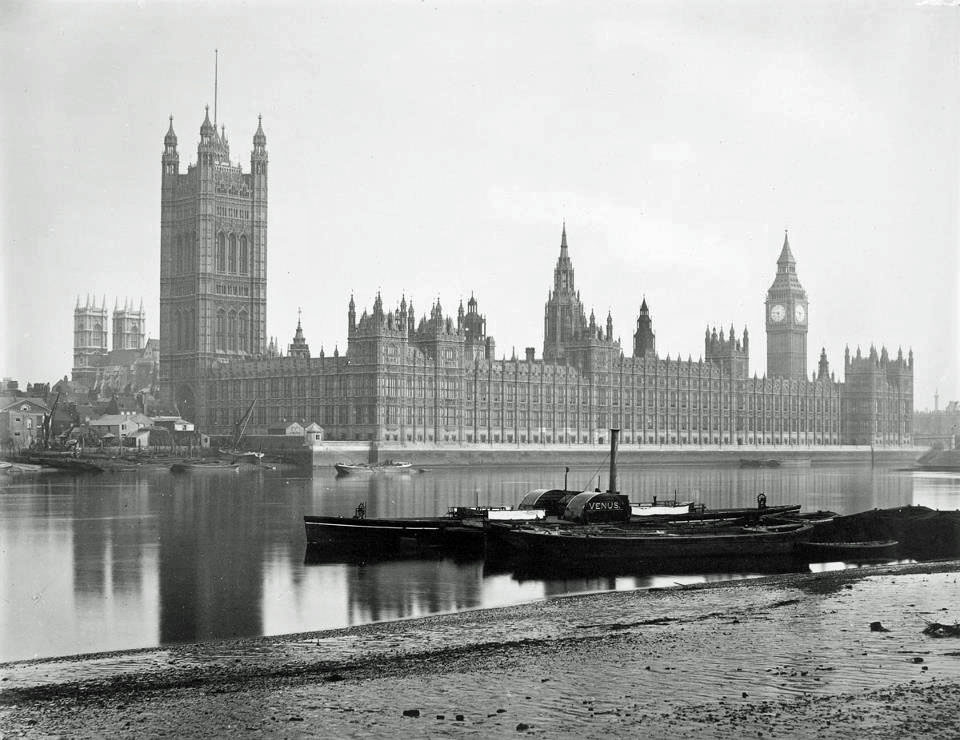
- The Palace of Westminster c.1858–1866

Overview
- Legislative body: Parliament of the United Kingdom
- Jurisdiction: United Kingdom
- Meeting place: Palace of Westminster
- Term: 1 February 1866 – 31 July 1868
- Election: 1865 United Kingdom general election
- Government: Second Palmerston ministry Second Russell ministry Third Derby–Disraeli ministry

House of Commons
- Members: 658
- Speaker: Evelyn Denison
- Leader: Viscount Palmerston (until 18 October 1865); William Ewart Gladstone (18 October 1865–26 June 1866); Benjamin Disraeli (6 July 1866–1 December 1868)
- Prime Minister: Viscount Palmerston (until 18 October 1865); John Russell (29 October 1865–26 June 1866); Edward Smith-Stanley (28 June 1866–25 February 1868); Benjamin Disraeli (from 27 February 1868)
- Leader of the Opposition: William Ewart Gladstone

House of Lords
- Lord Chancellor: The Lord Westbury (until 7 July 1865); The Lord Cranworth (7 July 1865–26 June 1866); The Lord Chelmsford (6 July 1866–29 February 1868); The Lord Cairns (from 29 February 1868)
- Leader: The Earl Granville (until 29 October 1865); John Russell (29 October 1865–26 June 1866); Edward Smith-Stanley (28 June 1866–25 February 1868); The Earl of Malmesbury (from 27 February 1868)
- Leader of the Opposition: John Russell; The Earl Granville

Crown-in-Parliament Victoria

Sessions
- 1st: 1 February 1866 – 10 August 1866
- 2nd: 5 February 1867 – 21 August 1867
- 3rd: 13 February 1868 – 31 July 1868

This is a list of members of Parliament (MPs) elected in the 1865 general election.

Table of contents:

A B C D E F G H I J K L M N O P Q R S T U V W X Y Z By-elections Changes

== A ==
Constituency	MP	Party
Aberdeen	William Henry Sykes	Liberal
Aberdeenshire	William Leslie	Conservative
Abingdon	Hon. Charles Lindsay	Conservative
Andover (Two members)	Hon. Dudley Fortescue	Liberal
Andover (Two members)	William Humphery	Conservative
Anglesey	Richard Williams-Bulkeley	Liberal
Antrim (Two members)	Hon. Edward O'Neill	Conservative
Antrim (Two members)	Henry Seymour	Conservative
== M ==
Constituency	MP	Party
Montrose Burghs	William Edward Baxter	Liberal
== S ==
Constituency	MP	Party
South Lancashire (Three members)	Algernon Egerton	Conservative
South Lancashire (Three members)	William Ewart Gladstone	Liberal
South Lancashire (Three members)	Charles Turner	Conservative
== T ==
Constituency	MP	Party
Tavistock	Arthur Russell	Liberal
Tewkesbury	William Edwin Price	Liberal
Thirsk	William Payne-Gallwey	Conservative
Tiverton	Henry John Temple	Liberal

== See also ==
- UK general election, 1865
- List of parliaments of the United Kingdom
