= 1857 United Kingdom general election =

- 27 March – 24 April 1857

All 654 seats in the House of Commons 328 seats needed for a majority
- Turnout: 716,552
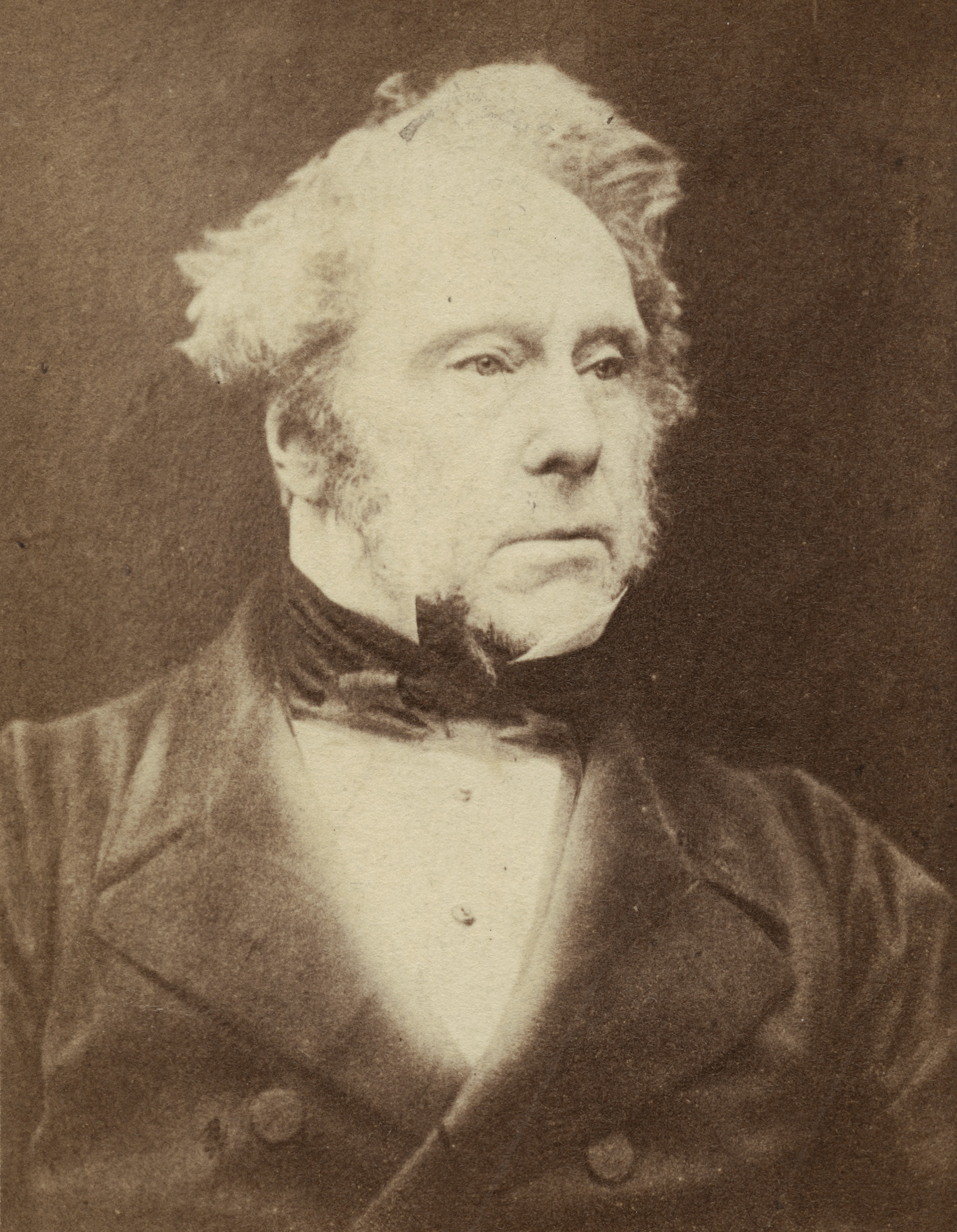

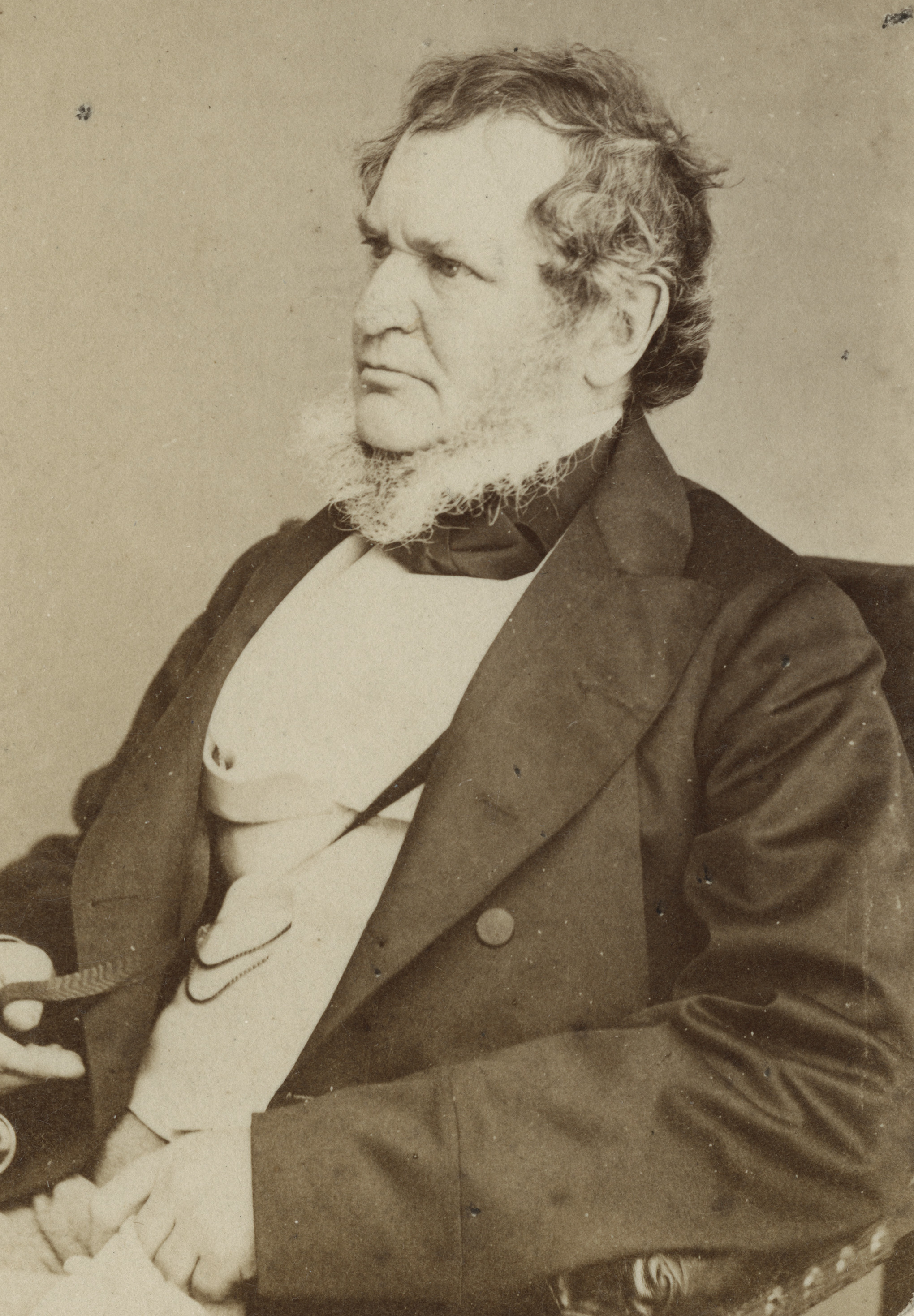
	First party	Second party
Leader	Viscount Palmerston	Earl of Derby
Party	Whig	Conservative
Leader since	6 February 1855	July 1846
Leader's seat	Tiverton	House of Lords
Last election	324 seats, 57.9%	330 seats, 41.9%
Seats won	377 (Note: The seat and vote count figures for the Whigs given here include the Speaker of the House of Commons)	264 (Note: Including Peelites.)
Seat change	▲53	▼66
Popular vote	464,127	239,712
Percentage	64.8% (Note: Several country and university seats held by Conservatives were uncontested, and many urban multi-member constituencies that tended to vote Liberal had multiple candidates, so this is an misleading figure. Therefore, national swing is not applicable to elections in this era.)	33.5%
Swing	▲6.9 pp	▼8.4 pp
- Colours denote the winning party—as shown in § Results

- Composition of the House of Commons after the election
Prime Minister before election
Viscount Palmerston
Whig
Prime Minister after election
Viscount Palmerston
Whig

The 1857 United Kingdom general election was held between 27 March 1857 to 24 April 1857, to elect members of the House of Commons, the lower house of Parliament of the United Kingdom. The Whigs, led by Lord Palmerston, won a majority in the House of Commons as the Conservative vote fell significantly. The election had been provoked by a vote of censure in Palmerston's government over his approach to the Arrow affair which led to the Second Opium War. The election also saw radical liberal John Bright lose his seat for his opposition to the Crimean War.

There is no separate tally of votes or seats for the Peelites. They did not contest elections as an organised party but more as independent Free trade Conservatives with varying degrees of distance from the two main parties.

According to A. J. P. Taylor:

The general election of 1857 is unique in our history: the only election ever conducted as a simple plebiscite in favour of an individual. Even the "coupon" election of 1918 claimed to be more than a plebiscite for Lloyd George; even Disraeli and Gladstone offered a clash of policies as well as of personalities. In 1857 there was no issue before the electorate except whether Palmerston should be Prime Minister; and no one could pretend that Palmerston had any policy except to be himself.

== Results ==

UK General Election 1857
Party	Candidates						Votes		
Party	Stood	Elected	Gained	Unseated	Net	% of total	%	No.	Net %
Whig	507	377			+53	57.65	64.77	464,127	+7.0
Conservative	351	264			−66	40.37	33.45	239,712	−7.1
Independent Irish		13				1.99	1.69	12,099	N/A
Chartist	1	0	0	0	0	0	0.1	614	−0.1

=== Summary ===
Popular vote
Whig	64.77%
Conservative	33.45%
Others	1.69%
Chartist	0.09%

=== Seats summary ===
Parliamentary seats
Whig	57.65%
Conservative	40.37%
Others	1.99%

== See also ==
- List of MPs elected in the 1857 United Kingdom general election
- 1857 United Kingdom general election in Ireland
