= List of MPs elected in the 1832 United Kingdom general election =

1832–1835 Parliament of the United Kingdom
←	1831–1832 Parliament	1835–1837 Parliament	→
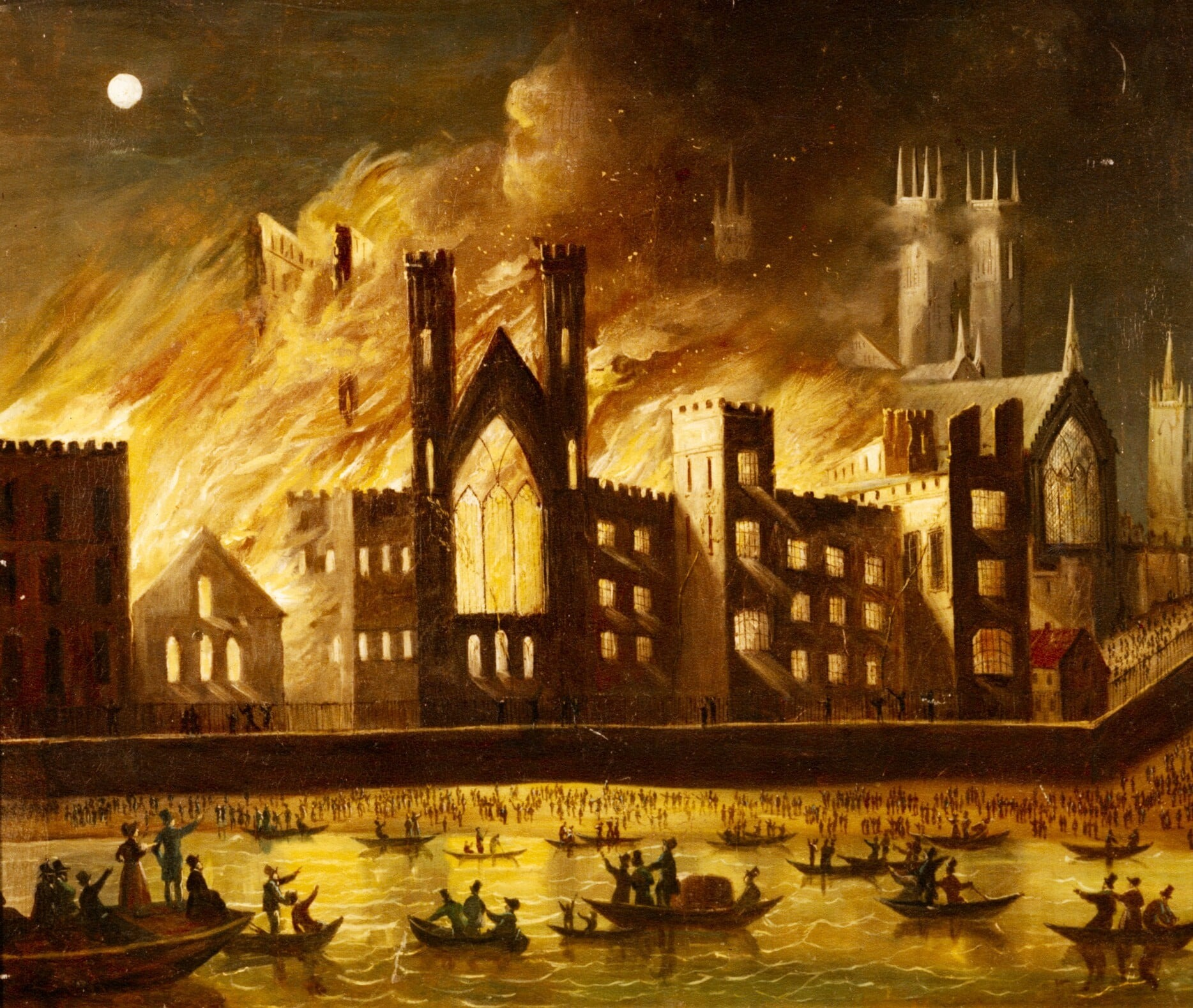
- The Palace of Westminster on fire in 1834

Overview
- Legislative body: Parliament of the United Kingdom
- Jurisdiction: United Kingdom
- Meeting place: Palace of Westminster
- Term: 29 January 1833 – 15 August 1834
- Election: 1832 United Kingdom general election

Crown-in-Parliament William IV

Sessions
- 1st: 29 January 1833 – 29 August 1833
- 2nd: 4 February 1834 – 15 August 1834

This is a list of the 658 Members of Parliament (MPs) elected to the House of Commons of the 11th Parliament of the United Kingdom at the 1832 general election, held over several days from 8 December 1832 to 8 January 1833.

A total of 401 constituencies returned members. 153 constituencies returned one member each; 240 constituencies returned two members each; 7 constituencies returned 3 members each; and one constituency returned 4 members.

== Background ==
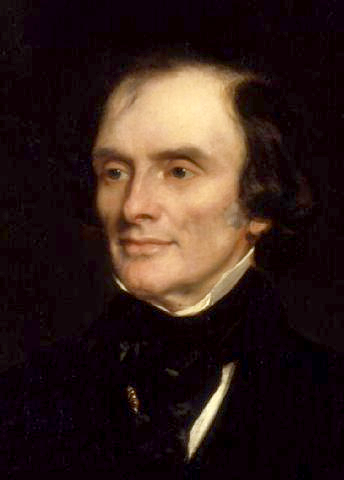
Lord John Russell, architect of the Reform Act 1832 was elected in 1832 as MP for Devonshire Southern

1832 was the first general election in the United Kingdom of Great Britain and Ireland after the Representation of the People Act 1832 (commonly known as the "Reform Act 1832" or the "Great Reform Act") had introduced wide-ranging changes to the electoral system. The Act disenfranchised many small towns (some of which were known as rotten boroughs), reduced the number of MPs elected by some of the remaining boroughs, and created 65 new seats for the counties and 65 new seats for parliamentary boroughs.

The Act also increased the number of individuals entitled to vote, allowing a total of one out of six adult males to vote, but included the first statutory bar to women voting. The franchise was subsequently extended in several steps over the next century, culminating in the Representation of the People (Equal Franchise) Act 1928, which allowed all adult men and women to vote.

Not all constituencies voted. Where the number of candidates did not exceed the number of seats, members were returned unopposed; this was the case for 189 of the 658 members returned.

== Explanatory notes ==
=== Scope ===
The list of MPs records those MPs listed in the London Gazette as having been "returned to serve in the new Parliament". It does not include those subsequently elected in by-elections.

Where the election of an MP was subsequently overturned as a result of an election petition, the relevant entry in the list is shown in italics, and a footnote added to explain the circumstances. For a list of results which were overturned, see below: overturned elections.

=== Parties ===
The party labels for MPs in this period should be treated with caution.

The source for party affiliation of MPs for constituencies in England, Scotland and Wales is F. W. S. Craig's British Parliamentary election results 1832–1885. Craig does not distinguish between Liberals, Radicals and Whigs, labeling them all as "Liberal". Similarly, Craig does not distinguish between those who described themselves as Conservatives and those described as Tory, labeling them all as "Conservative". That convention has been followed in this list, with one variation: the label "Tory" has been used for Conservatives and Tories, because the term "Conservative" was not officially adopted by the party until 1834. Craig's volume covers only two years before that date, and 51 years after it, so "Conservative" is the more appropriate term for the period as a whole; but for 1832, it is an anachronism.

Craig warns that party affiliations in the period were fluid and cannot always be accurately assessed, and that some candidates could have been equally well described as either "Liberal" or "Conservative".

Walker's Parliamentary election results in Ireland, 1801–1922 is the source for the party affiliations of the MPs for constituencies in Ireland. Walker also uses the labels "Liberal" and "Conservative", but warns that they are an "over-simplification", noting that until 1868 neither term was used consistently by contemporaries.

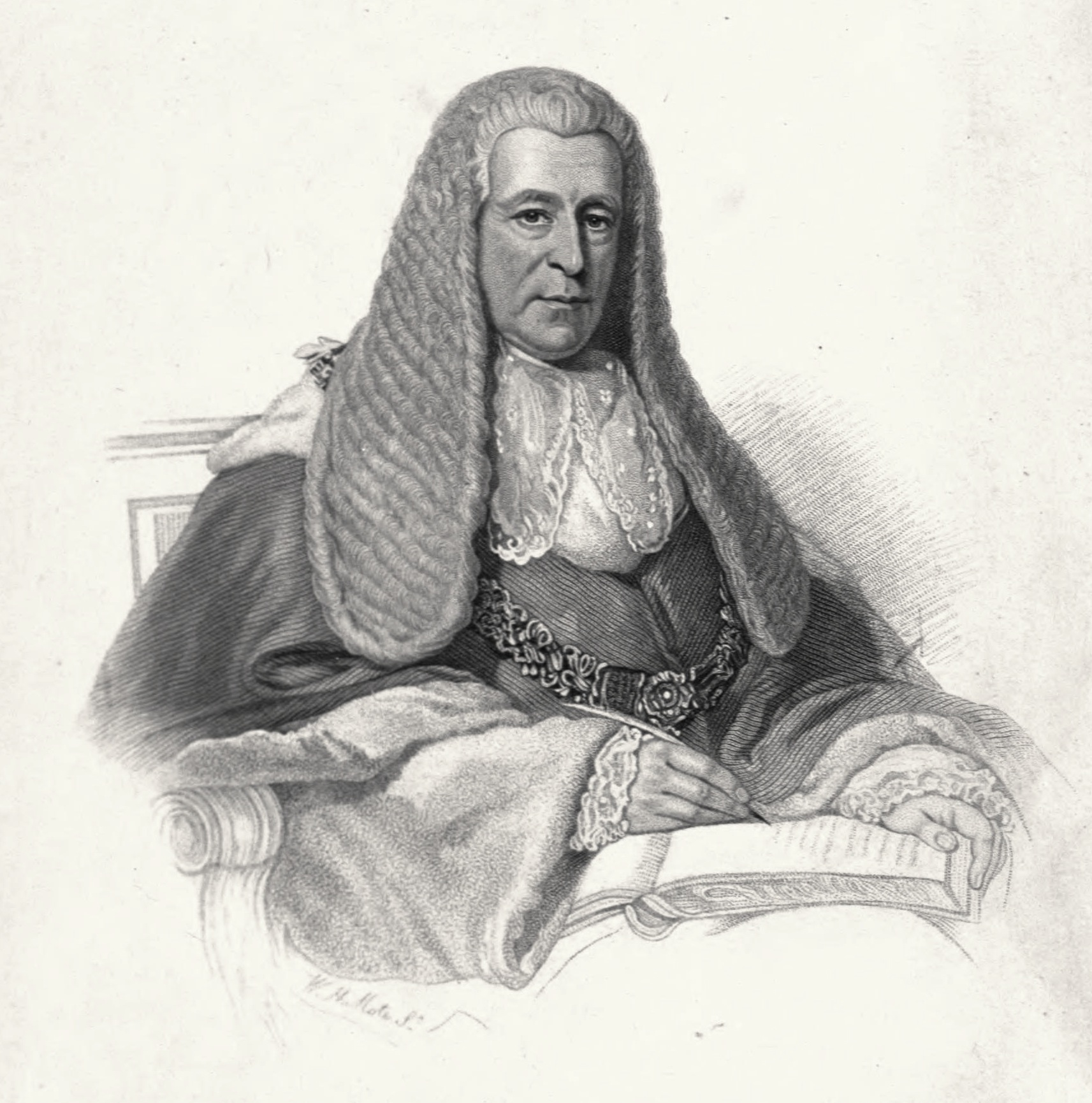
Thomas Langlois Lefroy (Dublin University) was one of six MPs elected for university constituencies

A number of Irish MPs have been labelled as "Repeal", referring to the Repeal Association. Walker assigned this label to MPs who "signed the repeal pledge, advocated it at this election, or supported repeal measures in the ensuing parliament".

=== Types of constituency ===
There were three types of constituency, each with different arrangements for the franchise:

- Counties, which covered the whole of a county. In some cases they were divided into two or more divisions
- University constituencies, which had no geographical basis. Their electorate comprised the graduates of the university
- Parliamentary boroughs, known in Scotland as burghs, which comprised a town and in some cases some areas outside the town boundaries.
  - Districts of burghs (in Scotland) and districts of boroughs (in Wales) were a type of borough constituency in which several boroughs jointly elected one Member of Parliament. The areas were not geographically contiguous, and in some cases the boroughs were in different counties

== List of MPs elected ==
Parties
Liberal Party
Tory
Repeal

Edit by initial letter of constituencies: A–B • C • D–E • F–I • J–L • M–N • O–R • S–T • U–Z

Constituency	Seats	Type	Country	County	Member	Party
Aberdeen	1	Burgh	Scotland	Aberdeenshire	Alexander Bannerman	Liberal
Aberdeenshire	1	County	Scotland	Aberdeenshire	Capt. William Gordon	Tory
Abingdon	1	Borough	England	Berkshire	Thomas Duffield	Tory
Andover	2	Borough	England	Hampshire	Henry Arthur Wallop Fellowes	Liberal
Andover	2	Borough	England	Hampshire	Ralph Etwall	Liberal
Anglesey	1	County	Wales	Anglesey	Sir Richard Williams-Bulkeley, Bt	Liberal
Antrim	2	County	Ireland	Antrim	John O'Neill	Tory
Antrim	2	County	Ireland	Antrim	Earl of Belfast	Liberal
Argyllshire	1	County	Scotland	Argyllshire	James Henry Callander	Liberal
Armagh	1	Borough	Ireland	Armagh	Leonard Dobbin	Liberal
County Armagh	2	County	Ireland	Armagh	Viscount Acheson	Liberal
County Armagh	2	County	Ireland	Armagh	William Verner	Tory
Arundel	1	Borough	England	Sussex	Lord Dudley Stuart	Liberal
Ashburton	1	Borough	England	Devon	William Stephen Poyntz	Liberal
Ashton-under-Lyne	1	Borough	England	Lancashire	George Williams	Liberal
Athlone	1	Borough	Ireland	Westmeath & Roscommon	James Talbot	Liberal
Aylesbury	2	Borough	England	Buckinghamshire	Henry Hanmer	Tory
Aylesbury	2	Borough	England	Buckinghamshire	William Rickford	Liberal
Ayr Burghs	1	District	Scotland	Ayrshire	Thomas Francis Kennedy	Liberal
Ayrshire	1	County	Scotland	Ayrshire	Richard Oswald	Liberal
Banbury	1	Borough	England	Oxfordshire	Henry William Tancred	Liberal
Bandon	1	Borough	Ireland	Cork	William Smyth Bernard	Tory
Banffshire	1	County	Scotland	Banffshire	George Ferguson	Tory
Barnstaple	2	Borough	England	Devon	John Chichester	Liberal
Barnstaple	2	Borough	England	Devon	Charles St John Fancourt	Tory
Bath	2	Borough	England	Somerset	John Arthur Roebuck	Liberal
Bath	2	Borough	England	Somerset	Charles Palmer	Liberal
Beaumaris	1	District	Wales	Anglesey	Frederick Paget	Liberal
Bedford	2	Borough	England	Bedfordshire	Samuel Crawley	Liberal
Bedford	2	Borough	England	Bedfordshire	William Henry Whitbread	Liberal
Bedfordshire	2	County	England	Bedfordshire	Lord Charles Russell	Liberal
Bedfordshire	2	County	England	Bedfordshire	William Stuart	Tory
Belfast	2	Borough	Ireland	Antrim	James Emerson Tennent	Liberal
Belfast	2	Borough	Ireland	Antrim	Lord Arthur Chichester	Liberal
Berkshire	3	County	England	Berkshire	Robert Throckmorton	Liberal
Berkshire	3	County	England	Berkshire	Robert Palmer	Tory
Berkshire	3	County	England	Berkshire	John Walter	Liberal
Berwickshire	1	County	Scotland	Berwickshire	Charles Albany Marjoribanks	Liberal
Berwick-upon-Tweed	2	Borough	England	Northumberland	Sir Rufane Shaw Donkin	Liberal
Berwick-upon-Tweed	2	Borough	England	Northumberland	Sir Francis Blake, Bt	Liberal
Beverley	2	Borough	England	Yorkshire, East	Hon. Charles Langdale	Liberal
Beverley	2	Borough	England	Yorkshire, East	Henry Burton-Peters	Liberal
Bewdley	1	Borough	England	Worcestershire	Sir Thomas Winnington, Bt	Liberal
Birmingham	2	Borough	England	Warwickshire	Thomas Attwood	Liberal
Birmingham	2	Borough	England	Warwickshire	Joshua Scholefield	Liberal
Blackburn	2	Borough	England	Lancashire	William Feilden	Liberal
Blackburn	2	Borough	England	Lancashire	William Turner	Liberal
Bodmin	2	Borough	England	Cornwall	William Peter	Liberal
Bodmin	2	Borough	England	Cornwall	Samuel Thomas Spry	Liberal
Bolton	2	Borough	England	Lancashire	Robert Torrens	Liberal
Bolton	2	Borough	England	Lancashire	William Bolling	Tory
Boston	2	Borough	England	Lincolnshire	John Wilks	Liberal
Boston	2	Borough	England	Lincolnshire	Benjamin Handley	Liberal
Bradford	2	Borough	England	Yorkshire, West	Ellis Cunliffe Lister	Liberal
Bradford	2	Borough	England	Yorkshire, West	John Hardy	Liberal
Brecon	1	Borough	Wales	Breconshire	John Lloyd Vaughan Watkins	Liberal
Breconshire	1	County	Wales	Breconshire	Thomas Wood	Tory
Bridgnorth	2	Borough	England	Shropshire	Robert Pigot	Tory
Bridgnorth	2	Borough	England	Shropshire	Thomas Charlton Whitmore	Tory
Bridgwater	2	Borough	England	Somerset	William Tayleur	Liberal
Bridgwater	2	Borough	England	Somerset	Charles Kemeys Tynte	Liberal
Bridport	2	Borough	England	Dorset	Henry Warburton	Liberal
Bridport	2	Borough	England	Dorset	John Romilly	Liberal
Brighton	2	Borough	England	Sussex	Isaac Newton Wigney	Liberal
Brighton	2	Borough	England	Sussex	George Faithfull	Liberal
Bristol	2	Borough	England	Gloucestershire/Somerset	Sir Richard Vyvyan, Bt	Tory
Bristol	2	Borough	England	Gloucestershire/Somerset	James Evan Baillie	Liberal
Buckingham	2	Borough	England	Buckinghamshire	Sir Harry Verney, Bt	Liberal
Buckingham	2	Borough	England	Buckinghamshire	Sir Thomas Fremantle, Bt	Tory
Buckinghamshire	3	County	England	Buckinghamshire	Marquess of Chandos	Tory
Buckinghamshire	3	County	England	Buckinghamshire	John Smith	Liberal
Buckinghamshire	3	County	England	Buckinghamshire	Sir George Dashwood, Bt	Liberal
Bury	1	Borough	England	Lancashire	Richard Walker	Liberal
Bury St Edmunds	2	Borough	England	Suffolk	Lord Charles FitzRoy	Liberal
Bury St Edmunds	2	Borough	England	Suffolk	Earl Jermyn	Tory
Buteshire	1	County	Scotland	Buteshire	Charles Stuart	Tory
Caernarvon Boroughs	1	District	Wales	Caernarvonshire	Sir Charles Paget	Liberal
Caernarvonshire	1	County	Wales	Caernarvonshire	Thomas Assheton Smith	Tory
Caithness	1	County	Scotland	Buteshire/Caithness	George Sinclair	Liberal
Calne	1	Borough	England	Wiltshire	Earl of Kerry	Liberal
Cambridge	2	Borough	England	Cambridgeshire	George Pryme	Liberal
Cambridge	2	Borough	England	Cambridgeshire	Thomas Spring Rice	Liberal
Cambridge University	2	University	England	Cambridgeshire	Henry Goulburn	Tory
Cambridge University	2	University	England	Cambridgeshire	Charles Manners-Sutton	Tory
Cambridgeshire	3	County	England	Cambridgeshire	Richard Greaves Townley	Liberal
Cambridgeshire	3	County	England	Cambridgeshire	Charles Yorke	Tory
Cambridgeshire	3	County	England	Cambridgeshire	John Walbanke-Childers	Liberal
Canterbury	2	Borough	England	Kent	Richard Watson	Liberal
Canterbury	2	Borough	England	Kent	Viscount Fordwich	Liberal
Cardiff District	1	District	Wales	Glamorganshire	John Iltyd Nicholl	Tory
Cardigan District	1	District	Wales	Cardiganshire	Pryse Pryse	Liberal
Cardiganshire	1	County	Wales	Cardiganshire	William Edward Powell	Tory
Carlisle	2	Borough	England	Cumberland	William James	Liberal
Carlisle	2	Borough	England	Cumberland	Philip Henry Howard	Liberal
Carlow	1	Borough	Ireland	Carlow	Nicholas Aylward Vigors	Repeal
County Carlow	2	County	Ireland	Carlow	Walter Blackney	Repeal
County Carlow	2	County	Ireland	Carlow	Thomas Wallace	Liberal
Carmarthen Boroughs	1	District	Wales	Carmarthenshire	William Yelverton	Liberal
Carmarthenshire	2	County	Wales	Carmarthenshire	Hon. George Rice-Trevor	Tory
Carmarthenshire	2	County	Wales	Carmarthenshire	Edward Hamlyn Adams	Liberal
Carrickfergus	1	Borough	Ireland	Antrim	Conway Richard Dobbs	Tory
Cashel	1	Borough	Ireland	Tipperary	James Roe	Repeal
Cavan	2	County	Ireland	Cavan	Henry Maxwell	Tory
Cavan	2	County	Ireland	Cavan	Sir John Young, Bt	Tory
Chatham	1	Borough	England	Kent	William Leader Maberly	Liberal
Cheltenham	1	Borough	England	Gloucestershire	Hon. Craven Berkeley	Liberal
Cheshire Northern	2	County	England	Cheshire	Hon. Edward Stanley	Liberal
Cheshire Northern	2	County	England	Cheshire	William Egerton	Tory
Cheshire Southern	2	County	England	Cheshire	George Wilbraham	Liberal
Cheshire Southern	2	County	England	Cheshire	Earl Grosvenor	Liberal
Chester	2	Borough	England	Cheshire	John Jervis	Liberal
Chester	2	Borough	England	Cheshire	Lord Robert Grosvenor	Liberal
Chichester	2	Borough	England	Sussex	Lord Arthur Lennox	Liberal
Chichester	2	Borough	England	Sussex	John Abel Smith	Liberal
Chippenham	2	Borough	England	Wiltshire	Joseph Neeld	Tory
Chippenham	2	Borough	England	Wiltshire	William Fox Talbot	Liberal
Christchurch	1	Borough	England	Hampshire	George William Tapps	Tory
Cirencester	2	Borough	England	Gloucestershire	Joseph Cripps	Tory
Cirencester	2	Borough	England	Gloucestershire	Lord Apsley	Tory
Clackmannans and Kinross	1	County	Scotland	Clackmannanshire	Sir Charles Adam	Liberal
Clare	2	County	Ireland	Clare	William Nugent Macnamara	Repeal
Clare	2	County	Ireland	Clare	Cornelius O'Brien	Repeal
Clitheroe	1	Borough	England	Lancashire	John Fort	Liberal
Clonmel	1	Borough	Ireland	Tipperary	Dominick Ronayne	Repeal
Cockermouth	2	Borough	England	Cumberland	Fretchville Dykes	Liberal
Cockermouth	2	Borough	England	Cumberland	Henry Aglionby	Liberal
Colchester	2	Borough	England	Essex	Richard Sanderson	Tory
Colchester	2	Borough	England	Essex	Daniel Whittle Harvey	Liberal
Coleraine	1	Borough	Ireland	Londonderry	Sir John Beresford, Bt	Tory
Cork City	2	Borough	Ireland	Cork	Daniel Callaghan	Liberal
Cork City	2	Borough	Ireland	Cork	Herbert Baldwin	Repeal
County Cork	2	County	Ireland	Cork	Feargus O'Connor	Repeal
County Cork	2	County	Ireland	Cork	Garrett Standish Barry	Repeal
Cornwall Eastern	2	County	England	Cornwall	Sir William Molesworth, Bt	Liberal
Cornwall Eastern	2	County	England	Cornwall	William Salusbury-Trelawny	Liberal
Cornwall Western	2	County	England	Cornwall	Sir Charles Lemon, Bt	Liberal
Cornwall Western	2	County	England	Cornwall	Edward Wynne-Pendarves	Liberal
Coventry	2	Borough	England	Warwickshire	Edward Ellice	Liberal
Coventry	2	Borough	England	Warwickshire	Henry Bulwer	Liberal
Cricklade	2	Borough	England	Wiltshire	Thomas Calley	Liberal
Cricklade	2	Borough	England	Wiltshire	Robert Gordon	Liberal
Cumberland Eastern	2	County	England	Cumberland	William Blamire	Liberal
Cumberland Eastern	2	County	England	Cumberland	Sir James Graham, Bt	Liberal
Cumberland Western	2	County	England	Cumberland	Viscount Lowther	Tory
Cumberland Western	2	County	England	Cumberland	Edward Stanley	Tory
Dartmouth	1	Borough	England	Devon	John Seale	Liberal
Denbigh Boroughs	1	District	Wales	Denbighshire	John Madocks	Liberal
Denbighshire	2	County	Wales	Denbighshire	Sir Watkin Williams-Wynn, Bt	Tory
Denbighshire	2	County	Wales	Denbighshire	Robert Myddleton-Biddulph	Liberal
Derby	2	Borough	England	Derbyshire	Edward Strutt	Liberal
Derby	2	Borough	England	Derbyshire	Henry Cavendish	Liberal
Derbyshire Northern	2	County	England	Derbyshire	Lord Cavendish of Keighley	Liberal
Derbyshire Northern	2	County	England	Derbyshire	Thomas Gisborne	Liberal
Derbyshire Southern	2	County	England	Derbyshire	Hon. George Venables-Vernon	Liberal
Derbyshire Southern	2	County	England	Derbyshire	The Lord Waterpark	Liberal
Devizes	2	Borough	England	Wiltshire	Wadham Locke	Liberal
Devizes	2	Borough	England	Wiltshire	Montague Gore	Liberal
Devonport	2	Borough	England	Devon	Sir Edward Codrington	Liberal
Devonport	2	Borough	England	Devon	Sir George Grey, Bt	Liberal
Devon Northern	2	County	England	Devon	Viscount Ebrington	Liberal
Devon Northern	2	County	England	Devon	Hon. Newton Fellowes	Liberal
Devon Southern	2	County	England	Devon	Lord John Russell	Liberal
Devon Southern	2	County	England	Devon	John Crocker Bulteel	Liberal
Donegal	2	County	Ireland	Donegal	Edmund Hayes	Tory
Donegal	2	County	Ireland	Donegal	Edward Conolly	Tory
Dorchester	2	Borough	England	Dorset	Anthony Henry Ashley-Cooper	Tory
Dorchester	2	Borough	England	Dorset	Robert Williams	Tory
Dorset	3	County	England	Dorset	Lord Ashley	Tory
Dorset	3	County	England	Dorset	William John Bankes	Tory
Dorset	3	County	England	Dorset	Hon. William Ponsonby	Liberal
Dover	2	Borough	England	Kent	Charles Poulett Thomson	Liberal
Dover	2	Borough	England	Kent	Sir John Rae Reid, Bt	Tory
Down	2	County	Ireland	Down	Lord Arthur Hill	Liberal
Down	2	County	Ireland	Down	Viscount Castlereagh	Tory
Downpatrick	1	Borough	Ireland	Down	John Waring Maxwell	Tory
Drogheda	1	Borough	Ireland	Louth	Andrew Carew O'Dwyer	Repeal
Droitwich	1	Borough	England	Worcestershire	John Hodgetts-Foley	Liberal
Dublin	2	Borough	Ireland	Dublin	Daniel O'Connell	Repeal
Dublin	2	Borough	Ireland	Dublin	Edward Southwell Ruthven	Repeal
County Dublin	2	County	Ireland	Dublin	Christopher Fitzsimon	Repeal
County Dublin	2	County	Ireland	Dublin	George Hampden Evans	Liberal
Dublin University	2	University	Ireland	Dublin	Thomas Langlois Lefroy	Tory
Dublin University	2	University	Ireland	Dublin	Sir Frederick Shaw, Bt	Tory
Dudley	1	Borough	England	Worcestershire	Sir John Campbell	Liberal
Dumfries Burghs	1	District	Scotland	Dumfriesshire	Matthew Sharpe	Liberal
Dumfriesshire	1	County	Scotland	Dumfriesshire	John Hope-Johnstone	Tory
Dunbartonshire	1	County	Scotland	Dunbartonshire	John Campbell Colquhoun	Liberal
Dundalk	1	Borough	Ireland	Louth	William O'Reilly	Liberal
Dundee	1	Burgh	Scotland	Forfarshire	George Kinloch	Liberal
Dungannon	1	Borough	Ireland	Tyrone	John James Knox	Tory
Dungarvan	1	Borough	Ireland	Waterford	Hon. George Lamb	Liberal
Durham City	2	Borough	England	Durham	William Chaytor	Liberal
Durham City	2	Borough	England	Durham	William Charles Harland	Liberal
Durham Northern	2	County	England	Durham	Hedworth Lambton	Liberal
Durham Northern	2	County	England	Durham	Sir Hedworth Williamson, Bt	Liberal
Durham Southern	2	County	England	Durham	Joseph Pease	Liberal
Durham Southern	2	County	England	Durham	John Bowes	Liberal
East Retford	2	Borough	England	Nottinghamshire	Granville Harcourt-Vernon	Liberal
East Retford	2	Borough	England	Nottinghamshire	Viscount Newark	Liberal
Edinburgh	2	Burgh	Scotland	Midlothian	Francis Jeffrey	Liberal
Edinburgh	2	Burgh	Scotland	Midlothian	James Abercromby	Liberal
Elgin Burghs	1	District	Scotland	Elginshire	Sir Andrew Leith Hay	Liberal
Elginshire and Nairnshire	1	County	Scotland	Elginshire/Nairnshire	Francis William Grant	Tory
Ennis	1	Borough	Ireland	Clare	Francis Macnamara	Repeal
Enniskillen	1	Borough	Ireland	Fermanagh	Arthur Henry Cole	Tory
Essex Northern	2	County	England	Essex	Sir John Tyssen Tyrell, Bt	Tory
Essex Northern	2	County	England	Essex	Alexander Baring	Tory
Essex Southern	2	County	England	Essex	Robert Westley Hall-Dare	Tory
Essex Southern	2	County	England	Essex	Sir Thomas Barrett-Lennard, Bt	Liberal
Evesham	2	Borough	England	Worcestershire	Sir Charles Cockerell, Bt	Liberal
Evesham	2	Borough	England	Worcestershire	Thomas Hudson	Liberal
Exeter	2	Borough	England	Devon	James Wentworth Buller	Liberal
Exeter	2	Borough	England	Devon	Edward Divett	Liberal
Eye	1	Borough	England	Suffolk	Francis Seymour Stevenson	Tory
Falkirk Burghs	1	District	Scotland	Stirlingshire	William Downe Gillon	Liberal
Fermanagh	2	County	Ireland	Fermanagh	Mervyn Archdall	Tory
Fermanagh	2	County	Ireland	Fermanagh	Viscount Cole	Tory
Fife	1	County	Scotland	Fife	James Erskine Wemyss	Liberal
Finsbury	2	Borough	England	Middlesex	Robert Grant	Liberal
Finsbury	2	Borough	England	Middlesex	Robert Spankie	Tory
Flint Boroughs	1	District	Wales	Flintshire	Sir Stephen Glynne, Bt	Liberal
Flintshire	1	County	Wales	Flintshire	Edward Lloyd-Mostyn	Liberal
Forfarshire	1	County	Scotland	Forfarshire	Douglas Hallyburton	Liberal
Frome	1	Borough	England	Somerset	Thomas Sheppard	Liberal
Galway Borough	2	Borough	Ireland	Galway	Andrew Henry Lynch	Repeal
Galway Borough	2	Borough	Ireland	Galway	Lachlan MacLachlan	Repeal
County Galway	2	County	Ireland	Galway	Thomas Barnwall Martin	Liberal
County Galway	2	County	Ireland	Galway	James Daly	Tory
Gateshead	1	Borough	England	Durham	Cuthbert Rippon	Liberal
Glamorganshire	2	County	Wales	Glamorganshire	Christopher Rice Mansel Talbot	Liberal
Glamorganshire	2	County	Wales	Glamorganshire	Lewis Weston Dillwyn	Liberal
Glasgow	2	Burgh	Scotland	Lanarkshire	James Ewing	Liberal
Glasgow	2	Burgh	Scotland	Lanarkshire	James Oswald	Liberal
Gloucester	2	Borough	England	Gloucestershire	Maurice Berkeley	Liberal
Gloucester	2	Borough	England	Gloucestershire	Edward Webb	Liberal
Gloucestershire Eastern	2	County	England	Gloucestershire	Sir Berkeley Guise, Bt	Liberal
Gloucestershire Eastern	2	County	England	Gloucestershire	Hon. Henry Reynolds-Moreton	Liberal
Gloucestershire Western	2	County	England	Gloucestershire	Grantley Berkeley	Liberal
Gloucestershire Western	2	County	England	Gloucestershire	Hon. Augustus Moreton	Liberal
Grantham	2	Borough	England	Lincolnshire	Algernon Tollemache	Tory
Grantham	2	Borough	England	Lincolnshire	Glynne Earle Welby	Tory
Great Grimsby	1	Borough	England	Lincolnshire	William Maxfield	Liberal
Great Marlow	2	Borough	England	Buckinghamshire	William Clayton	Liberal
Great Marlow	2	Borough	England	Buckinghamshire	Thomas Peers Williams	Tory
Great Yarmouth	2	Borough	England	Norfolk	Charles Edmund Rumbold	Liberal
Great Yarmouth	2	Borough	England	Norfolk	Hon. George Anson	Liberal
Greenock	1	Burgh	Scotland	Renfrewshire	Robert Wallace	Liberal
Greenwich	2	Borough	England	Kent	James Whitley Deans Dundas	Liberal
Greenwich	2	Borough	England	Kent	Edward George Barnard	Liberal
Guildford	2	Borough	England	Surrey	James Mangles	Liberal
Guildford	2	Borough	England	Surrey	Charles Baring Wall	Tory
Haddington Burghs	1	District	Scotland	Haddingtonshire	Robert Steuart	Liberal
Haddingtonshire	1	County	Scotland	Haddingtonshire	James Balfour	Tory
Halifax	2	Borough	England	Yorkshire, West	Rawdon Briggs	Liberal
Halifax	2	Borough	England	Yorkshire, West	Charles Wood	Liberal
Hampshire Northern	2	County	England	Hampshire	Charles Shaw-Lefevre	Liberal
Hampshire Northern	2	County	England	Hampshire	James Winter Scott	Liberal
Hampshire Southern	2	County	England	Hampshire	The Viscount Palmerston	Liberal
Hampshire Southern	2	County	England	Hampshire	Sir George Staunton, Bt	Liberal
Harwich	2	Borough	England	Essex	John Charles Herries	Tory
Harwich	2	Borough	England	Essex	Christopher Thomas Tower	Liberal
Hastings	2	Borough	England	Sussex	Frederick North	Liberal
Hastings	2	Borough	England	Sussex	John Ashley Warre	Liberal
Haverfordwest	1	District	Wales	Pembrokeshire	Sir Richard Bulkeley Philipps, Bt	Liberal
Helston	1	Borough	England	Cornwall	Sackville Walter Lane-Fox	Tory
Hereford	2	Borough	England	Herefordshire	Edward Clive	Liberal
Hereford	2	Borough	England	Herefordshire	Robert Biddulph	Liberal
Herefordshire	3	County	England	Herefordshire	Edward Thomas Foley	Tory
Herefordshire	3	County	England	Herefordshire	Kedgwin Hoskins	Liberal
Herefordshire	3	County	England	Herefordshire	Sir Robert Price, Bt	Liberal
Hertford	2	Borough	England	Hertfordshire	Viscount Ingestrie	Tory
Hertford	2	Borough	England	Hertfordshire	Viscount Mahon	Tory
Hertfordshire	3	County	England	Hertfordshire	Sir John Sebright, Bt	Liberal
Hertfordshire	3	County	England	Hertfordshire	Nicolson Calvert	Liberal
Hertfordshire	3	County	England	Hertfordshire	Viscount Grimston	Tory
Honiton	2	Borough	England	Devon	Viscount Villiers	Tory
Honiton	2	Borough	England	Devon	James Ruddell-Todd	Liberal
Horsham	1	Borough	England	Sussex	Robert Henry Hurst	Liberal
Huddersfield	1	Borough	England	Yorkshire, West	Lewis Fenton	Liberal
Huntingdon	2	Borough	England	Huntingdonshire	Jonathan Peel	Tory
Huntingdon	2	Borough	England	Huntingdonshire	Frederick Pollock	Tory
Huntingdonshire	2	County	England	Huntingdonshire	Viscount Mandeville	Tory
Huntingdonshire	2	County	England	Huntingdonshire	John Bonfoy Rooper	Liberal
Hythe	1	Borough	England	Kent	Stewart Marjoribanks	Liberal
Inverness Burghs	1	District	Scotland	Inverness-shire	John Baillie	Tory
Inverness-shire	1	County	Scotland	Inverness-shire	Charles Grant	Liberal
Ipswich	2	Borough	England	Suffolk	James Morrison	Liberal
Ipswich	2	Borough	England	Suffolk	Rigby Wason	Liberal
Isle of Wight	1	County	England	Hampshire	Sir Richard Simeon, Bt	Liberal
Kendal	1	Borough	England	Westmorland	James Brougham	Liberal
Kent Eastern	2	County	England	Kent	John Pemberton Plumptre	Liberal
Kent Eastern	2	County	England	Kent	Sir Edward Knatchbull, Bt	Tory
Kent Western	2	County	England	Kent	Thomas Law Hodges	Liberal
Kent Western	2	County	England	Kent	Thomas Rider	Liberal
Kerry	2	County	Ireland	Kerry	Frederick William Mullins	Repeal
Kerry	2	County	Ireland	Kerry	Charles O'Connell	Repeal
Kidderminster	1	Borough	England	Worcestershire	Richard Godson	Liberal
Kildare	2	County	Ireland	Kildare	Edward Ruthven	Repeal
Kildare	2	County	Ireland	Kildare	Richard More O'Ferrall	Liberal
Kilkenny City	1	Borough	Ireland	Kilkenny	Richard Sullivan	Repeal
County Kilkenny	2	County	Ireland	Kilkenny	Pierce Butler	Repeal
County Kilkenny	2	County	Ireland	Kilkenny	William Francis Finn	Repeal
Kilmarnock Burghs	1	District	Scotland	Ayrshire	John Dunlop	Liberal
Kincardineshire	1	County	Scotland	Kincardineshire	Hugh Arbuthnot	Tory
King's County	2	County	Ireland	King's County	Lord Oxmantown	Liberal
King's County	2	County	Ireland	King's County	Nicholas Fitzsimon	Repeal
King's Lynn	2	Borough	England	Norfolk	Lord George Bentinck	Tory
King's Lynn	2	Borough	England	Norfolk	Lord William Lennox	Liberal
Kingston upon Hull	2	Borough	England	Yorkshire, East	Matthew Davenport Hill	Liberal
Kingston upon Hull	2	Borough	England	Yorkshire, East	William Hutt	Liberal
Kinsale	1	Borough	Ireland	Cork	Sampson Stawell	Liberal
Kirkcaldy Burghs	1	District	Scotland	Fife	Robert Ferguson	Liberal
Kirkcudbright Stewartry	1	County	Scotland	Kirkcudbright Stewartry	Robert Cutlar Fergusson	Liberal
Knaresborough	2	Borough	England	Yorkshire, West	John Richards	Liberal
Knaresborough	2	Borough	England	Yorkshire, West	Benjamin Rotch	Liberal
Lambeth	2	Borough	England	Surrey	Charles Tennyson	Liberal
Lambeth	2	Borough	England	Surrey	Benjamin Hawes	Liberal
Lanarkshire	1	County	Scotland	Lanarkshire	John Maxwell	Liberal
Lancashire Northern	2	County	England	Lancashire	John Wilson-Patten	Tory
Lancashire Northern	2	County	England	Lancashire	Hon. Edward Stanley	Liberal
Lancashire Southern	2	County	England	Lancashire	George William Wood	Liberal
Lancashire Southern	2	County	England	Lancashire	Viscount Molyneux	Liberal
Lancaster	2	Borough	England	Lancashire	Thomas Greene	Tory
Lancaster	2	Borough	England	Lancashire	Patrick Maxwell Stewart	Liberal
Launceston	1	Borough	England	Cornwall	Henry Hardinge	Tory
Leeds	2	Borough	England	Yorkshire, West	John Marshall	Liberal
Leeds	2	Borough	England	Yorkshire, West	Thomas Babington Macaulay	Liberal
Leicester	2	Borough	England	Leicestershire	William Evans	Liberal
Leicester	2	Borough	England	Leicestershire	Wynne Ellis	Liberal
Leicestershire Northern	2	County	England	Leicestershire	Lord Robert Manners	Tory
Leicestershire Northern	2	County	England	Leicestershire	Charles March Phillipps	Liberal
Leicestershire Southern	2	County	England	Leicestershire	Edward Dawson	Liberal
Leicestershire Southern	2	County	England	Leicestershire	Sir Henry Halford, Bt	Tory
Leith Burghs	1	District	Scotland	Midlothian	John Archibald Murray	Liberal
Leitrim	2	County	Ireland	Leitrim	Samuel White	Liberal
Leitrim	2	County	Ireland	Leitrim	Viscount Clements	Liberal
Leominster	2	Borough	England	Herefordshire	Thomas Bish	Liberal
Leominster	2	Borough	England	Herefordshire	The Lord Hotham	Tory
Lewes	2	Borough	England	Sussex	Sir Charles Richard Blunt, Bt	Liberal
Lewes	2	Borough	England	Sussex	Thomas Read Kemp	Liberal
Lichfield	2	Borough	England	Staffordshire	Sir Edward Scott, Bt	Liberal
Lichfield	2	Borough	England	Staffordshire	Sir George Anson	Liberal
Limerick City	2	Borough	Ireland	Limerick	William Roche	Repeal
Limerick City	2	Borough	Ireland	Limerick	David Vandeleur Roche	Repeal
County Limerick	2	County	Ireland	Limerick	Standish O'Grady	Liberal
County Limerick	2	County	Ireland	Limerick	Hon. Richard FitzGibbon	Liberal
Lincoln	2	Borough	England	Lincolnshire	George Heneage	Liberal
Lincoln	2	Borough	England	Lincolnshire	Edward Lytton Bulwer	Liberal
Lincolnshire Northern	2	County	England	Lincolnshire	Hon. Charles Anderson-Pelham	Liberal
Lincolnshire Northern	2	County	England	Lincolnshire	Sir William Amcotts-Ingilby, Bt	Liberal
Lincolnshire Southern	2	County	England	Lincolnshire	Henry Handley	Liberal
Lincolnshire Southern	2	County	England	Lincolnshire	Gilbert Heathcote	Liberal
Linlithgowshire	1	County	Scotland	Linlithgowshire	Sir Alexander Hope	Tory
Lisburn	1	Borough	Ireland	Antrim	Henry Meynell	Tory
Liskeard	1	Borough	England	Cornwall	Charles Buller	Liberal
Liverpool	2	Borough	England	Lancashire	Viscount Sandon	Tory
Liverpool	2	Borough	England	Lancashire	William Ewart	Liberal
City of London	4	Borough	England	Middlesex	George Grote	Liberal
City of London	4	Borough	England	Middlesex	Sir Matthew Wood, Bt	Liberal
City of London	4	Borough	England	Middlesex	Robert Waithman	Liberal
City of London	4	Borough	England	Middlesex	Sir John Key, Bt	Liberal
Londonderry City	1	Borough	Ireland	Londonderry	Sir Robert Ferguson, Bt	Liberal
County Londonderry	2	County	Ireland	Londonderry	Theobald Jones	Tory
County Londonderry	2	County	Ireland	Londonderry	Sir Robert Bateson, Bt	Tory
County Longford	2	County	Ireland	Longford	Luke White	Repeal
County Longford	2	County	Ireland	Longford	James Halpin Rorke	Repeal
County Louth	2	County	Ireland	Louth	Thomas FitzGerald	Repeal
County Louth	2	County	Ireland	Louth	Richard Bellew	Repeal
Ludlow	2	Borough	England	Shropshire	Viscount Clive	Tory
Ludlow	2	Borough	England	Shropshire	Edward Romilly	Liberal
Lyme Regis	1	Borough	England	Dorset	William Pinney	Liberal
Lymington	2	Borough	England	Hampshire	Sir Harry Burrard-Neale, Bt	Tory
Lymington	2	Borough	England	Hampshire	John Stewart	Tory
Macclesfield	2	Borough	England	Cheshire	John Ryle	Tory
Macclesfield	2	Borough	England	Cheshire	John Brocklehurst	Liberal
Maidstone	2	Borough	England	Kent	Abraham Wildey Robarts	Liberal
Maidstone	2	Borough	England	Kent	Charles James Barnett	Liberal
Maldon	2	Borough	England	Essex	Thomas Barrett Lennard	Liberal
Maldon	2	Borough	England	Essex	Quintin Dick	Tory
Mallow	1	Borough	Ireland	Cork	William Daunt	Repeal
Malmesbury	1	Borough	England	Wiltshire	Viscount Andover	Liberal
Malton	2	Borough	England	Yorkshire, North/East	William Fitzwilliam	Liberal
Malton	2	Borough	England	Yorkshire, North/East	Charles Pepys	Liberal
Manchester	2	Borough	England	Lancashire	Mark Philips	Liberal
Manchester	2	Borough	England	Lancashire	Charles Poulett Thomson	Liberal
Marlborough	2	Borough	England	Wiltshire	Lord Ernest Brudenell-Bruce	Tory
Marlborough	2	Borough	England	Wiltshire	Henry Bingham Baring	Tory
Marylebone	2	Borough	England	Middlesex	Edward Berkeley Portman	Liberal
Marylebone	2	Borough	England	Middlesex	Sir William Horne	Liberal
Mayo	2	County	Ireland	Mayo	John Browne	Liberal
Mayo	2	County	Ireland	Mayo	Dominick Browne	Liberal
Meath	2	County	Ireland	Meath	Morgan O'Connell	Repeal
Meath	2	County	Ireland	Meath	Henry Grattan	Repeal
Merionethshire	1	County	Wales	Merionethshire	Sir Robert Vaughan, Bt.	Tory
Merthyr Tydvil	1	Borough	Wales	Glamorganshire	John Josiah Guest	Liberal
Middlesex	2	County	England	Middlesex	Joseph Hume	Liberal
Middlesex	2	County	England	Middlesex	George Byng	Liberal
Midhurst	1	Borough	England	Sussex	Hon. Frederick Spencer	Liberal
Midlothian (aka Edinburghshire)	1	County	Scotland	Midlothian	Sir John Dalrymple, Bt	Liberal
Monaghan	2	County	Ireland	Monaghan	Cadwallader Blayney	Tory
Monaghan	2	County	Ireland	Monaghan	Hon. Henry Westenra	Liberal
Monmouth Boroughs	1	District	Wales	Monmouthshire	Benjamin Hall	Liberal
Monmouthshire	2	County	Wales	Monmouthshire	Lord Granville Somerset	Tory
Monmouthshire	2	County	Wales	Monmouthshire	William Addams Williams	Liberal
Montgomery Boroughs	1	District	Wales	Montgomeryshire	David Pugh	Tory
Montgomeryshire	1	County	Wales	Montgomeryshire	Charles Williams-Wynn	Tory
Montrose Burghs	1	District	Scotland	Forfarshire	Horatio Ross	Liberal
Morpeth	1	Borough	England	Northumberland	Frederick George Howard	Liberal
Newark-on-Trent	2	Borough	England	Nottinghamshire	William Ewart Gladstone	Tory
Newark-on-Trent	2	Borough	England	Nottinghamshire	William Farnworth Handley	Tory
Newcastle-under-Lyme	2	Borough	England	Staffordshire	William Henry Miller	Tory
Newcastle-under-Lyme	2	Borough	England	Staffordshire	Sir Henry Willoughby, Bt	Tory
Newcastle-upon-Tyne	2	Borough	England	Northumberland	Sir Matthew White Ridley, Bt	Liberal
Newcastle-upon-Tyne	2	Borough	England	Northumberland	John Hodgson	Tory
Newport	2	Borough	England	Hampshire	John Heywood Hawkins	Liberal
Newport	2	Borough	England	Hampshire	William Henry Ord	Liberal
New Ross	1	Borough	Ireland	Wexford	John Hyacinth Talbot	Repeal
Newry	1	Borough	Ireland	Armagh/Down	Lord Marcus Hill	Tory
New Shoreham	2	Borough	England	Sussex	Sir Charles Burrell, Bt	Tory
New Shoreham	2	Borough	England	Sussex	Harry Goring	Liberal
Norfolk Eastern	2	County	England	Norfolk	William Howe Windham	Liberal
Norfolk Eastern	2	County	England	Norfolk	Hon. George Keppel	Liberal
Norfolk Western	2	County	England	Norfolk	Sir Jacob Astley, Bt	Liberal
Norfolk Western	2	County	England	Norfolk	Sir William Ffolkes, Bt	Liberal
Northallerton	1	Borough	England	Yorkshire, North	John George Boss	Liberal
Northampton	2	Borough	England	Northamptonshire	Robert Vernon Smith	Liberal
Northampton	2	Borough	England	Northamptonshire	Charles Ross	Tory
Northamptonshire Northern	2	County	England	Northamptonshire	Viscount Milton	Liberal
Northamptonshire Northern	2	County	England	Northamptonshire	Lord James Brudenell	Tory
Northamptonshire Southern	2	County	England	Northamptonshire	Viscount Althorp	Liberal
Northamptonshire Southern	2	County	England	Northamptonshire	William Ralph Cartwright	Tory
Northumberland Northern	2	County	England	Northumberland	Viscount Howick	Liberal
Northumberland Northern	2	County	England	Northumberland	Lord Ossulston	Tory
Northumberland Southern	2	County	England	Northumberland	Thomas Wentworth Beaumont	Liberal
Northumberland Southern	2	County	England	Northumberland	Matthew Bell	Tory
Norwich	2	Borough	England	Norfolk	Viscount Stormont	Tory
Norwich	2	Borough	England	Norfolk	Sir James Scarlett	Tory
Nottingham	2	Borough	England	Nottinghamshire	Sir Ronald Craufurd Ferguson	Liberal
Nottingham	2	Borough	England	Nottinghamshire	Viscount Duncannon	Liberal
Nottinghamshire Northern	2	County	England	Nottinghamshire	Viscount Lumley	Liberal
Nottinghamshire Northern	2	County	England	Nottinghamshire	Thomas Houldsworth	Tory
Nottinghamshire Southern	2	County	England	Nottinghamshire	Evelyn Denison	Liberal
Nottinghamshire Southern	2	County	England	Nottinghamshire	Earl of Lincoln	Tory
Oldham	2	Borough	England	Lancashire	John Fielden	Liberal
Oldham	2	Borough	England	Lancashire	William Cobbett	Liberal
Orkney and Shetland	1	County	Scotland	Orkney & Shetland	George Traill	Liberal
Oxford	2	Borough	England	Oxfordshire	James Haughton Langston	Liberal
Oxford	2	Borough	England	Oxfordshire	Thomas Stonor	Liberal
Oxfordshire	3	County	England	Oxfordshire	George Granville Harcourt	Liberal
Oxfordshire	3	County	England	Oxfordshire	Lord Norreys	Tory
Oxfordshire	3	County	England	Oxfordshire	Richard Weyland	Liberal
Oxford University	2	University	England	Oxfordshire	Thomas Estcourt·	Tory
Oxford University	2	University	England	Oxfordshire	Sir Robert Inglis, Bt	Tory
Paisley	1	Burgh	Scotland	Renfrewshire	Sir John Maxwell, Bt	Liberal
Peeblesshire	1	County	Scotland	Peeblesshire	Sir John Hay, Bt	Tory
Pembroke Boroughs	1	District	Wales	Pembrokeshire	Hugh Owen Owen	Tory
Pembrokeshire	1	County	Wales	Pembrokeshire	Sir John Owen, Bt	Tory
Penryn and Falmouth	2	Borough	England	Cornwall	Robert Rolfe	Liberal
Penryn and Falmouth	2	Borough	England	Cornwall	Lord Tullamore	Tory
Perth	1	Burgh	Scotland	Perthshire	Laurence Oliphant	Liberal
Perthshire	1	County	Scotland	Perthshire	Earl of Ormelie	Liberal
Peterborough	2	Borough	England	Northamptonshire	John Nicholas Fazakerley	Liberal
Peterborough	2	Borough	England	Northamptonshire	Sir Robert Heron, Bt	Liberal
Petersfield	1	Borough	England	Hampshire	John Shaw-Lefevre	Liberal
Plymouth	2	Borough	England	Devon	Thomas Bewes	Liberal
Plymouth	2	Borough	England	Devon	John Collier	Liberal
Pontefract	2	Borough	England	Yorkshire, West	John Gully	Liberal
Pontefract	2	Borough	England	Yorkshire, West	Hon. Henry Stafford-Jerningham	Liberal
Poole	2	Borough	England	Dorset	Benjamin Lester	Liberal
Poole	2	Borough	England	Dorset	John Byng	Liberal
Portarlington	1	Borough	Ireland	Queen's County/King's County	Thomas Gladstone	Tory
Portsmouth	2	Borough	England	Hampshire	John Bonham-Carter	Liberal
Portsmouth	2	Borough	England	Hampshire	Francis Thornhill Baring	Liberal
Preston	2	Borough	England	Lancashire	Peter Hesketh-Fleetwood	Tory
Preston	2	Borough	England	Lancashire	Hon. Henry Smith-Stanley	Liberal
Queen's County	2	County	Ireland	Queen's County	Patrick Lalor	Repeal
Queen's County	2	County	Ireland	Queen's County	Sir Charles Coote, Bt	Tory
Radnor Boroughs	1	District	Wales	Radnorshire	Richard Price	Tory
Radnorshire	1	County	Wales	Radnorshire	Thomas Frankland Lewis	Tory
Reading	2	Borough	England	Berkshire	Charles Fyshe Palmer	Liberal
Reading	2	Borough	England	Berkshire	Charles Russell	Tory
Reigate	1	Borough	England	Surrey	Viscount Eastnor	Tory
Renfrewshire	1	County	Scotland	Renfrewshire	Sir Michael Shaw-Stewart, Bt	Liberal
Richmond	2	Borough	England	Yorkshire, North	Hon. John Dundas	Liberal
Richmond	2	Borough	England	Yorkshire, North	Sir Robert Lawrence Dundas	Liberal
Ripon	2	Borough	England	Yorkshire, West	Thomas Staveley	Liberal
Ripon	2	Borough	England	Yorkshire, West	Joshua Crompton	Liberal
Rochdale	1	Borough	England	Lancashire	John Fenton	Liberal
Rochester	2	Borough	England	Kent	Ralph Bernal	Liberal
Rochester	2	Borough	England	Kent	John Mills	Tory
Roscommon	2	County	Ireland	Roscommon	Fitzstephen French	Liberal
Roscommon	2	County	Ireland	Roscommon	The O'Conor Don	Repeal
Ross and Cromarty	1	County	Scotland	Ross-shire/Cromartyshire	James Stewart-Mackenzie	Liberal
Roxburghshire	1	County	Scotland	Roxburghshire	George Elliot	Liberal
Rutland	2	County	England	Rutland	Sir Gerard Noel, Bt.	Tory
Rutland	2	County	England	Rutland	Sir Gilbert Heathcote, Bt.	Liberal
Rye	1	Borough	England	Sussex	Edward Barrett Curteis	Liberal
St Albans	2	Borough	England	Hertfordshire	Sir Francis Vincent, Bt	Liberal
St Albans	2	Borough	England	Hertfordshire	Henry George Ward	Liberal
St Andrews Burghs	1	District	Scotland	Fife	Andrew Johnston	Liberal
St Ives	1	Borough	England	Cornwall	James Halse	Tory
Salford	1	Borough	England	Lancashire	Joseph Brotherton	Liberal
Salisbury	2	Borough	England	Wiltshire	William Bird Brodie	Liberal
Salisbury	2	Borough	England	Wiltshire	Wadham Wyndham	Tory
Sandwich	2	Borough	England	Kent	Joseph Marryat	Liberal
Sandwich	2	Borough	England	Kent	Sir Edward Troubridge, Bt	Liberal
Scarborough	2	Borough	England	Yorkshire, East	Sir John Vanden-Bempde-Johnstone, Bt	Liberal
Scarborough	2	Borough	England	Yorkshire, East	Sir George Cayley, Bt	Liberal
Selkirkshire	1	County	Scotland	Selkirkshire	Robert Pringle	Liberal
Shaftesbury	1	Borough	England	Dorset	John Sayer Poulter	Liberal
Sheffield	2	Borough	England	Yorkshire, West	John Parker	Liberal
Sheffield	2	Borough	England	Yorkshire, West	James Silk Buckingham	Liberal
Shrewsbury	2	Borough	England	Shropshire	Sir John Hanmer, Bt	Tory
Shrewsbury	2	Borough	England	Shropshire	Robert Aglionby Slaney	Liberal
Shropshire Northern	2	County	England	Shropshire	Sir Rowland Hill, Bt	Tory
Shropshire Northern	2	County	England	Shropshire	John Cotes	Liberal
Shropshire Southern	2	County	England	Shropshire	Earl of Darlington	Tory
Shropshire Southern	2	County	England	Shropshire	Hon. Robert Clive	Tory
Sligo	1	Borough	Ireland	Sligo	John Martin	Liberal
County Sligo	2	County	Ireland	Sligo	Edward Joshua Cooper	Tory
County Sligo	2	County	Ireland	Sligo	Alexander Perceval	Tory
Somerset Eastern	2	County	England	Somerset	William Gore-Langton	Liberal
Somerset Eastern	2	County	England	Somerset	William Papwell Brigstocke	Liberal
Somerset Western	2	County	England	Somerset	Edward Ayshford Sanford	Liberal
Somerset Western	2	County	England	Somerset	Charles Kemeys-Tynte	Liberal
Southampton	2	Borough	England	Hampshire	Arthur Atherley	Liberal
Southampton	2	Borough	England	Hampshire	James Barlow-Hoy	Tory
South Shields	1	Borough	England	Durham	Robert Ingham	Liberal
Southwark	2	Borough	England	Surrey	John Humphery	Liberal
Southwark	2	Borough	England	Surrey	William Brougham	Liberal
Stafford	2	Borough	England	Staffordshire	William Fawkener Chetwynd	Liberal
Stafford	2	Borough	England	Staffordshire	Rees Howell Gronow	Liberal
Staffordshire Northern	2	County	England	Staffordshire	Sir Oswald Mosley, Bt	Liberal
Staffordshire Northern	2	County	England	Staffordshire	Edward Buller	Liberal
Staffordshire Southern	2	County	England	Staffordshire	Edward John Littleton	Liberal
Staffordshire Southern	2	County	England	Staffordshire	Sir John Wrottesley, Bt	Liberal
Stamford	2	Borough	England	Lincolnshire	Thomas Chaplin	Tory
Stamford	2	Borough	England	Lincolnshire	George Finch	Tory
Stirling Burghs	1	District	Scotland	Stirlingshire	Lord Dalmeny	Liberal
Stirlingshire	1	County	Scotland	Stirlingshire	Charles Elphinstone Fleeming	Liberal
Stockport	2	Borough	England	Cheshire	Thomas Marsland	Tory
Stockport	2	Borough	England	Cheshire	John Horatio Lloyd	Liberal
Stoke-upon-Trent	2	Borough	England	Staffordshire	Josiah Wedgwood III	Liberal
Stoke-upon-Trent	2	Borough	England	Staffordshire	John Davenport	Tory
Stroud	2	Borough	England	Gloucestershire	William Henry Hyett	Liberal
Stroud	2	Borough	England	Gloucestershire	David Ricardo	Liberal
Sudbury	2	Borough	England	Suffolk	Michael Angelo Taylor	Liberal
Sudbury	2	Borough	England	Suffolk	Sir John Benn Walsh, Bt	Tory
Suffolk Eastern	2	County	England	Suffolk	The Lord Henniker	Tory
Suffolk Eastern	2	County	England	Suffolk	Robert Newton Shawe	Liberal
Suffolk Western	2	County	England	Suffolk	Charles Tyrell	Liberal
Suffolk Western	2	County	England	Suffolk	Sir Hyde Parker, Bt	Liberal
Sunderland	2	Borough	England	Durham	Sir William Chaytor, Bt	Liberal
Sunderland	2	Borough	England	Durham	George Barrington	Liberal
Surrey Eastern	2	County	England	Surrey	John Ivatt Briscoe	Liberal
Surrey Eastern	2	County	England	Surrey	Aubrey Beauclerk	Liberal
Surrey Western	2	County	England	Surrey	William Denison	Liberal
Surrey Western	2	County	England	Surrey	John Leach	Liberal
Sussex Eastern	2	County	England	Sussex	Hon. Charles Cavendish	Liberal
Sussex Eastern	2	County	England	Sussex	Herbert Barrett Curteis	Liberal
Sussex Western	2	County	England	Sussex	Lord John Lennox	Liberal
Sussex Western	2	County	England	Sussex	Earl of Surrey	Liberal
Sutherland	1	County	Scotland	Sutherland	Roderick Macleod	Liberal
Swansea District	1	District	Wales	Glamorganshire	John Henry Vivian	Liberal
Tamworth	2	Borough	England	Staffordshire/Warwickshire	Sir Robert Peel	Tory
Tamworth	2	Borough	England	Staffordshire/Warwickshire	Lord Charles Townshend	Liberal
Taunton	2	Borough	England	Somerset	Henry Labouchere	Liberal
Taunton	2	Borough	England	Somerset	Edward Thomas Bainbridge	Liberal
Tavistock	2	Borough	England	Devon	Charles Richard Fox	Liberal
Tavistock	2	Borough	England	Devon	Lord Russell	Liberal
Tewkesbury	2	Borough	England	Gloucestershire	Charles Hanbury-Tracy	Liberal
Tewkesbury	2	Borough	England	Gloucestershire	John Martin	Liberal
Thetford	2	Borough	England	Norfolk	Francis Baring	Tory
Thetford	2	Borough	England	Norfolk	Lord James FitzRoy	Liberal
Thirsk	1	Borough	England	Yorkshire, North	Sir Robert Frankland, Bt	Liberal
Tipperary	2	County	Ireland	Tipperary	Hon. Cornelius O'Callaghan	Liberal
Tipperary	2	County	Ireland	Tipperary	Richard Lalor Sheil	Repeal
Tiverton	2	Borough	England	Devon	John Heathcoat	Liberal
Tiverton	2	Borough	England	Devon	James Kennedy	Liberal
Totnes	2	Borough	England	Devon	Jasper Parrott	Liberal
Totnes	2	Borough	England	Devon	James Cornish	Liberal
Tower Hamlets	2	Borough	England	Middlesex	Stephen Lushington	Liberal
Tower Hamlets	2	Borough	England	Middlesex	William Clay	Liberal
Tralee	1	Borough	Ireland	Kerry	Maurice O'Connell	Repeal
Truro	2	Borough	England	Cornwall	Sir Hussey Vivian, Bt	Liberal
Truro	2	Borough	England	Cornwall	William Tooke	Liberal
Tynemouth and North Shields	1	Borough	England	Northumberland	George Frederick Young	Liberal
Tyrone	2	County	Ireland	Tyrone	Henry Thomas Lowry-Corry	Tory
Tyrone	2	County	Ireland	Tyrone	Sir Hugh Stewart, Bt	Tory
Wakefield	1	Borough	England	Yorkshire, West	Daniel Gaskell	Liberal
Wallingford	1	Borough	England	Berkshire	William Seymour Blackstone	Tory
Walsall	1	Borough	England	Staffordshire	Charles Smith Forster	Tory
Wareham	1	Borough	England	Dorset	John Hales Calcraft	Tory
Warrington	1	Borough	England	Lancashire	Edmund George Hornby	Liberal
Warwick	2	Borough	England	Warwickshire	Sir Charles Greville	Tory
Warwick	2	Borough	England	Warwickshire	Edward Bolton King	Liberal
Warwickshire Northern	2	County	England	Warwickshire	Sir John Eardley-Wilmot, Bt	Tory
Warwickshire Northern	2	County	England	Warwickshire	William Stratford Dugdale	Tory
Warwickshire Southern	2	County	England	Warwickshire	Sir Grey Skipwith, Bt	Liberal
Warwickshire Southern	2	County	England	Warwickshire	Sir George Philips, Bt	Liberal
Waterford City	2	Borough	Ireland	Waterford	Henry Barron	Repeal
Waterford City	2	Borough	Ireland	Waterford	William Christmas	Tory
County Waterford	2	County	Ireland	Waterford	John Matthew Galwey	Repeal
County Waterford	2	County	Ireland	Waterford	Sir Richard Keane, Bt	Liberal
Wells	2	Borough	England	Somerset	Norman Lamont	Liberal
Wells	2	Borough	England	Somerset	John Lee Lee	Liberal
Wenlock	2	Borough	England	Shropshire	George Weld-Forester	Tory
Wenlock	2	Borough	England	Shropshire	James Milnes Gaskell	Tory
Westbury	1	Borough	England	Wiltshire	Sir Ralph Lopes, Bt	Liberal
Westmeath	2	County	Ireland	Westmeath	Montagu Lowther Chapman	Liberal
Westmeath	2	County	Ireland	Westmeath	Sir Richard Nagle, Bt	Repeal
Westminster	2	Borough	England	Middlesex	Sir Francis Burdett, Bt	Liberal
Westminster	2	Borough	England	Middlesex	Sir John Cam Hobhouse, Bt	Liberal
Westmorland	2	County	England	Westmorland	Viscount Lowther	Tory
Westmorland	2	County	England	Westmorland	Henry Cecil Lowther	Tory
Wexford	1	Borough	Ireland	Wexford	Charles Arthur Walker	Repeal
County Wexford	2	County	Ireland	Wexford	Robert Carew	Liberal
County Wexford	2	County	Ireland	Wexford	Henry Lambert	Liberal
Weymouth and Melcombe Regis	2	Borough	England	Dorset	Thomas Fowell Buxton	Liberal
Weymouth and Melcombe Regis	2	Borough	England	Dorset	Sir Frederick Johnstone, Bt	Tory
Whitby	1	Borough	England	Yorkshire, North	Aaron Chapman	Tory
Whitehaven	1	Borough	England	Cumberland	Matthias Attwood	Tory
Wick Burghs	1	District	Scotland	Caithness	James Loch	Liberal
Wicklow	2	County	Ireland	Wicklow	Ralph Howard	Liberal
Wicklow	2	County	Ireland	Wicklow	James Grattan	Liberal
Wigan	2	Borough	England	Lancashire	Ralph Thicknesse	Liberal
Wigan	2	Borough	England	Lancashire	Richard Potter	Liberal
Wigtown Burghs	1	District	Scotland	Wigtownshire	Edward Stewart	Liberal
Wigtownshire	1	County	Scotland	Wigtownshire	Sir Andrew Agnew, Bt	Liberal
Wilton	1	Borough	England	Wiltshire	John Penruddocke	Tory
Wiltshire Northern	2	County	England	Wiltshire	Paul Methuen	Liberal
Wiltshire Northern	2	County	England	Wiltshire	Sir John Astley, Bt	Liberal
Wiltshire Southern	2	County	England	Wiltshire	John Bennett	Liberal
Wiltshire Southern	2	County	England	Wiltshire	Sidney Herbert	Tory
Winchester	2	Borough	England	Hampshire	Bingham Baring	Liberal
Winchester	2	Borough	England	Hampshire	Paulet St John-Mildmay	Liberal
Windsor	2	Borough	England	Berkshire	Samuel Pechell	Liberal
Windsor	2	Borough	England	Berkshire	John Ramsbottom	Liberal
Wolverhampton	2	Borough	England	Staffordshire	William Wolryche-Whitmore	Liberal
Wolverhampton	2	Borough	England	Staffordshire	Richard Fryer	Liberal
Woodstock	1	Borough	England	Oxfordshire	Marquess of Blandford	Tory
Worcester	2	Borough	England	Worcestershire	Thomas Davies	Liberal
Worcester	2	Borough	England	Worcestershire	George Richard Robinson	Liberal
Worcestershire Eastern	2	County	England	Worcestershire	William Congreve Russell	Liberal
Worcestershire Eastern	2	County	England	Worcestershire	Thomas Cookes	Liberal
Worcestershire Western	2	County	England	Worcestershire	Hon. Henry Lygon	Tory
Worcestershire Western	2	County	England	Worcestershire	Hon. Thomas Foley	Liberal
Wycombe	2	Borough	England	Buckinghamshire	Charles Grey	Liberal
Wycombe	2	Borough	England	Buckinghamshire	Hon. Robert Smith	Liberal
York	2	Borough	England	Yorkshire	Edward Petre	Liberal
York	2	Borough	England	Yorkshire	Samuel Adlam Bayntun	Liberal
East Riding of Yorkshire	2	County	England	Yorkshire, East	Richard Bethell	Tory
East Riding of Yorkshire	2	County	England	Yorkshire, East	Paul Thompson	Liberal
North Riding of Yorkshire	2	County	England	Yorkshire, North	Hon. William Duncombe	Tory
North Riding of Yorkshire	2	County	England	Yorkshire, North	Edward Stillingfleet Cayley	Liberal
West Riding of Yorkshire	2	County	England	Yorkshire, West	Viscount Morpeth	Liberal
West Riding of Yorkshire	2	County	England	Yorkshire, West	Sir George Strickland, Bt	Liberal
Youghal	1	Borough	Ireland	Cork	John O'Connell	Repeal

== Overturned elections ==
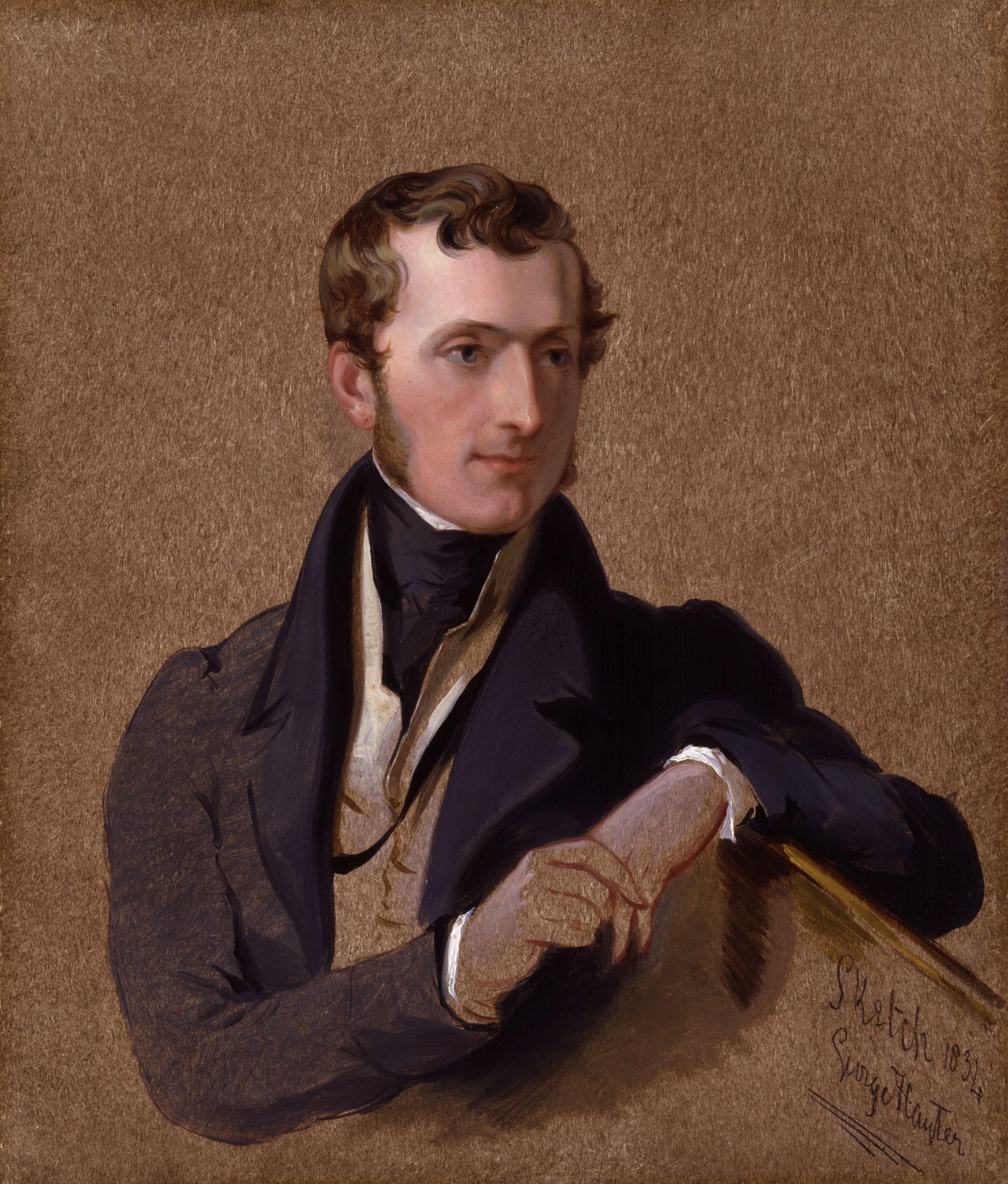
Viscount Mahon, whose election in Hertford was later declared void

The list of MPs records those MPs listed in the London Gazette as having been "returned to serve in the new Parliament". Where the election of an MP was subsequently overturned as a result of an election petition, the relevant entry in the list is shown in italics, and a footnote added to explain the circumstances. A total of 16 MPs in 14 constituencies were unseated, although one (Sir Charles Paget) was subsequently reinstated.

=== Voided elections ===
The 1832 elections were declared void as a result of a petition for a total of 7 MPs in six constituencies:

Constituency	Country	County	Seats voided	Reason for voiding
Carrickfergus	Ireland	Antrim	1 of 1	Bribery and/or corrupt practices. Writ suspended
Hertford	England	Hertfordshire	2 of 2	Bribery and/or corrupt practices. Writ suspended
Montgomery Boroughs	Wales	Montgomeryshire	1 of 1	Bribery and/or corrupt practices. Writ suspended
Oxford	England	Oxfordshire	1 of 2	Bribery and/or corrupt practices. Writ suspended
Tiverton	England	Devon	1 of 2	Candidate lacked property qualification to be elected
Warwick	England	Warwickshire	1 of 2	Bribery and/or corrupt practices. Writ suspended

=== Undue elections ===
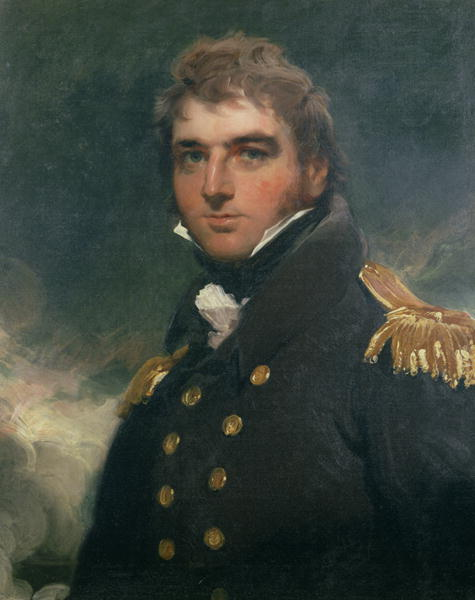
Sir Charles Paget, whose election in Caernarvon Boroughs was overturned. He was reinstated after a further petition

In 8 constituencies, a petition led to a recount and another candidate was declared elected without a further ballot being held. Nine seats changed hands in this way:

Constituency	Country	County	Seats overturned
Caernarvon Boroughs	Wales	Caernarfonshire	1 of 1
Coleraine	Ireland	County Londonderry	1 of 1
Galway Borough	Ireland	County Galway	1 of 2
Longford	Ireland	County Longford	2 of 2
Mallow	Ireland	County Cork	1 of 1
Petersfield	England	Hampshire	1 of 1
Salisbury	England	Wiltshire	1 of 1
Southampton	England	Hampshire	1 of 1

== See also ==
- 1832 United Kingdom general election
- List of parliaments of the United Kingdom
- List of United Kingdom Parliament constituencies (1832–1868)
