= List of MPs elected in the 1832 United Kingdom general election (Constituencies J–L) =

Constituency	Seats	Type	Country	County	Member	Party
Kendal	1	Borough	England	Westmorland	James Brougham	Liberal
Kent Eastern	2	County	England	Kent	John Pemberton Plumptre	Liberal
Kent Eastern	2	County	England	Kent	Sir Edward Knatchbull, Bt	Tory
Kent Western	2	County	England	Kent	Thomas Law Hodges	Liberal
Kent Western	2	County	England	Kent	Thomas Rider	Liberal
Kerry	2	County	Ireland	Kerry	Frederick William Mullins	Irish Repeal
Kerry	2	County	Ireland	Kerry	Charles O'Connell	Irish Repeal
Kidderminster	1	Borough	England	Worcestershire	Richard Godson	Liberal
Kildare	2	County	Ireland	Kildare	Edward Ruthven	Irish Repeal
Kildare	2	County	Ireland	Kildare	Richard More O'Ferrall	Liberal
Kilkenny City	1	Borough	Ireland	Kilkenny	Richard Sullivan	Irish Repeal
County Kilkenny	2	County	Ireland	Kilkenny	Pierce Butler	Irish Repeal
County Kilkenny	2	County	Ireland	Kilkenny	William Francis Finn	Irish Repeal
Kilmarnock Burghs	1	District	Scotland	Ayrshire	John Dunlop	Liberal
Kincardineshire	1	County	Scotland	Kincardineshire	Hugh Arbuthnot	Tory
King's County	2	County	Ireland	King's County	Lord Oxmantown	Liberal
King's County	2	County	Ireland	King's County	Nicholas Fitzsimon	Irish Repeal
King's Lynn	2	Borough	England	Norfolk	Lord George Bentinck	Tory
King's Lynn	2	Borough	England	Norfolk	Lord William Lennox	Liberal
Kingston upon Hull	2	Borough	England	Yorkshire, East	Matthew Davenport Hill	Liberal
Kingston upon Hull	2	Borough	England	Yorkshire, East	William Hutt	Liberal
Kinsale	1	Borough	Ireland	Cork	Sampson Stawell	Liberal
Kirkcaldy Burghs	1	District	Scotland	Fife	Robert Ferguson	Liberal
Kirkcudbright Stewartry	1	County	Scotland	Kirkcudbright Stewartry	Robert Cutlar Fergusson	Liberal
Knaresborough	2	Borough	England	Yorkshire, West	John Richards	Liberal
Knaresborough	2	Borough	England	Yorkshire, West	Benjamin Rotch	Liberal
Lambeth	2	Borough	England	Surrey	Charles Tennyson d'Eyncourt	Liberal
Lambeth	2	Borough	England	Surrey	Benjamin Hawes	Liberal
Lanarkshire	1	County	Scotland	Lanarkshire	John Maxwell	Liberal
Lancashire Northern	2	County	England	Lancashire	John Wilson-Patten	Tory
Lancashire Northern	2	County	England	Lancashire	Hon. Edward Stanley	Liberal
Lancashire Southern	2	County	England	Lancashire	George William Wood	Liberal
Lancashire Southern	2	County	England	Lancashire	Viscount Molyneux	Liberal
Lancaster	2	Borough	England	Lancashire	Thomas Greene	Tory
Lancaster	2	Borough	England	Lancashire	Patrick Maxwell Stewart	Liberal
Launceston	1	Borough	England	Cornwall	Henry Hardinge	Tory
Leeds	2	Borough	England	Yorkshire, West	John Marshall	Liberal
Leeds	2	Borough	England	Yorkshire, West	Thomas Babington Macaulay	Liberal
Leicester	2	Borough	England	Leicestershire	William Evans	Liberal
Leicester	2	Borough	England	Leicestershire	Wynne Ellis	Liberal
Leicestershire Northern	2	County	England	Leicestershire	Lord Robert Manners	Tory
Leicestershire Northern	2	County	England	Leicestershire	Charles March Phillipps	Liberal
Leicestershire Southern	2	County	England	Leicestershire	Edward Dawson	Liberal
Leicestershire Southern	2	County	England	Leicestershire	Sir Henry Halford, Bt	Tory
Leith Burghs	1	District	Scotland	Midlothian	John Archibald Murray	Liberal
Leitrim	2	County	Ireland	Leitrim	Samuel White	Liberal
Leitrim	2	County	Ireland	Leitrim	Viscount Clements	Liberal
Leominster	2	Borough	England	Herefordshire	Thomas Bish	Liberal
Leominster	2	Borough	England	Herefordshire	The Lord Hotham	Tory
Lewes	2	Borough	England	Sussex	Sir Charles Richard Blunt, Bt	Liberal
Lewes	2	Borough	England	Sussex	Thomas Read Kemp	Liberal
Lichfield	2	Borough	England	Staffordshire	Sir Edward Scott, Bt	Liberal
Lichfield	2	Borough	England	Staffordshire	Sir George Anson	Liberal
Limerick City	2	Borough	Ireland	Limerick	William Roche	Irish Repeal
Limerick City	2	Borough	Ireland	Limerick	David Vandeleur Roche	Irish Repeal
County Limerick	2	County	Ireland	Limerick	Standish O'Grady	Liberal
County Limerick	2	County	Ireland	Limerick	Hon. Richard FitzGibbon	Liberal
Lincoln	2	Borough	England	Lincolnshire	George Heneage	Liberal
Lincoln	2	Borough	England	Lincolnshire	Edward Lytton Bulwer	Liberal
Lincolnshire Northern	2	County	England	Lincolnshire	Hon. Charles Anderson-Pelham	Liberal
Lincolnshire Northern	2	County	England	Lincolnshire	Sir William Amcotts-Ingilby, Bt	Liberal
Lincolnshire Southern	2	County	England	Lincolnshire	Henry Handley	Liberal
Lincolnshire Southern	2	County	England	Lincolnshire	Gilbert Heathcote	Liberal
Linlithgowshire	1	County	Scotland	Linlithgowshire	Sir Alexander Hope	Tory
Lisburn	1	Borough	Ireland	Antrim	Henry Meynell	Tory
Liskeard	1	Borough	England	Cornwall	Charles Buller	Liberal
Liverpool	2	Borough	England	Lancashire	Viscount Sandon	Tory
Liverpool	2	Borough	England	Lancashire	William Ewart	Liberal
City of London	4	Borough	England	Middlesex	George Grote	Liberal
City of London	4	Borough	England	Middlesex	Sir Matthew Wood, Bt	Liberal
City of London	4	Borough	England	Middlesex	Robert Waithman	Liberal
City of London	4	Borough	England	Middlesex	Sir John Key, Bt	Liberal
Londonderry City	1	Borough	Ireland	Londonderry	Sir Robert Ferguson, Bt	Liberal
County Londonderry	2	County	Ireland	Londonderry	Theobald Jones	Tory
County Londonderry	2	County	Ireland	Londonderry	Sir Robert Bateson, Bt	Tory
County Longford	2	County	Ireland	Longford	Luke White	Irish Repeal
County Longford	2	County	Ireland	Longford	James Halpin Rorke	Irish Repeal
County Louth	2	County	Ireland	Louth	Thomas FitzGerald	Irish Repeal
County Louth	2	County	Ireland	Louth	Richard Bellew	Irish Repeal
Ludlow	2	Borough	England	Shropshire	Viscount Clive	Tory
Ludlow	2	Borough	England	Shropshire	Edward Romilly	Liberal
Lyme Regis	1	Borough	England	Dorset	William Pinney	Liberal
Lymington	2	Borough	England	Hampshire	Sir Harry Burrard-Neale, Bt	Tory
Lymington	2	Borough	England	Hampshire	John Stewart	Tory
