= List of MPs elected in the 1832 United Kingdom general election (Constituencies C) =

| Constituency | Seats | Type | Country | County | Member | Party |
|---|---|---|---|---|---|---|
| Caernarvon Boroughs | 1 | District | Wales | Caernarvonshire | Sir Charles Paget | Liberal |
| Caernarvonshire | 1 | County | Wales | Caernarvonshire | Thomas Assheton Smith | Tory |
| Caithness | 1 | County | Scotland | Buteshire/Caithness | George Sinclair | Liberal |
| Calne | 1 | Borough | England | Wiltshire | Earl of Kerry | Liberal |
| Cambridge | 2 | Borough | England | Cambridgeshire | George Pryme | Liberal |
| Cambridge | 2 | Borough | England | Cambridgeshire | Thomas Spring Rice | Liberal |
| Cambridge University | 2 | University | England | Cambridgeshire | Henry Goulburn | Tory |
| Cambridge University | 2 | University | England | Cambridgeshire | Charles Manners-Sutton | Tory |
| Cambridgeshire | 3 | County | England | Cambridgeshire | Richard Greaves Townley | Liberal |
| Cambridgeshire | 3 | County | England | Cambridgeshire | Charles Yorke | Tory |
| Cambridgeshire | 3 | County | England | Cambridgeshire | John Walbanke-Childers | Liberal |
| Canterbury | 2 | Borough | England | Kent | Richard Watson | Liberal |
| Canterbury | 2 | Borough | England | Kent | Viscount Fordwich | Liberal |
| Cardiff District | 1 | District | Wales | Glamorganshire | John Iltyd Nicholl | Tory |
| Cardigan District | 1 | District | Wales | Cardiganshire | Pryse Pryse | Liberal |
| Cardiganshire | 1 | County | Wales | Cardiganshire | William Edward Powell | Tory |
| Carlisle | 2 | Borough | England | Cumberland | William James | Liberal |
| Carlisle | 2 | Borough | England | Cumberland | Philip Henry Howard | Liberal |
| Carlow | 1 | Borough | Ireland | Carlow | Nicholas Aylward Vigors | Irish Repeal |
| County Carlow | 2 | County | Ireland | Carlow | Walter Blackney | Irish Repeal |
| County Carlow | 2 | County | Ireland | Carlow | Thomas Wallace | Liberal |
| Carmarthen Boroughs | 1 | District | Wales | Carmarthenshire | William Yelverton | Liberal |
| Carmarthenshire | 2 | County | Wales | Carmarthenshire | Hon. George Rice-Trevor | Tory |
| Carmarthenshire | 2 | County | Wales | Carmarthenshire | Edward Hamlyn Adams | Liberal |
| Carrickfergus | 1 | Borough | Ireland | Antrim | Conway Richard Dobbs | Tory |
| Cashel | 1 | Borough | Ireland | Tipperary | James Roe | Irish Repeal |
| Cavan | 2 | County | Ireland | Cavan | Henry Maxwell | Tory |
| Cavan | 2 | County | Ireland | Cavan | Sir John Young, Bt | Tory |
| Chatham | 1 | Borough | England | Kent | William Leader Maberly | Liberal |
| Cheltenham | 1 | Borough | England | Gloucestershire | Hon. Craven Berkeley | Liberal |
| Cheshire Northern | 2 | County | England | Cheshire | Hon. Edward Stanley | Liberal |
| Cheshire Northern | 2 | County | England | Cheshire | William Egerton | Tory |
| Cheshire Southern | 2 | County | England | Cheshire | George Wilbraham | Liberal |
| Cheshire Southern | 2 | County | England | Cheshire | Earl Grosvenor | Liberal |
| Chester | 2 | Borough | England | Cheshire | John Jervis | Liberal |
| Chester | 2 | Borough | England | Cheshire | Lord Robert Grosvenor | Liberal |
| Chichester | 2 | Borough | England | Sussex | Lord Arthur Lennox | Liberal |
| Chichester | 2 | Borough | England | Sussex | John Abel Smith | Liberal |
| Chippenham | 2 | Borough | England | Wiltshire | Joseph Neeld | Tory |
| Chippenham | 2 | Borough | England | Wiltshire | William Fox Talbot | Liberal |
| Christchurch | 1 | Borough | England | Hampshire | George William Tapps | Tory |
| Cirencester | 2 | Borough | England | Gloucestershire | Joseph Cripps | Tory |
| Cirencester | 2 | Borough | England | Gloucestershire | Lord Apsley | Tory |
| Clackmannans and Kinross | 1 | County | Scotland | Clackmannanshire | Sir Charles Adam | Liberal |
| Clare | 2 | County | Ireland | Clare | William Nugent Macnamara | Irish Repeal |
| Clare | 2 | County | Ireland | Clare | Cornelius O'Brien | Irish Repeal |
| Clitheroe | 1 | Borough | England | Lancashire | John Fort | Liberal |
| Clonmel | 1 | Borough | Ireland | Tipperary | Dominick Ronayne | Irish Repeal |
| Cockermouth | 2 | Borough | England | Cumberland | Fretchville Dykes | Liberal |
| Cockermouth | 2 | Borough | England | Cumberland | Henry Aglionby | Liberal |
| Colchester | 2 | Borough | England | Essex | Richard Sanderson | Tory |
| Colchester | 2 | Borough | England | Essex | Daniel Whittle Harvey | Liberal |
| Coleraine | 1 | Borough | Ireland | Londonderry | Sir John Beresford, Bt | Tory |
| Cork City | 2 | Borough | Ireland | Cork | Daniel Callaghan | Liberal |
| Cork City | 2 | Borough | Ireland | Cork | Herbert Baldwin | Irish Repeal |
| County Cork | 2 | County | Ireland | Cork | Feargus O'Connor | Irish Repeal |
| County Cork | 2 | County | Ireland | Cork | Garrett Standish Barry | Irish Repeal |
| Cornwall Eastern | 2 | County | England | Cornwall | Sir William Molesworth, Bt | Liberal |
| Cornwall Eastern | 2 | County | England | Cornwall | William Salusbury-Trelawny | Liberal |
| Cornwall Western | 2 | County | England | Cornwall | Sir Charles Lemon, Bt | Liberal |
| Cornwall Western | 2 | County | England | Cornwall | Edward Wynne-Pendarves | Liberal |
| Coventry | 2 | Borough | England | Warwickshire | Edward Ellice | Liberal |
| Coventry | 2 | Borough | England | Warwickshire | Henry Bulwer | Liberal |
| Cricklade | 2 | Borough | England | Wiltshire | Thomas Calley | Liberal |
| Cricklade | 2 | Borough | England | Wiltshire | Robert Gordon | Liberal |
| Cumberland Eastern | 2 | County | England | Cumberland | William Blamire | Liberal |
| Cumberland Eastern | 2 | County | England | Cumberland | Sir James Graham, Bt | Liberal |
| Cumberland Western | 2 | County | England | Cumberland | Viscount Lowther | Tory |
| Cumberland Western | 2 | County | England | Cumberland | Edward Stanley | Tory |
