= Dominick Ronayne =

Irish politician

Member of Parliament for Clonmel
- In office 1832 – 14 January 1836
- Preceded by: Eyre Coote
- Succeeded by: Nicholas Ball

Personal details
- Born: 1790
- Died: January 14, 1836
- Party: Whig (1835–1836)
- Other political affiliations: Repeal Association (1832–1835)
- Relations: Cousin of Daniel O'Connell
- Profession: Barrister

Dominick Ronanye (1790 – 14 January 1836) was an Irish politician.

Ronanye lived at Ringvine in County Waterford, and was a cousin of Daniel O'Connell. He served as a barrister. He stood in Dungarvan at the 1830 UK general election, but most of his voters were disallowed as they had instead registered in the County Waterford constituency, and he lost by 350 votes to 50.

At the 1832 UK general election, he stood in Clonmel and was elected for the Repeal Association. He was re-elected in the 1835 UK general election as a Whig, but died in January 1836, still in office.

Parliament of the United Kingdom
| Preceded by Eyre Coote | Member of Parliament for Clonmel; 1832–1836 | Succeeded by Nicholas Ball |
