= List of MPs elected in the 1832 United Kingdom general election (Constituencies F–I) =

Constituency	Seats	Type	Country	County	Member	Party
Falkirk Burghs	1	District	Scotland	Stirlingshire	William Downe Gillon	Liberal
Fermanagh	2	County	Ireland	Fermanagh	Mervyn Archdall	Tory
Fermanagh	2	County	Ireland	Fermanagh	Viscount Cole	Tory
Fife	1	County	Scotland	Fife	James Erskine Wemyss	Liberal
Finsbury	2	Borough	England	Middlesex	Robert Grant	Liberal
Finsbury	2	Borough	England	Middlesex	Robert Spankie	Tory
Flint Boroughs	1	District	Wales	Flintshire	Sir Stephen Glynne, Bt	Liberal
Flintshire	1	County	Wales	Flintshire	Edward Lloyd-Mostyn	Liberal
Forfarshire	1	County	Scotland	Forfarshire	Douglas Hallyburton	Liberal
Frome	1	Borough	England	Somerset	Thomas Sheppard	Liberal
Galway Borough	2	Borough	Ireland	Galway	Andrew Henry Lynch	Irish Repeal
Galway Borough	2	Borough	Ireland	Galway	Lachlan MacLachlan	Irish Repeal
County Galway	2	County	Ireland	Galway	Thomas Barnwall Martin	Liberal
County Galway	2	County	Ireland	Galway	James Daly	Tory
Gateshead	1	Borough	England	Durham	Cuthbert Rippon	Liberal
Glamorganshire	2	County	Wales	Glamorganshire	Christopher Rice Mansel Talbot	Liberal
Glamorganshire	2	County	Wales	Glamorganshire	Lewis Weston Dillwyn	Liberal
Glasgow	2	Burgh	Scotland	Lanarkshire	James Ewing	Liberal
Glasgow	2	Burgh	Scotland	Lanarkshire	James Oswald	Liberal
Gloucester	2	Borough	England	Gloucestershire	Maurice Berkeley	Liberal
Gloucester	2	Borough	England	Gloucestershire	Edward Webb	Liberal
Gloucestershire Eastern	2	County	England	Gloucestershire	Sir Berkeley Guise, Bt	Liberal
Gloucestershire Eastern	2	County	England	Gloucestershire	Hon. Henry Reynolds-Moreton	Liberal
Gloucestershire Western	2	County	England	Gloucestershire	Grantley Berkeley	Liberal
Gloucestershire Western	2	County	England	Gloucestershire	Hon. Augustus Moreton	Liberal
Grantham	2	Borough	England	Lincolnshire	Algernon Tollemache	Tory
Grantham	2	Borough	England	Lincolnshire	Glynne Earle Welby	Tory
Great Grimsby	1	Borough	England	Lincolnshire	William Maxfield	Liberal
Great Marlow	2	Borough	England	Buckinghamshire	William Clayton	Liberal
Great Marlow	2	Borough	England	Buckinghamshire	Thomas Peers Williams	Tory
Great Yarmouth	2	Borough	England	Norfolk	Charles Edmund Rumbold	Liberal
Great Yarmouth	2	Borough	England	Norfolk	Hon. George Anson	Liberal
Greenock	1	Burgh	Scotland	Renfrewshire	Robert Wallace	Liberal
Greenwich	2	Borough	England	Kent	James Whitley Deans Dundas	Liberal
Greenwich	2	Borough	England	Kent	Edward George Barnard	Liberal
Guildford	2	Borough	England	Surrey	James Mangles	Liberal
Guildford	2	Borough	England	Surrey	Charles Baring Wall	Tory
Haddington Burghs	1	District	Scotland	Haddingtonshire	Robert Steuart	Liberal
Haddingtonshire	1	County	Scotland	Haddingtonshire	James Balfour	Tory
Halifax	2	Borough	England	Yorkshire, West	Rawdon Briggs	Liberal
Halifax	2	Borough	England	Yorkshire, West	Charles Wood	Liberal
Hampshire Northern	2	County	England	Hampshire	Charles Shaw-Lefevre	Liberal
Hampshire Northern	2	County	England	Hampshire	James Winter Scott	Liberal
Hampshire Southern	2	County	England	Hampshire	The Viscount Palmerston	Liberal
Hampshire Southern	2	County	England	Hampshire	Sir George Staunton, Bt	Liberal
Harwich	2	Borough	England	Essex	John Charles Herries	Tory
Harwich	2	Borough	England	Essex	Christopher Thomas Tower	Liberal
Hastings	2	Borough	England	Sussex	Frederick North	Liberal
Hastings	2	Borough	England	Sussex	John Ashley Warre	Liberal
Haverfordwest	1	District	Wales	Pembrokeshire	Sir Richard Bulkeley Philipps, Bt	Liberal
Helston	1	Borough	England	Cornwall	Sackville Walter Lane-Fox	Tory
Hereford	2	Borough	England	Herefordshire	Edward Clive	Liberal
Hereford	2	Borough	England	Herefordshire	Robert Biddulph	Liberal
Herefordshire	3	County	England	Herefordshire	Edward Thomas Foley	Tory
Herefordshire	3	County	England	Herefordshire	Kedgwin Hoskins	Liberal
Herefordshire	3	County	England	Herefordshire	Sir Robert Price, Bt	Liberal
Hertford	2	Borough	England	Hertfordshire	Viscount Ingestrie	Tory
Hertford	2	Borough	England	Hertfordshire	Viscount Mahon	Tory
Hertfordshire	3	County	England	Hertfordshire	Sir John Sebright, Bt	Liberal
Hertfordshire	3	County	England	Hertfordshire	Nicolson Calvert	Liberal
Hertfordshire	3	County	England	Hertfordshire	Viscount Grimston	Tory
Honiton	2	Borough	England	Devon	Viscount Villiers	Tory
Honiton	2	Borough	England	Devon	James Ruddell-Todd	Liberal
Horsham	1	Borough	England	Sussex	Robert Henry Hurst	Liberal
Huddersfield	1	Borough	England	Yorkshire, West	Lewis Fenton	Liberal
Huntingdon	2	Borough	England	Huntingdonshire	Jonathan Peel	Tory
Huntingdon	2	Borough	England	Huntingdonshire	Frederick Pollock	Tory
Huntingdonshire	2	County	England	Huntingdonshire	Viscount Mandeville	Tory
Huntingdonshire	2	County	England	Huntingdonshire	John Bonfoy Rooper	Liberal
Hythe	1	Borough	England	Kent	Stewart Marjoribanks	Liberal
Inverness Burghs	1	District	Scotland	Inverness-shire	John Baillie	Tory
Inverness-shire	1	County	Scotland	Inverness-shire	Charles Grant	Liberal
Ipswich	2	Borough	England	Suffolk	James Morrison	Liberal
Ipswich	2	Borough	England	Suffolk	Rigby Wason	Liberal
Isle of Wight	1	County	England	Hampshire	Sir Richard Simeon, Bt	Liberal
