= List of MPs elected in the 1832 United Kingdom general election (Constituencies D–E) =

| Constituency | Seats | Type | Country | County | Member | Party |
|---|---|---|---|---|---|---|
| Dartmouth | 1 | Borough | England | Devon | John Seale | Liberal |
| Denbigh Boroughs | 1 | District | Wales | Denbighshire | John Madocks | Liberal |
| Denbighshire | 2 | County | Wales | Denbighshire | Sir Watkin Williams-Wynn, Bt | Tory |
| Denbighshire | 2 | County | Wales | Denbighshire | Robert Myddleton-Biddulph | Liberal |
| Derby | 2 | Borough | England | Derbyshire | Edward Strutt | Liberal |
| Derby | 2 | Borough | England | Derbyshire | Henry Cavendish | Liberal |
| Derbyshire Northern | 2 | County | England | Derbyshire | Lord Cavendish of Keighley | Liberal |
| Derbyshire Northern | 2 | County | England | Derbyshire | Thomas Gisborne | Liberal |
| Derbyshire Southern | 2 | County | England | Derbyshire | Hon. George Venables-Vernon | Liberal |
| Derbyshire Southern | 2 | County | England | Derbyshire | The Lord Waterpark | Liberal |
| Devizes | 2 | Borough | England | Wiltshire | Wadham Locke | Liberal |
| Devizes | 2 | Borough | England | Wiltshire | Montague Gore | Liberal |
| Devonport | 2 | Borough | England | Devon | Sir Edward Codrington | Liberal |
| Devonport | 2 | Borough | England | Devon | Sir George Grey, Bt | Liberal |
| Devon Northern | 2 | County | England | Devon | Viscount Ebrington | Liberal |
| Devon Northern | 2 | County | England | Devon | Hon. Newton Fellowes | Liberal |
| Devon Southern | 2 | County | England | Devon | Lord John Russell | Liberal |
| Devon Southern | 2 | County | England | Devon | John Crocker Bulteel | Liberal |
| Donegal | 2 | County | Ireland | Donegal | Edmund Hayes | Tory |
| Donegal | 2 | County | Ireland | Donegal | Edward Conolly | Tory |
| Dorchester | 2 | Borough | England | Dorset | Anthony Henry Ashley-Cooper | Tory |
| Dorchester | 2 | Borough | England | Dorset | Robert Williams | Tory |
| Dorset | 3 | County | England | Dorset | Lord Ashley | Tory |
| Dorset | 3 | County | England | Dorset | William John Bankes | Tory |
| Dorset | 3 | County | England | Dorset | Hon. William Ponsonby | Liberal |
| Dover | 2 | Borough | England | Kent | Charles Poulett Thomson | Liberal |
| Dover | 2 | Borough | England | Kent | Sir John Rae Reid, Bt | Tory |
| Down | 2 | County | Ireland | Down | Lord Arthur Hill | Liberal |
| Down | 2 | County | Ireland | Down | Viscount Castlereagh | Tory |
| Downpatrick | 1 | Borough | Ireland | Down | John Waring Maxwell | Tory |
| Drogheda | 1 | Borough | Ireland | Louth | Andrew Carew O'Dwyer | Repeal |
| Droitwich | 1 | Borough | England | Worcestershire | John Hodgetts-Foley | Liberal |
| Dublin | 2 | Borough | Ireland | Dublin | Daniel O'Connell | Repeal |
| Dublin | 2 | Borough | Ireland | Dublin | Edward Southwell Ruthven | Repeal |
| County Dublin | 2 | County | Ireland | Dublin | Christopher Fitzsimon | Repeal |
| County Dublin | 2 | County | Ireland | Dublin | George Hampden Evans | Liberal |
| Dublin University | 2 | University | Ireland | Dublin | Thomas Langlois Lefroy | Tory |
| Dublin University | 2 | University | Ireland | Dublin | Sir Frederick Shaw, Bt | Tory |
| Dudley | 1 | Borough | England | Worcestershire | Sir John Campbell | Liberal |
| Dumfries Burghs | 1 | District | Scotland | Dumfriesshire | Matthew Sharpe | Liberal |
| Dumfriesshire | 1 | County | Scotland | Dumfriesshire | John Hope-Johnstone | Tory |
| Dunbartonshire | 1 | County | Scotland | Dunbartonshire | John Campbell Colquhoun | Liberal |
| Dundalk | 1 | Borough | Ireland | Louth | William O'Reilly | Liberal |
| Dundee | 1 | Burgh | Scotland | Forfarshire | George Kinloch | Liberal |
| Dungannon | 1 | Borough | Ireland | Tyrone | John James Knox | Tory |
| Dungarvan | 1 | Borough | Ireland | Waterford | Hon. George Lamb | Liberal |
| Durham City | 2 | Borough | England | Durham | William Chaytor | Liberal |
| Durham City | 2 | Borough | England | Durham | William Charles Harland | Liberal |
| Durham Northern | 2 | County | England | Durham | Hedworth Lambton | Liberal |
| Durham Northern | 2 | County | England | Durham | Sir Hedworth Williamson, Bt | Liberal |
| Durham Southern | 2 | County | England | Durham | Joseph Pease | Liberal |
| Durham Southern | 2 | County | England | Durham | John Bowes | Liberal |
| East Retford | 2 | Borough | England | Nottinghamshire | Granville Harcourt-Vernon | Liberal |
| East Retford | 2 | Borough | England | Nottinghamshire | Viscount Newark | Liberal |
| Edinburgh | 2 | Burgh | Scotland | Midlothian | Francis Jeffrey | Liberal |
| Edinburgh | 2 | Burgh | Scotland | Midlothian | James Abercromby | Liberal |
| Elgin Burghs | 1 | District | Scotland | Elginshire | Sir Andrew Leith Hay | Liberal |
| Elginshire and Nairnshire | 1 | County | Scotland | Elginshire/Nairnshire | Francis William Grant | Tory |
| Ennis | 1 | Borough | Ireland | Clare | Francis Macnamara | Repeal |
| Enniskillen | 1 | Borough | Ireland | Fermanagh | Arthur Henry Cole | Tory |
| Essex Northern | 2 | County | England | Essex | Sir John Tyssen Tyrell, Bt | Tory |
| Essex Northern | 2 | County | England | Essex | Alexander Baring | Tory |
| Essex Southern | 2 | County | England | Essex | Robert Westley Hall-Dare | Tory |
| Essex Southern | 2 | County | England | Essex | Sir Thomas Barrett-Lennard, Bt | Liberal |
| Evesham | 2 | Borough | England | Worcestershire | Sir Charles Cockerell, Bt | Liberal |
| Evesham | 2 | Borough | England | Worcestershire | Thomas Hudson | Liberal |
| Exeter | 2 | Borough | England | Devon | James Wentworth Buller | Liberal |
| Exeter | 2 | Borough | England | Devon | Edward Divett | Liberal |
| Eye | 1 | Borough | England | Suffolk | Francis Seymour Stevenson | Tory |
