= List of MPs elected in the 1832 United Kingdom general election (Constituencies O–R) =

Constituency	Seats	Type	Country	County	Member	Party
Oldham	2	Borough	England	Lancashire	John Fielden	Liberal
Oldham	2	Borough	England	Lancashire	William Cobbett	Liberal
Orkney and Shetland	1	County	Scotland	Orkney & Shetland	George Traill	Liberal
Oxford	2	Borough	England	Oxfordshire	James Haughton Langston	Liberal
Oxford	2	Borough	England	Oxfordshire	Thomas Stonor	Liberal
Oxfordshire	3	County	England	Oxfordshire	George Granville Harcourt	Liberal
Oxfordshire	3	County	England	Oxfordshire	Lord Norreys	Tory
Oxfordshire	3	County	England	Oxfordshire	Richard Weyland	Liberal
Oxford University	2	University	England	Oxfordshire	Thomas Estcourt·	Tory
Oxford University	2	University	England	Oxfordshire	Sir Robert Inglis, Bt	Tory
Paisley	1	Burgh	Scotland	Renfrewshire	Sir John Maxwell, Bt	Liberal
Peeblesshire	1	County	Scotland	Peeblesshire	Sir John Hay, Bt	Tory
Pembroke Boroughs	1	District	Wales	Pembrokeshire	Hugh Owen Owen	Tory
Pembrokeshire	1	County	Wales	Pembrokeshire	Sir John Owen, Bt	Tory
Penryn and Falmouth	2	Borough	England	Cornwall	Robert Rolfe	Liberal
Penryn and Falmouth	2	Borough	England	Cornwall	Lord Tullamore	Tory
Perth	1	Burgh	Scotland	Perthshire	Laurence Oliphant	Liberal
Perthshire	1	County	Scotland	Perthshire	Earl of Ormelie	Liberal
Peterborough	2	Borough	England	Northamptonshire	John Nicholas Fazakerley	Liberal
Peterborough	2	Borough	England	Northamptonshire	Sir Robert Heron, Bt	Liberal
Petersfield	1	Borough	England	Hampshire	John Shaw-Lefevre	Liberal
Plymouth	2	Borough	England	Devon	Thomas Bewes	Liberal
Plymouth	2	Borough	England	Devon	John Collier	Liberal
Pontefract	2	Borough	England	Yorkshire, West	John Gully	Liberal
Pontefract	2	Borough	England	Yorkshire, West	Hon. Henry Stafford-Jerningham	Liberal
Poole	2	Borough	England	Dorset	Benjamin Lester	Liberal
Poole	2	Borough	England	Dorset	John Byng	Liberal
Portarlington	1	Borough	Ireland	Queen's County/King's County	Thomas Gladstone	Tory
Portsmouth	2	Borough	England	Hampshire	John Bonham-Carter	Liberal
Portsmouth	2	Borough	England	Hampshire	Francis Thornhill Baring	Liberal
Preston	2	Borough	England	Lancashire	Peter Hesketh-Fleetwood	Tory
Preston	2	Borough	England	Lancashire	Hon. Henry Smith-Stanley	Liberal
Queen's County	2	County	Ireland	Queen's County	Patrick Lalor	Irish Repeal
Queen's County	2	County	Ireland	Queen's County	Sir Charles Coote, Bt	Tory
Radnor Boroughs	1	District	Wales	Radnorshire	Richard Price	Tory
Radnorshire	1	County	Wales	Radnorshire	Thomas Frankland Lewis	Tory
Reading	2	Borough	England	Berkshire	Charles Fyshe Palmer	Liberal
Reading	2	Borough	England	Berkshire	Charles Russell	Tory
Reigate	1	Borough	England	Surrey	Viscount Eastnor	Tory
Renfrewshire	1	County	Scotland	Renfrewshire	Sir Michael Shaw-Stewart, Bt	Liberal
Richmond	2	Borough	England	Yorkshire, North	Hon. John Dundas	Liberal
Richmond	2	Borough	England	Yorkshire, North	Sir Robert Lawrence Dundas	Liberal
Ripon	2	Borough	England	Yorkshire, West	Thomas Staveley	Liberal
Ripon	2	Borough	England	Yorkshire, West	Joshua Crompton	Liberal
Rochdale	1	Borough	England	Lancashire	John Fenton	Liberal
Rochester	2	Borough	England	Kent	Ralph Bernal	Liberal
Rochester	2	Borough	England	Kent	John Mills	Tory
Roscommon	2	County	Ireland	Roscommon	Fitzstephen French	Liberal
Roscommon	2	County	Ireland	Roscommon	The O'Conor Don	Irish Repeal
Ross and Cromarty	1	County	Scotland	Ross-shire/Cromartyshire	James Stewart-Mackenzie	Liberal
Roxburghshire	1	County	Scotland	Roxburghshire	George Elliot	Liberal
Rutland	2	County	England	Rutland	Sir Gerard Noel, Bt.	Tory
Rutland	2	County	England	Rutland	Sir Gilbert Heathcote, Bt.	Liberal
Rye	1	Borough	England	Sussex	Edward Barrett Curteis	Liberal
