= James Roe (Irish politician) =

Irish politician (19th century)

James Roe was an Irish politician.

Roe lived at Roesborough in County Tipperary, and served as a solicitor. He stood in County Tipperary at the 1826 UK general election, where he was unsuccessful, withdrawing after several days of polling had taken place. In August 1828, he founded a county liberal club, becoming its president. He was asked to stand again at the 1830 UK general election, but declined, contending that there was insufficient time to prepare for the poll.

At the 1832 UK general election, Roe stood for the Irish Repeal Association in Cashel. The seat had previously been represented by a Tory, but the passing of the Great Reform Act had enfranchised many new voters, and the Tories did not stand a candidate. Roe won the seat unopposed. He held it until 1834, when he stood down.

Parliament of the United Kingdom
Preceded by Philip Pusey	Member of Parliament for Cashel; 1832 – 1834	Succeeded by Louis Perrin
