= List of MPs elected in the 1832 United Kingdom general election (Constituencies U–Z) =

Constituency	Seats	Type	Country	County	Member	Party
Wakefield	1	Borough	England	Yorkshire, West	Daniel Gaskell	Liberal
Wallingford	1	Borough	England	Berkshire	William Seymour Blackstone	Tory
Walsall	1	Borough	England	Staffordshire	Charles Smith Forster	Tory
Wareham	1	Borough	England	Dorset	John Hales Calcraft	Tory
Warrington	1	Borough	England	Lancashire	Edmund George Hornby	Liberal
Warwick	2	Borough	England	Warwickshire	Sir Charles Greville	Tory
Warwick	2	Borough	England	Warwickshire	Edward Bolton King	Liberal
Warwickshire Northern	2	County	England	Warwickshire	Sir John Eardley-Wilmot, Bt	Tory
Warwickshire Northern	2	County	England	Warwickshire	William Stratford Dugdale	Tory
Warwickshire Southern	2	County	England	Warwickshire	Sir Grey Skipwith, Bt	Liberal
Warwickshire Southern	2	County	England	Warwickshire	Sir George Philips, Bt	Liberal
Waterford City	2	Borough	Ireland	Waterford	Henry Barron	Repeal
Waterford City	2	Borough	Ireland	Waterford	William Christmas	Tory
County Waterford	2	County	Ireland	Waterford	John Matthew Galwey	Repeal
County Waterford	2	County	Ireland	Waterford	Sir Richard Keane, Bt	Liberal
Wells	2	Borough	England	Somerset	Norman Lamont	Liberal
Wells	2	Borough	England	Somerset	John Lee Lee	Liberal
Wenlock	2	Borough	England	Shropshire	George Weld-Forester	Tory
Wenlock	2	Borough	England	Shropshire	James Milnes Gaskell	Tory
Westbury	1	Borough	England	Wiltshire	Sir Ralph Lopes, Bt	Liberal
Westmeath	2	County	Ireland	Westmeath	Montagu Lowther Chapman	Liberal
Westmeath	2	County	Ireland	Westmeath	Sir Richard Nagle, Bt	Repeal
Westminster	2	Borough	England	Middlesex	Sir Francis Burdett, Bt	Liberal
Westminster	2	Borough	England	Middlesex	Sir John Cam Hobhouse, Bt	Liberal
Westmorland	2	County	England	Westmorland	Viscount Lowther	Tory
Westmorland	2	County	England	Westmorland	Henry Cecil Lowther	Tory
Wexford	1	Borough	Ireland	Wexford	Charles Arthur Walker	Repeal
County Wexford	2	County	Ireland	Wexford	Robert Carew	Liberal
County Wexford	2	County	Ireland	Wexford	Henry Lambert	Liberal
Weymouth and Melcombe Regis	2	Borough	England	Dorset	Thomas Fowell Buxton	Liberal
Weymouth and Melcombe Regis	2	Borough	England	Dorset	Sir Frederick Johnstone, Bt	Tory
Whitby	1	Borough	England	Yorkshire, North	Aaron Chapman	Tory
Whitehaven	1	Borough	England	Cumberland	Matthias Attwood	Tory
Wick Burghs	1	District	Scotland	Caithness	James Loch	Liberal
Wicklow	2	County	Ireland	Wicklow	Ralph Howard	Liberal
Wicklow	2	County	Ireland	Wicklow	James Grattan	Liberal
Wigan	2	Borough	England	Lancashire	Ralph Thicknesse	Liberal
Wigan	2	Borough	England	Lancashire	Richard Potter	Liberal
Wigtown Burghs	1	District	Scotland	Wigtownshire	Edward Stewart	Liberal
Wigtownshire	1	County	Scotland	Wigtownshire	Sir Andrew Agnew, Bt	Liberal
Wilton	1	Borough	England	Wiltshire	John Penruddocke	Tory
Wiltshire Northern	2	County	England	Wiltshire	Paul Methuen	Liberal
Wiltshire Northern	2	County	England	Wiltshire	Sir John Astley, Bt	Liberal
Wiltshire Southern	2	County	England	Wiltshire	John Bennett	Liberal
Wiltshire Southern	2	County	England	Wiltshire	Sidney Herbert	Tory
Winchester	2	Borough	England	Hampshire	Bingham Baring	Liberal
Winchester	2	Borough	England	Hampshire	Paulet St John-Mildmay	Liberal
Windsor	2	Borough	England	Berkshire	Samuel Pechell	Liberal
Windsor	2	Borough	England	Berkshire	John Ramsbottom	Liberal
Wolverhampton	2	Borough	England	Staffordshire	William Wolryche-Whitmore	Liberal
Wolverhampton	2	Borough	England	Staffordshire	Richard Fryer	Liberal
Woodstock	1	Borough	England	Oxfordshire	Marquess of Blandford	Tory
Worcester	2	Borough	England	Worcestershire	Thomas Davies	Liberal
Worcester	2	Borough	England	Worcestershire	George Richard Robinson	Liberal
Worcestershire Eastern	2	County	England	Worcestershire	William Congreve Russell	Liberal
Worcestershire Eastern	2	County	England	Worcestershire	Thomas Cookes	Liberal
Worcestershire Western	2	County	England	Worcestershire	Hon. Henry Lygon	Tory
Worcestershire Western	2	County	England	Worcestershire	Hon. Thomas Foley	Liberal
Wycombe	2	Borough	England	Buckinghamshire	Charles Grey	Liberal
Wycombe	2	Borough	England	Buckinghamshire	Hon. Robert Smith	Liberal
York	2	Borough	England	Yorkshire	Edward Petre	Liberal
York	2	Borough	England	Yorkshire	Samuel Adlam Bayntun	Liberal
East Riding of Yorkshire	2	County	England	Yorkshire, East	Richard Bethell	Tory
East Riding of Yorkshire	2	County	England	Yorkshire, East	Paul Thompson	Liberal
North Riding of Yorkshire	2	County	England	Yorkshire, North	Hon. William Duncombe	Tory
North Riding of Yorkshire	2	County	England	Yorkshire, North	Edward Stillingfleet Cayley	Liberal
West Riding of Yorkshire	2	County	England	Yorkshire, West	Viscount Morpeth	Liberal
West Riding of Yorkshire	2	County	England	Yorkshire, West	Sir George Strickland, Bt	Liberal
Youghal	1	Borough	Ireland	Cork	John O'Connell	Repeal
