= List of MPs elected in the 1832 United Kingdom general election (Constituencies M–N) =

The 1832 United Kingdom general election, the first after the Reform Act, saw the Whigs win a large majority, with the Tories winning less than 30% of the vote.

Constituency	Seats	Type	Country	County	Member	Party
Macclesfield	2	Borough	England	Cheshire	John Ryle	Tory
Macclesfield	2	Borough	England	Cheshire	John Brocklehurst	Liberal
Maidstone	2	Borough	England	Kent	Abraham Wildey Robarts	Liberal
Maidstone	2	Borough	England	Kent	Charles James Barnett	Liberal
Maldon	2	Borough	England	Essex	Thomas Barrett Lennard	Liberal
Maldon	2	Borough	England	Essex	Quintin Dick	Tory
Mallow	1	Borough	Ireland	Cork	William Daunt	Repeal
Malmesbury	1	Borough	England	Wiltshire	Viscount Andover	Liberal
Malton	2	Borough	England	Yorkshire, North/East	William Fitzwilliam	Liberal
Malton	2	Borough	England	Yorkshire, North/East	Charles Pepys	Liberal
Manchester	2	Borough	England	Lancashire	Mark Philips	Liberal
Manchester	2	Borough	England	Lancashire	Charles Poulett Thomson	Liberal
Marlborough	2	Borough	England	Wiltshire	Lord Ernest Brudenell-Bruce	Tory
Marlborough	2	Borough	England	Wiltshire	Henry Bingham Baring	Tory
Marylebone	2	Borough	England	Middlesex	Edward Berkeley Portman	Liberal
Marylebone	2	Borough	England	Middlesex	Sir William Horne	Liberal
Mayo	2	County	Ireland	Mayo	John Browne	Liberal
Mayo	2	County	Ireland	Mayo	Dominick Browne	Liberal
Meath	2	County	Ireland	Meath	Morgan O'Connell	Repeal
Meath	2	County	Ireland	Meath	Henry Grattan	Repeal
Merionethshire	1	County	Wales	Merionethshire	Sir Robert Vaughan, Bt.	Tory
Merthyr Tydvil	1	Borough	Wales	Glamorganshire	John Josiah Guest	Liberal
Middlesex	2	County	England	Middlesex	Joseph Hume	Liberal
Middlesex	2	County	England	Middlesex	George Byng	Liberal
Midhurst	1	Borough	England	Sussex	Hon. Frederick Spencer	Liberal
Midlothian (aka Edinburghshire)	1	County	Scotland	Midlothian	Sir John Dalrymple, Bt	Liberal
Monaghan	2	County	Ireland	Monaghan	Cadwallader Blayney	Tory
Monaghan	2	County	Ireland	Monaghan	Hon. Henry Westenra	Liberal
Monmouth Boroughs	1	District	Wales	Monmouthshire	Benjamin Hall	Liberal
Monmouthshire	2	County	Wales	Monmouthshire	Lord Granville Somerset	Tory
Monmouthshire	2	County	Wales	Monmouthshire	William Addams Williams	Liberal
Montgomery Boroughs	1	District	Wales	Montgomeryshire	David Pugh	Tory
Montgomeryshire	1	County	Wales	Montgomeryshire	Charles Williams-Wynn	Tory
Montrose Burghs	1	District	Scotland	Forfarshire	Horatio Ross	Liberal
Morpeth	1	Borough	England	Northumberland	Frederick George Howard	Liberal
Newark-on-Trent	2	Borough	England	Nottinghamshire	William Ewart Gladstone	Tory
Newark-on-Trent	2	Borough	England	Nottinghamshire	William Farnworth Handley	Tory
Newcastle-under-Lyme	2	Borough	England	Staffordshire	William Henry Miller	Tory
Newcastle-under-Lyme	2	Borough	England	Staffordshire	Sir Henry Willoughby, Bt	Tory
Newcastle-upon-Tyne	2	Borough	England	Northumberland	Sir Matthew White Ridley, Bt	Liberal
Newcastle-upon-Tyne	2	Borough	England	Northumberland	John Hodgson	Tory
Newport	2	Borough	England	Hampshire	John Heywood Hawkins	Liberal
Newport	2	Borough	England	Hampshire	William Henry Ord	Liberal
New Ross	1	Borough	Ireland	Wexford	John Hyacinth Talbot	Repeal
Newry	1	Borough	Ireland	Armagh/Down	Lord Marcus Hill	Tory
New Shoreham	2	Borough	England	Sussex	Sir Charles Burrell, Bt	Tory
New Shoreham	2	Borough	England	Sussex	Harry Goring	Liberal
Norfolk Eastern	2	County	England	Norfolk	William Howe Windham	Liberal
Norfolk Eastern	2	County	England	Norfolk	Hon. George Keppel	Liberal
Norfolk Western	2	County	England	Norfolk	Sir Jacob Astley, Bt	Liberal
Norfolk Western	2	County	England	Norfolk	Sir William Ffolkes, Bt	Liberal
Northallerton	1	Borough	England	Yorkshire, North	John George Boss	Liberal
Northampton	2	Borough	England	Northamptonshire	Robert Vernon Smith	Liberal
Northampton	2	Borough	England	Northamptonshire	Charles Ross	Tory
Northamptonshire Northern	2	County	England	Northamptonshire	Viscount Milton	Liberal
Northamptonshire Northern	2	County	England	Northamptonshire	Lord James Brudenell	Tory
Northamptonshire Southern	2	County	England	Northamptonshire	Viscount Althorp	Liberal
Northamptonshire Southern	2	County	England	Northamptonshire	William Ralph Cartwright	Tory
Northumberland Northern	2	County	England	Northumberland	Viscount Howick	Liberal
Northumberland Northern	2	County	England	Northumberland	Lord Ossulston	Tory
Northumberland Southern	2	County	England	Northumberland	Thomas Wentworth Beaumont	Liberal
Northumberland Southern	2	County	England	Northumberland	Matthew Bell	Tory
Norwich	2	Borough	England	Norfolk	Viscount Stormont	Tory
Norwich	2	Borough	England	Norfolk	Sir James Scarlett	Tory
Nottingham	2	Borough	England	Nottinghamshire	Sir Ronald Craufurd Ferguson	Liberal
Nottingham	2	Borough	England	Nottinghamshire	Viscount Duncannon	Liberal
Nottinghamshire Northern	2	County	England	Nottinghamshire	Viscount Lumley	Liberal
Nottinghamshire Northern	2	County	England	Nottinghamshire	Thomas Houldsworth	Tory
Nottinghamshire Southern	2	County	England	Nottinghamshire	Evelyn Denison	Liberal
Nottinghamshire Southern	2	County	England	Nottinghamshire	Earl of Lincoln	Tory
