= 1830 United Kingdom general election =

- 29 July – 1 September 1830

All 658 seats in the House of Commons 330 seats needed for a majority
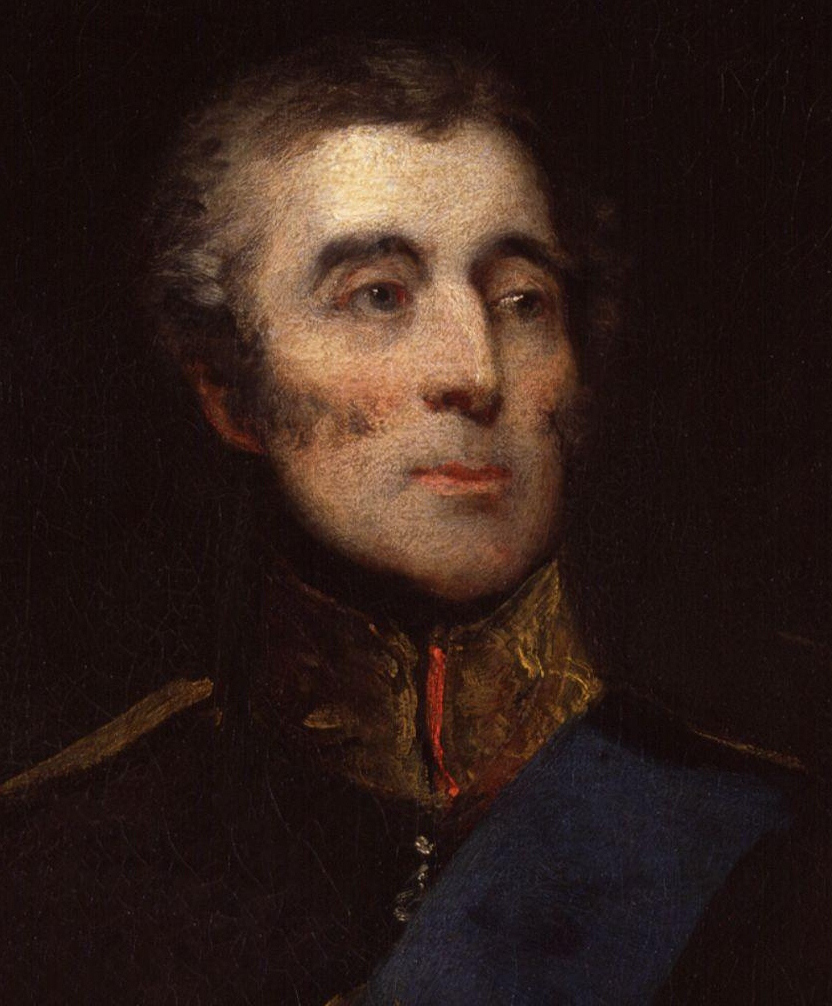

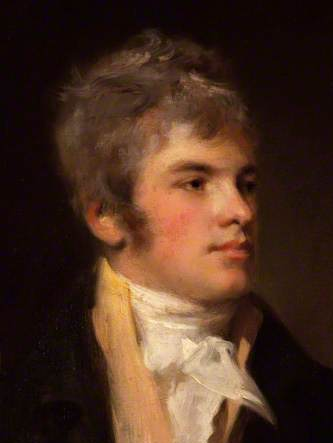

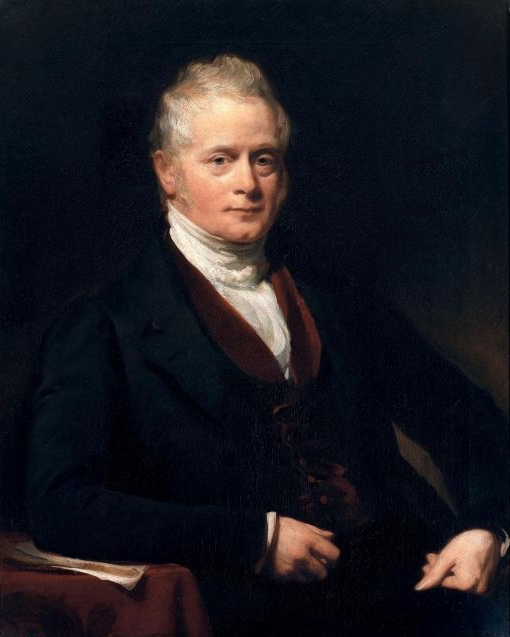
	First party	Second party	Third party
Leader	Duke of Wellington	Marquess of Lansdowne	Sir Edward Knatchbull
Party	Tory	Whig	Ultra-Tories
Leader since	22 January 1828	1824	1829
Leader's seat	House of Lords	House of Lords	Kent
Seats before	428 seats	198 seats	New party
Seats won	250	196	60
Seat change	▼178	▼2	▲60
Popular vote	62,554	96,536	2,305
Percentage	38.4%	59.3%	1.4%
- Colours denote the winning party

- Composition of the House of Commons after the election
Prime Minister before election
Duke of Wellington
Tory
Prime Minister after vote of no confidence
Earl Grey
Whig

The 1830 United Kingdom general election was held on 29 July 1830 to 1 September 1830 in the wake of the death of King George IV, producing the first parliament of the reign of his successor, King William IV. The fractured Tory party under Arthur Wellesley, 1st Duke of Wellington paved the way for Charles Grey, 2nd Earl Grey to form a government, which would go on to take the issue of electoral reform the following year.

The eighth United Kingdom Parliament was dissolved on 24 July 1830. The new Parliament was summoned to meet on 14 September 1830, for a maximum seven-year term from that date. The maximum term could be and normally was curtailed, by the monarch dissolving the Parliament, before its term expired. This election was the first since 1708 to cause the collapse of the government.

== Political situation ==
The Tory leader, at the time of the 1830 election, was the Duke of Wellington. He had been Prime Minister since 1828.

The previous Parliament had been unstable, with both principal parties fractured. During the 1826–30 Parliament, there had been four Tory prime ministers. The Earl of Liverpool, who had been Prime Minister since 1812, was forced by ill health to retire in 1827.

George Canning, who had been Leader of the House of Commons under Liverpool, became Prime Minister in early 1827. The High Tories, led by the Duke of Wellington and Robert Peel, refused to serve in his government. Canning invited a section of the Whigs, including Lansdowne to join a coalition ministry with the Canningite faction of the Tories. Other Whigs, like Earl Grey, remained in opposition. Some Whigs like Viscount Althorp adopted a neutral attitude to the government.

After Canning's death in August 1827, the premiership passed to Viscount Goderich for a few more months, until Wellington took over on 22 January 1828. Those Whigs who had been in both Canning's and Goderich's governments returned to the Opposition. For a short while a band of MPs and peers who had been supporters of Canning (hence the Canningites) were in included in Wellington's government but left on the issue of the re-distribution of seats from the corrupt parliamentary borough of East Retford in May 1828.

There was a further split in the Tory administration in 1829 on the issue of Catholic emancipation when Daniel O'Connell and his Catholic Association won a parliamentary seat. O'Connell was legally barred from taking his seat in the House of Commons because he was a Catholic, so Wellington's government was forced to bring about a change but that led to another split in their party – this time with the creation of the 'Ultra-Tory' group led by Edward Knatchbull MP and supported by a number of influential peers in the House of Lords.

There had not been a predominantly Whig administration since the Ministry of all the Talents in 1806–07. The Whig Party had had weak leadership, particularly in the House of Commons, for many years. However, during the 1826–30 Parliament the situation improved.

At the time of the general election, the Earl Grey was the leading figure amongst the Whig peers. However Grey had given up the formal leadership in 1824. The Marquess of Lansdowne was acting as leader, but had not taken up the title. The animosity which King George IV had to Earl Grey had barred him from government, but in the new reign his chances of office had improved.

There had been no official Leader of the Opposition in the House of Commons since 1821, but in 1830 the Whigs selected Viscount Althorp to fill the vacancy.

In Irish politics, Daniel O'Connell and his Catholic Association had succeeded in obtaining Catholic emancipation in 1829. However this measure was accompanied with an increase in the property qualification for Irish county voters, from a £2 freehold to a £20 one. For the first time since the penal laws were enacted in the seventeenth century Catholics in Ireland could serve in Parliament. With emancipation achieved, O'Connell was free to pursue his other aim with a campaign for repeal of the Act of Union.

== Dates of election ==
At this period there was not one election day. After receiving a writ (a royal command) for the election to be held, the local returning officer fixed the election timetable for the particular constituency or constituencies he was concerned with. Polling in seats with contested elections could continue for many days.

The general election took place between the first contest on 29 July and the last contest on 1 September 1830.

== Summary of the constituencies ==
Monmouthshire (1 County constituency with 2 MPs and one single member Borough constituency) is included in Wales in these tables. Sources for this period may include the county in England.

Table 1: Constituencies and MPs, by type and country

Country	BC	CC	UC	Total C	BMP	CMP	UMP	Total MPs
England	201	39	2	242	402	80	4	486
Wales	13	13	0	26	13	14	0	27
Scotland	15	30	0	45	15	30	0	45
Ireland	33	32	1	66	35	64	1	100
Total	262	114	3	379	465	188	5	658

Table 2: Number of seats per constituency, by type and country

Country	BCx1	BCx2	BCx4	CCx1	CCx2	CCx4	UCx1	UCx2	Total C
England	4	195	2	0	38	1	0	2	242
Wales	13	0	0	12	1	0	0	0	26
Scotland	15	0	0	30	0	0	0	0	45
Ireland	31	2	0	0	32	0	1	0	66
Total	63	197	2	42	71	1	1	2	379

== See also ==
- List of United Kingdom general elections
- List of MPs elected in the 1830 United Kingdom general election
- List of MPs elected in the 1832 United Kingdom general election

== Sources ==
- British Electoral Facts 1832–1999, compiled and edited by Colin Rallings and Michael Thrasher (Ashgate Publishing Ltd 2000). Source: Dates of Elections – Footnote to Table 5.02
- British Historical Facts 1760–1830, by Chris Cook and John Stevenson (The Macmillan Press 1980). Source: Types of constituencies – Great Britain
- His Majesty's Opposition 1714–1830, by Archibald S. Foord (Oxford University Press 1964)
- Parliamentary Election Results in Ireland 1801–1922, edited by B.M. Walker (Royal Irish Academy 1978). Source: Types of constituencies – Ireland
