= List of MPs elected in the 1832 United Kingdom general election (Constituencies A–B) =

Constituency	Seats	Type	Country	County	Member	Party
Aberdeen	1	Burgh	Scotland	Aberdeenshire	Alexander Bannerman	Liberal
Aberdeenshire	1	County	Scotland	Aberdeenshire	Capt. William Gordon	Tory
Abingdon	1	Borough	England	Berkshire	Thomas Duffield	Tory
Andover	2	Borough	England	Hampshire	Henry Arthur Wallop Fellowes	Liberal
Andover	2	Borough	England	Hampshire	Ralph Etwall	Liberal
Anglesey	1	County	Wales	Anglesey	Sir Richard Williams-Bulkeley, Bt	Liberal
Antrim	2	County	Ireland	Antrim	John O'Neill	Tory
Antrim	2	County	Ireland	Antrim	Earl of Belfast	Liberal
Argyllshire	1	County	Scotland	Argyllshire	James Henry Callander	Liberal
Armagh	1	Borough	Ireland	Armagh	Leonard Dobbin	Liberal
County Armagh	2	County	Ireland	Armagh	Viscount Acheson	Liberal
County Armagh	2	County	Ireland	Armagh	William Verner	Tory
Arundel	1	Borough	England	Sussex	Lord Dudley Stuart	Liberal
Ashburton	1	Borough	England	Devon	William Stephen Poyntz	Liberal
Ashton-under-Lyne	1	Borough	England	Lancashire	George Williams	Liberal
Athlone	1	Borough	Ireland	Westmeath & Roscommon	James Talbot	Liberal
Aylesbury	2	Borough	England	Buckinghamshire	Henry Hanmer	Tory
Aylesbury	2	Borough	England	Buckinghamshire	William Rickford	Liberal
Ayr Burghs	1	District	Scotland	Ayrshire	Thomas Francis Kennedy	Liberal
Ayrshire	1	County	Scotland	Ayrshire	Richard Oswald	Liberal
Banbury	1	Borough	England	Oxfordshire	Henry William Tancred	Liberal
Bandon	1	Borough	Ireland	Cork	William Smyth Bernard	Tory
Banffshire	1	County	Scotland	Banffshire	George Ferguson	Tory
Barnstaple	2	Borough	England	Devon	John Chichester	Liberal
Barnstaple	2	Borough	England	Devon	Charles St John Fancourt	Tory
Bath	2	Borough	England	Somerset	John Arthur Roebuck	Liberal
Bath	2	Borough	England	Somerset	Charles Palmer	Liberal
Beaumaris	1	District	Wales	Anglesey	Frederick Paget	Liberal
Bedford	2	Borough	England	Bedfordshire	Samuel Crawley	Liberal
Bedford	2	Borough	England	Bedfordshire	William Henry Whitbread	Liberal
Bedfordshire	2	County	England	Bedfordshire	Lord Charles Russell	Liberal
Bedfordshire	2	County	England	Bedfordshire	William Stuart	Tory
Belfast	2	Borough	Ireland	Antrim	James Emerson Tennent	Liberal
Belfast	2	Borough	Ireland	Antrim	Lord Arthur Chichester	Liberal
Berkshire	3	County	England	Berkshire	Robert Throckmorton	Liberal
Berkshire	3	County	England	Berkshire	Robert Palmer	Tory
Berkshire	3	County	England	Berkshire	John Walter	Liberal
Berwickshire	1	County	Scotland	Berwickshire	Charles Albany Marjoribanks	Liberal
Berwick-upon-Tweed	2	Borough	England	Northumberland	Sir Rufane Shaw Donkin	Liberal
Berwick-upon-Tweed	2	Borough	England	Northumberland	Sir Francis Blake, Bt	Liberal
Beverley	2	Borough	England	Yorkshire, East	Hon. Charles Langdale	Liberal
Beverley	2	Borough	England	Yorkshire, East	Henry Burton-Peters	Liberal
Bewdley	1	Borough	England	Worcestershire	Sir Thomas Winnington, Bt	Liberal
Birmingham	2	Borough	England	Warwickshire	Thomas Attwood	Liberal
Birmingham	2	Borough	England	Warwickshire	Joshua Scholefield	Liberal
Blackburn	2	Borough	England	Lancashire	William Feilden	Liberal
Blackburn	2	Borough	England	Lancashire	William Turner	Liberal
Bodmin	2	Borough	England	Cornwall	William Peter	Liberal
Bodmin	2	Borough	England	Cornwall	Samuel Thomas Spry	Liberal
Bolton	2	Borough	England	Lancashire	Robert Torrens	Liberal
Bolton	2	Borough	England	Lancashire	William Bolling	Tory
Boston	2	Borough	England	Lincolnshire	John Wilks	Liberal
Boston	2	Borough	England	Lincolnshire	Benjamin Handley	Liberal
Bradford	2	Borough	England	Yorkshire, West	Ellis Cunliffe Lister	Liberal
Bradford	2	Borough	England	Yorkshire, West	John Hardy	Liberal
Brecon	1	Borough	Wales	Breconshire	John Lloyd Vaughan Watkins	Liberal
Breconshire	1	County	Wales	Breconshire	Thomas Wood	Tory
Bridgnorth	2	Borough	England	Shropshire	Robert Pigot	Tory
Bridgnorth	2	Borough	England	Shropshire	Thomas Charlton Whitmore	Tory
Bridgwater	2	Borough	England	Somerset	William Tayleur	Liberal
Bridgwater	2	Borough	England	Somerset	Charles Kemeys Tynte	Liberal
Bridport	2	Borough	England	Dorset	Henry Warburton	Liberal
Bridport	2	Borough	England	Dorset	John Romilly	Liberal
Brighton	2	Borough	England	Sussex	Isaac Newton Wigney	Liberal
Brighton	2	Borough	England	Sussex	George Faithfull	Liberal
Bristol	2	Borough	England	Gloucestershire/Somerset	Sir Richard Vyvyan, Bt	Tory
Bristol	2	Borough	England	Gloucestershire/Somerset	James Evan Baillie	Liberal
Buckingham	2	Borough	England	Buckinghamshire	Sir Harry Verney, Bt	Liberal
Buckingham	2	Borough	England	Buckinghamshire	Sir Thomas Fremantle, Bt	Tory
Buckinghamshire	3	County	England	Buckinghamshire	Marquess of Chandos	Tory
Buckinghamshire	3	County	England	Buckinghamshire	John Smith	Liberal
Buckinghamshire	3	County	England	Buckinghamshire	Sir George Dashwood, Bt	Liberal
Bury	1	Borough	England	Lancashire	Richard Walker	Liberal
Bury St Edmunds	2	Borough	England	Suffolk	Lord Charles FitzRoy	Liberal
Bury St Edmunds	2	Borough	England	Suffolk	Earl Jermyn	Tory
Buteshire	1	County	Scotland	Buteshire	Charles Stuart	Tory
