= Richard Sullivan (MP) =

Irish politician

Richard Sullivan was an Irish politician.

Sullivan lived at Castlebamford in County Kilkenny. At the 1832 UK general election, he stood for County Kilkenny. He won the seat as an Irish Repeal candidate, and in Parliament, he argued for the abolition of tithes. He stood down in 1836 by accepting the Chiltern Hundreds.
