= Sampson Stawell =

Sampson Stawell (6 October 1785 – 21 August 1849) was an Irish soldier and politician.

Stawell was born into an upper-class family; he was the nephew of the Earl of Bandon. He joined the British Army, and became a lieutenant-colonel in the 12th Lancers, serving at the Battle of Waterloo.

At the 1832 UK general election, Stawell stood in Kinsale as a Whig, winning the seat with a majority of just six votes. He stood down at the 1835 UK general election.

Parliament of the United Kingdom
Preceded by John Russell	Member of Parliament for Kinsale; 1832–1835	Succeeded by Henry Thomas
