= Repeal Association =

- Leader: Daniel O'Connell
- Founded: 1840
- Dissolved: 1848
- Preceded by: Catholic Association
- Ideology: Irish nationalism Irish autonomy National liberalism Catholic emancipation
- Political position: Centre-left

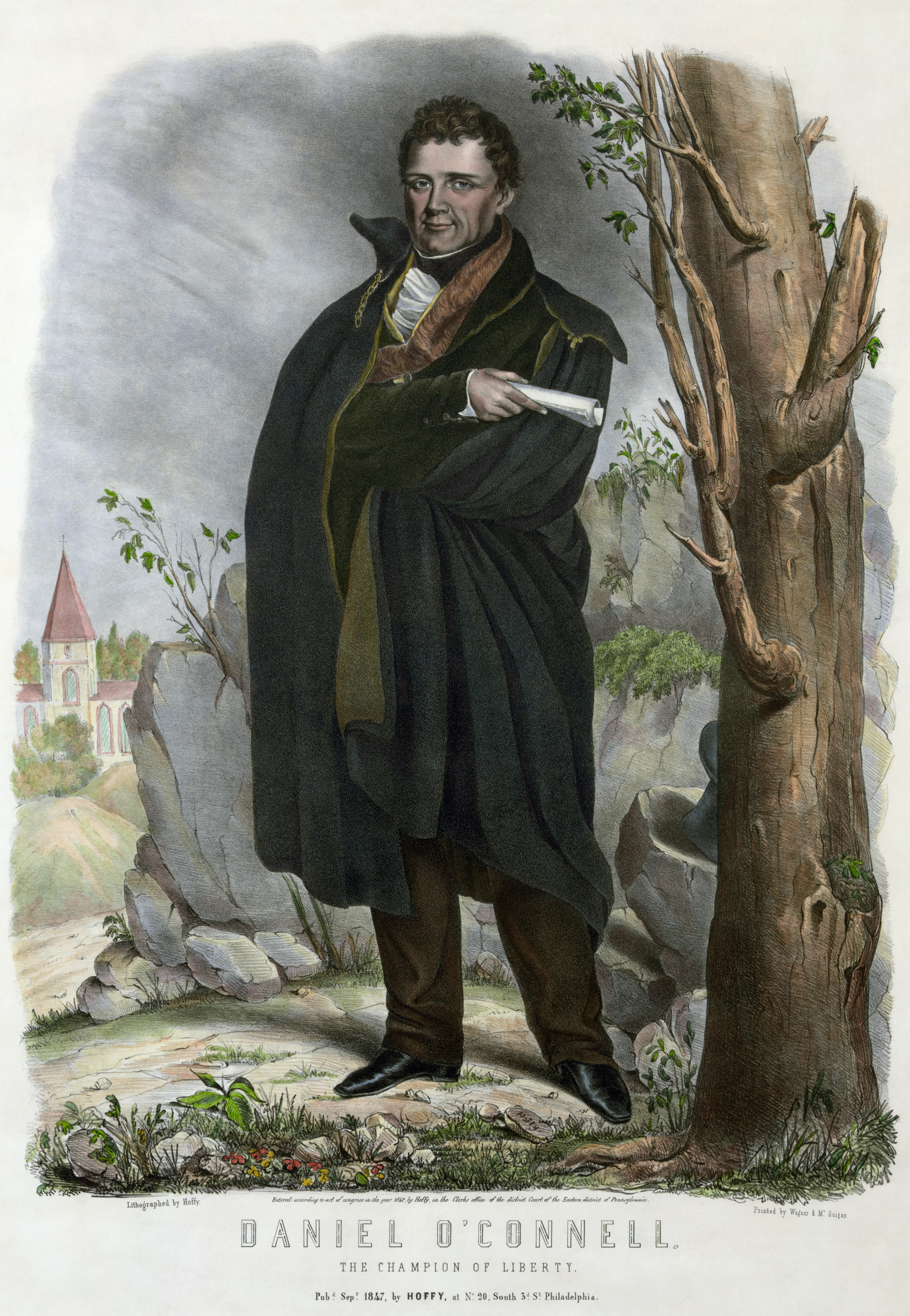
"Daniel O'Connell: The Champion of Liberty" poster published in Pennsylvania, 1847.

The Loyal National Repeal Association (commonly referred to as the Repeal Association) was an Irish political party formed by Daniel O'Connell in 1840 to campaign for the repeal of the Acts of Union of 1800 between Great Britain and Ireland.

The Association sought to restore the Irish Parliament and achieve the level of legislative independence briefly attained in the 1780s under Henry Grattan and his patriots, with the addition of Catholic emancipation, made possible by the Roman Catholic Relief Act 1829, and the expanded franchise of the Representation of the People (Ireland) Act 1832, in addition to responsible government, making Ireland a separate kingdom in a personal union with Great Britain on equal footing. It advocated a peaceful and constitutional path to repeal while maintaining loyalty to the British Crown.

Although O'Connell began calling for repeal in the early 1830s, the formal Association was only established in 1840. Prior to this, candidates supporting repeal contested the 1832 United Kingdom general election and between 1835 and 1841, formed an electoral pact with the Whigs. Repealer candidates, unaffiliated with the Whigs also contested the 1841 and 1847 general elections.

Following the movement's decline in the late 1840s, nationalists, including members of the Young Ireland movement, emerged from its ranks.

== Electoral statistics ==
The seats figure in brackets is the position after election petitions and by-elections consequent upon election petitions, had been decided. There were 105 Irish MPs in the period.

Votes in 1835 and 1837 are included in the Liberal totals in Rallings and Thrasher's tables.

Sources: Walker and Rallings & Thrasher.

Election	Candidates	Unopposed	Votes	% Irish votes	MPs
1832	51	14	31,773	34.6	42 (39)
1835	43	12	...	...	34 (32)
1837	34	15	...	...	30 (31)
1841	22	12	12,537	24.8	20 (18)
1847	51	18	14,128	43.6	36 (35)

== See also ==
- History of Ireland (1801–1923)
- Catholic Association
- Young Ireland
