= List of MPs elected in the 1832 United Kingdom general election (Constituencies S–T) =

Constituency	Seats	Type	Country	County	Member	Party
St Albans	2	Borough	England	Hertfordshire	Sir Francis Vincent, Bt	Liberal
St Albans	2	Borough	England	Hertfordshire	Henry George Ward	Liberal
St Andrews Burghs	1	District	Scotland	Fife	Andrew Johnston	Liberal
St Ives	1	Borough	England	Cornwall	James Halse	Tory
Salford	1	Borough	England	Lancashire	Joseph Brotherton	Liberal
Salisbury	2	Borough	England	Wiltshire	William Bird Brodie	Liberal
Salisbury	2	Borough	England	Wiltshire	Wadham Wyndham	Tory
Sandwich	2	Borough	England	Kent	Joseph Marryat	Liberal
Sandwich	2	Borough	England	Kent	Sir Edward Troubridge, Bt	Liberal
Scarborough	2	Borough	England	Yorkshire, East	Sir John Vanden-Bempde-Johnstone, Bt	Liberal
Scarborough	2	Borough	England	Yorkshire, East	Sir George Cayley, Bt	Liberal
Selkirkshire	1	County	Scotland	Selkirkshire	Robert Pringle	Liberal
Shaftesbury	1	Borough	England	Dorset	John Sayer Poulter	Liberal
Sheffield	2	Borough	England	Yorkshire, West	John Parker	Liberal
Sheffield	2	Borough	England	Yorkshire, West	James Silk Buckingham	Liberal
Shrewsbury	2	Borough	England	Shropshire	Sir John Hanmer, Bt	Tory
Shrewsbury	2	Borough	England	Shropshire	Robert Aglionby Slaney	Liberal
Shropshire Northern	2	County	England	Shropshire	Sir Rowland Hill, Bt	Tory
Shropshire Northern	2	County	England	Shropshire	John Cotes	Liberal
Shropshire Southern	2	County	England	Shropshire	Earl of Darlington	Tory
Shropshire Southern	2	County	England	Shropshire	Hon. Robert Clive	Tory
Sligo	1	Borough	Ireland	Sligo	John Martin	Liberal
County Sligo	2	County	Ireland	Sligo	Edward Joshua Cooper	Tory
County Sligo	2	County	Ireland	Sligo	Alexander Perceval	Tory
Somerset Eastern	2	County	England	Somerset	William Gore-Langton	Liberal
Somerset Eastern	2	County	England	Somerset	William Papwell Brigstocke	Liberal
Somerset Western	2	County	England	Somerset	Edward Ayshford Sanford	Liberal
Somerset Western	2	County	England	Somerset	Charles Kemeys-Tynte	Liberal
Southampton	2	Borough	England	Hampshire	Arthur Atherley	Liberal
Southampton	2	Borough	England	Hampshire	James Barlow-Hoy	Tory
South Shields	1	Borough	England	Durham	Robert Ingham	Liberal
Southwark	2	Borough	England	Surrey	John Humphery	Liberal
Southwark	2	Borough	England	Surrey	William Brougham	Liberal
Stafford	2	Borough	England	Staffordshire	William Fawkener Chetwynd	Liberal
Stafford	2	Borough	England	Staffordshire	Rees Howell Gronow	Liberal
Staffordshire Northern	2	County	England	Staffordshire	Sir Oswald Mosley, Bt	Liberal
Staffordshire Northern	2	County	England	Staffordshire	Edward Buller	Liberal
Staffordshire Southern	2	County	England	Staffordshire	Edward John Littleton	Liberal
Staffordshire Southern	2	County	England	Staffordshire	Sir John Wrottesley, Bt	Liberal
Stamford	2	Borough	England	Lincolnshire	Thomas Chaplin	Tory
Stamford	2	Borough	England	Lincolnshire	George Finch	Tory
Stirling Burghs	1	District	Scotland	Stirlingshire	Lord Dalmeny	Liberal
Stirlingshire	1	County	Scotland	Stirlingshire	Charles Elphinstone Fleeming	Liberal
Stockport	2	Borough	England	Cheshire	Thomas Marsland	Tory
Stockport	2	Borough	England	Cheshire	John Horatio Lloyd	Liberal
Stoke-upon-Trent	2	Borough	England	Staffordshire	Josiah Wedgwood III	Liberal
Stoke-upon-Trent	2	Borough	England	Staffordshire	John Davenport	Tory
Stroud	2	Borough	England	Gloucestershire	William Henry Hyett	Liberal
Stroud	2	Borough	England	Gloucestershire	David Ricardo	Liberal
Sudbury	2	Borough	England	Suffolk	Michael Angelo Taylor	Liberal
Sudbury	2	Borough	England	Suffolk	Sir John Benn Walsh, Bt	Tory
Suffolk Eastern	2	County	England	Suffolk	The Lord Henniker	Tory
Suffolk Eastern	2	County	England	Suffolk	Robert Newton Shawe	Liberal
Suffolk Western	2	County	England	Suffolk	Charles Tyrell	Liberal
Suffolk Western	2	County	England	Suffolk	Sir Hyde Parker, Bt	Liberal
Sunderland	2	Borough	England	Durham	Sir William Chaytor, Bt	Liberal
Sunderland	2	Borough	England	Durham	George Barrington	Liberal
Surrey Eastern	2	County	England	Surrey	John Ivatt Briscoe	Liberal
Surrey Eastern	2	County	England	Surrey	Aubrey Beauclerk	Liberal
Surrey Western	2	County	England	Surrey	William Denison	Liberal
Surrey Western	2	County	England	Surrey	John Leach	Liberal
Sussex Eastern	2	County	England	Sussex	Hon. Charles Cavendish	Liberal
Sussex Eastern	2	County	England	Sussex	Herbert Barrett Curteis	Liberal
Sussex Western	2	County	England	Sussex	Lord John Lennox	Liberal
Sussex Western	2	County	England	Sussex	Earl of Surrey	Liberal
Sutherland	1	County	Scotland	Sutherland	Roderick Macleod	Liberal
Swansea District	1	District	Wales	Glamorganshire	John Henry Vivian	Liberal
Tamworth	2	Borough	England	Staffordshire/Warwickshire	Sir Robert Peel	Tory
Tamworth	2	Borough	England	Staffordshire/Warwickshire	Lord Charles Townshend	Liberal
Taunton	2	Borough	England	Somerset	Henry Labouchere	Liberal
Taunton	2	Borough	England	Somerset	Edward Thomas Bainbridge	Liberal
Tavistock	2	Borough	England	Devon	Charles Richard Fox	Liberal
Tavistock	2	Borough	England	Devon	Lord Russell	Liberal
Tewkesbury	2	Borough	England	Gloucestershire	Charles Hanbury-Tracy	Liberal
Tewkesbury	2	Borough	England	Gloucestershire	John Martin	Liberal
Thetford	2	Borough	England	Norfolk	Francis Baring	Tory
Thetford	2	Borough	England	Norfolk	Lord James FitzRoy	Liberal
Thirsk	1	Borough	England	Yorkshire, North	Sir Robert Frankland, Bt	Liberal
Tipperary	2	County	Ireland	Tipperary	Hon. Cornelius O'Callaghan	Liberal
Tipperary	2	County	Ireland	Tipperary	Richard Lalor Sheil	Repeal
Tiverton	2	Borough	England	Devon	John Heathcoat	Liberal
Tiverton	2	Borough	England	Devon	James Kennedy	Liberal
Totnes	2	Borough	England	Devon	Jasper Parrott	Liberal
Totnes	2	Borough	England	Devon	James Cornish	Liberal
Tower Hamlets	2	Borough	England	Middlesex	Stephen Lushington	Liberal
Tower Hamlets	2	Borough	England	Middlesex	William Clay	Liberal
Tralee	1	Borough	Ireland	Kerry	Maurice O'Connell	Repeal
Truro	2	Borough	England	Cornwall	Sir Hussey Vivian, Bt	Liberal
Truro	2	Borough	England	Cornwall	William Tooke	Liberal
Tynemouth and North Shields	1	Borough	England	Northumberland	George Frederick Young	Liberal
Tyrone	2	County	Ireland	Tyrone	Henry Thomas Lowry-Corry	Tory
Tyrone	2	County	Ireland	Tyrone	Sir Hugh Stewart, Bt	Tory
