= Lee Steere (MP) =

Lee Steere MP

Member of Parliament for West Surrey
- In office 8 September 1870 – 3 April 1880 Serving with George Cubitt
- Preceded by: George Cubitt; John Ivatt Briscoe
- Succeeded by: George Cubitt; St John Brodrick

Personal details
- Born: 21 June 1803 St Marylebone, Middlesex
- Died: 9 October 1890 (aged 87) Jayes Park, Ockley, Surrey
- Party: Conservative
- Spouse: Anne Watson (m. 1826)
- Children: Eight
- Parent(s): Lee Steere Steere; Sarah

Lee Steere (21 June 1803 – 1890) was a British Conservative Party politician.

Heath was co-elected MP for West Surrey at a by-election in 1870; he held one of the two seats serving that area until 1880 when he did not stand for re-election.

During his life, Steere was also a Justice of the Peace, Deputy Lieutenant of Surrey and High Sheriff of Surrey.

Steere married Anne Watson, daughter of J K Watson, in 1826 and together they had five sons, one of whom was Australian politician James George Lee Steere.

He died on 9 October 1890 at his main home Jayes (Jayes Park) in the parish of Wotton, his probate was sworn that year with personal, vested assets of £18,087 (equivalent to about £2,000,000 in 2025) expressly in Britain which denotes he had foreign assets.

Parliament of the United Kingdom
Preceded by George Cubitt; John Ivatt Briscoe	Member of Parliament for West Surrey; 1870–1880; With: George Cubitt	Succeeded by George Cubitt; St John Brodrick
