= Sir Charles Darling =

Sir Charles Darling has been the title of multiple members of the British peerage:

- Charles Henry Darling (1809-1870), British colonial governor
- Charles Darling, 1st Baron Darling (1849-1936), lawyer, politician, and Justice of the High Court
