= West Surrey (constituency) =

Parliamentary constituency in the United Kingdom, 1832–1885

- Former county constituency for the House of Commons
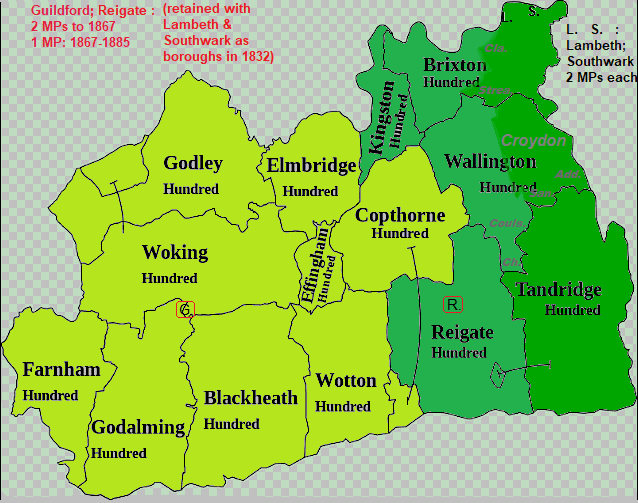
- This two-member area shaded yellow
- County: Surrey

1832–1885
- Seats: Two
- Created from: Haslemere and Surrey
- Replaced by: Epsom; Chertsey; Guildford; Reigate also called Mid, N.W. S.W. and S.E. Surrey
- During its existence contributed to new seat(s) of: Mid Surrey (1868-1885 form)

West Surrey (formally the Western division of Surrey) was a parliamentary constituency in the county of Surrey, which returned two Members of Parliament (MPs) to the House of Commons of the Parliament of the United Kingdom, elected by the bloc vote system.

It was created under the Great Reform Act for the 1832 general election, and abolished for the 1885 general election.

== Boundaries ==
1832–1885: The Hundreds of Blackheath, Copthorne, Effingham, Elmbridge, Farnham, Godalming, Godley and Chertsey, Woking and Wotton.

The constituency was therefore the more extensive and more rural of the two divisions of Surrey established in 1832. Its main existing towns were urbanising with railway stations built; Woking became a town towards the end of its existence. Elections were conducted at Guildford; other most populous towns were Leatherhead, Dorking, Epsom, Ewell, Farnham, Godalming, Haslemere, Chertsey, Egham, Walton-on-Thames, Weybridge and Woking. Guildford was a parliamentary borough represented in its own right, but those of its freeholders not qualifying for a vote as such could vote for the county division MPs.

=== Subdivision in 1885 ===
On its abolition in 1885 its contents made up all or some of four single-member seats and the overlapping seat (1295-1867 a constituency returning two members), Guildford parliamentary borough, was abolished. The outcome was as follows:

- The North-Western division of Surrey or Chertsey (i.e. Bisley; Byfleet; Chertsey; Chobham; Egham; Horsell; Pyrford; Thorpe; Weybridge; Windlesham; Ash, East Clandon, West Clandon, East Horsley, West Horsley, Merrow, Ockham, Pirbright, Send and Ripley, Wanborough, Windlesham, Wisley, Woking and Worplesdon.)
- Epsom (UK Parliament constituency) drew on Mid Surrey as to Tolworth, New Malden, Malden, Worcester Park, Surbiton, Hook, Coombe and Long Ditton in the Kingston Hundred and Sessional Division. Took: Ashtead; Banstead; Great Bookham; Little Bookham; Cheam; Chessington; Cuddington; Epsom; Ewell; Fetcham; Headley; Leatherhead; Sutton; Walton on the Hill; Cobham; Thames Ditton; Esher; East Molesey; West Molesey; Stoke D'Abernon; and Walton on Thames.
- Reigate (UK Parliament constituency) drew, approximately equally, on the three abolished two-member divisions of Surrey, so taking from West Surrey, the traditional unit of land: Wotton Hundred.
- The South-Western division of Surrey or Guildford as to the rest

== Members of Parliament ==
Election	1st Member	1st Party	Main home	2nd Member	2nd Party	Main home
1832	William Joseph Denison	Whig	Denbies, Dorking	John Leach	Whig	Lea, Witley, Surrey
1835	William Joseph Denison	Whig	Denbies, Dorking	Charles Barclay	Conservative	Bury Hill, Dorking
1837	William Joseph Denison	Whig	Denbies, Dorking	Hon. George Perceval	Conservative	Nork House, Banstead and Cowdray Park, Midhurst and 26 St James's Place, St James's
1840 by-election	William Joseph Denison	Whig	Denbies, Dorking	John Trotter	Conservative	Horton Place (manor), Epsom
1847	William Joseph Denison	Whig	Denbies, Dorking	Henry Drummond	Conservative	Albury Park, Albury
1849 by-election	William John Evelyn	Conservative	Wotton House, Wotton (west of Dorking)	Henry Drummond	Conservative	Albury Park, Albury
1857	John Ivatt Briscoe	Whig	Botleys, Chertsey then Foxhills, Chertsey	Henry Drummond	Conservative	Albury Park, Albury
1859	John Ivatt Briscoe	Liberal	Botleys, Chertsey then Foxhills, Chertsey	Henry Drummond	Conservative	Albury Park, Albury
1860 by-election	John Ivatt Briscoe	Liberal	Botleys, Chertsey then Foxhills, Chertsey	George Cubitt	Conservative	Denbies, Dorking
1870 by-election	Lee Steere	Conservative	Jayes (Jayes Park), Wotton	George Cubitt	Conservative	Denbies, Dorking
1880	Hon. St John Brodrick	Conservative	Peper Harow House, Peper Harow, near Godalming	George Cubitt	Conservative	Denbies, Dorking
1885	constituency abolished					

The Times obituary of Leech reads:

On the 16th, inst[ant (this month)], died, at the age of 86, after a short illness, John Leech, Esq. He lived and died at his paternal mansion at Lea, in the county of Surrey. He was elected member for the western division of that county in the year 1832. Mr Leech was the very type of an old English country gentleman: benevolent, active, intelligent, upright, honourable, and of a truly independent and manly mind. His memory will be long cherished by his friends, and his death deplored by a wide circle of intimate acquaintance.

— The Times

== Election results ==
=== Elections in the 1830s ===
General election 1832: West Surrey
Party	Candidate	Votes	%
Whig	William Joseph Denison	1,517	36.6
Whig	John Leach	1,427	34.5
Tory	George Holme Sumner	1,198	28.9
Majority		229	5.6
Turnout		2,527	86.8
Registered electors		2,912	
Whig win (new seat)			
Whig win (new seat)			

General election 1835: West Surrey
Party	Candidate	Votes	%	±%
Whig	William Joseph Denison	1,488	36.5	−0.1
Conservative	Charles Barclay (Surrey MP)	1,316	32.2	+3.3
Whig	Henry Lawes Long	1,285	31.4	−3.1
Turnout		2,550	85.9	−0.9
Registered electors		2,967		
Majority		172	4.2	−1.4
Whig hold		Swing	−0.9	
Majority		31	0.8	N/A
Conservative gain from Whig		Swing	+3.3	

General election 1837: West Surrey
Party	Candidate	Votes	%	±%
Whig	William Joseph Denison	1,586	33.7	−2.8
Conservative	George Perceval	1,578	33.5	+1.3
Whig	Henry Lawes Long	1,543	32.8	+1.4
Turnout		2,970	80.5	−5.4
Registered electors		3,688		
Majority		8	0.2	−4.0
Whig hold		Swing	−1.7	
Majority		35	0.7	−0.1
Conservative hold		Swing	+1.4	

=== Elections in the 1840s ===
Perceval (of the with-heirs-male inheritee branch of the Earls of Egmont) was in 1802 given his peerage becoming Lord Arden which caused a by-election.

By-election, 31 July 1840: West Surrey
Party	Candidate	Votes	%	±%
Conservative	John Trotter	Unopposed		
Conservative hold				

General election 1841: West Surrey
Party	Candidate	Votes	%	±%
Whig	William Joseph Denison	Unopposed		
Conservative	John Trotter	Unopposed		
Registered electors		3,993		
Whig hold				
Conservative hold				

General election 1847: West Surrey
Party	Candidate	Votes	%	±%
Whig	William Joseph Denison	Unopposed		
Conservative	Henry Drummond	Unopposed		
Registered electors		3,778		
Whig hold				
Conservative hold				

Denison's death caused a by-election.

By-election, 27 September 1849: West Surrey
Party	Candidate	Votes	%	±%
Conservative	William John Evelyn	1,144	53.7	N/A
Whig	Richard Wyatt Edgell (Note: later of Strawberry Hill, Lympstone, Devon died, 79, in 1875.)	988	46.3	N/A
Majority		156	7.4	N/A
Turnout		2,132	58.4	N/A
Registered electors		3,651		
Conservative gain from Whig		Swing	N/A	

=== Elections in the 1850s ===
General election 1852: West Surrey
Party	Candidate	Votes	%	±%
Conservative	William John Evelyn	1,646	35.5	N/A
Conservative	Henry Drummond	1,610	34.7	N/A
Whig	Thomas-Chaloner Bisse-Challoner	1,385	29.8	N/A
Majority		225	4.9	N/A
Turnout		3,013 (est)	77.3 (est)	N/A
Registered electors		4,081		
Conservative hold		Swing	N/A	
Conservative gain from Whig		Swing	N/A	

General election 1857: West Surrey
Party	Candidate	Votes	%	±%
Whig	John Ivatt Briscoe	1,439	35.7	+5.9
Conservative	Henry Drummond	1,386	34.4	−0.3
Conservative	Henry Currie (Note: of West Horsley Place, died 74, in 1873)	1,204	29.9	−5.6
Majority		53	1.3	N/A
Turnout		2,734 (est)	69.7 (est)	−7.6
Registered electors		3,920		
Whig gain from Conservative		Swing	+5.9	
Conservative hold		Swing	−1.6	

General election 1859: West Surrey
Party	Candidate	Votes	%	±%
Liberal	John Ivatt Briscoe	Unopposed		
Conservative	Henry Drummond	Unopposed		
Registered electors		3,958		
Liberal hold				
Conservative hold				

=== Elections in the 1860s ===
Drummond's death caused a by-election.

By-election, 10 March 1860: West Surrey
Party	Candidate	Votes	%	±%
Conservative	George Cubitt	Unopposed		
Conservative hold				

General election 1865: West Surrey
Party	Candidate	Votes	%	±%
Liberal	John Ivatt Briscoe	Unopposed		
Conservative	George Cubitt	Unopposed		
Registered electors		4,081		
Liberal hold				
Conservative hold				

General election 1868: West Surrey
Party	Candidate	Votes	%	±%
Conservative	George Cubitt	3,000	39.6	N/A
Liberal	John Ivatt Briscoe	2,826	37.3	N/A
Liberal	Frederick Pennington (Note: Soon after, MP for Stockport until standing down for a seat lost by 12 votes, in 1885; the notable international merchant, socialite and speaker lived at Broome Hall, Holmwood in the county when not in town)	1,757	23.2	N/A
Majority		174	2.3	N/A
Turnout		5,292 (est)	78.9 (est)	N/A
Registered electors		6,708		
Liberal hold				
Conservative hold				

=== Elections in the 1870s ===
Briscoe's death caused a by-election.

By-election, 8 Sep 1870: West Surrey
Party	Candidate	Votes	%	±%
Conservative	Lee Steere	Unopposed		
Conservative gain from Liberal				

General election 1874: West Surrey
Party	Candidate	Votes	%	±%
Conservative	Lee Steere	Unopposed		
Conservative	George Cubitt	Unopposed		
Registered electors		7,314		
Conservative hold				
Conservative gain from Liberal				

=== Elections in the 1880s ===
General election 1880: West Surrey
Party	Candidate	Votes	%	±%
Conservative	John Brodrick	Unopposed		
Conservative	George Cubitt	Unopposed		
Registered electors		7,779		
Conservative hold				
Conservative hold				
