= Joan Ruddock =

British Labour Party politician (born 1943)

The Right Honourable Dame Joan Ruddock DBE
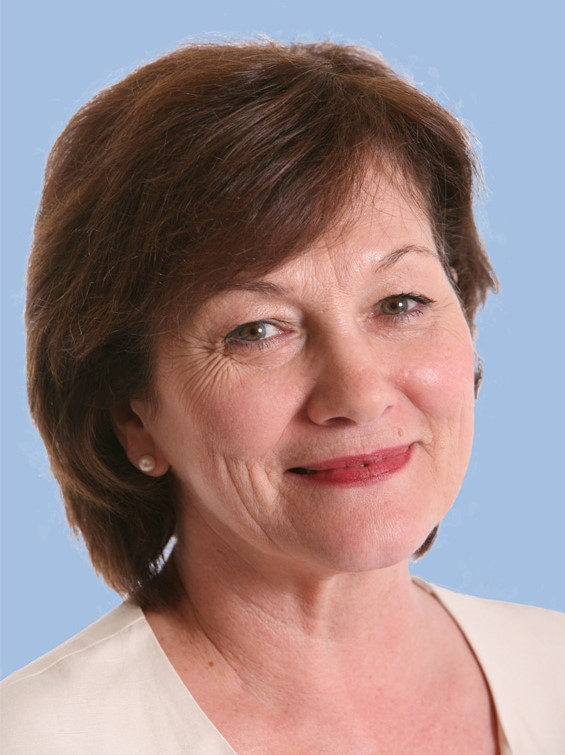
- Official portrait, 2007

Minister of State for Energy and Climate Change
- In office 8 June 2009 – 11 May 2010
- Prime Minister: Gordon Brown
- Preceded by: Mike O'Brien
- Succeeded by: Charles Hendry

Parliamentary Under-Secretary of State for Energy and Climate Change
- In office 5 October 2008 – 8 June 2009
- Prime Minister: Gordon Brown
- Preceded by: Position established
- Succeeded by: David Kidney

Parliamentary Under-Secretary of State for Climate Change, Biodiversity & Waste
- In office 2 July 2007 – 5 October 2008
- Prime Minister: Gordon Brown
- Preceded by: Position established
- Succeeded by: Dan Norris

Member of Parliament for Lewisham Deptford
- In office 11 June 1987 – 30 March 2015
- Preceded by: John Silkin
- Succeeded by: Vicky Foxcroft

Personal details
- Born: Joan Mary Anthony; 28 December 1943 (age 82) Pontypool, Monmouthshire, Wales
- Party: Labour
- Spouse(s): Keith Ruddock (1963–1996; his death); Frank Doran (2010–2017; his death)
- Education: Imperial College London
- Website: Official website

Dame Joan Mary Ruddock (née Anthony; born 28 December 1943) is a British Labour Party politician who served as the Member of Parliament (MP) for Lewisham Deptford from 1987 to 2015. Ruddock was Minister of State for Energy at the Department of Energy and Climate Change until 11 May 2010. She stood down at the 2015 general election.

== Early life ==
Ruddock was educated at Pontypool Girls' Grammar School and at Imperial College London where she studied Botany and Chemistry. Prior to her election to Parliament, she was chair of the Campaign for Nuclear Disarmament, a UK pressure group; she resigned in 1985.

== Parliamentary career ==
Ruddock fought the safe Conservative seat of Newbury in 1979, coming third. She was elected for Lewisham Deptford in 1987, succeeding John Silkin, who had died suddenly before the general election was called. She was initially a member of the Campaign Group but resigned in 1988 in protest at Tony Benn's decision to challenge Neil Kinnock for the leadership.

During the government of Tony Blair, she briefly served as Minister for Women. She returned to government when Gordon Brown appointed her Parliamentary Under-Secretary of State at the Department for Environment, Food and Rural Affairs in June 2007 with responsibility for biodiversity, climate change adaptation, waste and domestic forestry. In October 2008 she was transferred to the newly created Department of Energy and Climate Change, continuing in her previous role. In the June 2009 reshuffle she was promoted to Minister of State level, with responsibility for energy policy, which she held until the fall of the Labour Government in 2010.

During her time in Parliament Ruddock was responsible for successfully introducing two private members bills on fly tipping and ensuring local authorities provided doorstep recycling.

She is an Honorary Fellow of Goldsmiths, University of London, an Honorary Fellow of Laban London and a member of the Board of Trinity Laban.

She was appointed as a Privy Counsellor on 9 June 2010. She was appointed a Dame Commander of the Order of the British Empire (DBE) in the 2012 New Year Honours for public and political services.

== Personal life ==
Ruddock's first husband was Keith Harrhy Ruddock, Professor of Biophysics at Imperial College London, whom she married in 1963. He died in a traffic accident in 1996; the couple had separated in 1990. Her second marriage was to the former Labour MP for Aberdeen North, Frank Doran, from 2010 until his death in 2017.

Political offices
Preceded by Hugh Jenkins	Chair of CND; 1981–1985	Succeeded by Paul Johns
Parliament of the United Kingdom
Preceded by John Silkin	Member of Parliament for Lewisham Deptford; 1987–2015	Succeeded by Vicky Foxcroft
