= Jack Cooper, Baron Cooper of Stockton Heath =

British Labour Party politician and trade union leader

John Cooper, Baron Cooper of Stockton Heath (7 June 1908 – 2 September 1988) was a British Labour Party politician and trade union leader.

He was mentored by his Uncle, Charles Dukes (Charles Dukes, 1st Baron Dukeston) the drafter of the United Nations Human Rights Act for the United Kingdom.

At the 1950 general election, he was elected as Member of Parliament for Deptford, but stood down from the House of Commons at the 1951 general election.

From 1961 to 1973 he was general secretary of the National Union of General and Municipal Workers.

On 11 July 1966, he was made a life peer as Baron Cooper of Stockton Heath, of Stockton Heath in the County Palatine of Chester.

Parliament of the United Kingdom
Preceded by John Wilmot	Member of Parliament for Deptford; 1950–1951	Succeeded by Sir Leslie Plummer
Trade union offices
Preceded by Tom Cochrane	Southern District Secretary of the National Union of General and Municipal Workers; 1944–1962	Succeeded by Fred Walker
Preceded by William E. Hopkin	Chairman of the National Union of General and Municipal Workers; 1952–1962	Succeeded by Bernard Swindell
Preceded by Tom Williamson	General Secretary of the National Union of General and Municipal Workers; 1962–1973	Succeeded by David Basnett
Preceded by William Carron and George Lowthian	Trades Union Congress representative to the AFL-CIO; 1967; With: Harry Nicholas	Succeeded by Sidney Greene and George Smith
Preceded by Sidney Greene	President of the Trades Union Congress; 1971	Succeeded by George Smith
