= John Silkin =

British left-wing Labour politician and solicitor (1923-1987)

The Right Honourable John Silkin
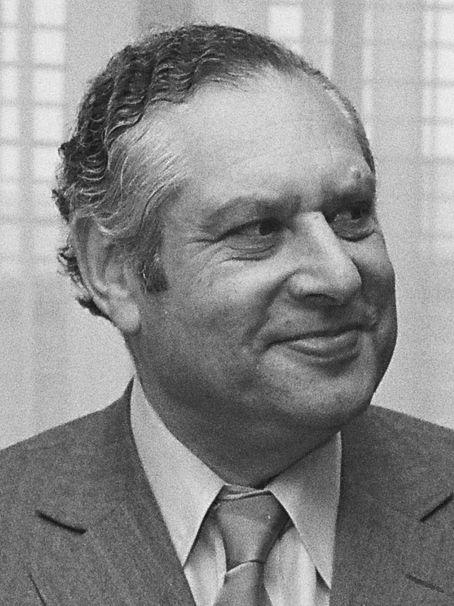
- Silkin in 1979

Shadow Secretary of State for Defence
- In office 24 November 1981 – 26 October 1984
- Leader: Michael Foot; Neil Kinnock
- Preceded by: Brynmor John
- Succeeded by: Denzil Davies

Shadow Leader of the House of Commons
- In office 8 December 1980 – 30 October 1983
- Leader: Michael Foot
- Preceded by: Michael Foot
- Succeeded by: Peter Shore

Shadow Secretary of State for Industry
- In office 14 July 1979 – 8 December 1980
- Leader: Jim Callaghan
- Preceded by: Eric Varley
- Succeeded by: Stanley Orme

Minister of Agriculture, Fisheries and Food
- In office 10 September 1976 – 4 May 1979
- Prime Minister: Jim Callaghan
- Preceded by: Fred Peart
- Succeeded by: Peter Walker

Minister of State for Local Government and Planning
- In office 7 March 1974 – 10 September 1976
- Prime Minister: Harold Wilson; Jim Callaghan
- Preceded by: Graham Page (Local Government and Development)
- Succeeded by: Position abolished

Shadow Secretary of State for Health and Social Services
- In office 24 March 1972 – 5 March 1974
- Leader: Harold Wilson
- Preceded by: Barbara Castle
- Succeeded by: Keith Joseph

Minister of Public Buildings and Works
- In office 30 April 1969 – 19 June 1970
- Prime Minister: Harold Wilson
- Preceded by: Bob Mellish
- Succeeded by: Julian Amery

Government Chief Whip in the House of Commons Parliamentary Secretary to the Treasury
- In office 4 July 1966 – 30 April 1969
- Prime Minister: Harold Wilson
- Deputy: George Lawson (1966–67); Charles Grey (1967–69)
- Preceded by: Edward Short
- Succeeded by: Bob Mellish

Government Deputy Chief Whip in the House of Commons Treasurer of the Household
- In office 11 April 1966 – 4 July 1966
- Prime Minister: Harold Wilson
- Preceded by: Sydney Irving
- Succeeded by: George Lawson (Deputy); Charles Grey (Treasurer)

Member of Parliament for Lewisham Deptford Deptford (1963–1974)
- In office 4 July 1963 – 26 April 1987
- Preceded by: Leslie Plummer
- Succeeded by: Joan Ruddock

Personal details
- Born: 18 March 1923 London, England
- Died: 26 April 1987 (aged 64) London, England
- Party: Labour
- Spouse: Rosamund John (m. 1950)
- Education: University of Wales; Trinity Hall, Cambridge

John Ernest Silkin (18 March 1923 – 26 April 1987) was a British Labour politician and solicitor.

== Early life ==
Silkin was born in London. He was the third son of Lewis Silkin, 1st Baron Silkin, and a younger brother of Samuel Silkin, Baron Silkin of Dulwich. He was educated at Dulwich College, the University of Wales and Trinity Hall, Cambridge. Silkin served in the Royal Naval Volunteer Reserve from 1942 to 1946. He was commissioned as a sub-lieutenant in 1943, serving in the East Indies Fleet, Eastern Fleet and Pacific Fleet aboard HMS King George V and HMS Formidable, and ashore at Anderson, Ceylon (FECB). He was later promoted lieutenant. He was demobilised in 1946 and returned to Cambridge.

Silkin was admitted as a solicitor in 1950 and worked for his father's law practice in London.

== Parliamentary career ==
He contested the seat of St Marylebone for the Labour Party at the 1950 general election, West Woolwich in 1951 and South Nottingham in 1959. He served as a councillor in the Metropolitan Borough of St Marylebone (1962–1963) and was elected to the House of Commons for the first time in July 1963. He served as the Labour Member of Parliament for Deptford (1963–1974) and for Lewisham, Deptford (1974–1987).

He was appointed to the Privy Council in 1966. He served as a Government Chief Whip (1966–1969) and as the deputy leader of the House of Commons (1968–1969). He was appointed as the Minister of Public Buildings and Works (1969–1970) and the Minister for Planning and Local Government in the Department for the Environment (1974–1976). He served as the Minister of Agriculture, Fisheries and Food (1976–79).

In opposition, Silkin was an unsuccessful candidate in the 1980 Labour leadership election following the resignation of James Callaghan, losing to Michael Foot, and in the deputy leadership election in 1981, losing to incumbent Denis Healey. He served as Opposition Spokesman on Industry (1979–1980), Shadow Leader of the House of Commons (1980–1983), Shadow Defence Secretary (1981–1983) and the Dairy Industry Arbitrator (1986–1987).

Silkin's publication Changing Battlefields: The Challenge to the Labour Party appeared posthumously. His widow gave his papers to the Churchill Archives Centre in February 1990. These cover his parliamentary and ministerial career, as well as his other public interests, such as the Channel Tunnel, the European Economic Community and the dairy industry. There is material of particular interest concerning his relationship with his Constituency Labour Party in Deptford and on the Labour Party's 1980 leadership and 1981 deputy leadership elections.

== Personal life ==
In 1950, Silkin married actress Rosamund John. They had one son.

On 26 April 1987, Silkin died from a heart attack at his home in London. A by-election was not held due to the 1987 general election being called soon after Silkin’s death.

Parliament of the United Kingdom
Preceded by Leslie Plummer	Member of Parliament for Deptford; 1963–1974	Constituency abolished
New constituency	Member of Parliament for Lewisham Deptford; 1974–1987	Succeeded by Joan Ruddock
Political offices
Preceded by Sydney Irving	Deputy Chief Whip of the House of Commons; 1966	Succeeded by George Lawson
Preceded by Sydney Irving	Treasurer of the Household; 1966	Succeeded by Charles Grey
Preceded by Edward Short	Chief Whip of the House of Commons; 1966–1969	Succeeded by Bob Mellish
Preceded by Edward Short	Parliamentary Secretary to the Treasury; 1966–1969	Succeeded by Bob Mellish
Preceded by Bob Mellish	Minister of Public Buildings and Works; 1969–1970	Succeeded by Julian Amery
Preceded by Barbara Castle	Shadow Secretary of State for Health and Social Services; 1972–1974	Succeeded by Keith Joseph
Preceded by Graham Page as Minister of State for Local Government and Development	Minister of State for Local Government and Planning; 1974–1976	Position abolished
Preceded by Fred Peart	Minister of State for Agriculture, Fisheries and Food; 1976–1979	Succeeded by Peter Walker
Preceded by Eric Varley	Shadow Secretary of State for Industry; 1979–1980	Succeeded by Stanley Orme
Preceded by Michael Foot	Shadow Leader of the House of Commons; 1980–1983	Succeeded by Peter Shore
Preceded by Brynmor John	Shadow Secretary of State for Defence; 1981–1984	Succeeded by Denzil Davies
Party political offices
Preceded by Sydney Irving	Labour Deputy Chief Whip in the House of Commons; 1966	Succeeded by George Lawson
Preceded by Edward Short	Labour Chief Whip in the House of Commons; 1966–1969	Succeeded by Bob Mellish
