= 1897 Deptford by-election =

UK Parliamentary by-election

The 1897 Deptford by-election was held on 15 November 1897 following the appointment of the incumbent Conservative MP, Charles Darling as a judge of the Queen's Bench Division of the High Court of Justice.

== Candidates ==
The Conservative Party candidate was Arthur Henry Aylmer Morton. Morton was the London County Council member for Rotherhithe and had contested Manchester North at the previous general election.

The Liberal Party candidate was John Benn. Benn was the London County Council member for Kennington, and had previously served on the council for Finsbury East. He had also served as Member of Parliament for Tower Hamlets, St George from 1892 to his defeat in 1895.

== Result ==
1897 Deptford by-election
Party	Candidate	Votes	%	±%
Conservative	Arthur Henry Aylmer Morton	5,317	51.6	−4.5
Liberal	John Benn	4,993	48.4	+4.5
Majority		324	3.2	−9.0
Turnout		10,310	74.3	+1.3
Registered electors		13,868		
Conservative hold		Swing	−4.5	
