= Henry Drummond (1786–1860) =

English banker, politician and writer

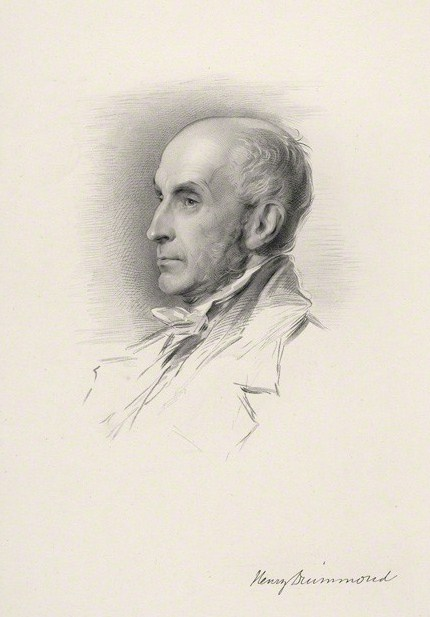
Henry Drummond, 1857 engraving

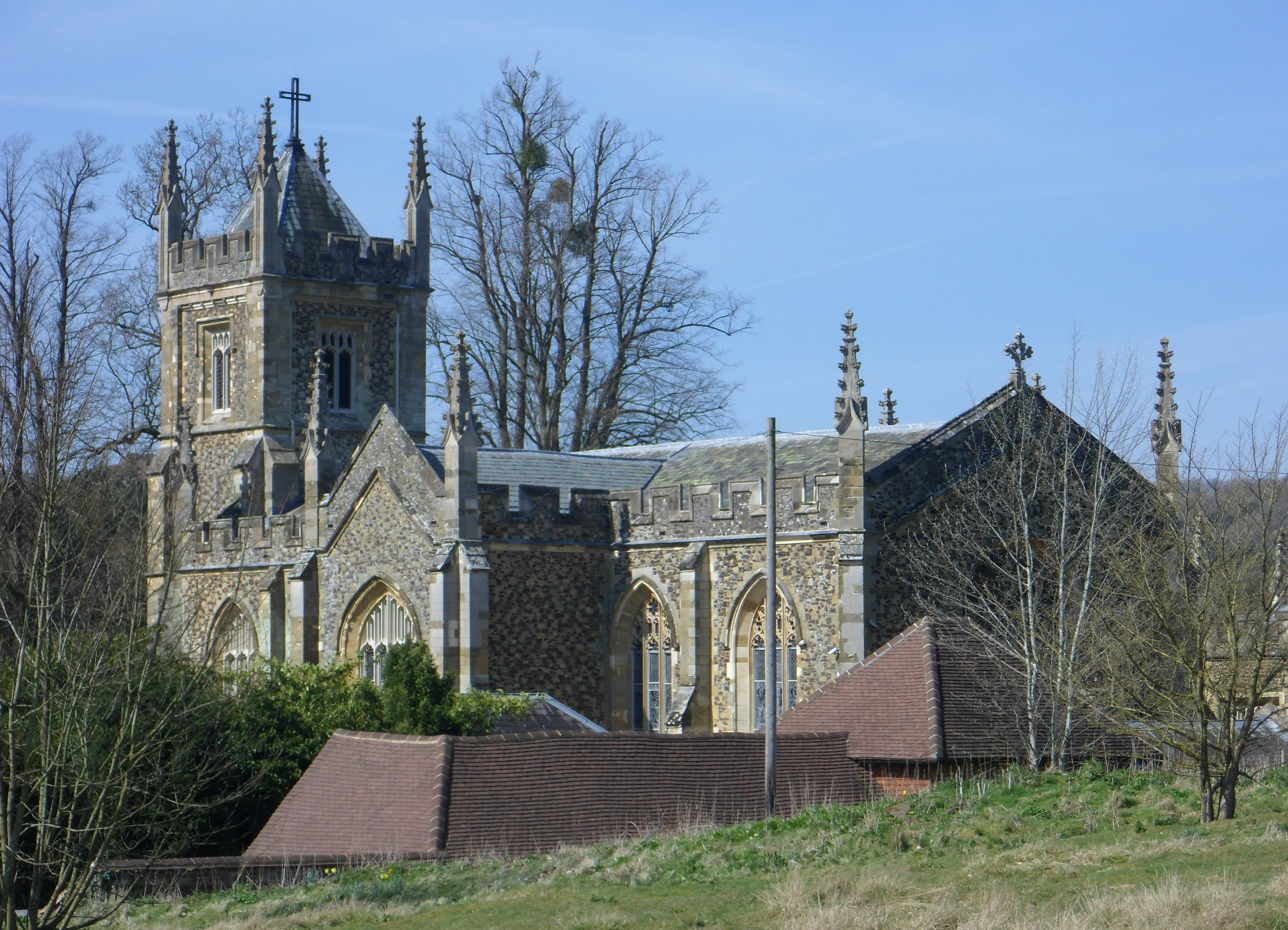
The Catholic Apostolic church built at Albury Park in 1840 for Drummond

Henry Drummond (5 December 1786 – 20 February 1860) was an English banker, politician and writer, best known as one of the founders of the Catholic Apostolic or Irvingite Church.

== Life ==
He was born at The Grange, near Northington, Hampshire, the eldest son of Henry Drummond, a prominent London banker; his mother was Anne, daughter of Henry Dundas. He was educated at Harrow and at Christ Church, Oxford, but took no degree. His name is connected with the university through the chair of political economy which he founded in 1825.

He entered Parliament in 1810 as the member for Plympton Erle and took an active interest from the first in nearly all departments of politics. Though thoroughly independent and often eccentric in his views, he acted generally with the Conservative Party. His speeches were often almost inaudible but were generally lucid and informing, and on occasion caustic and severe. He was appointed Sheriff of Surrey for 1826.

In 1817, Drummond met Robert Haldane at Geneva, and continued his movement against the Socinian tendencies then prevalent in that city. In later years he was intimately associated with the origin and spread of the Catholic Apostolic Church, which Edward Irving and others had founded in 1826. The Albury Conferences, meetings moderated by Hugh Boyd M‘Neile, of those who sympathized with some of the views of Irving were held for the study of prophecy at Drummond's seat, Albury Park, in Surrey. He contributed very liberally to the funds of the new church and he became one of its leading office-bearers, being first ordained as Angel of the Congregation in Albury and afterwards called as Apostle for Scotland and the Protestant part of Switzerland and was thus with the other "Apostles" and prophets responsible for its theology.

In December 1839, he was elected a Fellow of the Royal Society He retired in 1843 from his position as senior partner in the Charing Cross bank. From 1847 until his death, he represented West Surrey in parliament.

He died in 1860, intestate, a widower, at his main home Albury Park, leaving personal effects of under £16,000 (equivalent to about £1,700,000 in 2025). The Administration was extracted by one of his children who on her husband's succession became Louisa Percy, Duchess of Northumberland.

== Works ==
Drummond took a deep interest in religious subjects, and published books and pamphlets on the interpretation of prophecy, the circulation of the Apocrypha and the principles of Christianity. These included apologetics on behalf of the Catholic Apostolic Church. He published a History of Noble British Families in 1846. He also published in 1851 the Principles of Ecclesiastical Buildings and Ornament, printed anonymously by Thomas Bosworth.

Hugh McNeile dedicated his book "The Times of The Gentiles" to Henry Drummond in 1828. In this dedication he defends Drummond against attacks which were made upon him over the topic of Drummond's perceived novelty concerning the interpretation of Biblical prophecy.

== Family ==
Drummond had married his cousin Lady Henrietta Hay-Drummond, the daughter of Robert Hay-Drummond, 10th Earl of Kinnoull. They had three sons, all of whom predeceased him, and two daughters. His daughter Louisa, Duchess of Northumberland, was the wife of the 6th Duke of Northumberland.

== Legacy ==
There is a street near Melbourne in Carlton North, Victoria that has been claimed as named after him in Australia, but the local Council consider Thomas Drummond (1797–1840), the Scottish inventor, civil engineer and cartographer is the person in question.

Parliament of the United Kingdom
Preceded by Hon. William Harbord; Viscount Castlereagh	Member of Parliament for Plympton Erle; 1810–1812; With: Viscount Castlereagh	Succeeded by Ranald George Macdonald; George Duckett
Preceded by John Trotter; William Joseph Denison	Member of Parliament for West Surrey; 1847–1860; With: Willian Joseph Denison; William John Evelyn; John Ivatt Briscoe	Succeeded by George Cubitt; John Ivatt Briscoe
