= Deptford (UK Parliament constituency) =

Parliamentary constituency in the United Kingdom, 1885–1974

- Former borough constituency for the House of Commons
- Major settlements: Deptford and New Cross

1885–February 1974
- Seats: one
- Created from: Greenwich
- Replaced by: Lewisham Deptford

Deptford was a parliamentary constituency centred on the Deptford district of South London. It returned one Member of Parliament (MP) to the House of Commons of the Parliament of the United Kingdom.

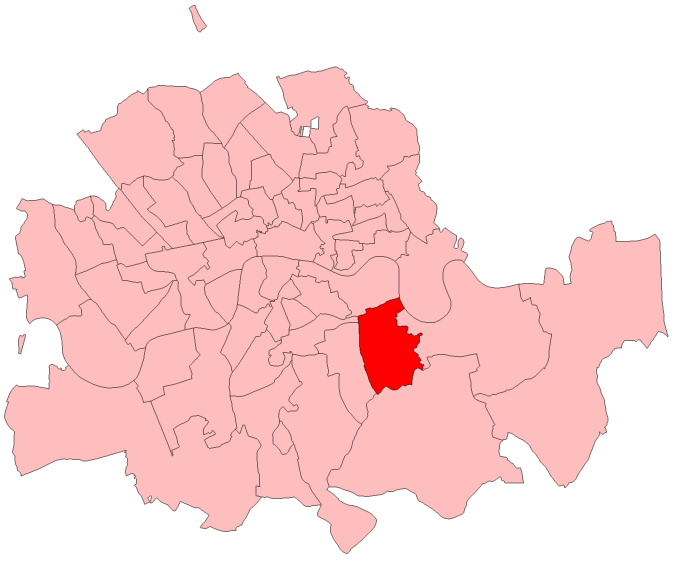
Deptford in London 1885-1918

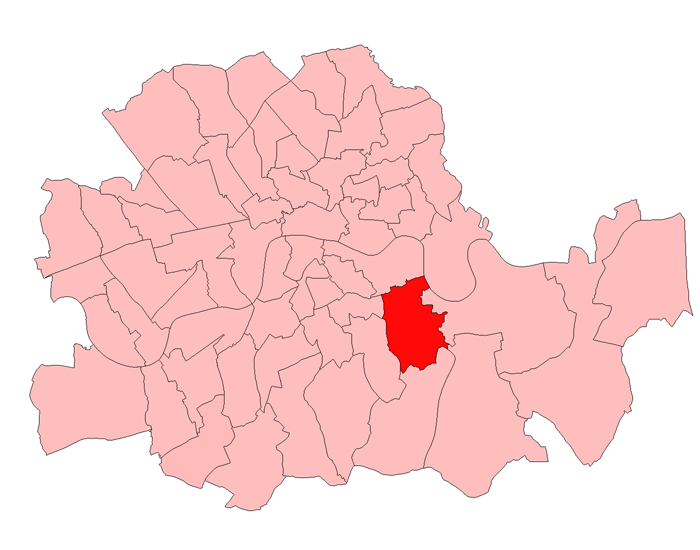
Deptford in London 1918-50

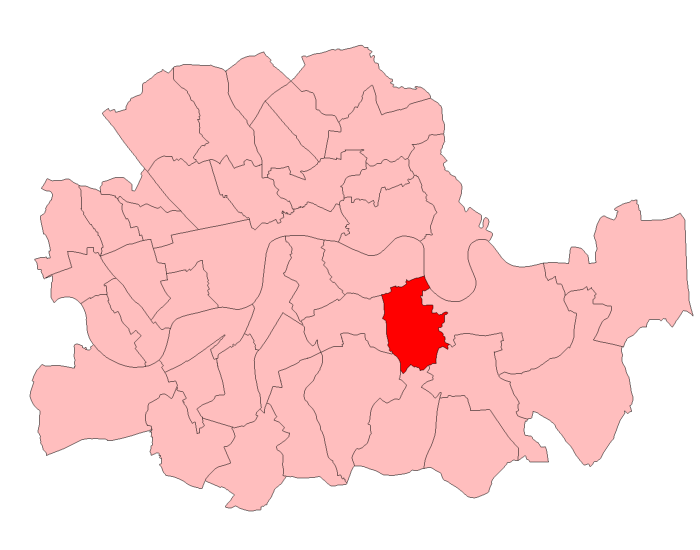
Deptford in London 1950-74

The constituency was created for the 1885 general election, and abolished for the February 1974 general election, when it was largely replaced by the new constituency of Lewisham Deptford.

== Boundaries ==
1885–1918: The parish of St Paul, Deptford, inclusive of Hatcham.

1918–1974: The Metropolitan Borough of Deptford.

== Members of Parliament ==
Year	Member	Party
1885	William John Evelyn	Conservative
1888	Charles Darling	Conservative
1897	Arthur Henry Aylmer Morton	Conservative
1906	C. W. Bowerman	Labour
1931	Denis Hanley	Conservative
1935	Walter Green	Labour
1945	John Wilmot	Labour
1950	Jack Cooper	Labour
1951	Sir Leslie Plummer	Labour
1963	John Silkin	Labour
1974	constituency abolished	

== Election results ==
=== Election in the 1970s ===
General election 1970: Deptford
Party	Candidate	Votes	%	±%
Labour	John Silkin	14,672	62.96	
Conservative	Michael Brotherton	7,355	31.56	
National Front	Martin Vaux	1,277	5.48	N/A
Majority		7,317	31.40	
Turnout		23,304	54.67	
Labour hold		Swing		

=== Elections in the 1960s ===
General election 1966: Deptford
Party	Candidate	Votes	%	±%
Labour	John Silkin	17,983	66.80	
Conservative	John R Giles	7,033	26.12	
British National	Gerald Rowe	1,906	7.08	New
Majority		10,950	40.68	
Turnout		26,922	60.27	
Labour hold		Swing		

General election 1964: Deptford
Party	Candidate	Votes	%	±%
Labour	John Silkin	17,676	62.44	
Conservative	Murray M Leask	8,248	29.13	
Independent	Colin M H Atkins	2,386	8.43	New
Majority		9,428	33.31	
Turnout		28,310	60.08	
Labour hold		Swing		

1963 Deptford by-election
Party	Candidate	Votes	%	±%
Labour	John Silkin	12,209	58.25	−3.70
Liberal	David John Howard Penwarden	4,726	22.55	New
Conservative	John D Brimacombe	4,023	19.20	−18.85
Majority		7,483	35.70	+11.80
Turnout		20,958		
Labour hold		Swing		

=== Elections in the 1950s ===
General election 1959: Deptford
Party	Candidate	Votes	%	±%
Labour	Leslie Plummer	21,226	61.95	
Conservative	John D Brimacombe	13,038	38.05	
Majority		8,188	23.90	
Turnout		34,264	69.34	
Labour hold		Swing		

General election 1955: Deptford
Party	Candidate	Votes	%	±%
Labour	Leslie Plummer	23,925	65.73	
Conservative	Irene Dowling	12,472	34.27	
Majority		11,453	31.46	
Turnout		36,397	69.62	
Labour hold		Swing		

General election 1951: Deptford
Party	Candidate	Votes	%	±%
Labour	Leslie Plummer	28,878	65.17	
Conservative	Irene Dowling	15,431	34.83	
Majority		13,447	30.34	
Turnout		44,309	80.27	
Labour hold		Swing		

General election 1950: Deptford
Party	Candidate	Votes	%	±%
Labour	Jack Cooper	28,230	63.07	
Conservative	Geoffrey F. Sarjeant	13,330	29.78	
Liberal	Edward Isaac Miller	2,637	5.89	New
Communist	Leslie Francis Stannard	562	1.26	New
Majority		14,900	33.29	
Turnout		44,759	81.61	
Labour hold		Swing		

=== Election in the 1940s ===
General election 1945: Deptford
Party	Candidate	Votes	%	±%
Labour	John Wilmot	22,313	73.47	
Conservative	Eric Cuddon	8,059	26.53	
Majority		14,254	46.94	
Turnout		30,372		
Labour hold		Swing		

=== Election in the 1930s ===
General election 1935: Deptford
Party	Candidate	Votes	%	±%
Labour Co-op	Walter Green	27,021	57.31	
Conservative	Malcolm Campbell	20,129	42.69	
Majority		6,892	14.62	N/A
Turnout		47,150		
Labour Co-op gain from Conservative		Swing		

General election 1931: Deptford
Party	Candidate	Votes	%	±%
Conservative	Denis Hanley	26,558	54.42	
Labour	C. W. Bowerman	22,244	45.58	
Majority		4,314	8.84	N/A
Turnout		48,802		
Conservative gain from Labour		Swing		

=== Election in the 1920s ===
General election 1929: Deptford
Party	Candidate	Votes	%	±%
Labour	C. W. Bowerman	26,848	55.2	+0.7
Unionist	Ernest Gates	14,832	30.5	−15.0
Liberal	H. Charles Bevan	6,935	14.3	New
Majority		12,016	24.7	+15.7
Turnout		48,615	68.2	−3.8
Registered electors		71,242		
Labour hold		Swing	+7.9	

General election 1924: Deptford
Party	Candidate	Votes	%	±%
Labour	C. W. Bowerman	21,903	54.5	−8.5
Unionist	James Hargreaves	18,279	45.5	+8.5
Majority		3,624	9.0	−17.0
Turnout		40,182	72.0	+8.7
Registered electors		55,797		
Labour hold		Swing	−8.5	

General election 1923: Deptford
Party	Candidate	Votes	%	±%
Labour	C. W. Bowerman	21,576	63.0	+10.4
Unionist	Marshall James Pike	12,666	37.0	−10.4
Majority		8,910	26.0	+20.8
Turnout		34,242	63.3	−2.9
Registered electors		54,135		
Labour hold		Swing	+10.4	

General election 1922: Deptford
Party	Candidate	Votes	%	±%
Labour	C. W. Bowerman	18,512	52.6	−1.8
Unionist	Marshall James Pike	16,687	47.4	+9.9
Majority		1,825	5.2	−11.7
Turnout		35,199	66.2	+16.0
Registered electors		53,195		
Labour hold		Swing	−5.9	

=== Elections in the 1910s ===
General election 1918: Deptford
Party	Candidate	Votes	%	±%
Labour	C. W. Bowerman	14,073	54.4	+3.0
Conservative	John Prestige	9,711	37.5	−11.1
NFDDSS	Frederick Alfred Rumsey	2,106	8.1	New
Majority		4,362	16.9	+14.1
Turnout		25,890	50.2	−31.3
Registered electors		51,611		
Labour hold		Swing	+7.1	

General election December 1910: Deptford
Party	Candidate	Votes	%	±%
Labour	C. W. Bowerman	6,357	51.4	−0.6
Conservative	Stuart Coats	5,999	48.6	+0.6
Majority		358	2.8	−1.2
Turnout		12,356	81.5	−5.8
Registered electors		15,159		
Labour hold		Swing	−0.6	

General election January 1910: Deptford
Party	Candidate	Votes	%	±%
Labour	C. W. Bowerman	6,880	52.0	−0.2
Conservative	Stuart Coats	6,358	48.0	+6.3
Majority		522	4.0	−6.5
Turnout		13,238	87.3	+9.8
Registered electors		15,159		
Labour hold		Swing	−3.3	

=== Elections in the 1900s ===
Vivian

General election 1906: Deptford
Party	Candidate	Votes	%	±%
Labour Repr. Cmte.	C. W. Bowerman	6,236	52.2	New
Conservative	Arthur Morton	4,977	41.7	−20.4
Liberal	Herbert Vivian	726	6.1	−31.8
Majority		1,259	10.5	N/A
Turnout		11,939	77.5	+10.6
Registered electors		15,397		
Labour Repr. Cmte. gain from Conservative		Swing	N/A	

General election 1900: Deptford
Party	Candidate	Votes	%	±%
Conservative	Arthur Morton	6,236	62.1	+6.0
Lib-Lab	Ben Jones	3,806	37.9	−6.0
Majority		2,430	24.2	+12.0
Turnout		10,042	66.9	−6.1
Registered electors		15,000		
Conservative hold		Swing	+6.0	

=== Elections in the 1890s ===
1897 Deptford by-election
Party	Candidate	Votes	%	±%
Conservative	Arthur Henry Aylmer Morton	5,317	51.6	−4.5
Liberal	John Benn	4,993	48.4	+4.5
Majority		324	3.2	−9.0
Turnout		10,310	74.3	+1.3
Registered electors		13,868		
Conservative hold		Swing	−4.5	

General election 1895: Deptford
Party	Candidate	Votes	%	±%
Conservative	Charles Darling	5,654	56.1	+3.3
Liberal	Thomas Macnamara	4,425	43.9	−3.3
Majority		1,229	12.2	+6.6
Turnout		10,079	73.0	−3.8
Registered electors		13,815		
Conservative hold		Swing	+3.3	

General election 1892: Deptford
Party	Candidate	Votes	%	±%
Conservative	Charles Darling	5,298	52.8	−1.9
Liberal	Edmond Fitzmaurice	4,733	47.2	+1.9
Majority		565	5.6	−3.8
Turnout		10,031	76.8	+4.9
Registered electors		13,066		
Conservative hold		Swing	−1.9	

=== Elections in the 1880s ===
By-election, 29 Feb 1888: Deptford
Party	Candidate	Votes	%	±%
Conservative	Charles Darling	4,345	51.6	−3.1
Liberal	Wilfrid Blunt	4,070	48.4	+3.1
Majority		275	3.2	−6.2
Turnout		8,415	80.3	+8.4
Registered electors		10,473		
Conservative hold		Swing	−3.1	

- Caused by Evelyn's resignation.

General election 1886: Deptford
Party	Candidate	Votes	%	±%
Conservative	William John Evelyn	3,682	54.7	+2.2
Liberal	Lalmohun Ghose	3,055	45.3	−2.2
Majority		627	9.4	+4.4
Turnout		6,737	71.9	−8.0
Registered electors		9,371		
Conservative hold		Swing	+2.2	

General election 1885: Deptford
Party	Candidate	Votes	%	±%
Conservative	William John Evelyn	3,927	52.5	
Liberal	Lalmohun Ghose	3,560	47.5	
Majority		367	5.0	
Turnout		7,487	79.9	
Registered electors		9,371		
Conservative win (new seat)				
