= Leslie Plummer =

British farmer, newspaper executive and politician

Sir Leslie Plummer MP

Chairman of the Overseas Food Corporation
- In office 16 February 1948 – 30 June 1950
- Succeeded by: Sir Eric Coates

Member of Parliament for Deptford
- In office 25 October 1951 – 15 April 1963
- Preceded by: Jack Cooper
- Succeeded by: John Silkin

Personal details
- Born: 2 June 1901 Demerara, British Guiana
- Died: 15 April 1963 (aged 61) New York City, U.S.
- Party: Labour
- Spouse: Beatrice Lapsker
- Occupation: Newspaper executive

Sir Leslie Arthur Plummer (2 June 1901 – 15 April 1963), known to his friends as Dick Plummer, was a British farmer, newspaper executive and politician. He was in charge of the Overseas Food Corporation during the disastrous Tanganyika groundnut scheme in the late 1940s; later he became a Labour Party Member of Parliament where he pioneered attempts to outlaw racial discrimination.

== Newspaper business ==
Plummer was born in Demerara, British Guiana, where his father was working. He was educated at Tottenham Grammar School in North London, and first worked on the managerial staff of the Daily Herald from 1919. In 1922 he became general manager for the New Leader, a paper edited by H. N. Brailsford as the party journal of the Independent Labour Party. Plummer shared the left-wing sentiments of the ILP. In 1923 Plummer married Beatrice Lapsker. They had no children.

Plummer was selected as Labour Party candidate for Birmingham Edgbaston in the mid-1920s but gave up the candidacy in May 1927. He left the New Leader to set up The Miner, a journal for the Miners' Federation of Great Britain, in 1926.

== Beaverbrook newspapers ==
He became an executive of the Daily Express group, and was a Director by 1941. In 1943 he was general manager of the company. Plummer prospered at the Daily Express group despite disagreeing on politics with the proprietor Lord Beaverbrook because of his own skill as an administrator and Beaverbrook's known liking for talent-spotting among left-wingers.

== Overseas Food Corporation ==
Plummer left the Daily Express when he was named by John Strachey as chairman-designate of the Overseas Food Corporation at the end of 1947. However the appointment was not confirmed until February 1948. The Corporation was created to take charge of the Tanganyika groundnut scheme, a massive project to cultivate peanuts on 325 million acres (1,320,000 km²) of scrubland in Tanganyika Territory. The scheme was well advanced by the time Plummer moved in, but he was an enthusiastic supporter. In January 1949 he went out to take personal charge of the scheme.

== Groundnuts scheme scandal ==
In the King's Birthday Honours list of June 1949, Plummer was appointed as a Knight Bachelor. However, by the summer of 1949 it was clear that the groundnut scheme was in trouble, having gone over budget. The Conservative Party in the House of Commons moved a motion to reduce the estimate in respect of the scheme on 27 July 1949. In November, one member of the Overseas Food Corporation board, A.J. Wakefield, became so critical of the management of the scheme that the Minister determined to dismiss him. Wakefield offered to resign only if Plummer did so as well; this was unacceptable to Strachey and Wakefield was dismissed. Plummer and Wakefield had a lengthy exchange of public statements, in which Wakefield accused Plummer of suppressing his suggestions.

Plummer was criticised in an editorial in The Times for "failing to restore confidence (even among his staff) in the higher conduct of the scheme". His appointment was called into question by Alan Lennox-Boyd because Strachey had been an old colleague of his in the Independent Labour Party. The next month, Plummer was also criticised by the Conservatives for giving a contract for air transport to the nationalised British Overseas Airways Corporation rather than two private airlines which had submitted lower tenders, one of whom subsequently went out of business. A House of Lords debate on the groundnut scheme on 14 December 1949 resulted in a vote of censure of the government, after the Marquess of Salisbury attacked Plummer for being an entirely inappropriate choice to run it.

The author Alan Wood, who had headed the Information Unit of the Overseas Food Corporation, resigned to publish a book on the serious failures in Tanganyika, The Groundnut Affair (1950). In March 1950, in the House of Commons John Boyd-Carpenter asked the Minister of Food to make a statement about attempts made by Plummer to stop the publication of the book.

== Resignation ==
Plummer announced his resignation in May 1950, with the new Minister of Food Maurice Webb explaining that the role of the Overseas Food Corporation had changed fundamentally in practice compared with the basis on which Plummer had accepted it. The announcement was said to have "brought the biggest cheer from the Opposition benches that has been heard in the House of Commons for a long time".

== Deptford MP ==
In 1951 Plummer was adopted as Labour Party candidate for Deptford. During the campaign, his local opponents brought up the large amount of money wasted on the Groundnuts scheme. Plummer responded by saying that all his money was invested in a 900-acre (4 km²) farm in Essex and that although he despised the capitalist system, he had been "extremely fortunate under it and benefited from it". He won the seat easily in the general election.

Plummer's maiden speech on 4 March 1952 was on the subject of economic development in Africa. He made an early mark by proposing to make illegal the defamation of any body of persons, including a race. Plummer was critical of the policies of the Churchill government in Kenya where he felt the Mau Mau Uprising was rooted in poverty and Kikuyu prisoners were mistreated. Another preoccupation of Plummer was slum landlords in his constituency.

== Television ==
Plummer firmly opposed commercial television, distrusting the motives of advertisers. He claimed television companies would be tempted to use "the cheap stuff from America". During the controversy over the BBC's broadcast of George Orwell's 1984 in 1954, Plummer helped to sponsor a motion deploring the attacks on the BBC for putting on "programmes capable of appreciation by adult minds".

== Racial discrimination ==
During the 1955 general election campaign, Plummer was embarrassed when he turned up to give a speech in Hemel Hempstead to find that the caretaker had not unlocked the hall. A second meeting nearby had been cancelled when only five people turned up. In June 1956 he was taken ill while in the House of Commons, being attended to by Doctor MPs Dr Charles Hill and Dr Barnett Stross. He introduced the Racial Discrimination Bill in 1957, aiming to make discrimination on racial grounds illegal; the Bill was talked out by Conservative MP Ronald Bell.

== Bank rate leak ==
In November 1957 Plummer caused uproar on the Conservative benches of the House of Commons by accusing the government of leaking changes to the Bank of England interest rate to the Daily Telegraph and Financial Times. A judicial inquiry was set up but found no evidence of any impropriety.

== Police guard ==
Plummer accused the National Labour Party, a far right-wing group, of being behind a rise of antisemitism in London. The party demanded he substantiate the charge or withdraw it. Plummer maintained his challenge. In August 1960 it was revealed that Plummer had received threatening phone calls and eventually a death threat in a letter from the "Adolf Hitler Memorial League". At the end of April 1960 the police put an armed guard on his flat in Hampstead. The threatening letters continued.

== Libel case ==
The British National Party nominated candidates in local elections in Deptford in 1961, who issued an election address which attacked Plummer under the heading "Your Pro-Black M.P." and accused him of "[coming] down solidly on the side of coloured spivs and their vice dens as opposed to the white people of Deptford". Plummer sued for libel, and was awarded £2,000 in damages.

== Death ==
In the 1960s Plummer became interested in promoting East-West trade. He was elected Vice-Chairman of the Parliamentary group on this subject in March 1961. He was forced to apologise to Sir Robert Grimston, a Deputy Speaker, when he wrongly accused him of joining a pressure group for commercial radio. He also often took up issues of human rights abuses in Spain. On 15 April 1963, Plummer died suddenly in New York City, where he had gone for a lecture tour.

Parliament of the United Kingdom
| Preceded by Jack Cooper | Member of Parliament for Deptford; 1951–1963 | Succeeded by John Silkin |
