= Lewisham Deptford =

UK Parliament constituency (1974–2024)

Coordinates: 51.47°N 0.04°W

- Former borough constituency for the House of Commons
- Boundary of Lewisham Deptford in Greater London
- County: Greater London
- Electorate: 67,590 (December 2010)
- Borough: London Borough of Lewisham
- Major settlements: Deptford, New Cross and Lewisham

1974–2024
- Seats: One
- Created from: Deptford; Lewisham North
- Replaced by: Lewisham North

Map of boundaries 2010–2024

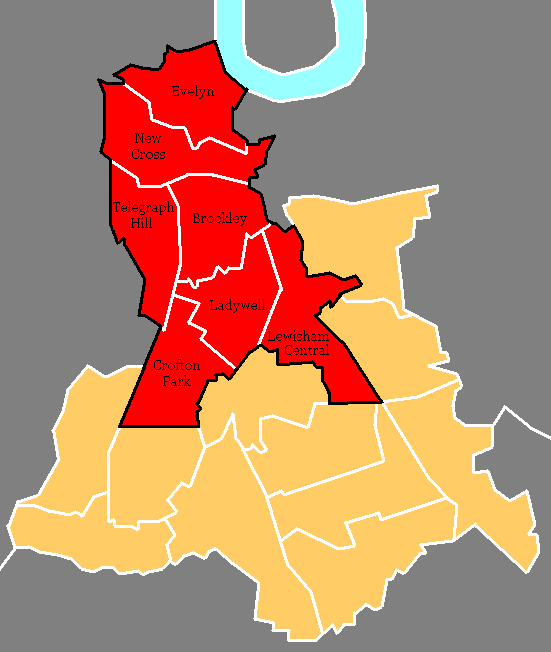
2010 wards and boundaries of Lewisham Deptford Parliament constituency (red) shown within the London Borough of Lewisham (orange)

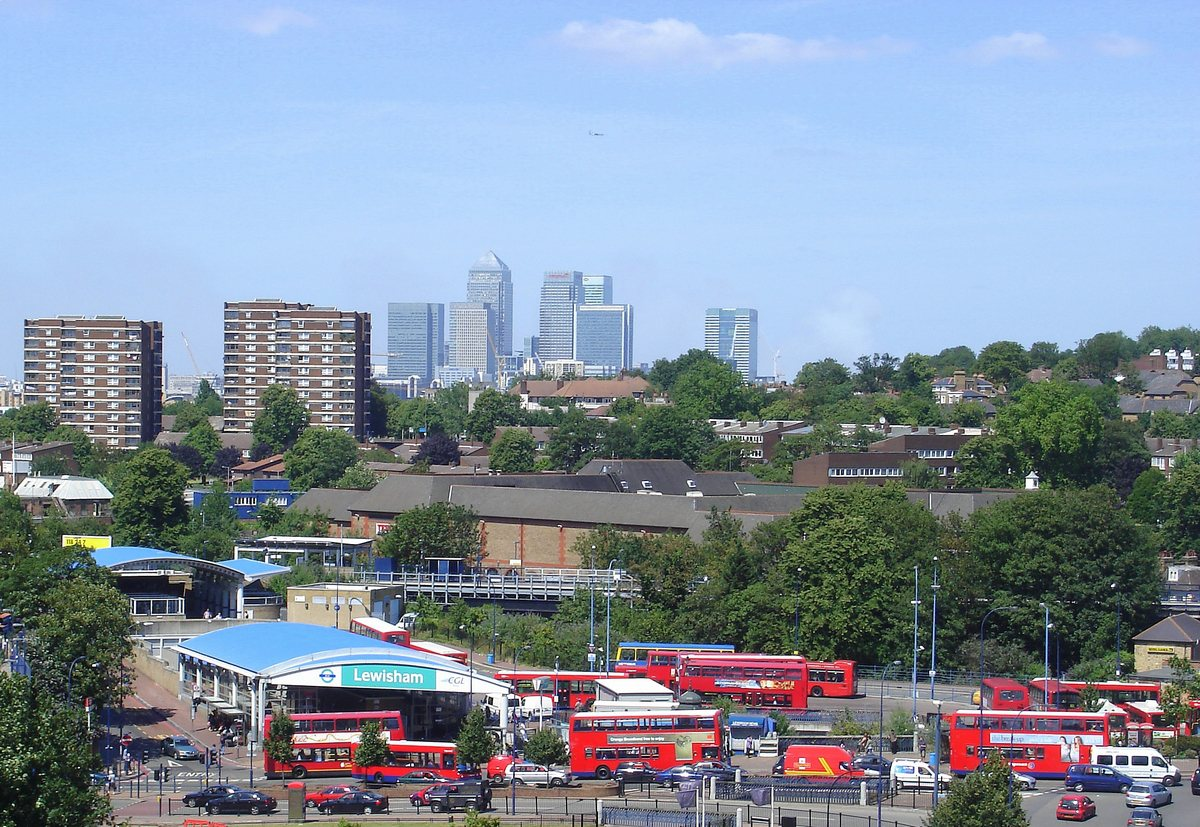
Lewisham town centre

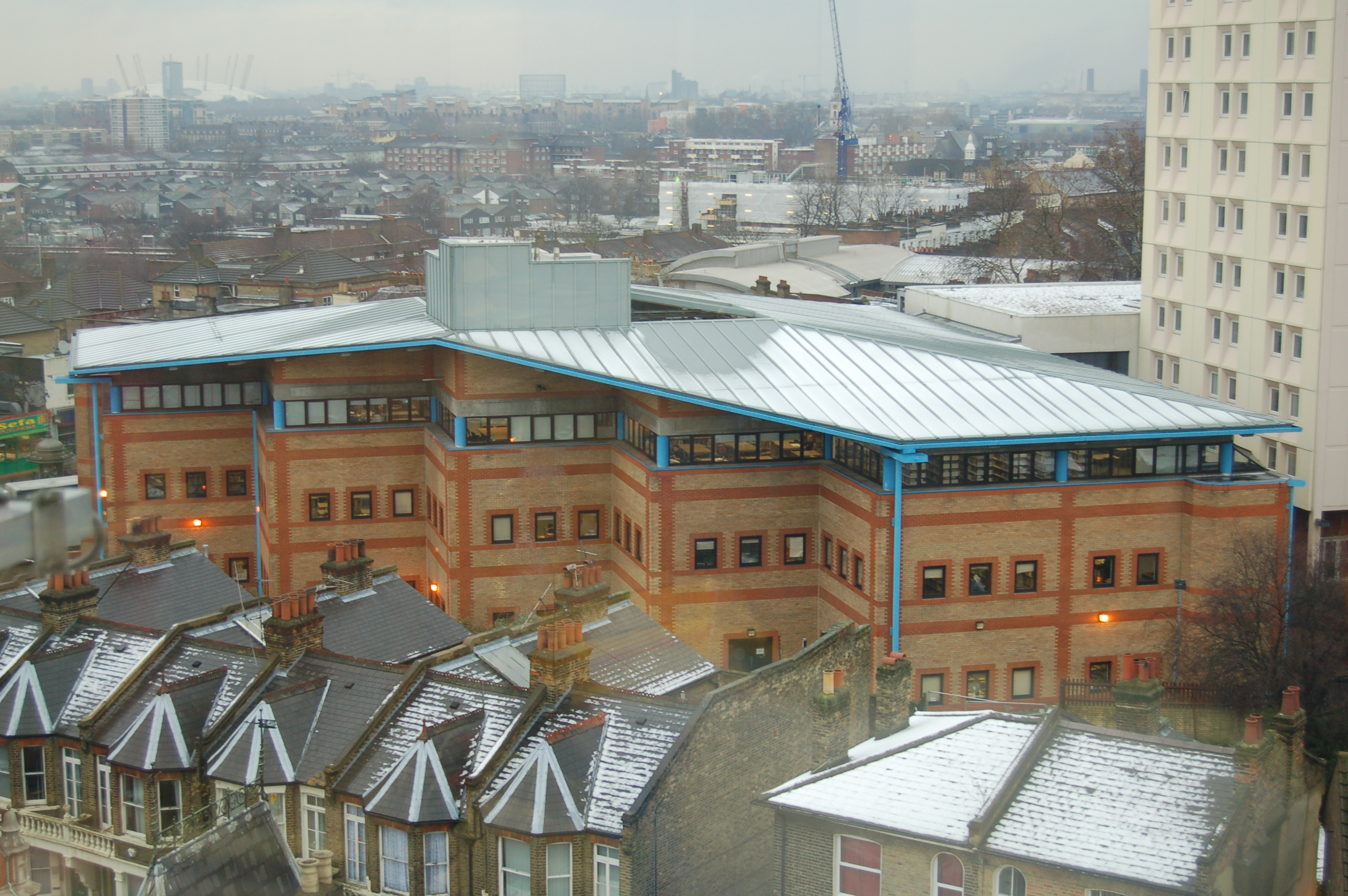
Goldsmiths' College in New Cross

Lewisham Deptford was a parliamentary constituency (Note: A borough constituency (for the purposes of election expenses and type of returning officer).) represented in the House of Commons (Note: As with all constituencies, the constituency elects one Member of Parliament (MP) by the first past the post system of election at least every five years.) of the United Kingdom.

Following the completion of the 2023 review of Westminster constituencies, the seat was abolished. Most of its area was included in the re-established Lewisham North constituency, which was first contested in the 2024 general election.

== History ==
This seat was created in 1974. It remained largely urban in its constituent areas following reform by the Boundary Commission. The area of Deptford, situated wholly within the seat, was a major London dockyard and in its early history contained chandleries, repair yards, connected with the Royal Navy, later having a high concentration of London's expansive import and export wharves and warehouses; this extended well within the 2010-drawn confines of the seat towards New Cross which had major railway yards.

== Constituency profile ==
This constituency covered the north and north-western parts of the London Borough of Lewisham, including Deptford, New Cross, Brockley, Ladywell and part of central Lewisham.

The area developed partly around the former Deptford Dockyard, the docks and associated industries along the Thames, as well as the railway infrastructure around New Cross. These former industrial sites underwent residential redevelopment during the late 20th and early 21st centuries.

Goldsmiths, University of London, in New Cross, was located in the constituency, giving the seat a substantial student minority to the electorate.

The Den, the home ground of Millwall F.C., was situated near the western boundary of the constituency.

== Political History ==
Lewisham Deptford was represented by the Labour Party throughout its existence from 1974 to 2024. Its three MPs were John Silkin, Joan Ruddock and Vicky Foxcroft.

Labour won an absolute majority of the vote at every general election in the constituency except 1983, when it received 48.3%. The party share reached 77.0% in 2017, and was 70.8% at the constituency's final general election in 2019. In the 2016 European Union membership referendum, an estimated 75.4% of voters in the constituency voted to remain in the European Union.

The constituency was abolished ahead of the 2024 general election as part of the 2023 review of Westminster constituencies. Much of its area became part of the new Lewisham North constituency.

== Boundaries ==
1974–1983: The London Borough of Lewisham wards of Brockley, Deptford, Drake, Grinling Gibbons, Ladywell, Marlowe, and Pepys.

1983–2010: The London Borough of Lewisham wards of Blythe Hill, Crofton Park, Drake, Evelyn, Grinling Gibbons, Ladywell, Marlowe, and Pepys.

2010–2024: The London Borough of Lewisham wards of Brockley, Crofton Park, Evelyn, Ladywell, Lewisham Central, New Cross, Telegraph Hill and part of Hither Green ward.

The constituency covered the northern and north-western parts of the London Borough of Lewisham.

The Fifth Periodic Review of Westminster constituencies which redrew this seat in 2010 also resulted in the creation of a new cross-borough constituency of Lewisham West and Penge which took electoral wards from the London Boroughs of Lewisham and Bromley.

== Members of Parliament ==
| Election | Member | Party | Notes |
|---|---|---|---|
| Feb 1974 | John Silkin | Labour | Government Chief Whip 1966–69. Minister of Agriculture, Fisheries and Food 1976–79. Died in April 1987; seat remained vacant until general election in June. |
| 1987 | Dame Joan Ruddock | Labour | |
| 2015 | Vicky Foxcroft | Labour | |

== Election results ==
=== Elections in 2010s ===
General election 2019: Lewisham Deptford
| Party | Candidate | Votes | % | ±% |
|---|---|---|---|---|
| Labour | Vicky Foxcroft | 39,216 | 70.8 | −6.2 |
| Conservative | Gavin Haran | 6,303 | 11.4 | −2.3 |
| Liberal Democrats | Bobby Dean | 5,774 | 10.4 | +5.1 |
| Green | Andrea Fuller | 3,085 | 5.6 | +2.6 |
| Brexit Party | Moses Etienne | 789 | 1.4 | New |
| Independent | Tan Bui | 130 | 0.2 | New |
| Alliance for Green Socialism | John Lloyd | 71 | 0.1 | New |
| Majority | | 32,913 | 59.4 | −3.9 |
| Turnout | | 55,368 | 68.7 | −1.5 |
| Registered electors | | 80,617 | | |
| Labour hold | | Swing | −1.9 | |

General election 2017: Lewisham Deptford
| Party | Candidate | Votes | % | ±% |
|---|---|---|---|---|
| Labour | Vicky Foxcroft | 42,461 | 77.0 | +16.8 |
| Conservative | Melanie McLean | 7,562 | 13.7 | −1.2 |
| Liberal Democrats | Bobby Dean | 2,911 | 5.3 | 0.0 |
| Green | John Coughlin | 1,640 | 3.0 | −9.5 |
| CPA | Malcolm Martin | 252 | 0.5 | −0.1 |
| Animal Welfare | Laura McAnea | 225 | 0.4 | New |
| The Realists' Party | Jane Lawrence | 61 | 0.1 | New |
| Majority | | 34,899 | 63.3 | +17.9 |
| Turnout | | 55,112 | 70.2 | +5.6 |
| Registered electors | | 78,468 | | |
| Labour hold | | Swing | +9.0 | |

General election 2015: Lewisham Deptford
| Party | Candidate | Votes | % | ±% |
|---|---|---|---|---|
| Labour | Vicky Foxcroft | 28,572 | 60.2 | +6.5 |
| Conservative | Bim Afolami | 7,056 | 14.9 | +1.4 |
| Green | John Coughlin | 5,932 | 12.5 | +5.8 |
| Liberal Democrats | Michael Bukola | 2,497 | 5.3 | −18.1 |
| UKIP | Massimo DiMambro | 2,013 | 4.2 | New |
| People Before Profit | Helen Mercer | 666 | 1.4 | New |
| CPA | Malcolm Martin | 300 | 0.6 | −0.6 |
| TUSC | Chris Flood | 286 | 0.6 | New |
| Democratic Reform | Phil Badger | 74 | 0.2 | New |
| Independent | David Harvey | 30 | 0.1 | New |
| Majority | | 21,516 | 45.3 | +15.0 |
| Turnout | | 47,426 | 64.6 | +3.1 |
| Registered electors | | 73,428 | | |
| Labour hold | | Swing | +2.6 | |

General election 2010: Lewisham Deptford
| Party | Candidate | Votes | % | ±% |
|---|---|---|---|---|
| Labour | Joan Ruddock | 22,132 | 53.7 | –1.9 |
| Liberal Democrats | Tam Langley | 9,633 | 23.4 | +5.4 |
| Conservative | Gemma Townsend | 5,551 | 13.5 | +0.8 |
| Green | Darren Johnson | 2,772 | 6.7 | –3.3 |
| Socialist | Ian Page | 645 | 1.6 | –0.6 |
| CPA | Malcolm Martin | 487 | 1.2 | New |
| Majority | | 12,499 | 30.3 | –8.6 |
| Turnout | | 41,220 | 61.5 | +10.6 |
| Registered electors | | 67,058 | | |
| Labour hold | | Swing | –7.2 | |

=== Elections in 2000s ===
General election 2005: Lewisham, Deptford
| Party | Candidate | Votes | % | ±% |
|---|---|---|---|---|
| Labour | Joan Ruddock | 16,902 | 55.6 | −9.4 |
| Liberal Democrats | Columba Blango | 5,091 | 16.8 | +5.1 |
| Conservative | James Cartlidge | 3,773 | 12.4 | 0.0 |
| Green | Darren Johnson | 3,367 | 11.4 | +4.9 |
| Socialist | Ian Page | 742 | 2.4 | −1.9 |
| UKIP | David Holland | 518 | 1.7 | New |
| Majority | | 11,811 | 38.8 | −13.8 |
| Turnout | | 30,393 | 51.5 | +3.2 |
| Registered electors | | 58,390 | | |
| Labour hold | | Swing | −7.2 | |

General election 2001: Lewisham, Deptford
| Party | Candidate | Votes | % | ±% |
|---|---|---|---|---|
| Labour | Joan Ruddock | 18,915 | 65.0 | −5.8 |
| Conservative | Cordelia McCartney | 3,622 | 12.4 | −2.3 |
| Liberal Democrats | Andrew Wiseman | 3,409 | 11.7 | +2.8 |
| Green | Darren Johnson | 1,901 | 6.5 | New |
| Socialist Alliance | Ian Page | 1,260 | 4.3 | New |
| Majority | | 15,293 | 52.6 | −3.51 |
| Turnout | | 29,107 | 48.3 | −9.6 |
| Registered electors | | 60,275 | | |
| Labour hold | | Swing | −1.8 | |

=== Elections in 1990s ===
General election 1997: Lewisham, Deptford
| Party | Candidate | Votes | % | ±% |
|---|---|---|---|---|
| Labour | Joan Ruddock | 23,827 | 70.8 | +9.9 |
| Conservative | Irene Kimm | 4,949 | 14.7 | −13.2 |
| Liberal Democrats | Kofi Appiah | 3,004 | 8.9 | −2.4 |
| Socialist Labour | John Mulrenan | 996 | 2.9 | New |
| Referendum | Shelagh Shepherd | 868 | 2.5 | New |
| Majority | | 18,878 | 56.1 | +23.1 |
| Turnout | | 33,644 | 57.9 | −7.2 |
| Registered electors | | 58,141 | | |
| Labour hold | | Swing | +11.5 | |

General election 1992: Lewisham, Deptford
| Party | Candidate | Votes | % | ±% |
|---|---|---|---|---|
| Labour | Joan Ruddock | 22,574 | 60.9 | +10.6 |
| Conservative | T. A. J. O'Neill | 10,336 | 27.9 | −4.2 |
| Liberal Democrats | J. C. Brightwell | 4,181 | 11.3 | −6.2 |
| Majority | | 12,238 | 33.0 | +14.8 |
| Turnout | | 37,091 | 65.1 | +0.2 |
| Registered electors | | 57,014 | | |
| Labour hold | | Swing | +7.4 | |

=== Elections in 1980s ===
General election 1987: Lewisham, Deptford
| Party | Candidate | Votes | % | ±% |
|---|---|---|---|---|
| Labour | Joan Ruddock | 18,724 | 50.3 | +2.0 |
| Conservative | Martyn Punyer | 11,953 | 32.1 | +0.6 |
| SDP | Anne−Marie Braun | 6,513 | 17.5 | −1.3 |
| Majority | | 6,771 | 18.2 | +1.4 |
| Turnout | | 37,190 | 64.9 | +3.7 |
| Registered electors | | 58,151 | | |
| Labour hold | | Swing | +0.6 | |

General election 1983: Lewisham, Deptford
| Party | Candidate | Votes | % | ±% |
|---|---|---|---|---|
| Labour | John Silkin | 17,360 | 48.3 | −5.9 |
| Conservative | Robin Wheatley | 11,328 | 31.5 | −1.0 |
| SDP | Denise Abbott | 6,734 | 18.8 | New |
| BNP | P. Wilson | 317 | 0.9 | New |
| Assassin's Bullett | S. B. Housego | 173 | 0.5 | New |
| Majority | | 6,032 | 16.8 | −4.9 |
| Turnout | | 35,912 | 61.2 | −2.5 |
| Registered electors | | 58,663 | | |
| Labour hold | | Swing | -2.4 | |

=== Elections in 1970s ===
General election 1979: Deptford
| Party | Candidate | Votes | % | ±% |
|---|---|---|---|---|
| Labour | John Silkin | 19,391 | 54.22 | −4.65 |
| Conservative | David Grant | 11,638 | 32.54 | +9.96 |
| Liberal | Nicholas Rowden | 2,774 | 7.76 | −5.97 |
| National Front | Dr Robert Mitchel | 1,490 | 4.17 | −0.65 |
| Socialist Unity | Janet Maguire | 274 | 0.77 | New |
| Workers Revolutionary | Gilbert Dacres | 198 | 0.55 | New |
| Majority | | 7,753 | 21.68 | −15.63 |
| Turnout | | 35,765 | 63.76 | +5.12 |
| Registered electors | | 56,096 | | |
| Labour hold | | Swing | | |

General election October 1974: Deptford
| Party | Candidate | Votes | % | ±% |
|---|---|---|---|---|
| Labour | John Silkin | 21,145 | 58.87 | +4.76 |
| Conservative | C. H. Cross | 8,111 | 22.58 | −3.81 |
| Liberal | M. Steele | 4,931 | 13.73 | −5.77 |
| National Front | Richard Edmonds | 1,731 | 4.82 | New |
| Majority | | 13,034 | 36.31 | +8.59 |
| Turnout | | 35,918 | 58.68 | −10.43 |
| Registered electors | | 61,210 | | |
| Labour hold | | Swing | | |

General election February 1974: Deptford
| Party | Candidate | Votes | % | ±% |
|---|---|---|---|---|
| Labour | John Silkin | 22,699 | 54.11 | |
| Conservative | C. H. Cross | 11,070 | 26.39 | |
| Liberal | M. Steele | 8,181 | 19.50 | |
| Majority | | 11,629 | 27.72 | |
| Turnout | | 41,950 | 69.11 | |
| Registered electors | | 60,703 | | |
| Labour win (new seat) | | | | |

== See also ==
- List of parliamentary constituencies in London
