= George Perceval, 6th Earl of Egmont =

Royal Navy Admiral and Tory politician (1794–1874)

Admiral The Right Honourable The Earl of Egmont
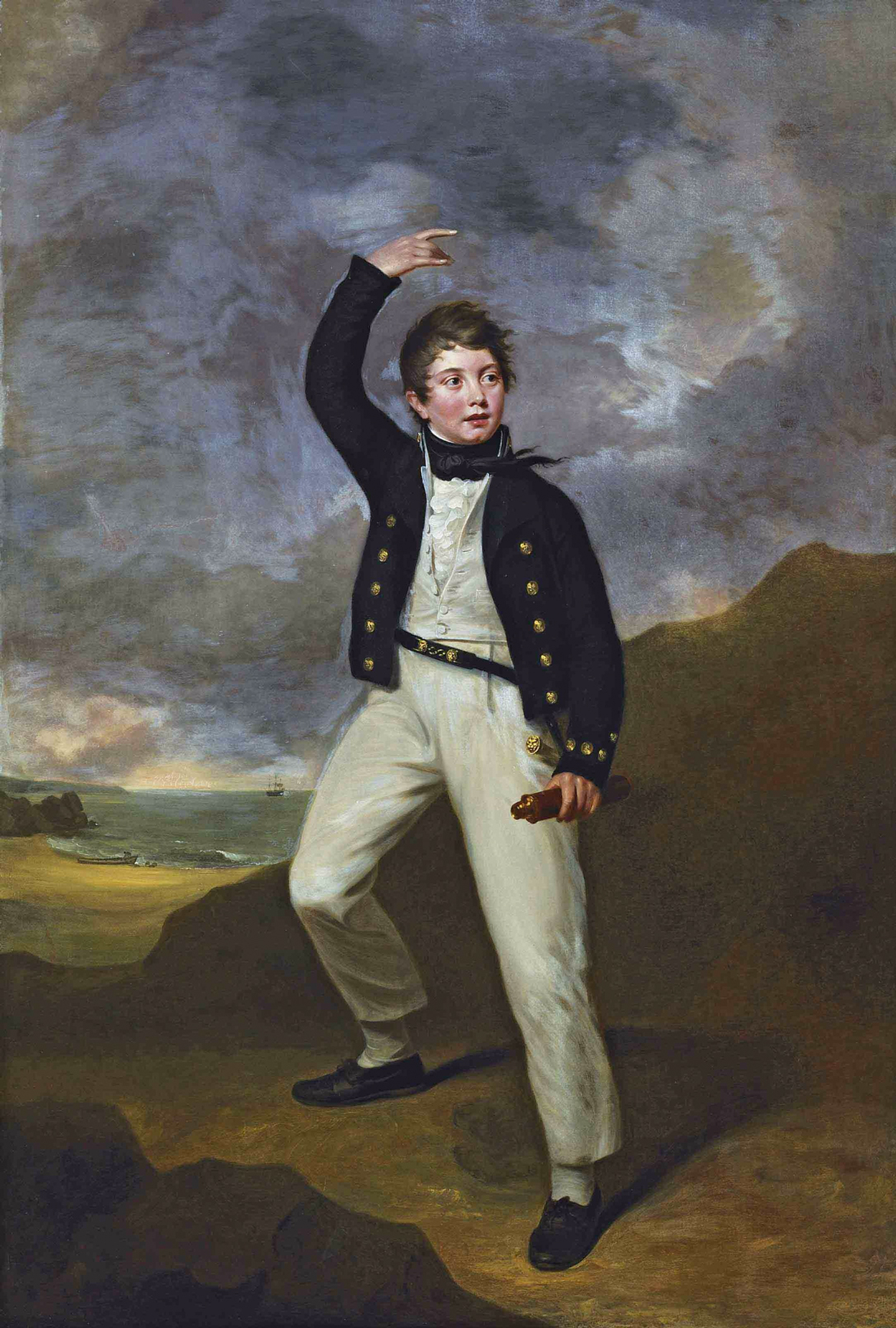
- Portrait as a young naval officer, by George Francis Joseph
- Born: 14 March 1794
- Died: 2 August 1874 (aged 80); Nork House, Banstead, Surrey, England
- Military career
- Allegiance: United Kingdom
- Branch: Royal Navy
- Service years: 1805–1874
- Rank: Admiral
- Commands: HMS Infernal; HMS Britomart
- Conflicts: Napoleonic Wars; Battle of Trafalgar; Battle of Maguelone; War of 1812; Battle of Hampden; Bombardment of Algiers
- Awards: Naval General Service Medal
- Education: Harrow School
- Spouse: Jane Hornby (m. 1819; died 1870)
- Father: Charles Perceval
- Relatives: General Thomas Wilson (maternal grandfather); Charles Perceval (nephew)

Admiral George James Perceval, 6th Earl of Egmont (14 March 1794 – 2 August 1874), known as the Lord Arden between 1840 and 1841, was a British naval commander and Tory politician.

== Background ==
Egmont was the third but eldest surviving son of Charles Perceval, 2nd Baron Arden, eldest son of John Perceval, 2nd Earl of Egmont, by his second wife Catherine, Baroness Arden. Prime Minister Spencer Perceval was his uncle.

== Naval career ==
Egmont left Harrow school and joined the Royal Navy as a midshipman in August 1805. He fought in HMS Orion at the Battle of Trafalgar the same year, aged eleven. During the Bombardment of Algiers in 1816 he commanded HMS Infernal. He was promoted to rear-admiral on 27 August 1851, to vice-admiral in 1857 and to admiral in 1863.

== Political career ==
Egmont was returned to Parliament as one of two representatives for Surrey West in 1837, a seat he held until 1840. The latter year he succeeded his father in the barony of Arden and entered the House of Lords. The following year he also succeeded his half-first cousin once removed, Henry, as sixth Earl of Egmont.

The wills of the 4th and 5th Earls of Egmont were not proven until 1857, after the death of the family solicitor Sir Edward Tierney, by Tierney's son-in-law Sir William Darell. The 6th Earl contested the 5th Earl's will in 1863, on the grounds that Tierney had taken advantage of the 5th Earl's drunkenness to provide a misleading valuation of the estates which influenced the drafting of the will. The 6th Earl ultimately settled out of court with Darell, paying £125,000 for the return of the family estates in Churchtown, County Cork; Tierney and his heirs had realized an estimated £300,000 for their stewardship.

== Family and parting assets ==
Lord Egmont married Jane, daughter of John Hornby, in 1819. They had no children. Lady Egmont died in October 1870. He survived his wife by four years and died in August 1874, aged 80. He was succeeded in the earldom by his nephew, Charles.

His probate was sworn the same year at under a rounded threshold of £350,000 (equivalent to about £34,200,000 in 2025), the public calendar of which states he died at Nork House, Banstead, which was one of his addresses, the others being 26 St James's Place, St James's and the mansion of Cowdray Park, West Sussex which takes in Cowdray House (extensive and in part very tall, crenular medieval, Tudor and Stuart ruins).

== See also ==
- O'Byrne, William Richard (1849). "Perceval, George James" . A Naval Biographical Dictionary . John Murray – via Wikisource.

Parliament of the United Kingdom
Preceded by Charles Barclay; William Denison	Member of Parliament for Surrey West; 1837–1840; With: William Denison	Succeeded by John Trotter; William Denison
Peerage of Ireland
Preceded by Henry Perceval	Earl of Egmont; 1841–1874	Succeeded by Charles George Perceval
Preceded by Charles George Perceval	Baron Arden; 1840–1874	Succeeded by Charles George Perceval
Peerage of the United Kingdom
Preceded by Charles George Perceval	Baron Arden; 1840–1874	Succeeded by Charles George Perceval
