= William Evelyn (died 1908) =

19th century British MP

William John Evelyn from a portrait by Havell (1884)

William John Evelyn JP DL (27 July 1822 - 26 July 1908) was a British Member of Parliament, landowner and philanthropist. He was MP for Surrey West in 1849 and again for Deptford in 1885.

Evelyn was the eldest son of George Evelyn and his wife, Mary Jane, daughter of J. H. Massy-Dawson, MP, of Ballynacourty, Co. Tipperary, Ireland. He was a descendant of the diarist and polymath John Evelyn and succeeded to the family estates in Surrey, centred around Wotton House, Surrey, which had been the birthplace of his ancestor the diarist. He was often referred to locally as "the Squire".

He went to Cheam School from 1835 until 1837 when he then went to Rugby, and from there to Balliol College, Oxford where he obtained his Master's degree in 1844.

He was elected as a Conservative Member of Parliament for Western Surrey at a by-election in 1849, and re-elected in 1852. He stood down at the next (1857) general election and spent a year in 1860 as High Sheriff of Surrey. He later returned to the House of Commons as Member for Deptford in 1885, resigning in 1888 by becoming Steward of the Manor of Northstead after falling out with his party as a result of events in Mitchelstown, Ireland where police shot on protesters and killed three people. Subsequently, Lord Salisbury's government accepted the police version of events and refused to condemn their actions; Evelyn was horrified by this and resigned from parliament. The by-election which followed would be contested by his good friend Wilfred Blunt from an Irish prison. Evelyn thoroughly disapproved of the Boer War, he considered it had been made in the interest of capitalists and that it was unjust and cruel. At the time this could have been thought unpatriotic of him.

In 1869, on the closing of the Deptford Dockyard, he purchased back from the government as much of the site of Sayes Court as was available and by 1876 was turning some of this into a recreation ground for his Deptford tenants. In 1886, he dedicated an acre and a half of the Sayes Court recreation ground that he had created, in perpetuity to the public and a permanent provision was made for the Evelyn estate to cover the expense of maintenance and caretaking. In 1884 he sold land then being used as market gardens in Deptford to the London County Council for less than its market value, as well as paying £2000 towards the cost of its purchase. This was officially opened to the public as Deptford Park on 7 June 1897.

His country seat at Wotton House was damaged by fire and substantially rebuilt by him in the 1870s. His monogram (initials) appears over the front door in stone, and plentifully over the external decorations of the house.

Evelyn married, in 1873, Frances Harriet (d 1897), daughter of Rev. George V. Chichester, Vicar of Drummaul, Ireland; by whom he had one son and four daughters. He was succeeded in the Wotton House estates by his only son, John Harcourt Chichester Evelyn (1876-1922).

Parliament of the United Kingdom
Preceded by Henry Drummond; William Denison	Member of Parliament for Western Surrey; 1849–1857; With: Henry Drummond	Succeeded by Henry Drummond; John Ivatt Briscoe
New constituency	Member of Parliament for Deptford; 1885 – 1888	Succeeded by Charles Darling
