= John Trotter (MP) =

British politician

Member of Parliament for West Surrey
- In office 31 July 1840 – 6 August 1847 Serving with William Joseph Denison
- Preceded by: William Joseph Denison; George Perceval
- Succeeded by: William Joseph Denison; Henry Drummond

Personal details
- Born: 1780 London, England
- Died: 31 August 1856 (aged 75–76) Horton Place, Epsom, Surrey
- Party: Conservative

John Trotter (died 1856) was a British Conservative politician.

He was elected Conservative MP for West Surrey at a by-election in 1840 caused by the succession of George Perceval to the peerage. He held the seat until 1847 when he did not seek re-election.

He died on 31 August 1856, aged 77 at the family home, Horton Manor, Epsom.

Parliament of the United Kingdom
Preceded by William Joseph Denison; George Perceval	Member of Parliament for West Surrey; 1840–1847; With: William Joseph Denison	Succeeded by William Joseph Denison; Henry Drummond
