= Lalmohan Ghosh =

Indian politician (1849–1909)

Lalmohan Ghosh (1849 – 18 October 1909) was the nineteenth President of the Indian National Congress and Bengali barrister and also Co-Founder of Indian National Congress.

== Early life ==
He was born in Krishnagar, West Bengal in 1849, the second son of Ramolochan Ghose, gentleman. After passing the Entrance examination in the first division, Ghosh left for England in 1869 to qualify as a barrister. He was admitted to the Middle Temple on 19 November 1870 and was Called to the Bar on 7 June 1873, joining the Calcutta Bar in that same year. His elder brother Monomohun Ghose was also a barrister and well known political personality of India.

== Political career ==
Ghosh was elected president of the Madras session (1903) of the Indian National Congress.

His social and political ideals were derived mostly from the liberal humanism of Victorian England. He strongly believed the importance of Western education for the people of India as a force to unite the people into one nation and he pleaded for compulsory primary education in India in his presidential address at the Madras session of the Congress. Ghosh never thought of a severance of relation between England and India, but he also believed that it was necessary to acquire by constitutional means, rights for Indians to the British type rules of law and justice, to free expression of opinion, to opportunities of trade and service, and to democratic legislative institutions.

In 1885 and 1886, Ghosh stood as the Liberal candidate for the parliamentary constituency of Deptford, London. Although he was unsuccessful in his attempt, he became the first Indian to stand for election to the British Parliament.

== Death ==
Lalmohan Ghosh died on 18 October 1909 in Kolkata.
