= Arthur Henry Aylmer Morton =

British clergyman, schoolteacher, and politician

- Born: 31 December 1835
- Died: 15 June 1913 (aged 77); London, England
- Spouse: Evelyn Wilson-Todd (m. 1903)

Arthur Henry Aylmer Morton (31 December 1835 – 15 June 1913) was a British clergyman, schoolteacher and Conservative Party politician.

The second son of Edward Morton of Kensington Gate, Hyde Park, London, he was educated at Eton College where he was a member of the 1854 Eton XI cricket team. In 1854 he was admitted to King's College, Cambridge, where he took Classical Honours, graduating Bachelor of Arts in 1859 and Master of Arts in 1862. In 1857 he was elected a Fellow of King's College, subsequently becoming bursar in 1870–1871 and Senior dean of the college in 1871–1872.

Morton was ordained as a Church of England deacon in 1861 and as a priest in 1863. He was appointed curate of the All Saints, Knightsbridge and of the Curzon Chapel, Mayfair.

Following graduation he initially worked as a tutor at Eton. He was tutor to Viscount Macduff, later Duke of Fife. In 1881 he became the duke's chaplain. From 1872–1886 he was headmaster of a preparatory school in Farnborough, Hampshire. In June 1891 he resigned from the Anglican Ministry under the terms of the Clerical Disabilities Act 1870 (33 & 34 Vict. c. 91).

A Unionist in politics, he unsuccessfully contested the parliamentary seats of Leeds East in 1892 and North Manchester in 1895. From 1895–1898 he was a member of the London County Council, representing Rotherhithe as a member of the Conservative-backed Moderate Party.

In 1897 the sitting member of parliament for Deptford, Charles Darling, was appointed a judge of the Queen's Bench Division. This required him to vacate his seat, and Morton was chosen by the Conservative Party to contest the ensuing by-election. Morton was elected and held the seat until 1906. In 1904 he was appointed an ecclesiastical commissioner.

Morton married at Christ Church, Mayfair, on 4 February 1903, Evelyn Wilson-Todd, daughter of fellow Conservative political Sir William Wilson-Todd of Halnaby Hall, Yorkshire, MP for Howdenshire. He divided his time between residences in Scotland (at North Berwick until his marriage and at Balabraes House, Ayton, Berwickshire thereafter), and Eaton Place in London.

He died at his London home in June 1913, aged 77.

Parliament of the United Kingdom
Preceded by Charles Darling	Member of Parliament for Deptford; 1897–1906	Succeeded by C. W. Bowerman
