= 1963 Deptford by-election =

UK Parliamentary by-election

The 1963 Deptford by-election was held on 4 July 1963 following the death of the incumbent Labour MP Sir Leslie Plummer on 15 April. The seat was comfortably retained by the future Cabinet Member John Silkin.

Deptford by-election, 1963
Party	Candidate	Votes	%	±%
Labour	John Silkin	12,209	58.25	−3.70
Liberal	David John Howard Penwarden	4,726	22.55	N/A
Conservative	John D Brimacombe	4,023	19.20	−18.85
Majority		7,483	35.70	+11.80
Turnout		20,958		
Labour hold		Swing		
