= Beatrice Plummer, Baroness Plummer =

British peeress

Beatrice Plummer, Baroness Plummer (14 April 1903 - 13 June 1972) was a British peeress.

== Family ==
She was the daughter of Meyer Lapsker and in 1923 married Sir Leslie Plummer. She and her husband both held titles in their own right.

== Career ==
Beatrice Plummer was a Justice of the Peace for Essex from 1947 and was created a life peer as Baroness Plummer, of Toppesfield in the County of Essex on 10 May 1965. She was one of the first Jews to be made a life peer. She was a member of the Independent Television Authority, 1966–1971 and of the British Agricultural Export Council.
