= Charles Darling, 1st Baron Darling =

English lawyer and politician

The Right Honourable The Lord Darling PC
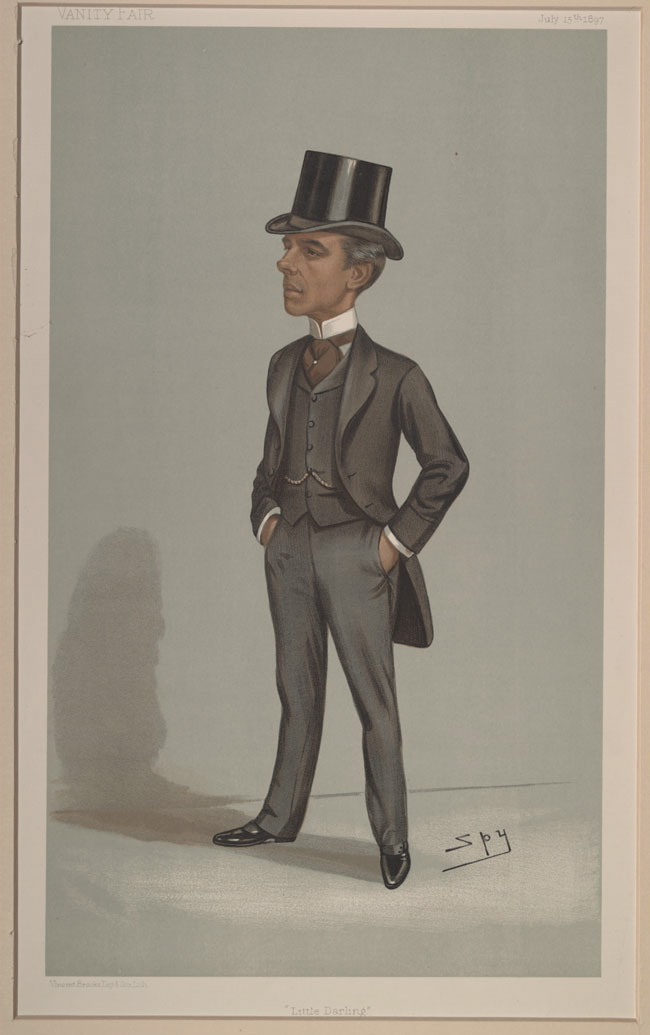
- "Little Darling" Darling as caricatured by Spy (Leslie Ward) in Vanity Fair, July 1897

Justice of the High Court
- In office 1897–1923

Member of Parliament for Deptford
- In office 1888–1897

Member of the House of Lords
- Lord Temporal
- Hereditary peerage 12 January 1924 – 28 May 1936

Personal details
- Born: 6 December 1849 Abbey House, Colchester, UK
- Died: 29 May 1936 (aged 86) Lymington, Hampshire, UK
- Party: Conservative

Charles John Darling, 1st Baron Darling, PC (6 December 1849 – 29 May 1936) was an English lawyer, politician and High Court judge.

== Early life and career ==
Darling was born in Abbey House in Colchester, the eldest son of Charles Darling and Sarah Frances (Tizard) Darling. Of delicate health, he was educated privately. Under the patronage of his uncle William Menelaus, he was articled with a firm of solicitors in Birmingham, before entering the Inner Temple as a student in 1872. After reading in the chambers of the pleader John Welch, Darling was called to the bar in 1874. He then devilled for John Huddleston (later Baron Huddleston) and joined the Oxford circuit. Although he took silk in 1885 he was never prominent at the bar and practised almost entirely within his own circuit. He combined his legal career with journalism, and contributed to the St. James's Gazette, the Pall Mall Gazette, and the Saturday Review.

After unsuccessfully contesting Hackney South as a Conservative in 1885 and 1886, Darling was returned for Deptford in a by-election in 1888, defeating Wilfrid Scawen Blunt, and held the seat until his elevation to the bench in 1897.

His time in the House of Commons was said to be undistinguished. He mainly spoke on legal issues and Irish Home Rule, and was said to have never entered the House of Commons Smoking Room on the grounds that he did not smoke.

In 1896, Darling was appointed commissioner of assize for the Oxford circuit. The Liberal opposition accused him of having vacated his seat by accepting an office of profit under the Crown, but Darling was able to point out that he accepted no payment.

== Judicial career ==
Darling was appointed a Justice of the High Court in 1897, and received the customary knighthood. The appointment had been made at the recommendation of the Lord Chancellor Lord Halsbury, who was known to let political considerations influence his choice of judges, and was widely condemned as political. The Times commented that although he possessed "acute intellect and considerable literary power", he had given "no sign of legal eminence".

Assigned to the Queen's Bench Division, Darling presided over a number of important trials, including the Stinie Morrison case (1911), that of "Chicago May", and the trial for criminal libel of Noel Pemberton Billing MP (1918), brought by Maud Allan after Billing and Harold Sherwood Spencer had claimed there were 47,000 "sexual perverts" in high places who were controlled by the Germans. He also sat on the criminal appeals of Hawley Crippen and Roger Casement, both of which he dismissed.

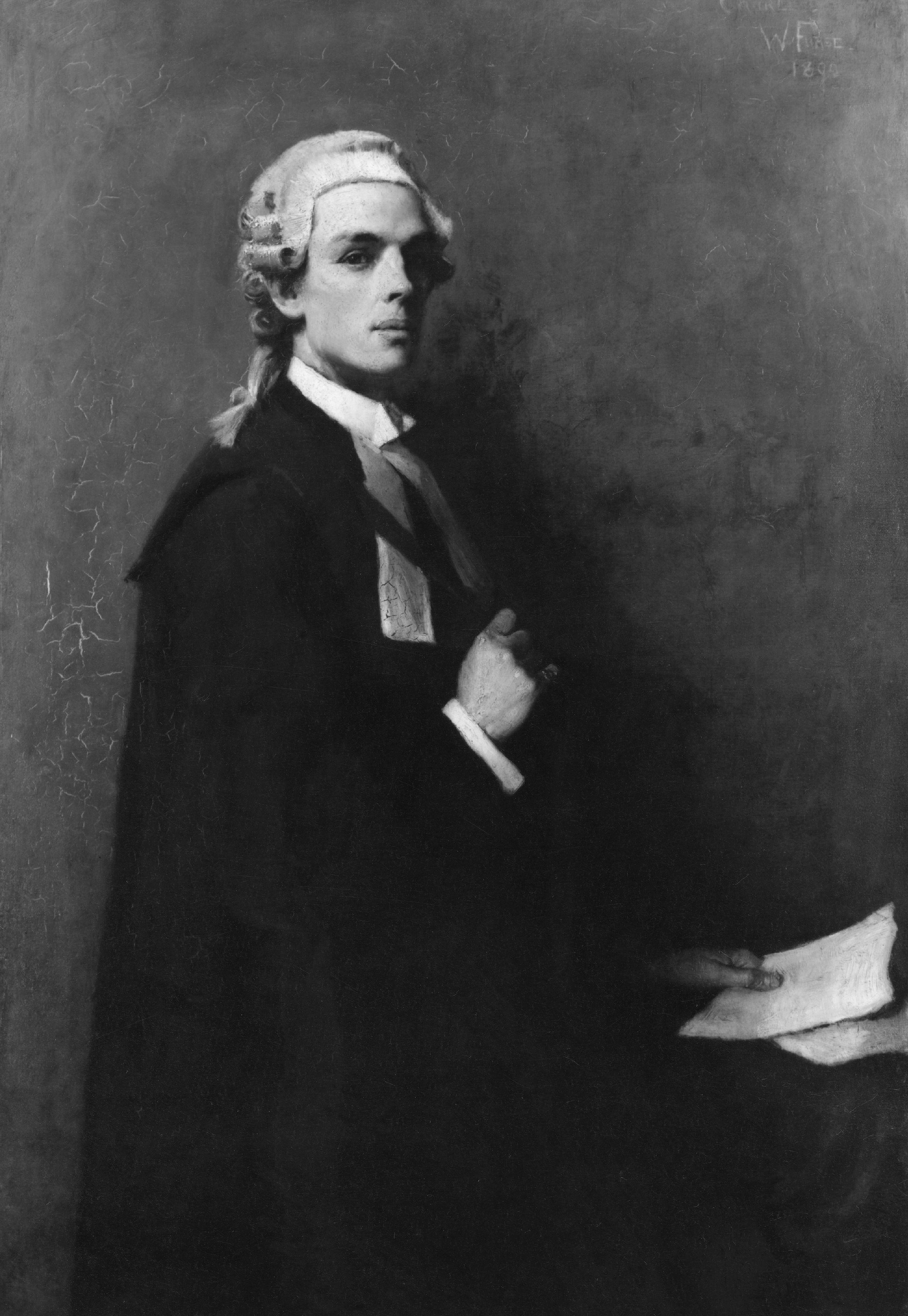
Charles John Darling, 1st Baron Darling, by Charles Wellington Furse

He was known for his erudition and at times inappropriate wit, both on and off the bench, as well as for being impeccably dressed and wearing a silk top hat whilst riding to Court on a horse and accompanied by a liveried groom. He displayed his literary acuity in a book of essays Scintillae Juris. The novelist and barrister F. C. Philips gave his opinion, 'I think that the wittiest book ever written by a legal luminary was one called "Scintillæ Juris" by Mr. Justice Darling, when he was a barrister on the Oxford Circuit. I understand that when he was raised to the Bench he stopped its circulation.'

During the Billing trial one of the witnesses, Eileen Villiers-Stuart, claimed to have seen the mysterious "Black Book" in which the names of the "perverts" were listed, declared in court that Darling was one of them. She was later convicted of bigamy, and admitted that her testimony was invented.

During the First World War, Lord Reading, the Lord Chief Justice, was frequently absent on diplomatic business. As the Senior Puisne Judge in the King's Bench Division, Darling deputized for him, and was sworn of the Privy Council in 1917 as a reward. In 1922, he was mooted as a stop-gap Lord Chief Justice until Sir Gordon Hewart could be appointed. Darling went so far as to write to Hewart asking for the office "even for ten minutes", but was passed over in favour of Mr Justice A. T. Lawrence. On hearing the news he was said to have remarked that he supposed he was not old enough (Darling being then 71 to Lawrence's age 77).

He retired from the bench in 1923, and was created Baron Darling, of Langham in the County of Essex on 12 January 1924 by King George V. In retirement he spoke in the Lords on legal issues and sat in the Judicial Committee of the Privy Council. He also sometimes sat in the King's Bench Division to deal with its arrears. He died at the Cottage Hospital, Lymington, Hampshire, on 29 May 1936 aged 86, and was succeeded as Baron Darling by his grandson, Robert Charles Henry Darling, his only son having predeceased him.

== Family ==
Darling married Mary Caroline Greathed (d. 1913) on 16 September 1885. She was the daughter of Major-General William Wilberforce Harris Greathed and Alice Clive. They had one son and two daughters.

== Arms ==
Coat of arms of Charles Darling, 1st Baron Darling
| Crest In front of a dexter cubit arm Proper holding in the hand a heart Gules a chaplet of laurel Vert over the crest the motto Dei Donum. Escutcheon Argent on a chevron engrailed between three fleshpots Sable a stirrup leathered Or. Supporters On either side a pegasus Argent charged on the wing with a chevron engrailed Sable. Motto Aye Be Honest Badge A sprig of heather and a sprig of gorse in saltire Proper engiled by a baron’s coronet Or. |

== Bibliography ==
- Peter James Rainton and Peerage. com.
- Smith, Derek Walter, "The Life of Charles Darling", Cassell & Co, London (1938).
- Simpson, A.W.B., "A Biographical Dictionary of the Common Law", Butterworths, London, 1984, p 143.
- Hoare, Philip, "Wilde's Last Stand", Duckworth Overlook, London 1997, 2011, pp 112–181, 217-218 (concerning the Pemberton Billing trial).
- Gilbert, Michael (ed), "The Oxford Book of Legal Anecdotes", OUP, Oxford, 1986, pp 91–97.

Parliament of the United Kingdom
| Preceded by William John Evelyn | Member of Parliament for Deptford; 1888–1897 | Succeeded by Arthur Henry Aylmer Morton |
Peerage of the United Kingdom
| New creation | Baron Darling; 1924–1936 | Succeeded by Robert Charles Henry Darling |
