= 1870 West Surrey by-election =

UK Parliamentary by-election

The 1870 West Surrey by-election was fought on 8 September 1870. The by-election was fought due to the death of the incumbent Liberal MP John Ivatt Briscoe. It was won by the unopposed Conservative candidate Lee Steere. It was retained by the Conservatives in the 1874 general election.
