= John Leach (MP) =

British politician (died 1847)

John Leach, also known as John Leech (died 16 April 1847) was a British politician.

Leach lived at Lea in Surrey. He was a trustee of the Agricultural Employment Institution. At the 1832 UK general election, he stood for the Whigs in West Surrey, winning a seat. In Parliament, he argued in favour of the Corn Laws, and for reform of the church, in order to equalise the income of the various bishops. He served until the 1835 UK general election, when he stood down.
