= William Joseph Denison =

English banker, politician and landowner

William Joseph Denison, MP
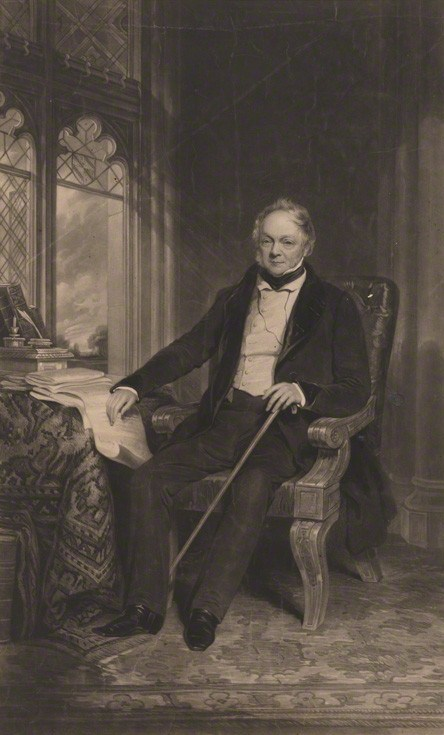
- Print of an engraving of Denison by William Giller, after Frederick Richard Say.

Member of Parliament
- In office 1796–1802 Serving with John Angerstein
- Preceded by: William Smith
- Succeeded by: Robert Adair
- Constituency: Camelford
- In office 1806–1807 Serving with John Staniforth
- Preceded by: Samuel Thornton
- Succeeded by: Philip Stanhope
- Constituency: Kingston–upon–Hull
- In office 1818–1832 Serving with: George Holme Sumner (1818–1826); Charles Nicholas Pallmer (1826–1830); John Ivatt Briscoe (1830–1832)
- Preceded by: Samuel Thornton
- Succeeded by: Constituency divided
- Constituency: Surrey
- In office 1832–1849 Serving with: John Leech or Leach (1832–1835); Charles Barclay (1835–1837); George Perceval (1837–1840); John Trotter (1840–1847); Henry Drummond (1847–1849)
- Preceded by: New constituency
- Succeeded by: William John Evelyn
- Constituency: West Surrey

Personal details
- Born: 12 May 1769 West Yorkshire
- Died: 2 August 1849 (aged 80) Pall Mall, London
- Resting place: Bunhill Fields
- Party: Whig
- Spouse: None
- Children: None
- Parent: Joseph Denison (father)
- Relatives: Elizabeth, Marchioness Conyngham (sister); Anna Maria, Baroness Wenlock (sister)
- Occupation: Banker; Politician; Landowner
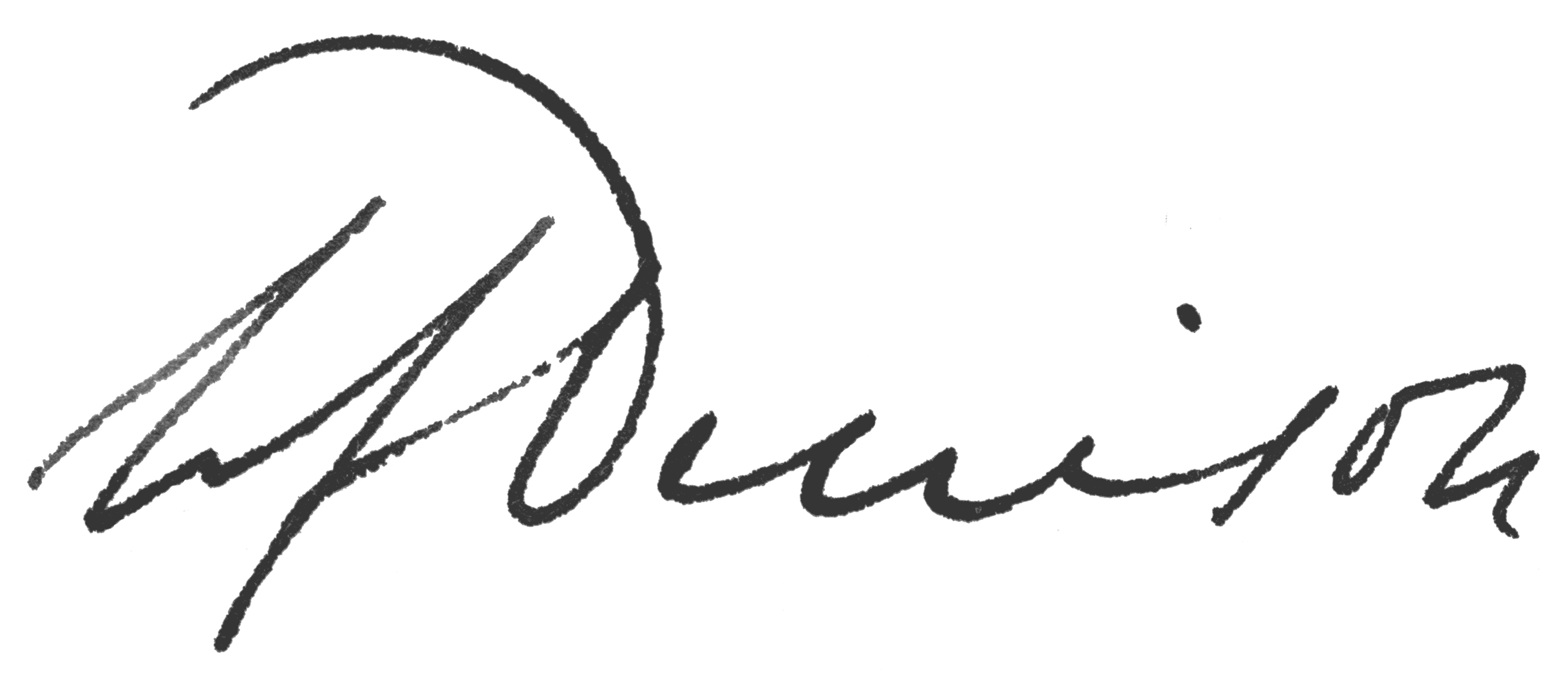
- Signature

William Joseph Denison (12 May 1769 – 2 August 1849), son of Joseph Denison (c. 1726 – 1806), was an English banker, politician, landowner, and philanthropist.

== Biography ==
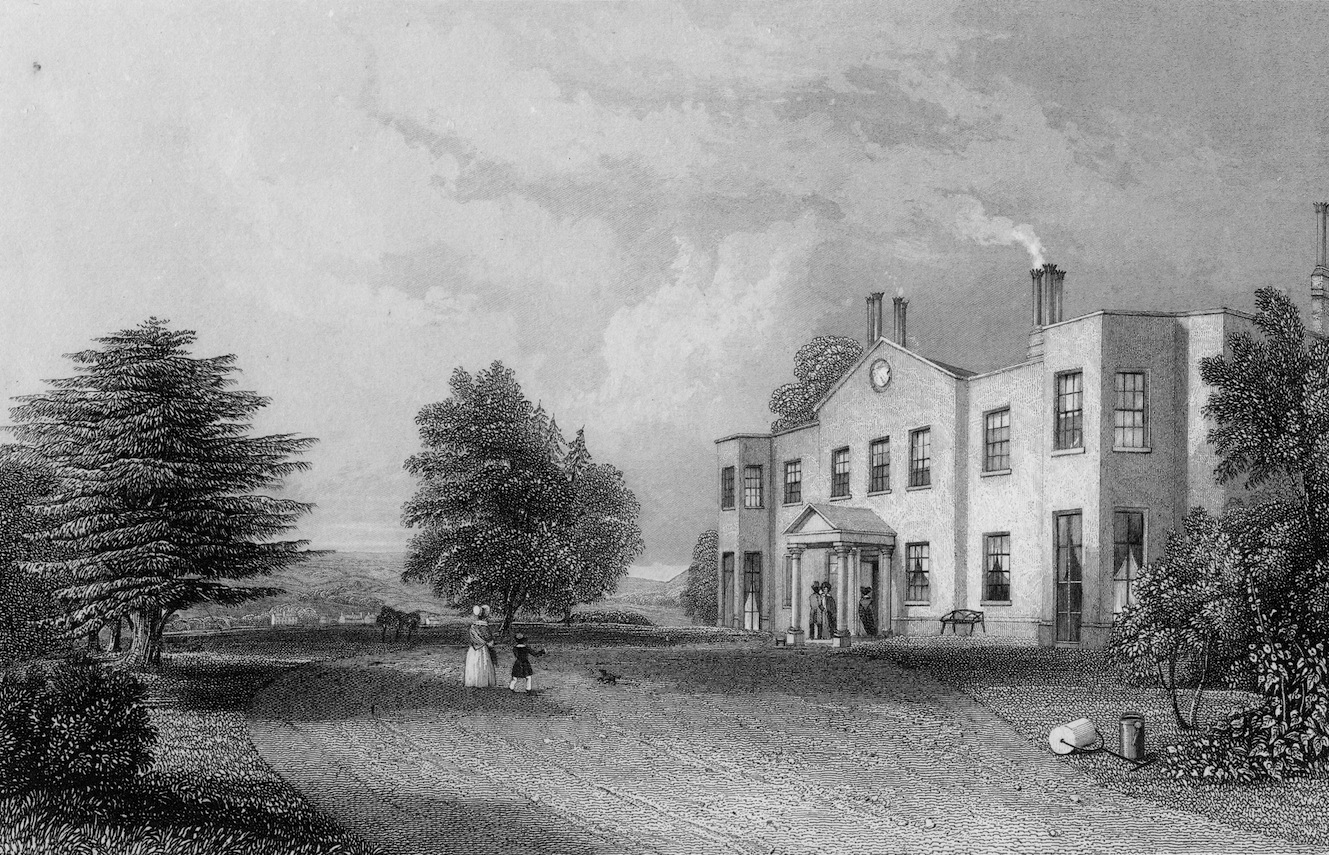
Denison's house on his Denbies estate, c. 1840.

William was born in Princes Street, Lothbury, the only son of Joseph Denison (1726?–1806), who had gone to London from the west of Yorkshire at an early age and amassed a fortune.

William was a highly successful banker and became a senior partner in the firm of Denison, Heywood, & Kennard (based in Lombard Street, London). He also had a long political career, first serving as a Whig MP for Camelford between 1796 and 1802. In 1806 he was elected to the constituency of Kingston upon Hull, and represented Surrey from 1818 until 1832. Following the passing of the Reform Act 1832 (2 & 3 Will. 4. c. 45), he was returned as an MP for the newly created constituency of West Surrey, then held the seat for the remainder of his life.

Upon the death of his father in 1806, Denison acquired estates in Yorkshire (Seamer, south of Scarborough) and Surrey (Denbies, near Dorking). During the course of his lifetime, he extended the boundaries of the latter considerably through the purchase of adjoining land from both the Duke of Norfolk and the Earl of Verulam. Denison also increased the size of his financial inheritance to such an extent that, following his death in Pall Mall, London, on 2 August 1849, the gross value of his estate was an estimated £2,300,000 (equivalent to around £184 million in 2017). He was selected High Sheriff of Yorkshire for 1808/09. Having never married, virtually all of his estate passed to his nephew, Lord Albert Conyngham, on condition that he take the surname Denison.

According to the records of The General Cemetery Company (incorporated by act of Parliament in 1832), Denison is buried in plot 8304 at Kensal Green Cemetery.
