= John Ivatt Briscoe =

British politician

Member of Parliament for Surrey
- In office 1830–1832

Member of Parliament for East Surrey
- In office 1832–1835

Member of Parliament for Westbury
- In office 1837–1841

Member of Parliament for West Surrey
- In office 1857–1870

Personal details
- Born: 12 October 1791
- Died: 16 August 1870 (aged 78)
- Party: Whig, Liberal
- Spouse: Anna Maria Mawbey
- Parent(s): John Briscoe & Mary Winthrop
- Education: University College, Oxford, Lincoln's Inn

John Ivatt Briscoe (12 October 1791 – 16 August 1870) was an English Whig and later Liberal politician who sat in the House of Commons from 1857 to 1870.

== Early life and education ==
Briscoe was the only son of John Briscoe of Cross Deep, Twickenham and his wife Mary Winthrop, daughter of Stephen Winthrop. He inherited the family home, Cross Deep House in 1809. He was educated at University College, Oxford and graduated BA 2nd class in classics in 1812 and MA in 1815. He entered as a student at Lincoln's Inn, but was not called to the bar. Briscoe married Anna Maria Mawbey, daughter of Sir Joseph Mawbey, 2nd Baronet, in 1819.

== Judicial career ==
He was a Deputy Lieutenant and J.P. for Surrey and a J.P. for Middlesex. He wrote a pamphlet on "Prison Discipline."

== Parliamentary career ==
At the 1830 general election Briscoe was elected as a Member of Parliament (MP) for Surrey. He held the seat until it was divided under the Reform Act, and was then elected at the 1832 general election as an MP for East Surrey, but was defeated at the 1835 election. He was returned to the Commons at the next general election, in 1837 as the MP for Westbury, where he defeated the sitting Conservative MP Sir Ralph Lopes by 98 votes to 96. He held that seat until the general election in June 1841, when he did not contest the seat. Briscoe did not stand for Parliament again until the 1857 general election, when he was elected as an MP for West Surrey. He held the seat until his death aged 78 in 1870.

== Legacy ==
He upkept and improved Foxhills which he inherited through marriage, from an 11-year owner and neighbouring friend, purchaser of its eponymous owner Charles James Fox (d. 1806). His will in rounded bands, left "less than" £180,000 (equivalent to about £18,500,000 in 2025). Its execution in 1870 confirms he died 'late of' Foxhills, Chertsey and Eaton Place (Belgravia).

== Bibliography ==
- Craig, F. W. S. (1989) [1977]. British parliamentary election results 1832–1885 (2nd ed.). Chichester: Parliamentary Research Services. ISBN 0-900178-26-4.

Parliament of the United Kingdom
Preceded by Charles Pallmer; William Joseph Denison	Member of Parliament for Surrey; 1830 – 1832; With: William Joseph Denison	Constituency abolished
New constituency	Member of Parliament for East Surrey; 1832 – 1835; With: Aubrey Beauclerk	Succeeded by Richard Alsager; Aubrey Beauclerk
Preceded by Sir Ralph Lopes, Bt	Member of Parliament for Westbury; 1837 – 1841	Succeeded by Sir Ralph Lopes, Bt
Preceded by William Evelyn; Henry Drummond	Member of Parliament for West Surrey; 1857 – 1870; With: Henry Drummond to 1860; George Cubitt from 1860	Succeeded by Lee Steere; George Cubitt
