= David Pigot =

David Pigot may refer to:

- David Pigot (cricketer, born 1929) (1929–1996), Irish cricketer
- David Pigot (cricketer, born 1900) (1900–1965), Irish cricketer
- David Richard Pigot (1796–1873), Irish judge
