= James Pigot (cricketer) =

Irish cricketer

Personal information
- Full name: James Poole Maunsell Pigot
- Born: 31 January 1901; Dublin, Ireland
- Died: 20 July 1980 (aged 79); Glenageary, Leinster, Ireland
- Batting: Right-handed
- Bowling: Leg break googly
- Role: David Pigot, Sr. (brother); David Pigot, Jr. (nephew)

Domestic team information
- Years: Team
- 1925/26–1929/30: Europeans
- 1924–1925: Dublin University

Career statistics
Competition	First-class
Matches	5
Runs scored	67
Batting average	8.37
100s/50s	–/1
Top score	50
Balls bowled	222
Wickets	4
Bowling average	46.00
5 wickets in innings	–
10 wickets in match	–
Best bowling	3/71
Catches/stumpings	3/–
- Source: ESPNcricinfo, 6 November 2018

James Poole Maunsell Pigot (31 January 1901 – 20 July 1980) was an Irish first-class cricketer.

Pigot was born at Dublin to Alice Maud Knox, and her husband, John Henry Pigot, who would serve as president of the Irish Cricket Union from 1925–1928. He studied at Trinity College, Dublin, where he was member of Dublin University Cricket Club. He made his debut in first-class cricket for Dublin University against Northamptonshire at Rushden on their 1924 tour of England. He toured England with the university the following year, playing a further first-class match against Northamptonshire at Northampton. He moved to British India shortly after, playing first-class cricket in January 1926 in the 1925–26 Madras Presidency for the Europeans against the Indians at Madras. He made two further first-class appearances for the Europeans against the same opponents in the 1928–29 Madras Presidency and 1929–30 Madras Presidency. Playing a total of five first-class matches, he scored 67 runs at an average of 8.37, with a highest score of 50. This score came against Northamptonshire in 1925. With his leg break googly bowling, he took 4 wickets at a bowling average of 46.00, with best innings figures of 3/71. Pigot was still living in British India during World War II. He was made an emergency commission in the British Indian Army in June 1942. Returning to Ireland at some point after the war, he died at Glenageary in July 1980. His brother, David Pigot Sr., and nephew, David Pigot Jr., also played first-class cricket. His great-grandfather was the judge David Richard Pigot.
