= Attorney General Ball =

Attorney General Ball may refer to:

- Byron D. Ball, Michigan Attorney General from 1873 to 1874
- John Thomas Ball (1815–1898), Attorney-General for Ireland
- Nicholas Ball (lawyer) (1791–1865), Attorney-General for Ireland
