= David Pigot (cricketer, born 1929) =

Irish cricketer

Personal information
- Full name: David Richard Pigot
- Born: 18 July 1929; Dublin, Leinster, Ireland
- Died: 8 June 1996 (aged 66); Dublin, Leinster, Ireland
- Batting: Right-handed
- Bowling: Right-arm off break
- Relatives: David Pigot, Sr. (father); James Pigot (uncle)

Domestic team information
- Years: Team
- 1966–1975: Ireland

Career statistics
| Competition | First-class |
|---|---|
| Matches | 11 |
| Runs scored | 406 |
| Batting average | 19.33 |
| 100s/50s | –/1 |
| Top score | 88 |
| Catches/stumpings | 8/– |
- Source: Cricinfo, 27 October 2018

David Richard Pigot (18 July 1929 – 8 June 1996) was an Irish first-class cricketer.

Pigot was born at Dublin to Meta Violet Blood-Smyth, and her husband, the cricketer David Pigot, Sr. He was educated in Dublin at Blackrock College, before going up to Trinity College, Dublin. After completing his studies, he worked as a partner in the legal firm Arthur Cox & Company.

Playing his club cricket for Phoenix, at the age of 36 he debuted for Ireland in July 1966 in a minor match against Middlesex. Later that month he made his debut in first-class cricket against Scotland at Edinburgh. He opened the batting for Ireland over the next decade, making eleven appearances in first-class cricket, with his last match coming aged 46 against Scotland at Dublin. He scored 406 runs in first-class cricket, averaging 19.33, with a high score of 88. This score, one of two half centuries he made, came against Scotland in 1970. He played club cricket in Dublin for 45 years, scoring 14,423 runs in Leinster Senior League cricket, a record only exceeded by Ginger O'Brien.

He died following a short battle with cancer at Dublin in June 1996. He was buried at Glasnevin Cemetery. His great great grandfather was the judge David Richard Pigot, while his grandfather, John Henry Pigot, was the president of the Irish Cricket Union from 1925–1928.
