= Kilworth =

Village in County Cork, Ireland

Kilworth Irish: Cill Uird
- Village
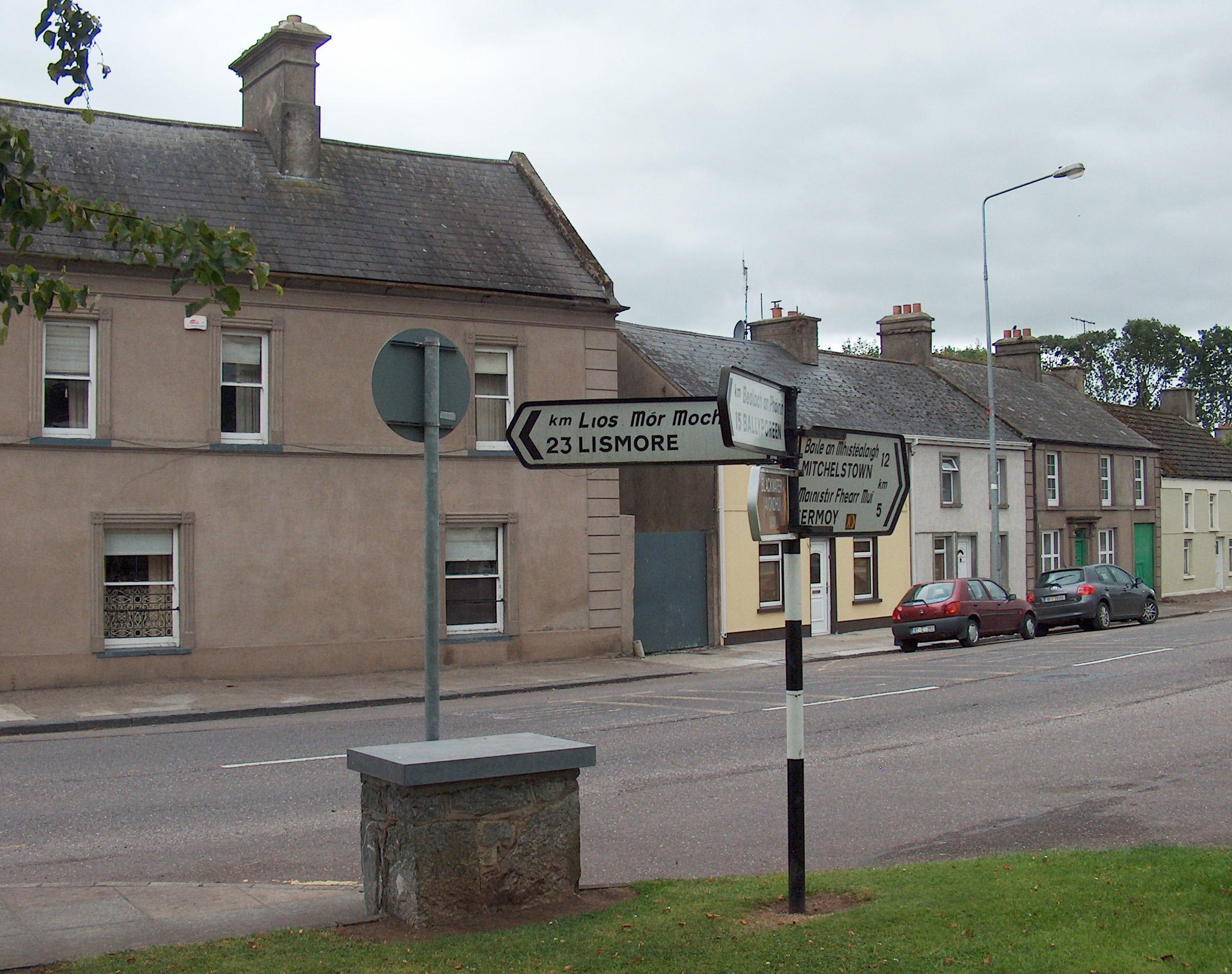
- Main Street

- Location in Ireland
- Coordinates: 52°10′35″N 8°14′39″W
- Country: Ireland
- Province: Munster
- County: Cork
- Elevation: 72 m (236 ft)

Population (2022)
  - Total: 1,179
- Time zone: UTC+0 (WET)
  - Summer (DST): UTC-1 (IST (WEST))
- Irish Grid Reference: R833027

Kilworth (Irish: Cill Uird) is a village in north County Cork, Ireland, located about 2 km (1.2 mi) north of Fermoy near the River Funshion. The M8 Cork–Dublin motorway passes nearby. Kilworth has an army camp, located on the R639 regional road between Mitchelstown and Fermoy. The village is in a townland and civil parish of the same name. Kilworth is part of the Cork East Dáil constituency.

== History ==
The name Kilworth comes from the Irish language term Cill Uird, literally meaning 'church of the order'. In the seventeenth and eighteenth centuries, Kilworth was a notable settlement on the old Dublin to Cork road, prior to the construction of the T6/old N8/R639 road from Fermoy to Cashel and from Cashel to Urlingford between 1739 and the mid-nineteenth century. Numerous accounts and maps dating from the 1680s tell of armies and travellers journeying from Fermoy to Clogheen and onwards to Dublin via Kilworth and Kilworth Mountain.

== Amenities and attractions ==
Kilworth Arts centre is a theatre venue in the centre of the village. It was previously used as a church.

Kilworth (Glenseskin) forest is located about 1 km from the village centre.

== Economy ==
Teagasc has an agricultural research facility based at Moorepark, just outside Kilworth. The village is within commuting distance of many centres of employment, including Cork city.

== Notable people ==
- Redmond Barry (1813–1880), the colonial judge who sentenced Ned Kelly in Australia, was from Ballyclogh House near Kilworth.
- David Richard Pigot (c.1796–1873), judge who was Chief Baron of the Irish Exchequer. His eldest son, John Edward Pigot, was also born in Kilworth and was one of the founders of the National Gallery of Ireland.
- Gearoid Towey (born 1977), three-time Olympian, attended primary school in Kilworth and has a monument in the village commemorating his 2001 World Championship victory.

== See also ==
- List of towns and villages in Ireland
