= John Edward Pigot =

Irish music collector

- Born: 1822; Kilworth, County Cork
- Died: 1871 (aged 48–49)
- Father: David Richard Pigot

John Edward Pigot (1822–1871) was an Irish music collector and lawyer, who played a key role in the foundation of the National Gallery of Ireland.

== Life ==
Pigot was born in Kilworth, County Cork, the eldest son of the Chief Baron of the Irish Exchequer, David Richard Pigot and his wife Catherine Page. He became friendly with Thomas Davis and Charles Gavan Duffy of the Young Ireland movement. They published advertisements in The Nation asking those who had Irish tunes to send them in. This started the Pigot Collection. He studied for the Bar in London and while there met Patrick McDowel. He was an avid collector and gave Pigot many tunes which he added to among the Irish in London.

While in London, Pigot and Duffy paid a call on Thomas Carlyle and his wife Jane Carlyle in April 1845 in order to defend the Irish and Irish Nationalism against Carlyle's attacks in On Chartism and other works. In his 1892 Conversations with Carlyle, Duffy recounts this initial meeting and quotes from Jane Carlyle's half-burnt diary that had been rescued from a general fire meant to destroy all of her personal memoirs. Here Jane commented on meeting for the first time "real hot and hot live Irishmen" such as she had "never seen before" (J. Carlyle qtd. in Duffy, 1892, p. 1). Jane decides that Pigot, whom she found to be unusually handsome, was destined to be an Irish revolutionary martyr: "Mr. Pigot will rise to be a Robespierre of some sort; will cause many heads to be removed from the shoulders they belong to; and will 'eventually' have his own head removed ... Nature has written on that handsome but fatal-looking countenance of his, quite legibly to my prophetic eye, 'Go and get thyself beheaded, but not before having lent a hand towards the great work of immortal smash'" (ibid., pp. 3–4).

Jane Carlyle describes Pigot as: "a handsome youth of the romantic cast, pale-faced, with dark eyes and hair, and an 'Emancipation of Species' melancholy spread over him" (ibid., p. 2).

Pigot went to Bombay and practised at the Indian Bar returning to Ireland due to ill health in 1871. In all, Pigot collected over 2,000 airs. The collection was held by Dublin doctor Robert Lyons. Pigot's collection was included in the 1908 publication Old Irish Folk Music and Songs, by P. W. Joyce .

A memorandum written by Pigot in 1853 played a crucial role in the foundation of the National Gallery of Ireland, and he was appointed one of its first Governors.

== Bibliography ==
- M. W. Savage: The Falcon Family, or Young Ireland (London, 1845). (An Gorta Mor)Quinnipiac University
- Capt. W. F. Lyons: Brigadier-General Thomas Francis Meagher. His Political and Military Career (Burns Oates & Washbourne, 1869)
- T. C. Luby: Life and Times of Daniel O'Connell (Cameron, Ferguson & Co., 1870).
- P. A. Sillard: Life of John Martin (James Duffy & Co., 1901).
- James Connolly: Labour in Ireland (Fleet Street, 1910).
- James Connolly: The Re-Conquest of Ireland (Fleet Street, 1915).
- Arthur Griffith (ed.): Meagher of The Sword (M. H. Gill & Son, 1916).
- P. S. O'Hegarty: John Mitchel (Maunsel & Co., 1917).
- Arthur Griffith: Thomas Davis. The Thinker and Teacher (M. H. Gill & Son, 1922).
- Louis J. Walsh: John Mitchel. Noted Irish Lives (The Talbot Press, 1934).
- Seamus MacCall: Irish Mitchel (Thomas Nelson and Sons, 1938).
- Dennis Gwynn: Daniel O'Connell. The Irish Liberator (Hutchinson & Co.).
- Dennis Gwynn: Smith O'Brien and The 'Secession' (Cork University Press).
- Thomas Davis: Essays and Poems. Centenary Memoir (M. H Gill, 1945).
- T. F. O'Sullivan: Young Ireland (The Kerryman, 1945).
- Brian O'Higgins (ed.): John Mitchel. First Felon for Ireland (Brian O'Higgins, 1947).
- Dennis Gwynn: O'Connell, Davis, and the Colleges Bill (Cork University Press, 1948).
- Dennis Gwynn: Young Ireland and 1848 (Cork University Press, 1949).
- Thomas P. O'Neill: James Fintan Lalor (1962; reprint Golden Publications, 2003).
- Malcolm Brown: The Politics of Irish Literature: From Thomas Davis to W. B. Yeats (Allen & Unwin, 1973).
- T. A. Jackson: Ireland Her Own (Lawrence & Wishart, 1976).
- Thomas Gallagher: Paddy's Lament. Ireland 1846–1847: Prelude to Hatred (Poolbeg, 1994).
- R. V. Comerford: The Fenians in Context. Irish Politics & Society, 1848–82 (Wolfhound Press, 1998).
- Terry Golway: Irish Rebel John Devoy and America's Fight for Irish Freedom (St. Martin's Griffin, 1998).
- Thomas Keneally: The Great Shame (Anchor Books, 1999).
- Robert Sloan: William Smith O'Brien and the Young Ireland Rebellion of 1848 (Four Courts Press, 2000).
- Brendan O'Cathaoir: Young Irelander Abroad. The Diary of Charles Hart (Cork University Press, 2003).
- Jeremiah O’Donovan Rossa: Rossa's Recollections, 1838 to 1898 (The Lyons Press, 2004).
- Brendan Clifford: Charles Gavan Duffy: Conversations with Carlyle (1892), with Introduction, Stray Thoughts on Young Ireland (Athol Books, 2005), ISBN 0-85034-114-0.
- Aidan Hegarty: John Mitchel. A Cause Too Many (Camlane Press, 2005).
- Brendan Clifford and Julianne Herlih: Envoi. Taking Leave of Roy Foster, (Aubane Historical Society, 2006).
