= The King of the Golden River =

1851 fairy tale by John Ruskin

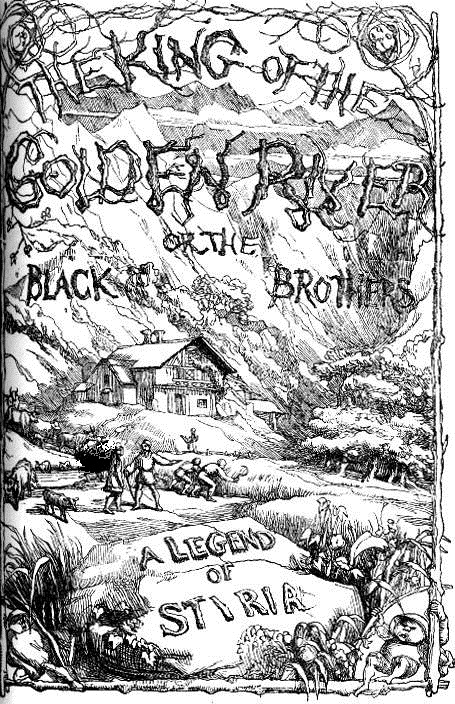
- Title page, designed by Richard Doyle
- Author: John Ruskin
- Illustrator: Richard Doyle; Arthur Rackham (1932)
- Cover artist: Richard Doyle; Arthur Rackham (1932)
- Language: English
- Genre: Fairy tale, fantasy, novel
- Publisher: Smith, Elder & Co. (1851)
- Publication date: 1842 (book publication 1851)
- Publication place: United Kingdom
- Media type: Print (hardback and paperback)
- Pages: 56 pp
- Text: The King of the Golden River at Wikisource

The King of the Golden River or The Black Brothers: A Legend of Stiria is a fantasy story originally written in 1841 by John Ruskin for the twelve-year-old Effie (Euphemia) Gray, whom Ruskin later married. It was published in book form in 1851, and became an early Victorian classic which sold out three editions. In the "Advertisement to the First Edition", which prefaces it, it is called a fairy tale, one, it might be added, that illustrates the triumph of love, kindness, and goodness over evil; however, it could also be characterised as a fable, a fabricated origin myth and a parable. It was illustrated with 22 illustrations by Richard Doyle (1824–1883). A later edition was illustrated by Arthur Rackham in 1932.

== Plot summary ==
The richness of the Treasure Valley, high in the mountains of Stiria or Styria, southeastern Austria, is lost through the evil of its owners, the two elder "Black Brothers", Hans and Schwartz, who in their foolishness mistreat Southwest Wind, Esquire, who in turn floods their valley, washing away their assets, and turning their valley into a dead valley of red sand.

This personified wind has the power to keep things this way through his influence with other winds that had caused the valley's unique fertility. Forced into a trade other than farming Hans and Schwartz become goldsmiths. They cruelly melt their younger brother Gluck's prize heirloom, a golden mug, which consists of the head of a golden-bearded man. This action releases the King of the Golden River for Gluck to pour out of the crucible as a finely dressed little golden dwarf. The Golden River is one of the high mountain cataracts that surround the Treasure Valley. Gluck fancies that it would be good if that high majestic river would actually be what it appears in the setting sun, a river of gold. The dwarfish king disagrees with Gluck, but offers a proposition: if someone were to climb up to the source of the river and throw into it at least three drops of holy water, it would become for that person only a river of gold. That person must do it on his first and only attempt or be overwhelmed by the river to become a black stone.

Hans and Schwartz desire to take the challenge, duel each other with the result that Schwartz is thrown into jail for disturbing the peace. Hans, who had the good sense to hide from the constable, steals holy water from the church and climbs up the mountains to the Golden River. He has a hard time of it on a glacier and gets away without his provisions and only his flask of holy water. Overcome with thirst, Hans is forced to drink from this flask, knowing that only three drops are all that's needed. Along the path, Hans comes across three prostrate individuals dying of thirst, a puppy, a fair child, and an old man. Hans satisfies his own thirst while denying the three needy individuals.

The surroundings on his journey turn bleak and inauspicious, climaxing in Hans being transformed into a black stone once he has hurled the holy water flask into the Golden River. Gluck secures the release of his brother Schwartz, who, buying his holy water from a "bad priest", eventually fares likewise, spurning in his turn the fair child, the old man, and his brother Hans lying prostrate in his path. The Golden River then acquires another black stone around which to rush and wail.

Gluck and the King of the Golden River, illustration to a later edition by John C. Johansen

Gluck takes a turn at climbing the mountain. He encounters first an old man walking down the mountain trail who begs water from the flask. Gluck allows him to drink, leaving only a third of the holy water. He then encounters a fair child, lying by the road, whom he allows to drink all but a few drops. Following these unselfish acts, Gluck's path is made bright and pleasant making him feel better than he had in his whole life—no doubt, due to his kindness. He then comes across the prostrate puppy, whom he gives the final drops of the holy water. The puppy turns into the King of the Golden River, who tells Gluck the reason for the deadly fate of his two brothers: the water they had thrown into the river was made unholy by their denying it to those dying of thirst on the way. Thereupon, he shakes three drops of dew from a lily into Gluck's flask to throw into the river and then vanishes by evaporation. Gluck throws the dew drops into the Golden River, and it forms a whirlpool where it goes underground and then emerges in the Treasure Valley. The Treasure Valley becomes lush and fertile once again. Gluck the new owner is a wealthy man, who never turns away the needy from his door. Ever afterwards, though, the people show and tell travellers the tale of the two black stones in the Golden River, known as The Black Brothers.

== Characters ==
- Schwartz – (his name means "black" in German), one of the two "Black Brothers". He and his brother Hans are described as very ugly men with overhanging eyebrows and small, "dull" eyes, which they kept half closed.
- Hans – (his name is the common "John" in German), the other of the two "Black Brothers". Both are cruel to both animals and people, and they enjoy nothing better than drinking out their last penny at the neighbouring alehouse.
- Gluck – (should be Glück; his name means "luck" or "happiness" in German; the name is a wish of "good luck": "G' Luck!"), the twelve-year-old kid brother of the "Black Brothers". In striking contrast to his elder brothers, he is blond-haired and blue-eyed and kindly disposed to all living things.
- Southwest Wind, Esquire – a personified wind, who visits the three brothers in the Treasure Valley. He stands about four feet, six inches, has a brass coloured nose and red cheeks that look like he had been blowing a refractory fire for 48 hours, silky eyelashes, and a moustache that curls twice around on each side of his face. He wears a conical hat that is almost as tall as he is, and a cloak that stretches about four times his height when blown by the wind. After his ill treatment by Hans & Schwartz, he—and the other winds—avoid Treasure Valley and cause it to become barren.
- The King of the Golden River – a golden dwarf entrapped by "a stronger king" as a golden heirloom mug in Gluck's possession, freed through the melting of the mug, king of the river that cascades from the cataracts surrounding the Treasure Valley.

== Structure and forces ==
This fairy tale also has the character of an aetiological myth—a story devised to explain why things are as they are in the world. It is structured like an epic saga with each of the chapters closing on one solitary curiosity: Chapter One, the card identifying Southwest Wind, Esquire; Chapter Two, the mug becoming a released King of the Golden River; Chapter Three, Hans becoming a black stone; Chapter Four, Schwartz becoming a companion black stone; and Chapter Five, the black stones being known as the "Black Brothers".

The Black Brothers

Another view is that of Oliver Lodge, editor, of the Everyman's Library edition of the work: "The parable is in two halves, a sort of Paradise Lost and a Paradise Regained—lost by selfishness, regained by love."

Water is the force that makes and unmakes things. The Treasure Valley never fails to have the proper watering to be perpetually lush. It is then destroyed by the water of a torrential flood. It is restored through the water of the Golden River becoming for the kindhearted Gluck a river of gold. Water's power appears in the treacherous glacier, which frightens those who traverse it with its sounds of rushing water and cracking ice. Water as "holy water" causes the miraculous transformation of the Golden River into a "river of gold" at the behest of the king. The King of the Golden River himself disappeared through the process of evaporation, a "water" phenomenon.

In this fairy tale the environment responds positively or negatively to human good or evil. There is the interplay of personified forces of nature like winds and rivers.

Lodge also enlightens us as to the lesson learned by the Black Brothers becoming goldsmiths and Gluck's wish that the Golden River become a literal river of gold: "And the restoration of wealth to Treasure Valley, by restoring the fertility of its soil instead of by metalliferous undertakings, is entirely in harmony with the author's consistent teaching that all true material increase must come from the soil". Note that the King of the Golden River was imprisoned through "metalliferous undertakings".

== Major themes ==
As stated above, this story could also be classed as a fable by which John Ruskin can impart to his readers that love, kindness, and philanthropy could transform the world as it did the Treasure Valley. No doubt, he speaks through the King of the Golden River when he tells Gluck: "the water which has been refused to the cry of the weary and dying is unholy, though it had been blessed by every saint in heaven; and the water which is found in the vessel of mercy is holy, though it had been defiled with corpses".
