= John Doyle (Irish artist) =

Irish artist

John Doyle (H. B.)
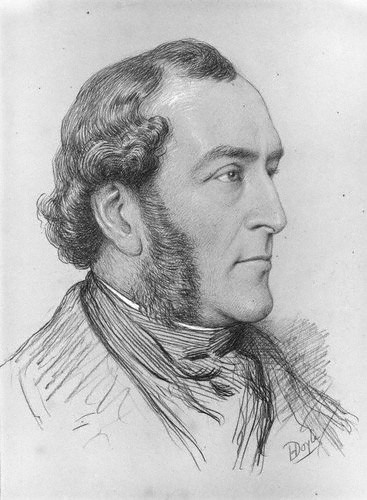
- John Doyle sketched in chalk by his son Henry Edward Doyle
- Born: 1797; Dublin, Ireland
- Died: 2 January 1868 (aged 70–71); London, England
- Education: Royal Dublin Society
- Known for: Political caricature, painting, lithography
- Spouse: Marianna Conan
- Children: 7, including James, Richard, Henry, and Charles

John Doyle (1797 – 2 January 1868), known by the pen name H. B., was an Irish political cartoonist, caricaturist, painter and lithographer.

== Early life and family ==
He was the eldest of two sons of a Dublin silk mercer, and came from a Roman Catholic family which in the 17th century had been granted extensive estates, possibly in County Offaly or County Laois, and their own coat of arms, but had suffered for their religion and since been dispossessed.

In his youth he learned to paint landscapes under Gaspare Gabrielli, and miniature portraits at the Royal Dublin Society's drawing school under John Comerford. He won a gold medal in 1805 from the Dublin Society. He was commissioned to paint equestrian portraits of the Marquess of Sligo and Lord Talbot, the Irish viceroy, and in 1822 he produced six prints entitled The Life of a Racehorse.

He moved to London with his wife, Marianna Conan, between 1817 and 1821 vowing not to return to a country that treated Catholics so badly. His painting Turning out the Stag brought him recognition when it was exhibited at the Royal Academy in 1825. The couple had five sons and two daughters. Marianna died in 1832, giving birth to their seventh child. After her death, Marianna's brother Michael and his wife moved into the Doyle family home to help raise the children.

== Career ==
Doyle continued to exhibit miniatures until 1835, but by then he was experiencing greater success with his political cartoons, printed using the new reproductive medium of lithography, beginning in 1827. These were issued once a month during parliamentary sessions, and continued for twenty-two years. His caricatures were mostly faithful likenesses of their subjects, with little exaggeration, treated with sarcastic humour, often alluding to popular plays. They were signed with the letters H. B., constructed out of two Js and two Ds, Doyle's own initials. By 1840 he was prosperous enough to afford a fashionable house in Hyde Park, moving in the same circles as David Wilkie, Walter Scott, Samuel Taylor Coleridge, Charles Dickens, William Makepeace Thackeray, Thomas Macaulay, Thomas Moore and Samuel Rogers – but H. B.'s true identity remained a closely guarded secret until he revealed it in 1843 in a seventeen-page letter to Sir Robert Peel.

In the 1840s, at the height of his popularity, indices of H.B.'s prints were published in The Times and by the publisher McLean, but his reputation faded. His later prints were gentle in their humour and drawn in a soft, indistinct style. Thackeray said his cartoons, although clever and witty, were too "genteel" to raise more than a gentlemanly smile – "You will never hear any laughing at 'H. B.'" When he died in 1868, his obituary in The Art Journal did not appear until three months after his death, and a posthumous sale of his sketches at Christie's in 1882 was cancelled for lack of buyers. However, he is considered a founder of the school of British cartoon satirists represented by John Leech, John Tenniel, and his son Richard, which established the style made famous by Punch magazine.

== Death and legacy ==
He died at his home in Maida Hill, 2 January 1868, and was buried at West Norwood Cemetery. His sons included the illustrator James William Edmund (1822–1892); the painter, illustrator and cartoonist Richard (1824–1883); Henry Edward (1827–1892), who became director of the National Gallery of Ireland, and the painter Charles Altamont (1832–1893), through whom he was a grandfather of Sir Arthur Conan Doyle, the novelist and creator of Sherlock Holmes. His son, Francis, was considered the most talented by the family, died around 1843. His daughters were Annette, and Adelaide. Adelaide died around 1844.

The British Museum has over 900 of his drawings in its collections.

== Gallery ==
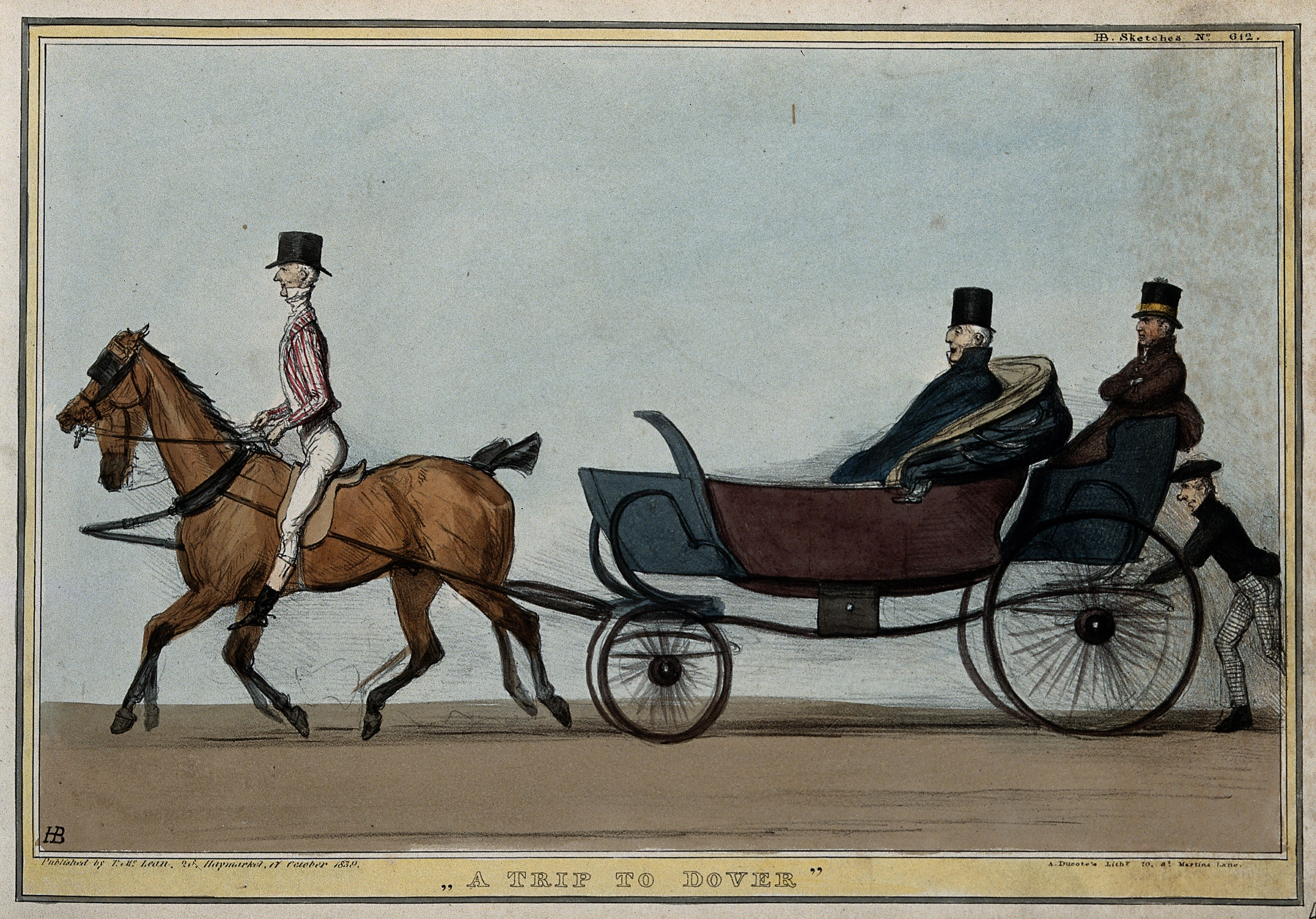
A trip to Dover, the Duke of Wellington and friends Sir Thomas Burdett, Lord Lyndhurst and Lord Brougham
17 October 1839

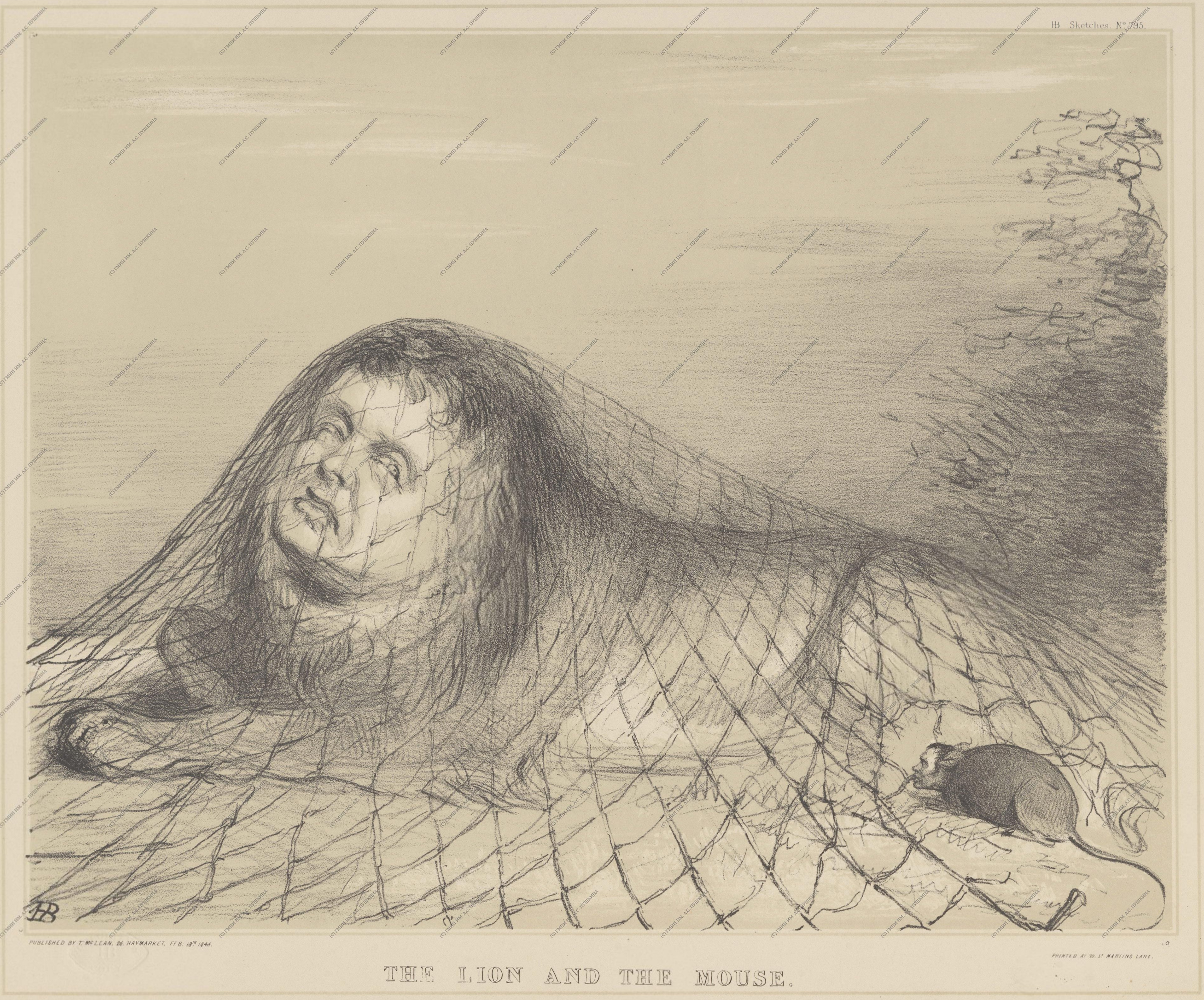
The lion and the mouse,
1844, depicting Daniel O'Connell and Lord John Russell, Pushkin Museum.

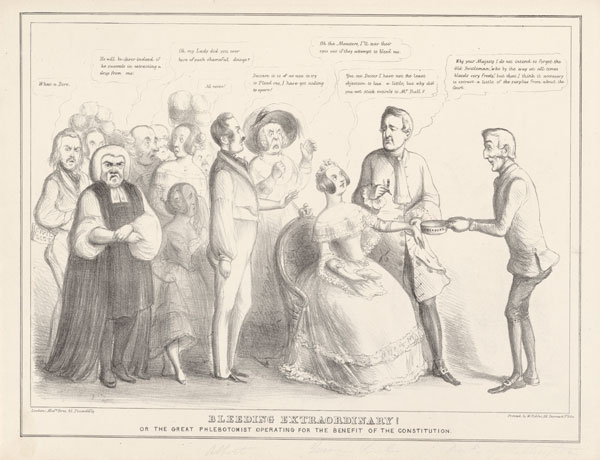
Bleeding extraordinary! Or the great phlebotomist operating for the benefit of the constitution,
1843, Pushkin Museum

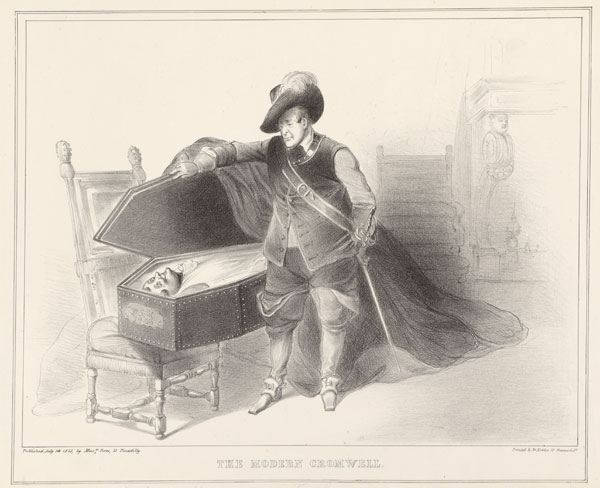
The modern Cromwell,
16 July 1843, Pushkin Museum
