= Frances Mary Teresa Ball =

Irish nun

Frances Mary Teresa Ball, IBVM (9 January 1794 – 19 May 1861) was an Irish Catholic religious sister who founded the Irish branch of the Institute of the Blessed Virgin Mary, better known as the Sisters of Loretto.

== Early life ==
Frances Ball was born on 9 January 1794 in Dublin, Ireland to John and Mable Clare Bennet Ball; the youngest of six children. Her father was a wealthy silk weaver. Catholicism was still suppressed in Ireland at this time, although her brother Nicholas later became one of the first Catholic Irish judges. She was therefore sent to England at the age of nine to the Bar Convent in York, which was an IBVM school, although Mary Ward was not acknowledged as the foundress. This sisterhood, which had long existed in York, was originally established on the continent in the seventeenth century by Mary Ward to supply the means of a sound religious and secular education to young ladies. Henry James Coleridge describes her as "a bright, quiet, high-spirited girl, fond of fun, and with much depth of character." In these times students did not return home for Easter, Christmas or summer holidays but stayed at the school until they left, usually in their late teens.

In 1807, her eldest sister, Cecilia was professed at the Ursuline convent in Cork. Frances travelled from Dublin to Cork for the ceremony, where she met Mary Aikenhead. Cecilia Ball took the name of Sister Francis Regis and was within a few years made Superior of the convent in Cork. Upon the death of her father in 1808, Frances returned to Dublin. Frances was expected to make an admirable wife for the son and heir of some rich Catholic Dublin merchant family.

Dr. Daniel Murray, Archbishop of Dublin, was eager to establish Catholic education for girls in Ireland. In June 1814, under his direction, Frances returned to York and entered the novitiate of the Institute of the Blessed Virgin Mary. There she received her religious training, and made her profession in September 1816, taking, in religion, the name of "Teresa".

== Sisters of Loreto ==
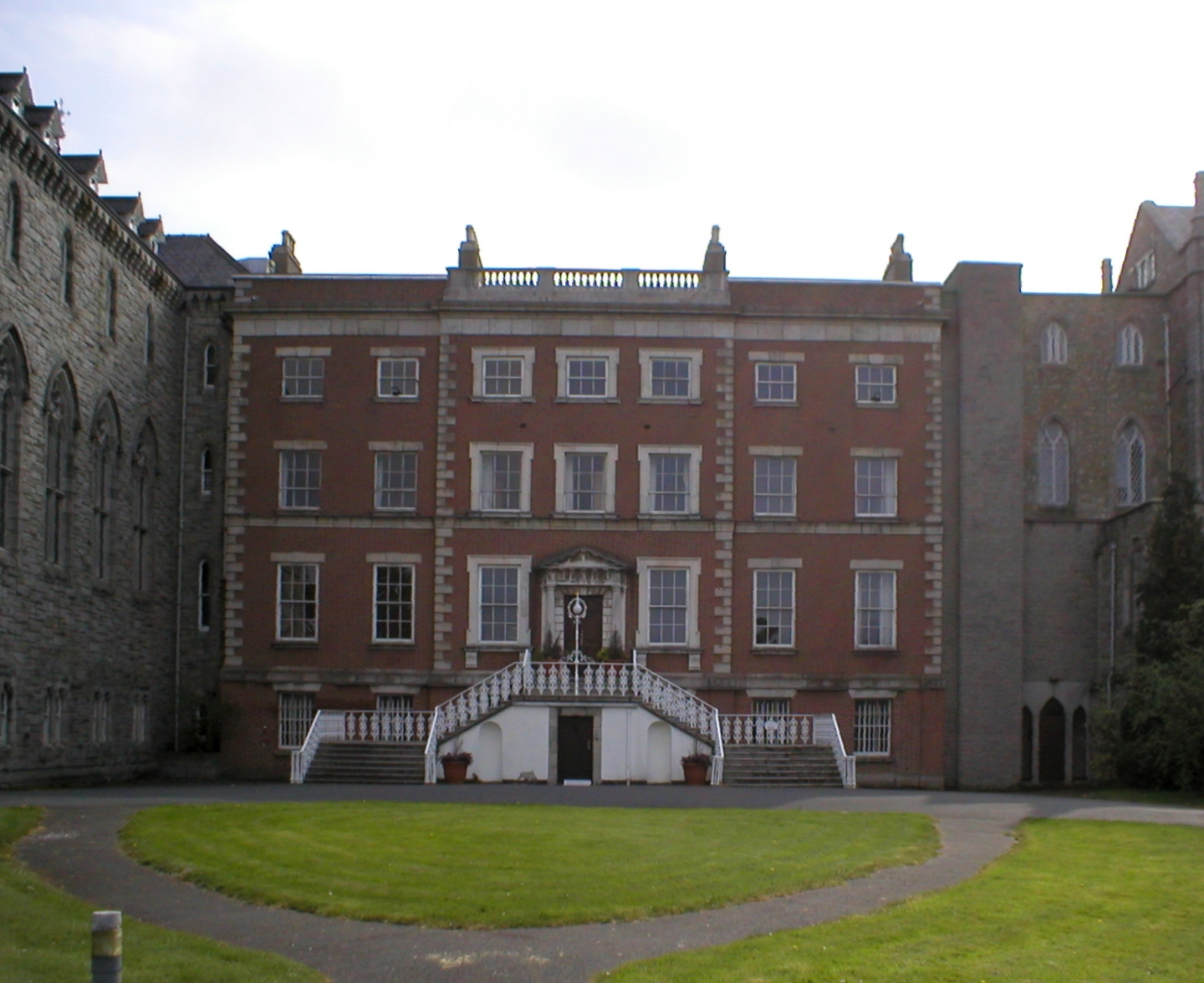
Rathfarnham House, Loretto Abbey

Recalled by Archbishop Murray, she returned to Dublin with two novices, in 1821, to establish the Irish Branch of the Institute of the Blessed Virgin Mary for the instruction of children. They stayed with the Mary Aikenhead and the Irish Sisters of Charity in Stanhope Street while Rathfarnam House was being renovated. In 1822 she opened the first institution of the order in Ireland, in Rathfarnam House, four miles from Dublin. Mother Teresa decided to call the house "Loreto" after the village in Italy to which the Nazareth house of the Holy Family was said to have been miraculously transported.

Mother Frances was a woman of great piety and administrative ability. Her energies were devoted to the establishment of schools and to the development of the sisterhood which now has members in many countries. The first offshoot was planted in Navan, County Meath, in the year 1833. The year 1840 was marked by the erection of the first church in Ireland dedicated to the Sacred Heart, in Loretto Abbey, Rathfarnham. In addition to the boarding and day schools, the sisters conduct orphanages. Her sister, Anna Maria helped her in the development of her schools, providing the funds for her to purchase the Loreto school on St Stephen's Green.

== Loreto schools ==
According to the local tradition, the house where the Holy Family lived in Nazareth was carried to Loreto, Italy, by angels in the year 1295 to protect it from destruction. The Holy House of Loreto became one of the great pilgrimage centres of mediaeval Italy. The devotion of Mary Ward to the shrine at Loreto is well documented.

For almost forty years after bringing the IBVM to Ireland, Teresa Ball established a network of convents and schools across Ireland, as well as in India, Mauritius and Canada. The nuns are usually called Loreto Sisters after the shrine at Loreto, Marche in Italy where Mary Ward used to pray.

Mother Mary Teresa Ball died at Rathfarnham Abbey in May 1861.
