= John O'Connell (MP) =

Irish politician

John O'Connell JP DL (24 December 1810 – 24 June 1858) was one of seven children (the third of four sons) of the Irish Nationalist leader Daniel O'Connell and his wife Mary. He followed his father as a Member of Parliament and leader of the Repeal Association.

== Life ==
Educated at Clongowes Wood College, Trinity College Dublin, and the King's Inns, O'Connell was then called to the bar, but did not practice.

He served in the United Kingdom Parliament as Member of Parliament for Youghal from 1832 to 1837, for Athlone from 1837 to 1841, for Kilkenny from 1841 to 1847, for Limerick from 1847 to 1851 and for Clonmel from 1853 to 1857.

O'Connell was tried with his father in the 1843 State Trials, and was imprisoned in Richmond prison before being released the next year by an order of the House of Lords. During his father's declining years, he was the dominant force in the Repeal Association and denounced Young Ireland as irreligious and lawless. In 1847, he closed down Conciliation Hall, and in 1848 reacted to the Rising by establishing closer links with the government. Of Daniel's four sons, he was considered to be the only one who inherited something of his father's political skill: he was nicknamed "The Young Liberator", although critics claimed he did little to justify the title.

In 1851, he took part in the downfall of Lord John Russell and the Whigs from government. After being censured by his constituency, he resigned his seat by taking the Chiltern Hundreds. He opposed the Tenant Right League and was subsequently elected as member for Clonmel in 1853, after which he accepted a sinecure position as Clerk of the Crown and Hanaper at Dublin Castle.

O'Connell was not an impressive public speaker, but wrote political works for the Repeal Association.

His brothers Maurice, Morgan and Daniel were also members of parliament.

== Publications ==
- Argument for Ireland (1844)
- Repeal Dictionary (1845)
- The Life and Speeches of Daniel O'Connell (1846, ed.)
- Recollections (1846)

== See also ==
- O'Connell of Derrynane

Parliament of the United Kingdom
Preceded by Hon. George Ponsonby	Member of Parliament for Youghal; 1832–1837	Succeeded by Frederick John Howard
Preceded by George Mathew	Member of Parliament for Athlone; 1837–1841	Succeeded by George de la Poer Beresford
Preceded by Joseph Hume	Member of Parliament for Kilkenny; 1841–1847	Succeeded by Michael Sullivan
Preceded by James Kelly	Member of Parliament for Limerick; 1847–1851	Succeeded by Earl of Arundel
Preceded by Cecil John Lawless	Member of Parliament for Clonmel; 1853–1857	Succeeded by John Bagwell
