= Henry Edward Doyle =

Irish painter, draughtsman and gallery director

- Born: 1827; Dublin, Ireland
- Died: 17 February 1893 (aged 65–66); London, England
- Parent(s): John Doyle; Marianna Conan

Henry Edward Doyle CB (1827 – 17 February 1893) was an Irish painter and draughtsman. For 23 years the director of the National Gallery of Ireland, the longest serving director.

== Life ==
Portrait of a Gentleman with a Handlebar Moustache by Doyle

Doyle was the third child of seven of John Doyle (author of the "H. B." political sketches) and Marianne, daughter of Mr. James Conan, of Dublin. He was born in 1827, the only one of his siblings to be born in Dublin. Doyle returned to Dublin to be educated as an artist before returning to London to establish himself as a practising artist. He worked briefly for Punch magazine in 1844, where his brother Richard also worked. He then drew cartoons for Fun magazine between 1867 and 1869. Doyle's other brothers, James William Edmund, was a draughtsman, and Charles Altamont was a watercolour artist.

Doyle was a devout Catholic, and his work often depicts religious themes. On the recommendation of Cardinal Wiseman, he was appointed Commissioner for Rome at the 1862 International Exhibition in London, and for his services in that capacity was nominated a Knight of the Order of Pius IX. Politically, Doyle was a Unionist, going on to be appointed Justice of the Peace for County Wicklow in 1884. Out of all of his siblings, Doyle remained more closely tied to Ireland. He painted frescos in the chapel of the Dominican convent at Cabra in 1864.

He was Art Superintendent of the International Exhibition of 1865, in Dublin, where he exhibited a watercolour portrait of Cardinal Wiseman. This portrait along with other works by him are now held in the National Gallery of Ireland. Doyle was elected associate member of the Royal Hibernian Academy in 1872, and a full member in 1874.

He was elected Director of the National Gallery of Ireland (NGI) by the Board of Governors in 1869 following the death of George Francis Mulvany, the first holder of that office. During his directorship, the gallery purchased a number of important paintings including works by Rembrandt, Fra Angelico, and Nicholas Poussin. He developed the collections of Irish art, and in 1884 established the national portrait collection having organised an exhibition of Irish portraiture in 1872 in Dublin. He was also a member of the Committee of Advice for the three special exhibitions of national portraits from 1866 to 1868. In 1880 he was nominated a Companion of the Order of the Bath.

During his twenty-three years' incumbency of the directorship of the NGI, he raised that collection from insignificance to a more than respectable place among the minor galleries of Europe, and that in spite of extreme parsimony on the part of the treasury. He submitted plans drawn up by Sir Thomas Newenham Deane for an extension to the gallery in 1891, though he did not live to see this.

Doyle died suddenly on 17 February 1892 while visiting London from heart disease. He was succeeded as director of the NGI by Walter Armstrong.

== Family ==
On 6 February 1866 he married Jane Isabella Ball, daughter of the Right Hon. Nicholas Ball, one of the judges of the Court of Common Pleas and Jane Sherlock, and the sister of John Ball at St. James' Church, Spanish-place, London. The ceremony was performed by Jane's brother, the Rev. Anthony Ball.

His nephew was the author Sir Arthur Conan Doyle, through his brother Charles.
