= Cecil Lawless =

Irish politician (1821–1853)

Cecil John Lawless (1821 – 5 November 1853), was an Irish politician.

== Early life ==
Born 1821, Lawless was a younger son of Valentine Lawless, 2nd Baron Cloncurry, and Emily, daughter of Archibald Douglas.

== Political career ==
Lawless sat as Member of Parliament for Clonmel between 1846 and 1853. He was initially elected as a Repeal Association candidate, but was re-elected as a Whig in 1852. However, later the same year he again changed allegiance, this time to the Independent Irish Party.

== Personal life ==
Lawless married Frances Georgina, daughter of Jonas Morris Townsend and widow of John Digby, in 1848. He died in November 1853. His wife later remarried and died in 1890, and he died on 5 November 1853, aged 31 or 32.

Parliament of the United Kingdom
Preceded by David Richard Pigot	Member of Parliament for Clonmel; 1846–1853	Succeeded by John O'Connell
