= Arthur John Moore =

Count Arthur John Moore KHS (15 September 1849 – 5 January 1904) was a wealthy Roman Catholic Irish nationalist politician.

== Background and education ==
Born in Liverpool, Moore was the son of Charles Moore who had served as Member of Parliament (MP) for County Tipperary from 1865 to 1869. He was educated at Ushaw College, Durham. He married Mary Lucy Clifford of Hatherton Hall, Stafford, daughter of Sir Charles Clifford, on 7 February 1877. They resided at Mooresfort, Lattin, County Tipperary, Ireland.

== Political career ==
Moore was elected at the 1874 general election as a Home Rule League MP for Clonmel, holding the seat in the Parliament of the United Kingdom until the constituency's abolition for the 1885 general election. In Parliament he strongly advocated land reform, better treatment of children in workhouses, university education for Irish Catholics, and Home Rule.

He returned to the House of Commons briefly as an Irish Parliamentary Party MP, after winning a by-election on 16 February 1899 for the Londonderry City, but held the seat only until the general election the following year. He also held the offices of Deputy Lieutenant, Justice of the Peace and was High Sheriff in 1877. He was affiliated with the section of the Irish Party led by Tim Healy and his defeat as MP for Londonderry city in 1900 was partly due to the hostility of the dominant faction led by John Dillon.

== Papal honours ==
Moore was made a Knight Commander of the Order of St. Gregory the Great and Chamberlain of Honour to the Pope and was created a Papal Count by Pope Leo XIII in 1879.

Arthur John Moore was a Knight of the Equestrian Order of the Holy Sepulchre.

== Philanthropy ==
Moore financed the building of Ferryhouse Industrial School for Catholic boys near Clonmel. In 1884 he handed it over to the charge of the Rosminian Order to be run by them. He financed the foundation, donating the land and buildings for Mount St Joseph Abbey at Roscrea, where he is buried.

Parliament of the United Kingdom
| Preceded by John Bagwell | Member of Parliament for Clonmel; 1874 – 1885 | Constituency abolished |
| Preceded by Edmund Vesey Knox | Member of Parliament for Londonderry City; 1899 – 1900 | Succeeded by Marquess of Hamilton |
