= James William Edmund Doyle =

Antiquary and illustrator

- Born: 22 October 1822; London, England
- Died: 3 December 1892 (aged 70)
- Spouse: Jane Henrietta Hawkins
- Parent(s): John Doyle; Marianna Conan Doyle

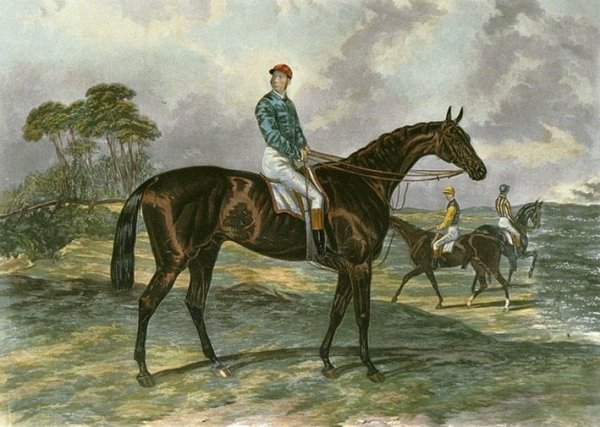
Engraving of 1879 Epsom Derby winner, Sir Bevys by D George Thompson after a work by James E Doyle

James William Edmund Doyle (22 October 1822 – 3 December 1892) was a historian, antiquarian, and illustrator

== Life ==
Doyle was born in London on 22 October 1822, was the eldest son of John Doyle. Richard, Henry Edward and Charles Altamont were younger brothers. He was the uncle of Arthur Conan Doyle.

He was educated at home and raised as a Roman Catholic. Due to his early interest in studying history, his family nicknamed him Priest. He inherited a portion of his father's artistic ability, and in early life studied drawing and painting. Among other works he executed a painting of Dr. Johnson reading the manuscript of the 'Vicar of Wakefield,' which was engraved and attained considerable popularity.

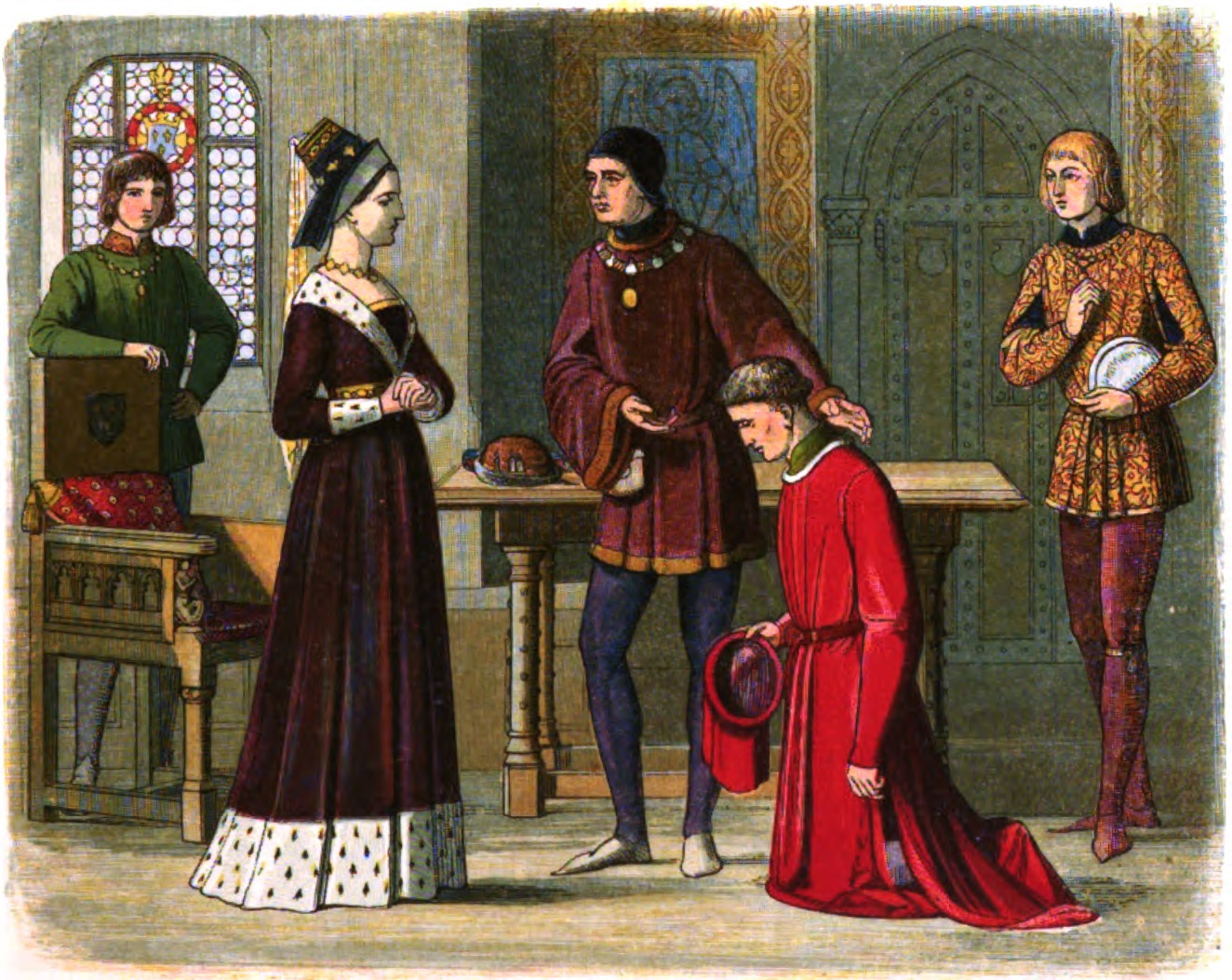
Feeling that Edward IV no longer values him, Richard Neville, 16th Earl of Warwick, betrays the Yorkists by turning to the Lancastrian queen, Margaret of Anjou

While comparatively young, however, Doyle abandoned the profession of an artist and devoted himself to historical studies. For his own edification he compiled a Chronicle of England from B.C. 55 to A.D. 1485, which he adorned with numerous illustrations in colours. It received considerable praise from various persons to whom it was afterwards submitted, among others from the prince consort, and was well received by the public when published in 1864. Doyle's illustrations were engraved and printed in colours by Edmund Evans.

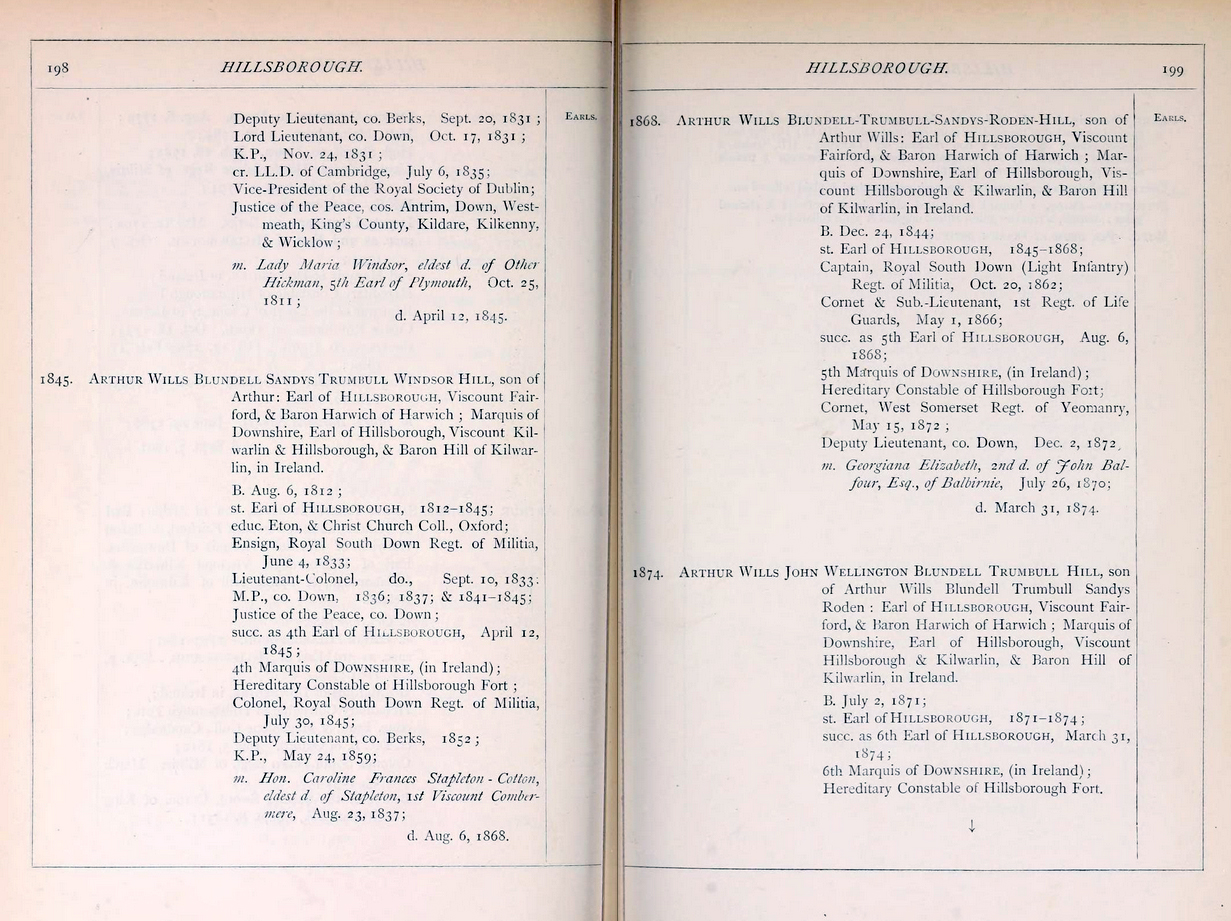
Page from The Official Baronage of England Volume 2

The great undertaking of Doyle's life, however, was his Official Baronage of England, which included every rank of nobility except barons. The epithet 'official' in the title means not that Doyle's 'Baronage' was published 'by authority,' but that it gave an exhaustive list of the offices held by the peers of whom it treated. The compilation was at first designed especially to cover the period between the Norman Conquest and the Revolution of 1688, but it was afterwards brought down to 1885. It provided particulars in as complete a manner as possible, of the succession, titles, offices, heraldic bearings, and personal appearance of each peer. The work was published in three quarto volumes in 1886, a large-paper edition, limited to two hundred copies, appearing somewhat earlier in 1885.

It was a painstaking but unequal work. For the earlier portion, especially the Norman and Angevin period, Doyle relied too much on secondary authorities, and was not sufficiently critical. Greatly to his disappointment, the book was not a financial success, and inflicted a heavy loss on the publishers. The book is, however, a standard text for the College of Arms, and was a shared interest with his sister-in-law, Mary Doyle.

In 1886, he wrote the explanatory text for Richard Doyle's coloured cartoons, entitled Scenes from English History.

He died in London on 3 December 1892 at his residence, 38 Dorset Square, and was buried in Kensal Green cemetery on 9 December.

== Family ==
On 12 February 1874, he married Jane Henrietta Hawkins at Our Lady of the Rosary Church, Marylebone Road, London.

== Major work ==
DOYLE, James E. (James William Edmund), 1822–1893: A CHRONICLE OF ENGLAND : B.C. 55 – A.D. 1485, published by Longman.
