= Charles Altamont Doyle =

English painter (1832–1893)

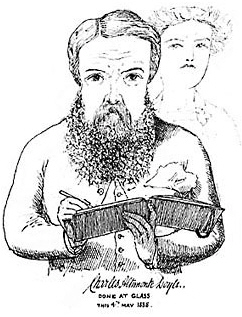
- Self-portrait, 1888 (Note: In the original, he has written "That's his guardian angel over the left, utterly disgusted".)
- Born: 25 March 1832; London, England
- Died: 10 October 1893 (aged 61); Dumfries, Scotland
- Known for: Watercolours; illustrations
- Spouse: Mary Foley (m. 1855)
- Children: 9 or 10, including Arthur Conan Doyle
- Parent: John Doyle (father)

Charles Altamont Doyle (25 March 1832 – 10 October 1893) was a British illustrator, watercolourist and civil servant. A member of an artistic family, he is remembered today primarily for being the father of author Sir Arthur Conan Doyle, creator of fictional character Sherlock Holmes.

== Early life ==
Born in London, Doyle was the son of artist John Doyle, a political cartoonist known as H.B., and Marianna (Conan) Doyle. The family had seven children, and three of his older brothers were artists: James William Edmund Doyle, Richard "Dickie" Doyle, and Henry Edward Doyle.

The family was of Irish background but Doyle was born and raised in England. Similarly to his elder brother Richard, he had no formal training, apart from lessons in his father's studio.

== Career ==
In 1849 Doyle moved to Edinburgh, to take up a post at the Scottish Office of Works, where he was employed as an assistant surveyor.

On 31 July 1855, he married Mary Foley (1837–1920), his landlady's daughter. Together they became parents to several children (sources debate whether it was nine or ten), seven of whom survived childhood, including Arthur Conan Doyle, John Francis Innes Hay (known as Innes or Duff), and Jane Adelaide Rose (known as Ida).

To support his growing family, in addition to full-time employment Doyle continued to produce illustrations for at least 23 books, as well as several designs for journals. These included editions of The Pilgrim's Progress (1860) and Robinson Crusoe (1861), Beauty and the Beast (late 1860s), The Queens of Society (1872), and Our Trip to Blunderland (1877) a parody of Lewis Carroll.

Although he exhibited at the Royal Scottish Academy, Doyle was not as successful an artist as he wanted, and suffered depression and alcoholism. His paintings, which were generally of fairies, such as In the shade or A Dance Around The Moon, or similar fantasy scenes, reflected his mood, becoming more macabre over time.

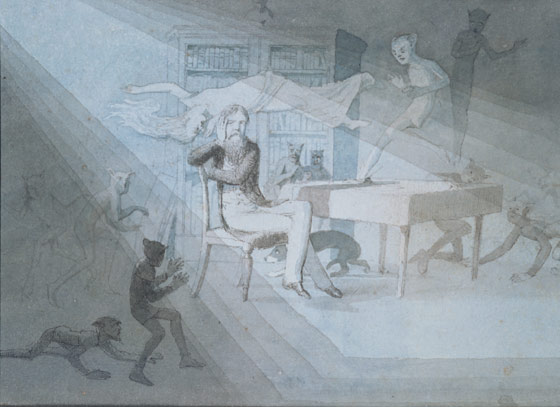
Meditation, Self Portrait 1885–1893, by Charles Altamont Doyle

In 1876 he was dismissed from his job and given a pension; in 1881 Doyle's family sent him to Blairerno House, a "home for Intemperate Gentlemen". After several escapades, in 1885 he was sectioned after managing to "procure drink", and becoming aggressively excited, remaining confused and incoherent for several days afterwards.

He was admitted to Sunnyside, Montrose Royal Lunatic Asylum. While there, his depression grew worse, and he began experiencing epileptic seizures and problems with short-term memory loss due to the effects of long-term drinking. Nonetheless, he continued to paint. He completed illustrations for the July 1888 edition of his son's first Sherlock Holmes novel A Study in Scarlet. During his period at the asylum he continued to work, producing volumes of drawings and watercolours in sketchbooks with fantasy themes such as elves, faerie folk, and scenes of death and heavenly redemption. His accompanying notes featured wordplay and visual puns, described as a "sort of bucolic phantasmagoria: mammoth lilypads and leafy branches, giant birds and mammals, sinister blossoms sheltering demons and damsels alike". Doyle created these illustrations to both protest his confinement and provide evidence of his sanity. He sent the drawings to his family as proof that he had been wrongfully committed, writing "Keep steadily in view that this Book is ascribed wholly to the produce of a MADMAN. Whereabouts would you say was the deficiency of intellect? Or depraved taste?" At other times he was more contented, contributing drawings and articles to the asylum's newsletter and sketching the staff. On 23 January 1892 he was admitted as a patient to the Royal Edinburgh Hospital, and was treated there until 26 May 1892.

In May 1892 he was moved to the Crichton Royal Institution, Dumfries. He died from "a fit during the night" on 10 October 1893. He was buried in the High Cemetery in Dumfries.

== Re-evaluation ==
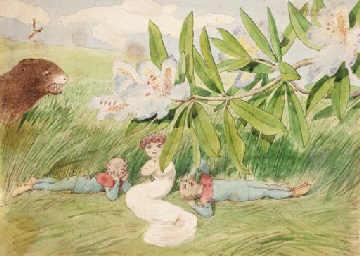
In the shade, by Charles Altamont Doyle

His son, Arthur Conan Doyle, remembered his father with affection, describing him in his autobiography as "...full of the tragedy of unfulfilled powers and of underdeveloped gifts. He had his weaknesses, as all of us have ours, but he had also some very remarkable and outstanding virtues". In the Sherlock Holmes story "His Last Bow" (1917), Holmes uses the name Altamont as an alias. In 1924 he mounted an exhibition of his father's works at the Brook Galleries in London, where they were praised by George Bernard Shaw.

The Doyle Diary, containing a facsimile of works from a sketchbook he created from March to July 1889 while at Montrose, was published in 1978. This brought Doyle's work to wider attention and appreciation.

== General reference ==
- Baker, Michael (1978). The Doyle Diary: The Last Great Conan Doyle Mystery. With a Holmesian Investigation into the Strange and Curious Case of Charles Altamont Doyle. New York: Paddington Press. ISBN 0448220687.
