= Clonmel (UK Parliament constituency) =

UK parliamentary constituency in Ireland, 1801–1885

- Former borough constituency for the House of Commons
- County: County Tipperary
- Borough: Clonmel

1801–1885
- Seats: 1
- Created from: Clonmel
- Replaced by: East Tipperary

Clonmel was a United Kingdom Parliament constituency in Ireland, returning one MP from 1801 to 1885. It was represented in Parliament when the Union of Great Britain and Ireland took effect on 1 January 1801.

== History ==
The corporation of Clonmel, which was the local government of its area, was reformed by the Municipal Corporations (Ireland) Act 1840. The parliamentary borough was not affected by this change in administrative arrangements.

Samuel Lewis, writing in 1837, described the oligarchic constitution of the unreformed borough.

"The corporation is of great antiquity, and probably exists by prescription. Numerous charters have at various times been granted since the reign of Edw. I.; that under which the borough is now governed was granted in the 6th of Jas. I. (1608), and, under the title of "The Mayor, Bailiffs, Free Burgesses, and Commonalty of the Town or Borough of Clonmel," ordains that the corporation shall consist of a mayor, two bailiffs, twenty free burgesses (including the mayor and bailiffs), and a commonalty, with a recorder, chamberlain, town-clerk, and other officers. The freedom was formerly obtained by nomination of a burgess to the common council, a majority of whom decided on the admission; but at present the rights of birth, extending only to the eldest son, apprenticeship to a freeman within the borough, and marriage with a freeman's daughter, are recognised as titles to it. The borough returned two members to the Irish Parliament till the Union, since which time it has sent one to the Imperial Parliament. The elective franchise was vested in the freemen at large, amounting, in the year 1832, to 94 in number; but by the act of the 2nd of Wm. IV., cap. 88, it has extended to the £10 householders: the number of voters registered at the close of 1835 was 805; the mayor is the returning officer. The electoral boundary, under the act of the 2nd and 3rd of Wm. IV., cap. 89, is confined to the town, including Long Island on the south and a space on the north side of the river for buildings contemplated in that quarter, and comprises an area of 361 statute acres, the limits of which are minutely described in the Appendix. The jurisdiction of the corporation extends over a large rural district comprising about 4800 statute acres, of which 3800 are in the county of Waterford, and 1000 in Tipperary: the mayor and recorder are justices of the peace."

The constituency was disenfranchised under the Redistribution of Seats Act 1885, which took effect at the 1885 general election.

== Boundaries ==
This constituency was the parliamentary borough of Clonmel in County Tipperary. In December 1831, boundary commissioners proposed boundaries for the borough. The boundary of the borough was defined in the Parliamentary Boundaries (Ireland) Act 1832 as:

"From the Point at which the Western Enclosure Wall of the House of Industry meets the River Suir, along the said Western Wall to the Point at which the same meets Marl Street; thence along Saint Stephen's Lane to the Point at which the same meets the old Cahir Road; thence, Eastward, along the old Cahir Road to the Point at which the same is met by a Lane running Northward; thence, Northward, along the said Lane to the Point at which the same is met by the first Bank on the Right; thence, Eastward, along the said Bank to the Point at which the same is met by a Lane coming from the North and turning to the East; thence, Eastward, along the last-mentioned Lane to the Point at which the same meets Heywood Street; thence along a Bank which runs Eastward from a House a little to the South of the Point last described to the Point at which the said Bank meets a small Bye Lane leading into the Cashel Road; thence along the said Bye Lane to the Cashel Road; thence, Southward, along the said Cashel Road to the Point at which the same is met by the Southern Boundary Wall of the Park or Pleasure Grounds of Mr. David Malcolmson; thence along the said Boundary Wall to the Point where the said Wall meets Upper Johnson Street; thence, Eastward, along Backbone Lane to the Extremity thereof; thence to a Point in the new Road to Fethard, which Point is Sixty-four Yards to the North of the Spot at which the said Road is crossed by Bonlie Lane; thence, Southward, for Sixty-four Yards, to the said Spot where the Fethard Road is crossed by Bonlie Lane; thence, Eastward, along Bonlie Lane for about Six hundred and forty-four Yards, to a Point at which the same is met by a Bank on the Right opposite a small House; thence, Southward, along the said Bank for the Distance of about Two hundred and nine Yards to the Point where it is met by another Bank running Eastward; thence, Eastward, along the last-mentioned Bank for about Fifty Yards to a Point where the same makes an Angle in turning to the South; thence, Southward, for about Fifty Yards along a Bank which leads to a Bye Road to Powers Town until the said Bank reaches the said Bye Road; thence, Eastward, along the said Bye Road for the Distance of about Two hundred and seventeen Yards to the Spot where it is met by the first Bank on the Right; thence in a straight Line to the most Northern Point of a Bank on the Southern Side of the Dublin Road, which Point is distant about Four hundred and sixty-four Yards from a Stone in Barrack Street which marks the South-eastern Corner of the Ordnance Land; thence along the last-mentioned Bank to the Point at which the same meets the River Suir; thence along the southernmost Channel of the River Suir as far as Moore's Island; thence along the Channel of the same to the North of Moore's Island to the Point first described."

Under the Representation of the People (Ireland) Act 1868, any part of a municipal borough not contained within the boundaries of parliamentary boroughs was brought within the parliamentary borough. In the case of Clonmel, the municipal borough was defined in terms of the parliamentary borough, so it was not affected by this legislation.

== Members of Parliament ==
Election	Member	Party	Note
1801, 1 January	seat vacant	...	Both members in the Irish Parliament had resigned
1801, 13 February	William Bagwell	Tory	Resigned to contest County Tipperary
1819, 6 March	John Kiely	Tory	Stooks Smith gives this members first name as James
1820, 18 March	James Hewitt Massy Dawson	Tory	Resigned to contest County Limerick
1830, 22 February	Eyre Coote	Tory	
1832, 15 December	Dominick Ronayne	Repeal Association	Re-elected as a candidate of a Whig/Repealer pact
1835, 16 January	Dominick Ronayne	Whig	Died
1836, 20 February	Nicholas Ball	Whig	Appointed a Judge of the Irish Court of Common Pleas
1839, 18 February	Rt Hon. David Richard Pigot	Whig	Appointed Lord Chief Baron of the Exchequer in Ireland
1846, 12 September	Hon. Cecil Lawless	Repeal Association	Re-elected as a Liberal candidate
1852, 17 July	Hon. Cecil Lawless	Independent Irish	Died
1853, 21 December	John O'Connell	Radical	Appointed Clerk of the Crown in Ireland
1857, 17 February	John Bagwell	Whig	
1859, 2 May	John Bagwell	Liberal	
1874, 6 February	Count Arthur John Moore	Home Rule League	
1885	Constituency abolished		

== Elections ==
=== Elections in the 1830s ===
General Election 1830: Clonmel
Party	Candidate	Votes	%
Tory	Eyre Coote (MP)	Unopposed	
Registered electors		c. 105	
Tory hold			

General Election 1831: Clonmel
Party	Candidate	Votes	%
Tory	Eyre Coote (MP)	Unopposed	
Tory hold			

General Election 1832: Clonmel
Party	Candidate	Votes	%
Repeal	Dominick Ronayne	262	55.3
Tory	John Bagwell	212	44.7
Majority		50	10.6
Turnout		474	91.0
Registered electors		521	
Repeal gain from Tory			

General Election 1835: Clonmel
Party	Candidate	Votes	%	±%
Repeal (Whig)	Dominick Ronayne	262	51.0	−4.3
Conservative	John Bagwell	252	49.0	+4.3
Majority		10	2.0	−8.6
Turnout		514	70.8	−20.2
Registered electors		726		
Repeal hold		Swing	−4.3	

Ronayne's death caused a by-election.

By-election, 20 February 1836: Clonmel
Party	Candidate	Votes	%	±%
Whig	Nicholas Ball	Unopposed		
Registered electors		749		
Whig gain from Repeal				

General Election 1837: Clonmel
Party	Candidate	Votes	%	±%
Whig	Nicholas Ball	284	66.8	+15.8
Conservative	Richard Hely-Hutchinson	141	33.2	−15.8
Majority		143	33.6	+31.6
Turnout		425	53.5	−17.3
Registered electors		795		
Whig gain from Repeal		Swing	+15.8	

Ball was appointed as Attorney General for Ireland, requiring a by-election.

By-election, 16 July 1838: Clonmel
Party	Candidate	Votes	%
Whig	Nicholas Ball	Unopposed	
Whig hold			

Ball was appointed a judge of the Court of Common Pleas in Ireland, causing a by-election.

By-election, 18 February 1839: Clonmel
Party	Candidate	Votes	%
Whig	David Richard Pigot	Unopposed	
Whig hold			

=== Elections in the 1840s ===
Pigot was appointed Attorney General for Ireland, requiring a by-election.

By-election, 21 August 1840: Clonmel
Party	Candidate	Votes	%	±%
Whig	David Richard Pigot	Unopposed		
Whig hold				

General Election 1841: Clonmel
Party	Candidate	Votes	%	±%
Whig	David Richard Pigot	Unopposed		
Registered electors		687		
Whig hold				

Pigot resigned after being appointed Chief Baron of the Irish Exchequer, causing a by-election.

By-election, 12 September 1846: Clonmel
Party	Candidate	Votes	%	±%
Repeal	Cecil Lawless	Unopposed		
Repeal gain from Whig				

General election 1847: Clonmel
Party	Candidate	Votes	%	±%
Repeal	Cecil Lawless	142	100.0	N/A
Whig	James Henry Monahan	0	0.0	N/A
Majority		142	100.0	N/A
Turnout		142	26.3	N/A
Registered electors		540		
Repeal gain from Whig		Swing	N/A	

=== Elections in the 1850s ===
General election 1852: Clonmel
Party	Candidate	Votes	%	±%
Independent Irish	Cecil Lawless	182	68.4	−31.6
Conservative	Thomas Henry Barton	84	31.6	New
Majority		98	36.8	−63.2
Turnout		266	70.2	+43.9
Registered electors		379		
Independent Irish gain from Repeal		Swing		

Lawless' death caused a by-election.

By-election, 21 December 1853: Clonmel
Party	Candidate	Votes	%	±%
Radical	John O'Connell	Unopposed		
Radical gain from Independent Irish				

O'Connell resigned after being appointed Clerk of the Crown and Hanaper at Dublin Castle, causing a by-election.

By-election, 17 February 1857: Clonmel
Party	Candidate	Votes	%	±%
Whig	John Bagwell	184	69.4	N/A
Conservative	Edward Bagwell Purefoy	51	19.2	−12.4
Independent	Patrick Joseph Murray	30	11.3	New
Majority		133	50.2	N/A
Turnout		265	83.3	+13.1
Registered electors		318		
Whig gain from Radical		Swing		

General election 1857: Clonmel
Party	Candidate	Votes	%	±%
Whig	John Bagwell	Unopposed		
Registered electors		318		
Whig gain from Independent Irish				

General election 1859: Clonmel
Party	Candidate	Votes	%	±%
Liberal	John Bagwell	Unopposed		
Registered electors		353		
Liberal hold				

Bagwell was appointed a Lord Commissioner of the Treasury, requiring a by-election.

By-election, 1 July 1859: Clonmel
Party	Candidate	Votes	%	±%
Liberal	John Bagwell	Unopposed		
Registered electors		353		
Liberal hold				

=== Elections in the 1860s ===
General election 1865: Clonmel
Party	Candidate	Votes	%	±%
Liberal	John Bagwell	Unopposed		
Registered electors		350		
Liberal hold				

General election 1868: Clonmel
Party	Candidate	Votes	%	±%
Liberal	John Bagwell	Unopposed		
Registered electors		436		
Liberal hold				

=== Elections in the 1870s ===
General election 1874: Clonmel
Party	Candidate	Votes	%	±%
Home Rule	Arthur John Moore	220	59.6	New
Liberal	John Bagwell	149	40.4	N/A
Majority		71	19.2	N/A
Turnout		369	83.3	N/A
Registered electors		443		
Home Rule gain from Liberal		Swing	N/A	

=== Elections in the 1880s ===
General election 1880: Clonmel
Party	Candidate	Votes	%	±%
Home Rule	Arthur John Moore	244	73.3	+13.7
Conservative	Stephen Moore	89	26.7	New
Majority		155	46.6	+27.4
Turnout		333	77.4	−5.9
Registered electors		430		
Home Rule hold		Swing		
