= Richard Doyle (illustrator) =

English illustrator

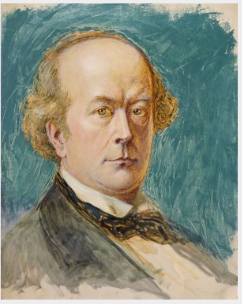
- Born: 18 September 1824; London, England
- Died: 10 December 1883 (aged 59); London, England
- Known for: Children's literature
- Parent(s): John Doyle; Marianna Conan

Richard Doyle (18 September 1824 – 10 December 1883) was a British illustrator of the Victorian era. His work frequently appeared, amongst other places, in Punch magazine; he drew the cover of the first issue, and designed the magazine's masthead, a design that was used for over a century.

== Biography ==
Born at 17 Cambridge Terrace, London, one of seven children of Irish cartoonist John Doyle (known as 'H.B'), a noted political caricaturist, Doyle had three brothers, James, Charles and Henry Edward Doyle, who were also artists. The young Doyle had no formal art training other than his father's studio, but from an early age displayed a gifted ability to depict scenes of the fantastic and grotesque. Throughout his life he was fascinated by fairy tales. He produced his first complete illustrated book, Home for the Holidays, when he was twelve; it was published posthumously in 1887.

He joined the staff of Punch in 1843 aged 19, remaining there for seven years.

He was the uncle of Sir Arthur Conan Doyle, author of the Sherlock Holmes stories.

== Career ==
Doyle's first published illustrations appeared in The Eglinton Tournament (1840), a humour book set in the Middle Ages, which met with commercial success.

Doyle collaborated with John Leech, W. C. Stanfield and other artists to co-illustrate three Charles Dickens Christmas books, The Chimes (1844), The Cricket on the Hearth (1845) and The Battle of Life (1846).

In 1846 Doyle's illustrations for The Fairy Ring (a new translation of Grimm's tales), first made his name as a fairytale illustrator. Following this in 1849 he produced Fairy Tales from All Nations (compiled by 'Anthony R. Montalba', which proved a tremendous success. Doyle was able to fully explore his love of fairy mythology with his many illustrations and borders filled with elves, pixies and other mythical creatures.

Following this success Doyle illustrated a string of fantasy titles: The Enchanted Doll by Mark Lemon (1849), The Story of Jack and the Giants (1850), and John Ruskin's The King of the Golden River (1850), which went through three editions in its first year of publication.

Edward Ellice was a serial host for notable visitors to Scotland. In 1859 Doyle was invited and Katherine Ellice, an amateur artist, served as host when he visited. Katherine was given an illustrated diary of a journey to the islands of Rona and Skye and this is extant.

He also wrote for Punch a series of articles entitled Manners and Customes of ye Englyshe. A devout Roman Catholic, he resigned his position on the staff of Punch in 1850 in response to its hostility to what was termed "papal aggression", and spent the remainder of his career in preparing drawings for book illustration and to painting in watercolour. Doyle published works of his own, which helped establish his reputation with a large readership: Manners and Customs of Ye Englishe (1849) and Bird's Eye View of Society (1864).

His chief series of illustrations were those for The Newcomes, The King of the Golden River, and The Foreign Tour of Brown, Jones and Robinson. In 1844, Doyle designed the cover of Punch's sixth issue. It became the basis of the magazine's masthead until 1954, and was based on Titian's "Bacchus and Ariadne".

His masterpiece is indubitably In Fairyland, a series of Pictures from the Elf World, with a poem by William Allingham, printed by Edmund Evans and published by Longman in time for Christmas 1869 (dated 1870). In the 16 colour plates and 36 line illustrations plus title page, Doyle was given a completely free hand. The folio was richly bound in green cloth, and has been described as one of the finest examples of Victorian book production (Richard Dalby, The Golden Age of Children's Book Illustration, 1991 p. 12). The illustrations were used in the publication of another book as well, The Princess Nobody by Andrew Lang (1884).

Doyle was generally regarded as being brilliant but unreliable. For example, he was consistently late with his illustrations for The Newcomes, only meeting his commitments when Thackeray threatened to give the work to another artist. Doyle's excuses were often ridiculous, and the Dalziel brothers reported that on one occasion he failed to meet a deadline because he had 'not got any pencils'. Such amateurism hampered Doyle's success. Several books he had been commissioned to illustrate did not appear because he lacked the application needed to finish them, and completed work was often uneven in quality and 'deplorably pedestrian'.

Doyle signed many of his drawings with the depiction of a small bird standing on the initials 'RD', a reference to his nickname "Dickie" (as in "dickie bird").

== Gallery ==
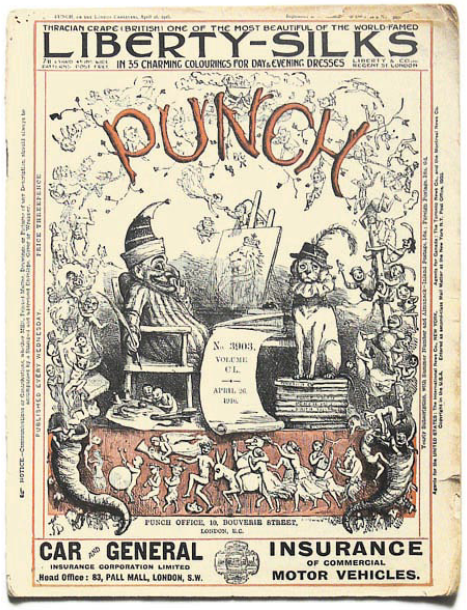
Doyle's design for the cover of Punch showing his monogram of a "dickie bird" perched on the initials 'RD' (lower left)

Doyle's monogram of a "dickie bird" perched on the initials 'RD'

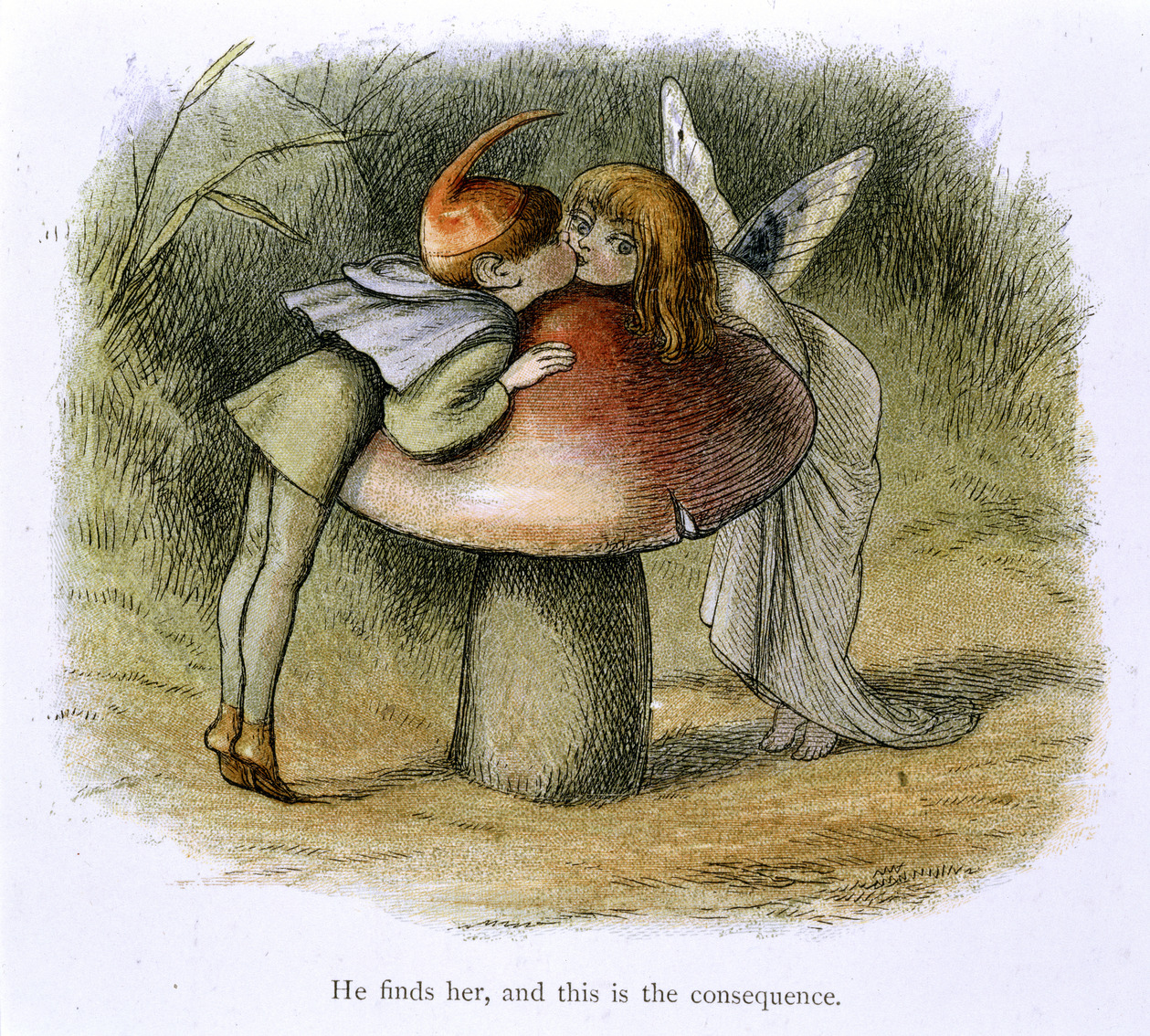
An elf and a fairy kissing, from In Fairy Land (1870)

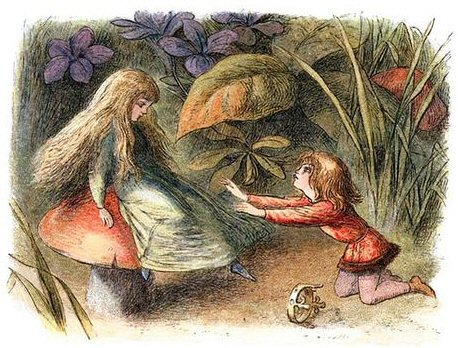
The prince thanking the Water Fairy, image from Princess Nobody (1884), illustrated by Doyle, engraved and coloured by Edmund Evans

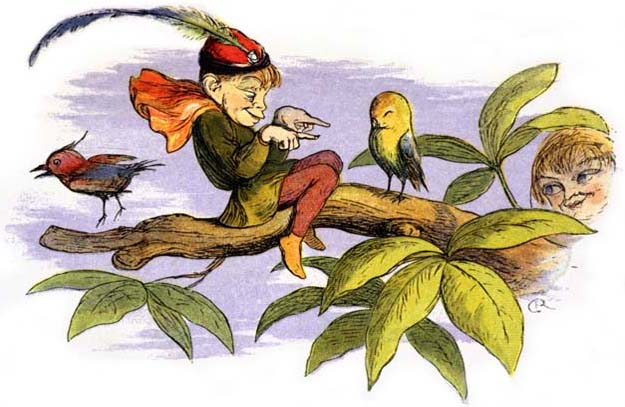
Poor little birdie teased, illustrated by Doyle, engraved and coloured by Edmund Evans

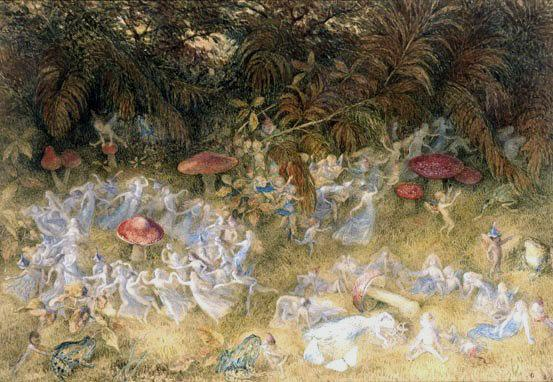
Fairy Rings and Toadstools (1875)

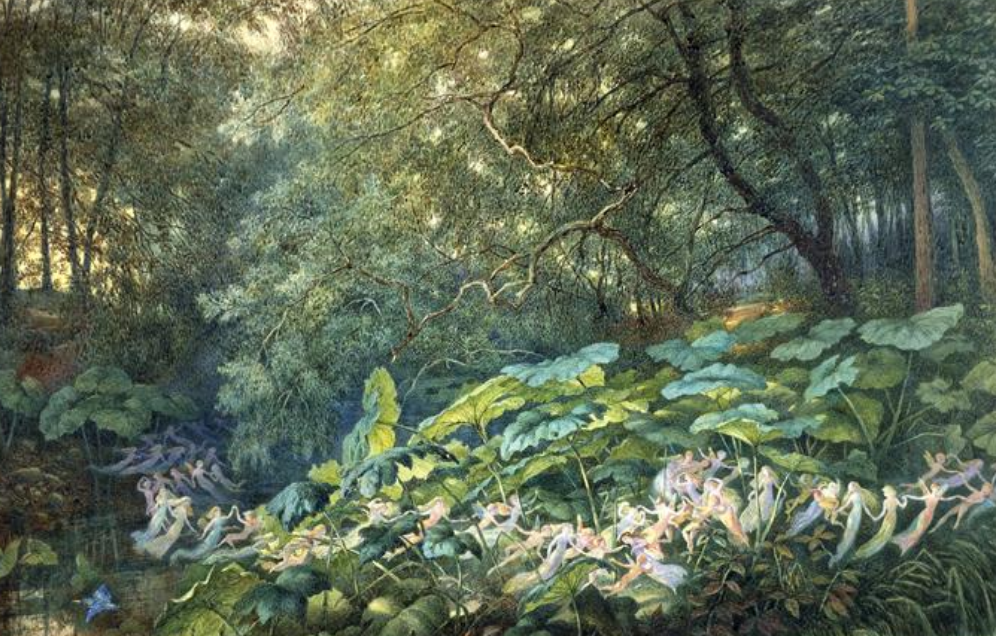
Under the Dock Leaves: An Autumnal Evening Dream (1878)

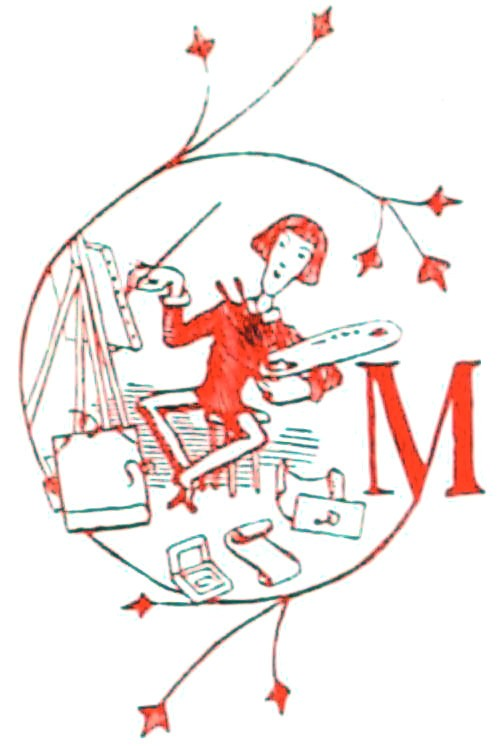
"Manners and Cvstoms" from the illustrated work Manners and customs of ye Englyshe

Page from An old fairy tale : the sleeping beauty (1868) featuring illustration by Richard Doyle, as engraved by the Dalziel Brothers.
