= John Bagwell (Liberal politician) =

Irish politician (1811–1883)

John Bagwell DL, JP (3 April 1811 – 2 March 1883) was an Irish Liberal politician.

Bagwell was the son of Reverend Richard Bagwell and Margaret Croker. He was High Sheriff of Tipperary in 1834, a deputy lieutenant for County Tipperary and a justice of the peace. He sat as member of parliament for Clonmel between 1857 and 1874 and served under Lord Palmerston as a Lord of the Treasury from 1859 to 1862.

Bagwell resided at the family estate at Marlfield, Clonmel. He married Eliza Prittie on 21 June 1838 and they had six children Elizabeth, Margaret, Emily, Fanny, Richard and William.

Parliament of the United Kingdom
Preceded by John O'Connell	Member of Parliament for Clonmel; 1857–1874	Succeeded by Count Arthur John Moore
