= David Pigot (cricketer, born 1900) =

Irish cricketer

Personal information
- Full name: David Richard Pigot
- Born: 14 January 1900; Dublin, Leinster, Ireland
- Died: 10 August 1965 (aged 65); Sandymount, Leinster, Ireland
- Batting: Right-handed
- Bowling: Right-arm fast-medium
- Relatives: David Pigot, Jr. (son); James Pigot (brother)

Domestic team information
- Years: Team
- 1922–1939: Ireland
- 1922–1926: Dublin University

Career statistics
| Competition | First-class |
|---|---|
| Matches | 11 |
| Runs scored | 338 |
| Batting average | 15.36 |
| 100s/50s | –/1 |
| Top score | 51 |
| Balls bowled | 42 |
| Wickets | 0 |
| Bowling average | – |
| 5 wickets in innings | – |
| 10 wickets in match | – |
| Best bowling | – |
| Catches/stumpings | 4/– |
- Source: Cricinfo, 28 October 2018

David Richard Pigot (14 January 1900 – 10 August 1965) was an Irish first-class cricketer.

Pigot was born at Dublin to Alice Maud Knox, and her husband, John Henry Pigot, who would serve as president of the Irish Cricket Union from 1925–1928. He was educated at Mount St Benedict's College in Gorey, County Wexford, before attending St Stephen's Green School in Dublin. From there, he went up to Trinity College, Dublin in 1917, where he was a member of Dublin University Cricket Club.

It was for Dublin University that he made his debut in first-class cricket for, against Essex at Brentwood as part of the clubs 1922 tour of England. Following this match, Pigot travelled up to Glasgow, where he made his debut for Ireland against Scotland. He played in the Ireland v Scotland first-class fixture of 1923, before a gap of three years before his next appearance in first-class cricket, which came for Dublin University against Northamptonshire at College Park. His next first-class appearance for Ireland didn't come until 1931, with Pigot playing intermittently for Ireland in the 1930s. His final first-class match came in the Ireland v Scotland fixture of 1939 at Dublin. Playing a total of eleven first-class matches, he scored 338 runs at an average of 15.36, with a high score of 51. This score, which was his only first-class half century, came against Scotland in 1922. He continued to play club cricket until 1945 for Phoenix, alongside his work as a solicitor.

He had married Meta Violet Blood-Smyth in January 1928, with the couple having three sons, one of whom, David Jr., also played first-class cricket. Outside of cricket, Pigot's other interests included rugby union, where he played for Lansdowne Football Club. He was also a bridge player, which he represented Ireland in for twenty years, as well as being the Irish delegate to the European Bridge League. Pigot died at Sandymount in August 1965 and was buried at Glasnevin Cemetery. Other notable family members include his brother, James Pigot, who played first-class cricket. His great grandfather was the judge David Richard Pigot.
