= Anna Maria Ball =

- Born: 1785; 5 Werburgh Street, Dublin
- Died: 28 March 1871 (aged 85–86); Mountjoy Square, Dublin

Anna Maria Ball became Anna Maria O'Brien (1785 - 28 March 1871) was an Irish philanthropist.

== Life ==
Anna Maria Ball was born in 1785 at 5 Werburgh Street, Dublin. She was the second daughter of John Ball, a silk merchant, and his second wife Mabel Clare (née Bennett). Her full brother was Nicholas Ball, one of the first Roman Catholics to be appointed a High Court judge, and her sisters included Mother Frances Mary Teresa Ball of the Sisters of Loreto. Ball was educated at St Mary's convent, Micklegate Bar, Yorkshire from July 1800 until 1803. Upon her return to Dublin, she began her philanthropic work. In November 1805, she married a wealthy Dublin merchant, John O'Brien, bringing a dowry of £5000.

Ball became friends with Mary Aikenhead in 1807 when she attended the profession of her older sister Cecilia into the Ursulines in Cork. Aikenhead regularly visited Ball and her husband at their home on Mountjoy Square, and they would visit the Dublin poor together. She was also a close friend of the future archbishop of Dublin, Daniel Murray, a relationship she used to help Aikenhead in her foundation of the Religious Sisters of Charity. In 1809, she was involved in the establishment of the House of Refuge in Ashe Street, Dublin, and oversaw its move to Stanhope Street in 1814 to be taken over by the new order of the Sisters of Charity. She was a generous patron of the Sisters of Charity, aiding in the fund-raising for St. Vincent's Hospital, with her chaperoning three sisters to Paris to study nursing in 1833. Alongside the sisters, Ball made visits to female prisoners in Kilmainham Gaol and to Jervis Street Hospital. She was appointed the manager of the sisters' school on King's Inns Street, a position she filled until old age prevented her from visiting. Ball also supported the Sisters of Loreto in Ireland which was founded by her youngest sister, Frances Mary Teresa Ball. She provided the funds for the sisters to buy their house on St Stephen's Green.

Ball had no children of her own, but she raised the three orphaned children of her elder half-brother, John Ball after his death in 1812. She died on 28 March 1871 at her home in Mountjoy Square, after suffering from senility for two years previously. A portrait of Ball by Nicholas Joseph Crowley from 1845 is held by the Sisters of Charity.
