= Michael O'Brien (Irish sportsman) =

Irish sportsman

Michael O'Brien was an Irish sportsman who played in the League of Ireland during the 1920s and also played Gaelic football and cricket. He was known by the nickname Ginger.

O'Brien had a short spell at centre forward for Bohemians, making his debut for the club on 26 December 1925 against Shamrock Rovers at Dalymount Park. Bohs won 2–0, a result which denied Rovers the league title. He also represented Shelbourne amongst others.

He played Gaelic football for the O'Tooles club and played at right-half-forward for the Dublin county team.
