= Nicholas Ball (lawyer) =

Irish barrister, judge and politician

Nicholas Ball PC (Ire), QC (1791 – 19 January 1865) was an Irish barrister, judge and Liberal politician.

He was the second son of John Ball, a silk mercer of Dublin, where he lived for many years at No 75, St Stephen's Green. He was the only son of his father's second marriage to Mabel Clare Bennett of Eyrecourt, County Galway. He had one half-brother John and four sisters, including the leading philanthropist Anna Maria Ball, Mother Frances Mary Teresa Ball, founder of the Irish House of the Sisters of Loreto, and Isabella Ball, mother of the prominent barrister and politician David Sherlock. As a young man he travelled widely in Europe and spent two years in Rome, where he was said to have met members of the Curia to discuss Catholic Emancipation. Ball was called to the bar in 1814 and became a King's Counsel in 1830.

Six years later, he was nominated as Third Serjeant-at-law (Ireland) and was admitted additionally a bencher of King's Inns. In the same year he also entered the British House of Commons for Clonmel. He disliked public speaking and made few contributions to House of Commons debates: one historian remarks that he was noted for delighting in a good dinner and for silence in debate. A moderate reformer in politics, he had naturally supported Catholic Emancipation (he had been accused, rather improbably, of negotiating on the subject with the Vatican while still in his early twenties), but he firmly opposed repeal of the Act of Union 1800. Ball served as Attorney-General for Ireland during Lord Melbourne's second government from 11 July 1838 to 23 February 1839, having been sworn of the Privy Council of Ireland on taking office. When he subsequently was appointed a judge of the Court of Common Pleas (Ireland), he was only the second Roman Catholic since the reign of King James II of England to have held this post.

On 30 October 1817, he married Jane Sherlock, daughter of Thomas Sherlock and his wife Jane Mansfield, of Butlerstown, County Waterford, and had several children. Their daughter, Jane Isabella, married Henry Edward Doyle, director of the National Gallery of Ireland, and uncle of the celebrated author Arthur Conan Doyle. Ball's son, John, was a Liberal politician and a noted naturalist. Another son, Anthony, was a Catholic priest.

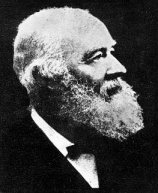
John Ball, son of Nicholas and Jane

Parliament of the United Kingdom
Preceded by Dominick Ronayne	Member of Parliament for Clonmel; 1836–1839	Succeeded by David Richard Pigot
Legal offices
Preceded by Stephen Woulfe	Attorney-General for Ireland; 1838–1839	Succeeded by Maziere Brady
