= David Richard Pigot =

Irish judge

David Richard Pigot, PC, KC (c. 1796 – 22 December 1873) was one of the leading Irish judges of his time. His children included John Edward Pigot, a noted music collector and one of the founders of the National Gallery of Ireland. His grandchildren included the Australian astronomer and Jesuit Edward Pigot.

== Life ==
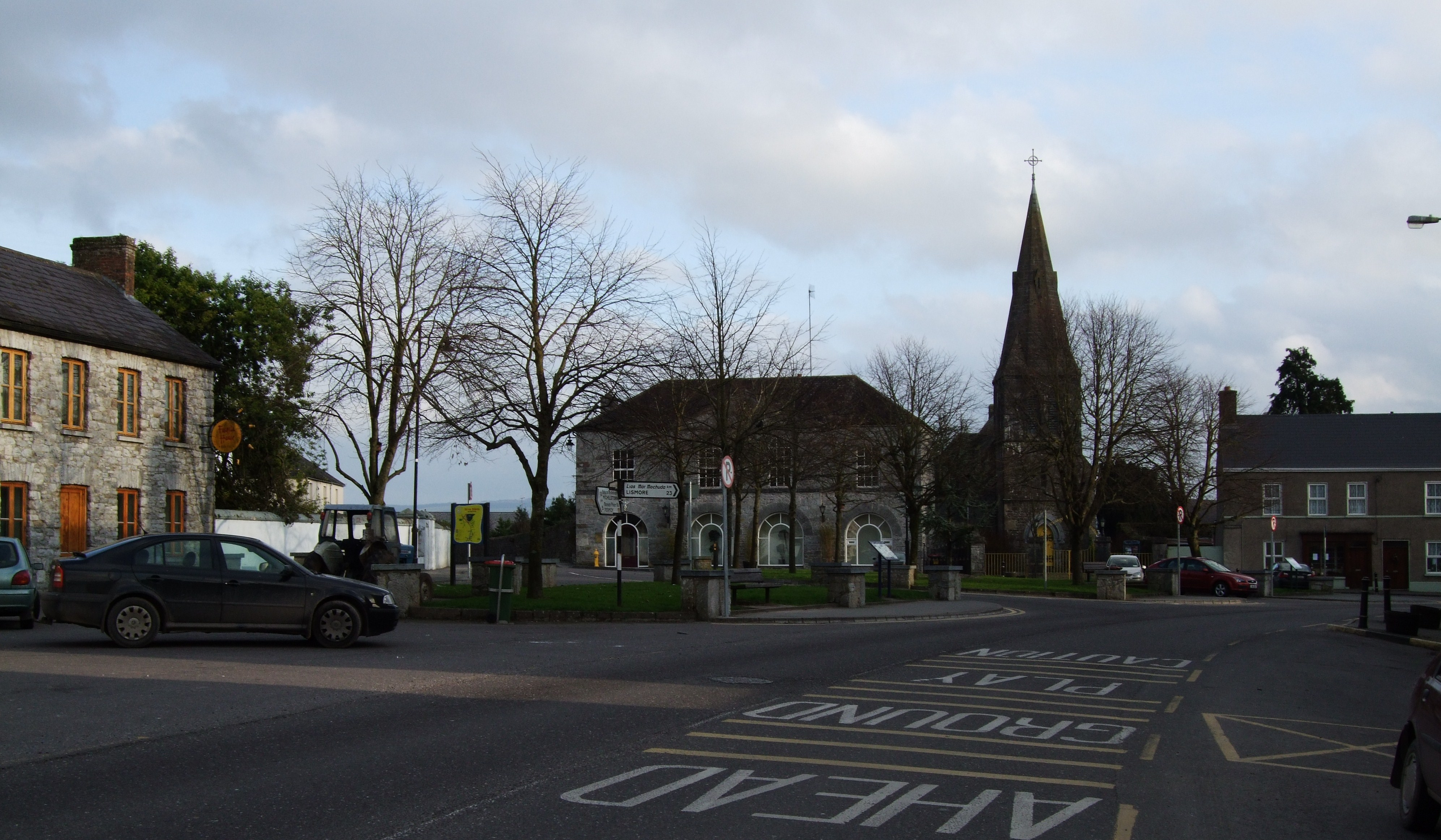
Kilworth, County Cork, Pigot's birthplace

Pigot was born at Park House, in Kilworth, County Cork, the only son of John Pigot, a doctor of Physic of high reputation, and his wife Margaret Nagle. He went to school in Fermoy and graduated from Trinity College Dublin. Originally he intended to follow his father's profession, and studied medicine in Edinburgh. He then decided on a career in the law, was called to the Bar in 1826 and became King's Counsel in 1835. He represented Daniel O'Connell in the unsuccessful effort to prosecute him in 1831, and in later life, he was one of the few judges of whom O'Connell spoke highly. He was appointed Solicitor-General for Ireland in 1839 and elected to parliament as member for Clonmel in the same year. He was Attorney-General for Ireland from 1840 to 1841. He was a visitor of Maynooth College. In 1846 he was appointed Chief Baron of the Irish Exchequer and held that office until his death. In January 1848, Pigot sat as Lord Chief Baron, alongside Lord Chief Justice Francis Blackburne, on the Special Commission for County Clare held at Ennis to try cases arising from agrarian disturbance. He was also briefly considered for the office of Lord Chancellor of Ireland in 1868.

He lived at No. 80 Merrion Square, which was then one of the most fashionable streets in Dublin, where several of his judicial colleagues also had their residences. Unlike many of his colleagues, he does not seem to have had a "place in the country".

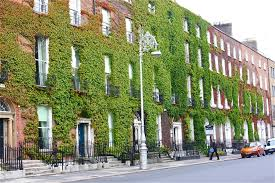
Merrion Square- Pigot lived at No. 80

Both Ball in The Judges in Ireland 1221-1921 and Delaney in his biography of Pigot's successor Christopher Palles praise Pigot highly as a judge of great intelligence, high principles and integrity. Both agree that he had one serious fault - his habit of inquiring into the most minute details of litigation, which tended to greatly prolong the length of hearings. Ball states however that the Irish Bar regarded this with indulgence as a very minor fault in a judge for whom they felt the greatest respect. Delaney, writing in 1960, noted that a Pigot judgement was still a strong authority for counsel to have on their side.

In his later years, questions were raised in the press about his ability to perform his duties, but these criticisms were solely on account of his physical health, rather than any lack of legal skill: in 1855 the Law Times named him as one of five senior judges alleged to be too old or ill to perform effectively, and noted that he had recently spent six months in Spain for his health. Presumably his health recovered, as he was able to continue with his judicial duties for another eighteen years, and died in office on 22 December 1873. He was buried, alongside his wife Catherine and his parents in Killgullane Churchyard, near Kilworth, where his grave can still be seen.

== Family ==
Pigot married Catherine Page, daughter of Walter Page (or Paye) of Araglin Mills, a neighbour of the Pigots in Kilworth, in 1821. They had five sons, John Edward, David, Walter, JonasQuain and Thomas, and two daughters, Marie and Catherine. His wife died in 1869.

Of his sons, probably the most distinguished was John Edward (1822-1871), the eldest, who was a close friend of the poet and Young Irelander Thomas Davis. He was called to the Bar, and practised for some years in India, but is better remembered today as a noted collector of Irish music, and for playing a leading role in founding the National Gallery of Ireland, of which he was one of the original Governors. David junior was a master in the Court of Exchequer: he married Christina Murray, daughter of Sir James Murray, the eminent doctor and chemist and his first wife Mary Sharrock, and was the father of the noted Australian Jesuit and astronomer Edward Pigot (1858-1929). Thomas (1837-1910), the youngest son, was a highly regarded engineer; Jonas Quain (1834-1913) the fourth son, was a barrister who became a judge in Calcutta. Pigot's daughter Marie married the leading physician Robert Dyer Lyons in 1856. Many of the Chief Baron's descendants were eminent lawyers.

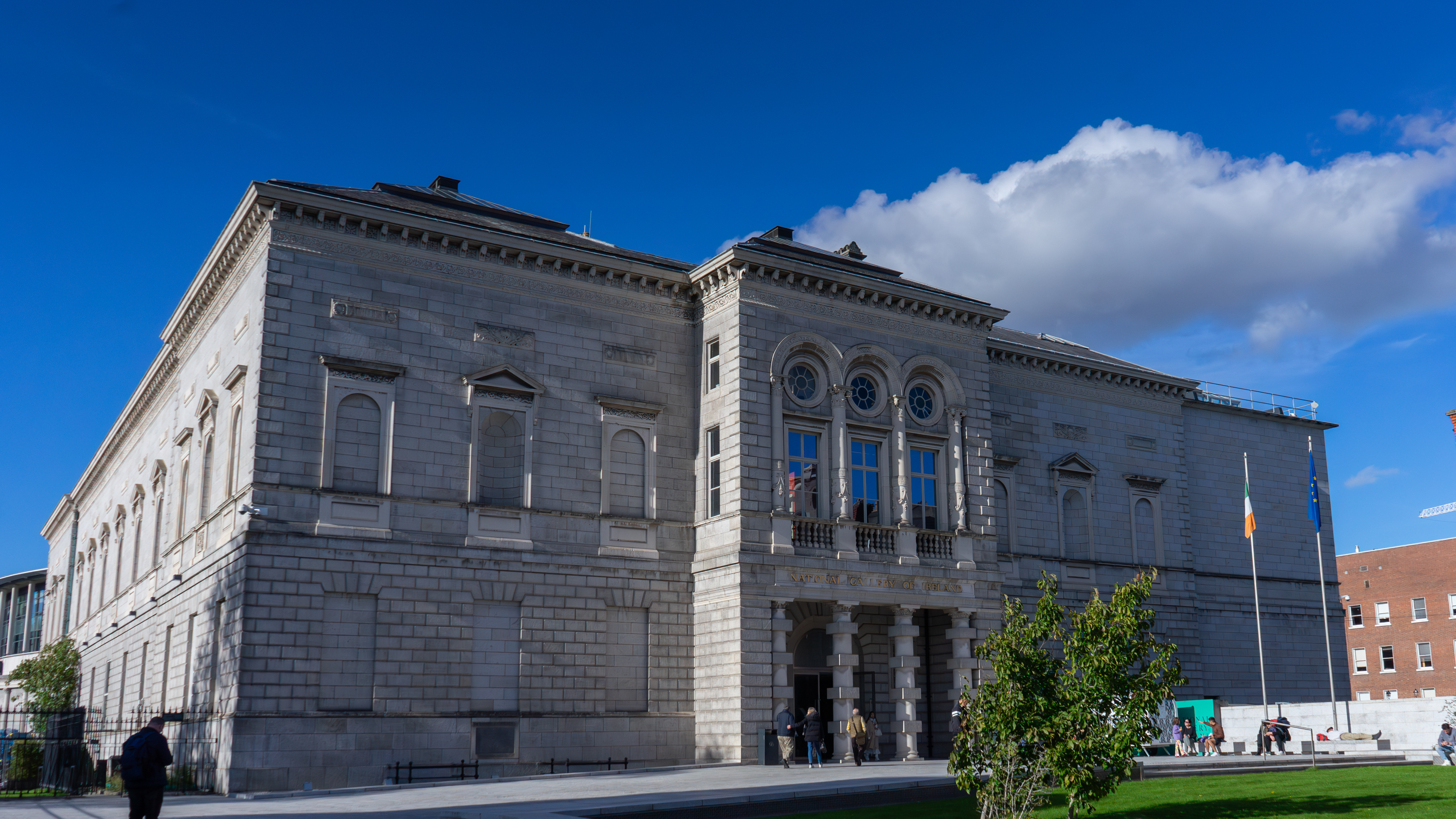
National Gallery of Ireland, which Pigot's son John did much to create.

In private life, the judge, like his son John, was a highly knowledgeable musician. He also shared John's enthusiasm for the National Gallery project, and many of the earliest discussions of the project took place in his house in Merrion Square. He was a member of the Royal Irish Academy.

Parliament of the United Kingdom
Preceded by Nicholas Ball	Member of Parliament for Clonmel; 1839–1846	Succeeded by Hon. Cecil Lawless
Legal offices
Preceded by Maziere Brady	Solicitor-General for Ireland; 1839–1840	Succeeded by Richard Moore
Preceded by Maziere Brady	Attorney-General for Ireland; 1840–1841	Succeeded by Francis Blackburne
Preceded by Maziere Brady	Chief Baron of the Irish Exchequer; 1846–1873	Succeeded by Christopher Palles
