= Stopford =

Stopford is a surname, and may refer to:

== People ==
- Albert Stopford (1860–1939), British antiques and art dealer
- Alice Stopford Green (1847–1929), Irish historian and nationalist
- Charles Stopford (born 1962), American fraudster
- Edward Stopford (disambiguation), multiple people
- Frederick Stopford (1854–1929), British army officer
- Henry Stopford (1797–1881), Irish Anglican cleric
- James Stopford (disambiguation), multiple people
- John Stopford (disambiguation), multiple people
- Joseph Stopford (1866–1951), British archer
- Joshua Stopford (1636–1675), Church of England clergyman and author
- Les Stopford (born 1942), English footballer
- Lionel Stopford (1860–1942), British Army officer
- Marjorie Stopford (1904–1996), English Girl Guide leader
- Martin Stopford (born 1947), British economist
- Mary Stopford (disambiguation), multiple people
- Montagu Stopford (1892–1971), British Army officer
- Montagu Stopford (Royal Navy officer) (1798–1864)
- Patrick Stopford, 9th Earl of Courtown (born 1954)
- Philip Stopford (born 1977), English organist and composer
- Richard Bruce Stopford (1774–1844), British Anglican priest
- Robert Stopford (disambiguation), multiple people
- Sammy Stopford (born 1956), British ballroom dancer and teacher
- Thomas Stopford (died 1805), Irish Anglican bishop
- William Stopford (1848–1928), American military officer and politician

== Given name ==
- Stopford Brooke (disambiguation), multiple people

== Other uses ==
- Bishop Stopford School
- Bishop Stopford's School
- Stopford Building, second largest building at the University of Manchester
- Stopford Peak, peak on Hoseason Island, Palmer Archipelago, Antarctica
