= John Stopford =

John Stopford may refer to:

- John Stopford (rugby league) (1936–1998), English rugby league footballer
- John Stopford (priest), Anglican priest in Southern Rhodesia
- John Stopford, Baron Stopford of Fallowfield (1888–1961), British peer, physician and anatomist
- John M. Stopford (1939–2011), British organisational theorist

== See also ==
- Stopford (surname)
