= General Stopford =

General Stopford may refer to:

- Edward Stopford (British Army officer, born 1732) (1732–1796), British Army major-general
- Sir Edward Stopford (British Army officer, born 1766) (1766–1837), British Army lieutenant-general, nephew of the above
- Sir Frederick Stopford (1854–1929), British Army lieutenant-general, great-great-nephew of Edward Stopford (born 1732)
- Sir Montagu Stopford (1892–1971), British Army general, great-great-great-nephew of Edward Stopford (born 1732)

== See also ==
- Edward Stopford Claremont (1819–1890), British Army general, son of Sir Edward Stopford
