= James Stopford =

James Stopford may refer to:

- James Stopford, 1st Earl of Courtown (1700–1770), Irish politician
- James Stopford, 2nd Earl of Courtown (1731–1810), known as Viscount Stopford 1762–1770; Anglo-Irish peer and Tory politician
- James Stopford, 3rd Earl of Courtown (1765–1835), Anglo-Irish peer and Tory politician
- James Stopford, 4th Earl of Courtown (1794–1858)
- James Stopford, 9th Earl of Courtown (born 1954)
- James Stopford (bishop) (died 1759), Bishop of Cloyne
- James Stopford (Australian politician) (1878–1936), member of the Queensland Legislative Assembly

== See also ==
- Stopford (surname)
- Earl of Courtown
