= Countess of Courtown =

Countess of Courtown is the title given to the wife of the Earl of Courtown. Women who have held the title include:

- Mary Stopford, Countess of Courtown (died 1810)
- Mary Stopford, Countess of Courtown (died 1823)
