= John Becher =

John Becher may refer to:

- John Becher (priest, born 1861) (1861–1946), Anglican archdeacon in Ireland
- John Thomas Becher (1770–1848), English clergyman and social reformer
- John C. Becher (1915–1986), American stage and television actor
- John A. Becher (1833–1915), American businessman and politician
