= Johannes (Cistercian; Bishop of Leighlin) =

Irish bishop (died 1201)

Johannes (also known as John), O.Cist. was an Irish bishop in the late twelfth and early thirteenth centuries.

Formerly Abbot of Monasterevin, he was consecrated Bishop of Leighlin at Rome by Pope Innocent III on 18 September 1198; and died in 1201. His brother William was the first recorded Archdeacon of Leighlin, holding the office in 1200.
