= Mary Stopford, Countess of Courtown =

Mary Stopford, Countess of Courtown, may refer to:

- Mary Stopford, Countess of Courtown (died 1810)
- Mary Stopford, Countess of Courtown (died 1823)
