= Edward Stopford Claremont =

British soldier

General Edward Stopford Claremont CB
- Born: Edward Charles John Stopford; 23 January 1819; Paris, France
- Died: 16 July 1890 (aged 71)
- Occupations: Soldier, military attaché
- Spouse: Frances Charlotte Wetherall
- Parent(s): Sir Edward Stopford; Anaïs Aubert
- Relatives: James Stopford, 2nd Earl of Courtown (grandfather); James Stopford, 3rd Earl of Courtown (uncle)
- Awards: Légion d'Honneur

General Edward Charles John Stopford Claremont CB (born Stopford; 23 January 1819 – 16 July 1890) was a British soldier who was the United Kingdom's first military attaché, holding the post in Paris for 25 years.

== Early life ==
Stopford Claremont was born in Paris with the name Edward Charles John Stopford, the illegitimate son of Lt.-Gen. Hon. Sir Edward Stopford and Anaïs Pauline Nathalie Aubert, known as Mademoiselle Anaïs, an actress in the Comédie-Française.

His paternal grandparents were James Stopford, 2nd Earl of Courtown and Mary Powys. His uncle, James Stopford, 3rd Earl of Courtown, refused to allow him to use the sole name of Stopford because of his illegitimate status and so he was naturalised in Britain by private act of Parliament in 1836 with the name of Edward Stopford Claremont.

== Career ==
Claremont entered the British Army in 1838 as an Ensign in the Royal Regiment of Foot, and was promoted to Lieutenant in 1841 and Captain in the Royal Canadian Rifle Regiment in 1845. For "distinguished service" he was given brevet rank of Major in 1854. As "military commissioner" he was attached to the French army in 1855 during the Crimean War and was commended for his services by General Canrobert. Later that year he was given brevet Lieutenant-Colonel rank and awarded the CB. He was also with French forces during the Second Italian War of Independence in 1859 and the Franco-Prussian War in 1870–71.

The Emperor of the French said that Stopford Claremont was his favourite English officer and awarded him the Fourth Class of the Légion d'Honneur after the Crimean War, and later promoted him to the Third Class. The Ottoman Sultan gave him (along with many other British officers) the Order of the Medjidie, 4th class, in 1858, at which time he was described as "Military Attache to Her Majesty's Embassy at Paris". In 1862 the Queen gave him the further honour of Groom of the Privy Chamber. He was given the local rank of major-general in 1870, fully promoted the next year (backdated to 1868), and promoted again to Lieutenant-General in 1877.

Stopford Claremont retired in 1881 with the honorary rank of full General. He was honorary colonel of the Bedfordshire Regiment from 1883 until his death.

== Personal life ==
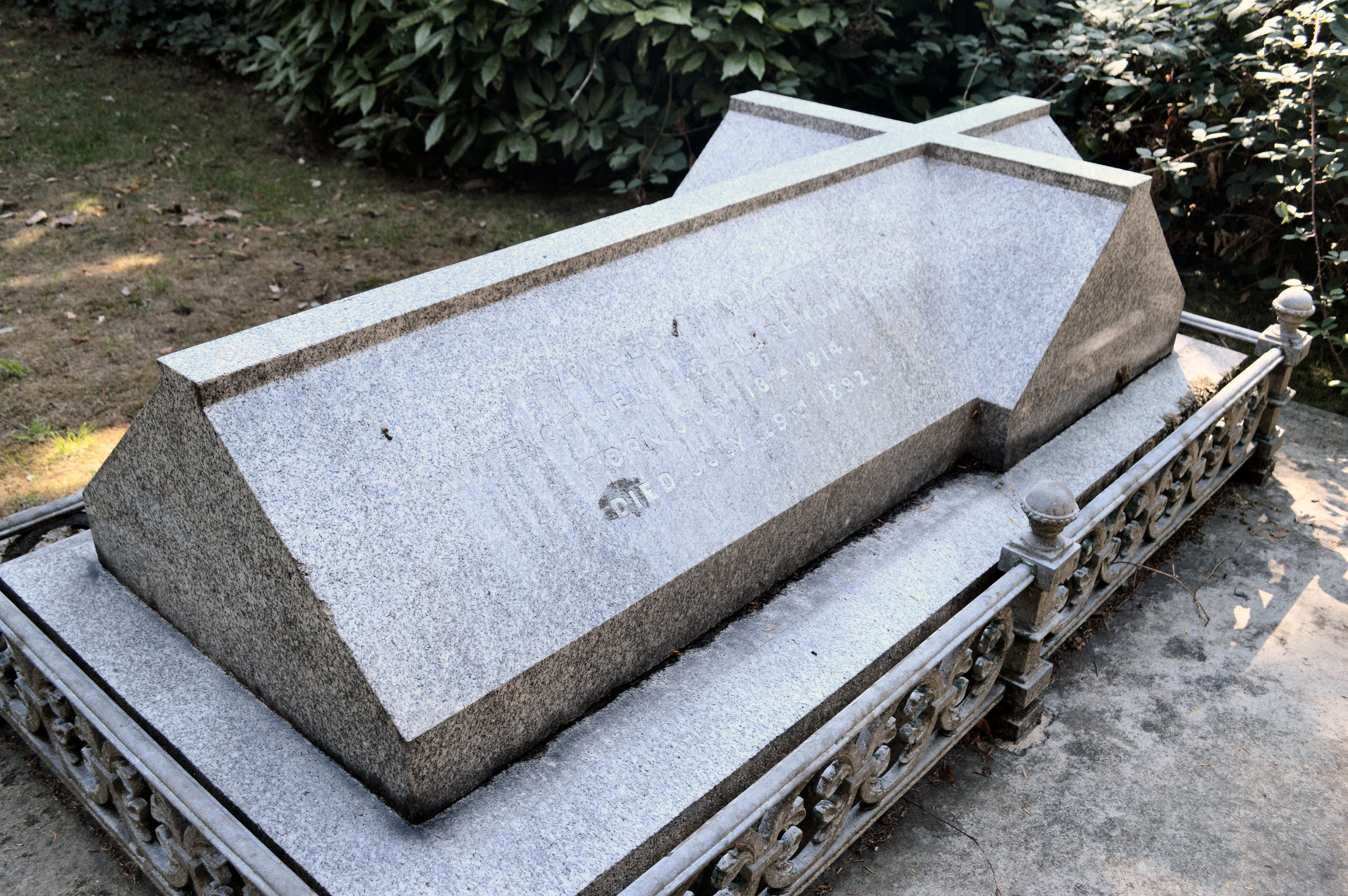
His tomb in Roehampton, where he is buried with his wife Frances

In 1843, Stopford Claremont was married to Frances Charlotte Wetherall, a daughter of Gen. Sir George Wetherall, in Doncaster. Together, they had six children, including:

- George William Frederick Stopford Claremont (1844–c. 1891), who married Marianne "Daisey" McNeil-Hamilton (née Ewing), widow of William Henry McNeil-Hamilton, in 1887.
- Emily Fanny Stopford Claremont (1846–c. 1896), who married Capt. Fletcher Castell Hungerford Littledale of Cookham End, Berkshire, son of Arthur Littledale, in 1878.
- Edward MacDougal (or McDougall) Stopford Claremont (1847–c. 1935), who married Flora Mary Darell, a sister of Sir Lionel Darell, 6th Baronet and Brig.-Gen. William Harry Verelst Darell, in 1872. After her death in 1907, he married Dorothy Griffiths, a daughter of Lt. Charles John Griffiths, in 1909.
- Henry Alexander Stopford Claremont (later Lyne-Stephens) (1848–1894) of Grove House, Roehampton who married Katherine Gregory Walker, a daughter of Edward Walker, of Henbury Manor, Wimborne, in 1882. After his death, his widow married Lt.-Col. Raoul Paston-Bedingfeld, a younger son of Sir Henry Paston-Bedingfeld, 6th Baronet.
- Annie Charlotte Stopford Claremont (1853–1913), who married Capt. Cecil Thorold, brother to Sir John Thorold, 12th Baronet, in 1875. After his death in 1895, she married Ralph Henry Seymour Hall in 1902. After his death, she married John Felix Riley in 1903.
- Olivia Gertrude Louisa Stopford Claremont (1857–1940), who married stockbroker John Algernon Bastard (grandson of John Bastard, MP).

Reportedly, he had a liaison at some point with the wealthy widow, Yolande Lyne-Stephens as his third son Henry changed his surname from Stopford Claremont to Lyne-Stephens.

Stopford Claremont died on 16 July 1890. He was a trustee of the Lyne-Stephens Mausoleum on the grounds of Yolande's home, Grove House, and requested in his will that he be buried outside of it. Frances Claremont died two years later and joined her husband inside the tomb outside the mausoleum.

=== Descendants ===
Through his son Henry, he was a grandfather of Sybil Lyne-Stephens, who married Sir Henry Paston-Bedingfeld, 8th Baronet (son of Sir Henry Paston-Bedingfeld, 7th Baronet and nephew of Lt.-Col. Raoul Paston-Bedingfeld), a Major in the Liverpool Regiment who served in the Boer War.
