= Charles Huson =

Irish Anglican priest

Charles Huson (1712–1777) was an Irish Anglican priest.

Huson was born in Dublin and educated at Trinity College there, He was Archdeacon of Leighlin from 1763 to 1769; and Archdeacon of Ferns from 1769 until his death.

He is buried in the grounds of St Iberius, Wexford.
