= Parcel (consignment) =

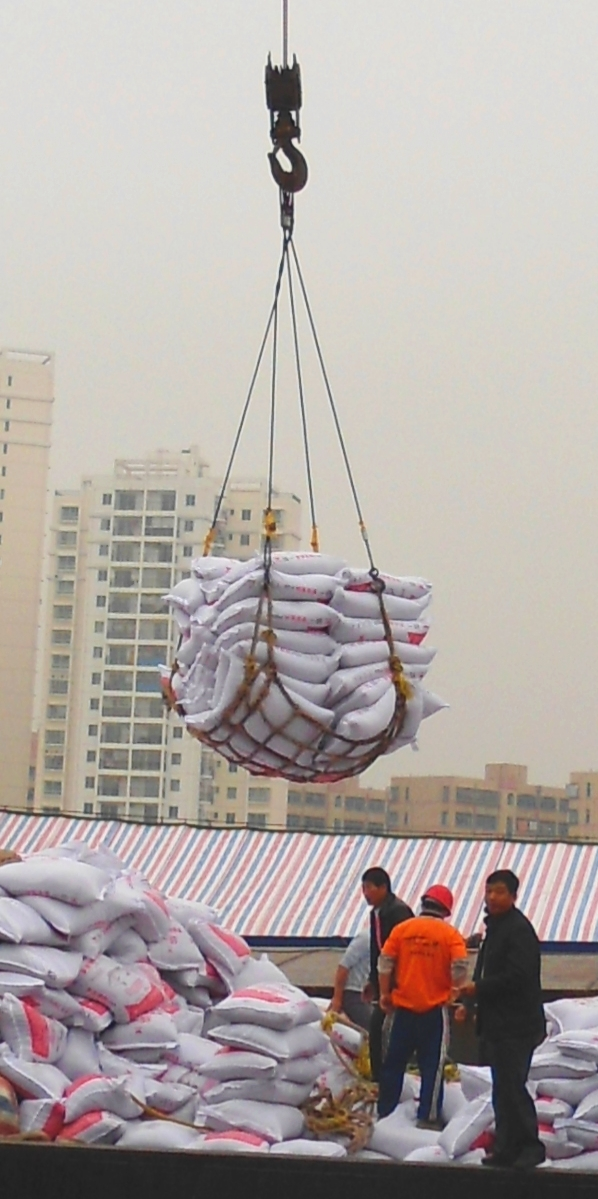
Cargo being unloaded from a ship using a cargo net at Haikou New Port, Haikou City, Hainan, China

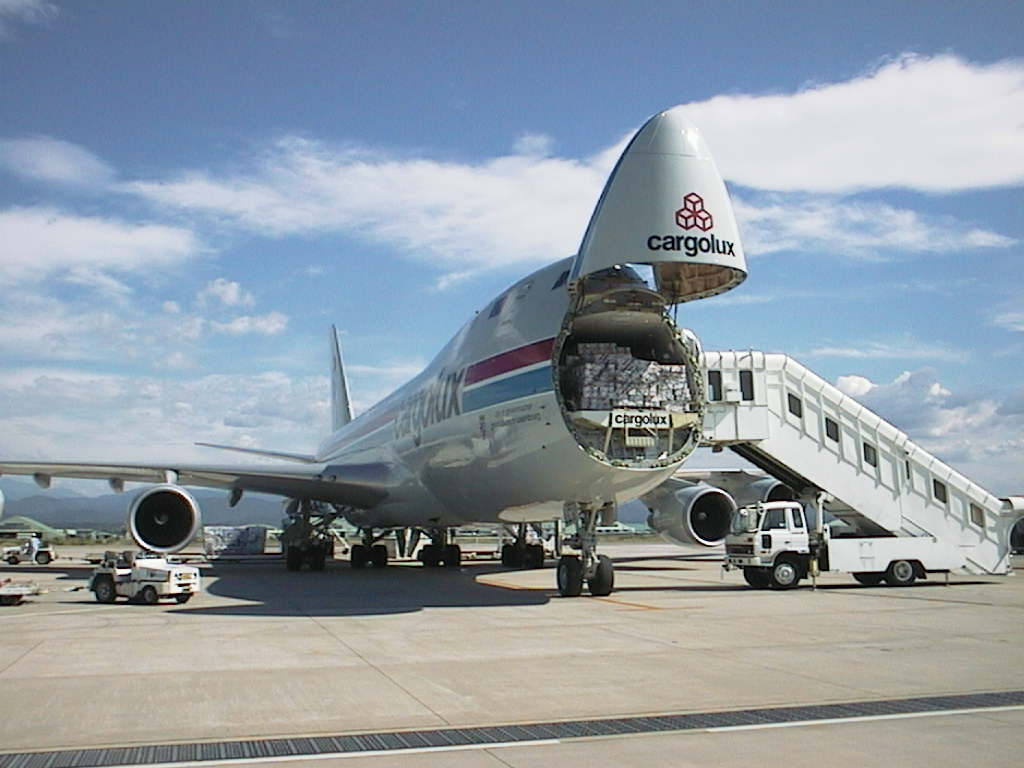
Cargolux Boeing 747-400F with the nose loading door open

A parcel is an individual consignment of cargo for shipment. Is the unit used in the daily practice for sending and receiving all kinds of cargo. It may have all shapes and sizes. The size can range from an actual mail parcel to 100 boxes of wine, with a top limit, for example, of 4 million barrels cargo of oil large enough to fill a supertanker.

== Parcel sizes ==
Each product has particular parcel size in which may be transported in the most economical way. This is expressed as parcel size distribution. Thus, the parcel size distribution size for coal it's completely different from the size used for ore, for grain or for sugar.

For sea Bulk transport there are given some typical parcel sizes. For coal is between 20,000 and 160,000 tons, but for the majority of cargoes parcel sizes lie between 150,000 and 60,000 tons. Iron ore is transported especially in parcel sizes of 150,000 tons, while with grain sizes are between 60,000 and 25,000 tons. When transporting sugar the most common parcel sizes are around 25,000 tons.

Maximizing parcels to the maximum possible size has helped the economies of scale. This has contributed to the economic growth of the use of great vessels after the World War II.

However, there are a number of factors that limit the parcel size :

- The stock level;
- Available depth;
- Decreasing economies of scale in larger ships.

The transition from bulk to cargo begins when parcel sizes smaller than the carrying capacity of a single ship. The option than is transporting several parcels together, making generally necessary the use of a container, then the transportation costs rise sharply. With the advent of the intermodal containers it has become possible to transport smaller parcels efficiently (loading and unloading), the same way the cargo has also benefit from the economies of scale that had taken place earlier in the bulk transportation.

== See also ==
- Post Office
- Parcel (package)

== Bibliography ==
- Stopford, M. (2009): Maritime economics, 3rd edition, Routledge.
- The container revolution, Dr. Salvatore R. Mercogliano, Sea History nr. 114, year 2006
