= Edward Stopford =

Edward Stopford may refer to:

- Edward Stopford (British Army officer, born 1732) (1732–1796), Anglo-Irish general and politician
- Sir Edward Stopford (British Army officer, born 1766) (1766–1837), Anglo-Irish general and politician, nephew of the above
- Edward Stopford (bishop) (died 1850), bishop of Meath
- Edward Stopford (archdeacon of Meath) (1810–1874), Irish Anglican priest, son of the above
- Edward Stopford Claremont (born Edward Stopford, 1819–1890), British Army general, son of Sir Edward Stopford
