= Louis Wells =

Louis Wells may refer to:

- L. M. Wells (1862–1923), American actor
- Louis T. Wells (born 1937), American organizational theorist
