= Ernest Aldington Hunt =

Australian cleric and teacher, and Archdeacon of Matabeleland

Ernest Aldington Hunt was Archdeacon of Matabeleland from 1942 to 1954.

Hunt was educated at the University of Queensland and ordained in 1920. After a curacy in Numurkah, New South Wales he held incumbencies at Wunghnu and Milawa. He also worked as a school master in Brisbane, Geelong and Toowoomba. He was Vicar of Saint John the Baptist, Newington from 1934 to 1941; a chaplain to the Forces from 1935 to 1942; and of All Saints, Pocklington from 1941 until his appointment as archdeacon.

Anglican Church of Southern Africa titles
Preceded by Michael Gibbs	Archdeacon of Matabeleland; 1942– 1954	Succeeded by John Stopford
