= Henry Stopford =

Irish Anglican cleric

Henry Scott Stopford (1797–1881) was Archdeacon of Leighlin from 1824 until his death.

The fifth son of James Stopford, 3rd Earl of Courtown and his wife Mary, daughter of Henry Scott, 3rd Duke of Buccleuch, he was born at Dalkeith. He was educated at Trinity College, Dublin, and matriculated at Trinity College, Cambridge in 1817, graduating M.A. in 1819. He became rector of Clonmore, County Carlow in 1824 and of Killeban (now Killabban, County Laois) in 1826.
