= Lawrence E. Fouraker =

Lawrence E. Fouraker (October 28, 1923 – December 20, 1997) was the sixth dean of the Harvard Business School (1970–1980).

Born in Bryan, Texas, he attended Texas A&M University for his bachelor's degree and received his PhD from The University of Colorado at Boulder.

== Selected publication ==
Articles

- Fouraker, Lawrence E.; John M. Stopford (June 1968). "Organizational Structure and the Multinational Strategy". Administrative Science Quarterly. 13 (1): 47–64. doi:10.2307/2391261. JSTOR 2391261.
