= Mademoiselle Anaïs =

French actress (1802–1871)

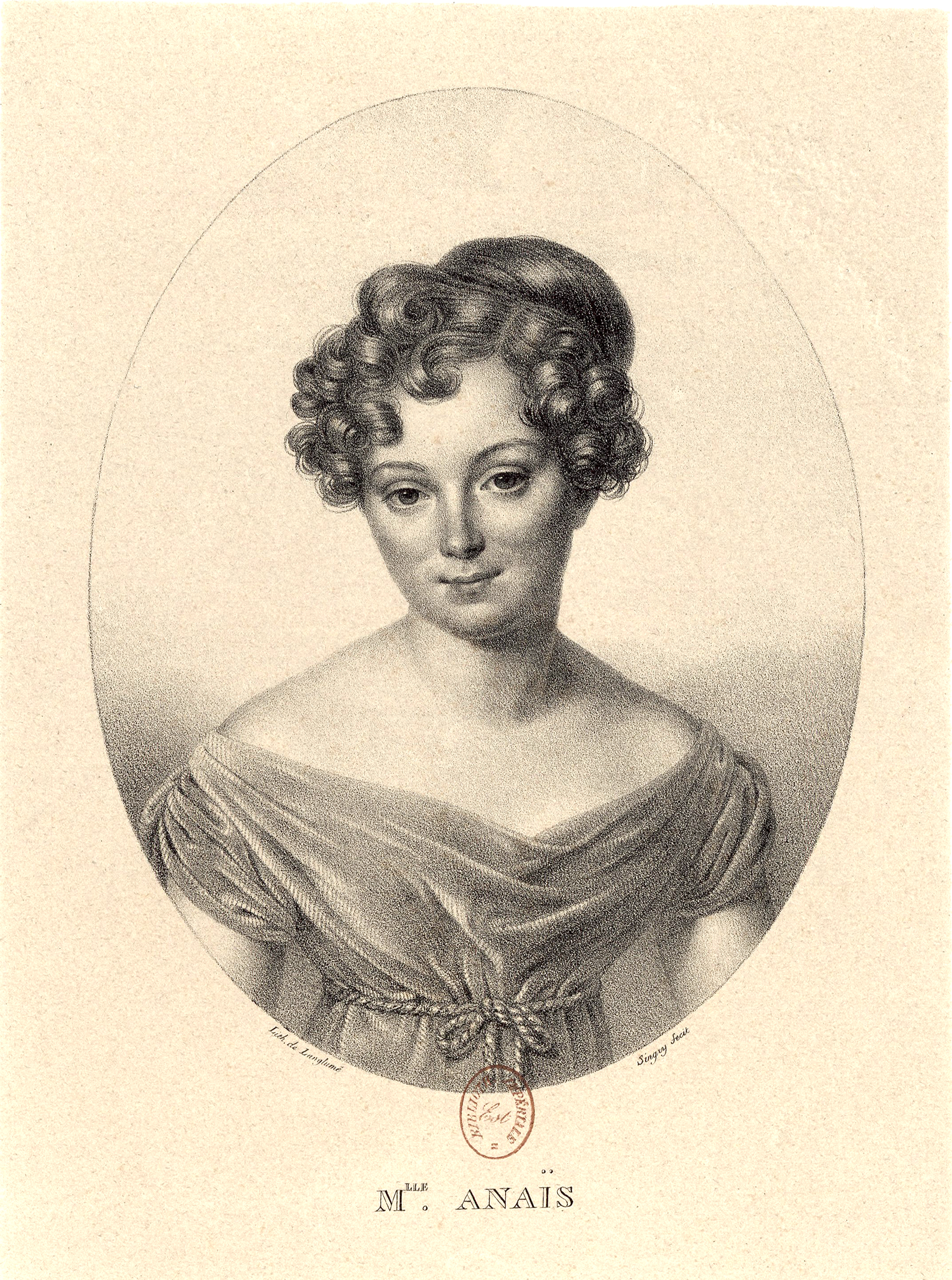
- Portrait de Mademoiselle Anaïs, lithographie de Pierre Langlumé
- Born: 1802; Paris
- Died: 25 July 1871 (aged 68–69); Louveciennes

Anaïs Pauline Nathalie Aubert, known as Mademoiselle Anaïs (1802–1871) was a French actress.

== Biography ==
Anaïs was born in Toury, Eure-et-Loir, and entered the Comédie-Française in 1816 at the age of just fourteen. In 1832 she was chosen to be the 252nd Sociétaire of the Comédie-Française.

She distinguished herself particularly in ingénue parts, becoming famous in the roles of Chérubin in The Marriage of Figaro and Agnès in The School for Wives.

She had an affair with a British Army general and Member of Parliament, Sir Edward Stopford, resulting in the birth in 1819 of a son who also became a British Army general, Edward Stopford Claremont.

She resigned from the Comédie-Française in 1851 and died in 1871, aged 69, at Louveciennes.
