= Lyne-Stephens Mausoleum =

- Lyne-Stephens Mausoleum in 2026

- Location within Wandsworth
- 51.455080°N 0.243993°W
- Location: Grove House, Roehampton Lane, London, SW15 5PJ

History
- Built: 1862–1864
- Built for: Stephens Lyne-Stephens

Site notes
- Architect: William Burn
- Architectural style: Romanesque Revival

Listed Building – Grade II
- Official name: Mausoleum in Grounds of Grove House
- Designated: 7 April 1983
- Reference no.: 1184736

Lyne-Stephens Mausoleum is a mausoleum built for English politician Stephens Lyne-Stephens, reputed to be the 'richest commoner in England.' It is situated on a plot of land that once formed part of the Grove House estate, now incorporated into the grounds of the University of Roehampton. It was listed Grade II on the National Heritage List for England in April 1983.

Built between 1862 and 1864, Stephens, who died in 1860, was interred in the mausoleum on 28 August 1864 following its completion. Stephens' wife, Yolande Marie Louise Lyne-Stephens (née Duvernay), who commissioned the mausoleum following her husband's death, was interred there on 8 September 1894, six days after her own death.

== History ==
Following a series of legal disputes, retired French ballerina Yolande inherited the entirety of her late husband's estate in 1860. She subsequently sought permission to consecrate a half-acre plot of land within the grounds of their home, Grove House, adjoining the cemetery on Barnes Common. The request was submitted in July 1861 and granted in March 1862.

Yolande commissioned her late husband's architect, William Burn, to design an elaborate mausoleum and sarcophagus in the Romanesque Revival style, intended as a final resting place for them both, where they might "remain there forever undisturbed." In December 1862, she placed the land in trust, accompanied by an endowment of £150, stipulating that it should serve as a burial site. The mausoleum cost several thousand pounds to build and was consecrated on 16 August 1864 by Archibald Campbell Tait, Anglican Bishop of London, allowing her husband's remains to be transferred from their temporary burial place at Kensal Green Cemetery. Yolande retained sole authority over any subsequent burials within the mausoleum. Twelve days after the consecration, Stephens' coffin was brought home by a horse-drawn hearse and his reinterment was officiated by the Anglican clergy of Roehampton.

Yolande died on 2 September 1894 from injuries sustained in an earlier fall on a parquet floor. She was interred on 8 September, and placed alongside her husband's larger coffin inside the sarcophagus. Biographer Jenifer Roberts surmises that Yolande might have preferred to be buried outside the mausoleum, in the grave of Edward and Frances Claremont, the former being Yolande's alleged paramour.

== Design ==
Sarcophagus within the Lyne-Stephens Mausoleum

Designed in the Neo-Romanesque style, the mausoleum has a Greek-cross plan, measuring almost 30 square feet (2.8 m^{2}), with four arms topped by gables and finished with Celtic cross finials. A continuous band of stylised foliate entablature runs around the building, while the recessed entrance is flanked by rounded blind arches. Each of the four bull's-eye windows contains stained glass, with the entrance window flanked by two small sculpted heads.

Inside, the walls are decorated with blind arcading, and the floor is laid with patterned tiles. The large white stone sarcophagus is elaborately carved, featuring interlacing Gothic-style arches, sculpted angel heads, and the Lyne-Stephens coat of arms.

== Graves ==
=== Edward and Frances Claremont ===
Tomb of Edward and Frances Claremont

In the spring of 1861, Colonel Edward Stopford Claremont, the British military attaché in Paris, met the widowed Yolande. The two subsequently began a clandestine relationship, adopting the nickname 'Madame and the General,' despite Edward being married with children. Yolande had drawn up an indenture placing the land for the mausoleum at Roehampton in trust and, on 9 December 1862, before Stephens had been interred there, Edward signed the deed of conveyance as a trustee.

Edward refused to divorce his wife Frances 'Fanny' Charlotte Claremont (née Wetherall), and instead lived and holidayed alongside both women in a 'ménage-à-trois.' Despite his refusal to legally separate, he accepted a gold ring from Yolande, which he wore constantly.

By 1890, Edward's health had deteriorated and he died 16 July in Paris. His body was returned to England and, at his request, buried 'in the most unostentatious manner' in the ground in front of the mausoleum. In his will, Edward instructed two of his sons to maintain the mausoleum, and to his 'dear and excellent friend' Yolande, left the 'plain gold ring which I always wear.'

Frances Claremont died two years later, on 29 July, and was buried in her husband's grave outside the mausoleum.

=== Henry and Katherine Claremont ===
Tomb of Henry and Katherine Claremont

Edward's son, Henry 'Harry' Alexander Stopford Claremont, married Katherine 'Kitty' Gregory Walker in 1882. Following his father's death, Henry assumed responsibility for managing Yolande's affairs, although his own health was deteriorating following a diagnosis of tuberculosis. On 24 October 1894, Henry changed his surname to Lyne-Stephens, as stipulated in Yolande’s will. He died a couple of months later, on 30 December 1894, and was buried on 10 January 1895 in a grave close to that of his parents.

Following her husband's death, Katherine moved into Grove House and subsequently remarried. She died on 13 September 1939 and was interred beside her first husband later that year.

Tomb of Stephen Lyne-Stephens (né Claremont)

=== Stephen Claremont ===
On 3 April 1888, Katherine gave birth to a son, Stephen Edward Victor Lyne-Stephens (né Claremont). Stephen served in the Army Service Corps before suffering a nervous breakdown in September 1920 and divorcing his wife and cousin, Joan Elizabeth Northey. He died three years later in a motor racing accident. Katherine arranged for his body to be brought from Dorset to Roehampton, where he was buried in front of the mausoleum steps. He was the only child of Katherine and Henry to be interred on the site.
