= Clarkson plc =

British shipping services company

Clarksons
- Formerly: H. Clarkson (Holdings) Limited (1974–1981); Horace Clarkson plc (1981–2001)
- Company type: Public limited company
- ISIN: GB0002018363
- Industry: Shipping
- Founded: 1852; 174 years ago
- Headquarters: London, United Kingdom (Head office)
- Area served: Global, 63 Offices
- Key people: Laurence Hollingworth (chair); Andi Case (CEO)
- Products: Shipbroking
- Revenue: ▼£631.4 million (2025)
- Operating income: ▼£78.0 million (2025)
- Net income: ▼£66.6 million (2025)
- Website: clarksons.com

Clarkson PLC, trading as Clarksons, is a provider of shipping services, and is headquartered in London. In 2011, Lloyd's List described the company's shipbroking service as the "undisputed heavyweight of the shipbroking market". It is listed on the London Stock Exchange and is a constituent of the FTSE 250 Index.

== History ==
The company was founded by Horace Anderton Clarkson in London in 1852. The son of a prosperous lawyer, he invited Leon Benham, a former colleague, to join him in partnership. Benham's son Henry soon joined the business. In the 1850s the business involved sailing ships, but by the 1860s the company was chartering steam ships. In 1872 Clarksons became shipowners with the acquisition of three schooners. The company became the world's largest tanker broker in 1929 when Esso appointed Clarksons as its exclusive shipbroker.

The first overseas office opened in New York City in 1954. Offices soon followed in France, Australia and Germany, and in the 1960s, South Africa and Greece. Expansion in the Far East began in the 1990s when companies were established in Hong Kong, Shanghai and Singapore.

Carron Greig became joint managing director in 1962, served as chairman of the shipbroking division from 1972 to 1985, and as chairman of the whole group, then known as Horace Clarkson, until his retirement in 1993. He was credited with transforming the group into a world leader in its field. The company became a global force and Greig increased its business, especially with Esso, bringing in Brazil, Norway and the Far East to its portfolio. He also fought off Russian and English corporate raiders in the 1970s.

The company spun off various diversified assets as Shipping Industrial Holdings in 1974. Michael Wade, a prominent insurance executive, sat on the board from 1984 to 1993 and Peter Parker, a leading industrial executive, sat on the board from 1971 until 1993.

Richard Fulford-Smith became chief executive of the company in 2004. According to Robert Wright of the Financial Times, he was central to Clarkson's emergence as the world's largest sale and purchase shipbroker. Fulford-Smith was ousted from the board in 2008 after Russian litigation claims emerged against the company.

Until March 2012, Martin Stopford, a prominent economist, sat on the board and was head of the research arm of the company. In 2013, Clarkson acquired Gibb Tools, a North Sea oil engineering tools supplier, for £12.7 million. In 2015, Clarkson acquired RS Platou AS, a Norwegian headed shipbroking and investment banking group.

== Operations ==
Clarkson operations are divided into four areas: broking, financial, support and research. The company brokers vessels for some of the world's largest producers and traders of natural resources. Clarkson Research Services focuses primarily on the collection, validation, analysis and management of data about the merchant shipping and offshore markets. The chief executive since 2008 has been Andi Case. William (Bill) Thomas held the position of chair between February 2019 and March 2022. Laurence Hollingworth has held a board position since July 2020 and was appointed to chair in March 2022.

The company has its headquarters at Commodity Quay, St Katharine Docks, London.

Clarksons is best known for its shipbroking but also operates port services, and maritime technology services.
