= James Stopford, 4th Earl of Courtown =

Anglo-Irish peer and Tory Member of Parliament

4th Earl of Courtown

High Sheriff of County Wexford
- In office 1833
- Preceded by: James Boyd of Roslare House
- Succeeded by: William Madden Glascott of Alderton House

Member of Parliament for County Wexford
- In office 21 March 1820-19 August 1830 Serving with Robert Shapland Carew
- Preceded by: Robert Shapland Carew and Caesar Colclough
- Succeeded by: Arthur Chichester and Viscount Valentia

Personal details
- Born: 27 March 1794
- Died: 20 November 1858 (aged 64)
- Party: Tory
- Spouse(s): Charlotte Montagu-Scott (m. 1822; died 1828) Dora Pennefather
- Children: 5, including Frederick
- Parents: James Stopford (father); Mary Scott (mother)
- Relatives: Montagu Stopford (brother); Henry Scott (grandfather); Elizabeth Montagu (grandmother); Francis Scott (grandfather); Caroline Campbell (grandmother)
- Education: Christ Church, Oxford

James Thomas Stopford, 4th Earl of Courtown (27 March 1794 – 20 November 1858), known as Viscount Stopford from 1810 to 1835, was an Anglo-Irish peer and Tory Member of Parliament.

== Biography ==
Courtown was the third but eldest surviving son of James Stopford, 3rd Earl of Courtown, and his wife Lady Mary (née Scott), and was educated at Christ Church, Oxford. He was elected to the House of Commons for County Wexford in 1820, a seat he held until 1830. In 1835 he succeeded his father in the earldom and entered the House of Lords. He also served as High Sheriff of County Wexford in 1833 and as custos rotulorum of County Wexford from 1845 to 1858.

Lord Courtown married, firstly, his first cousin Lady Charlotte Albina, daughter of Charles Montagu-Scott, 4th Duke of Buccleuch, in 1822. They had two sons, James and Edward. After her death in February 1828, aged 28, he married, secondly, Dorothea (Dora), daughter of Edward Pennefather, Lord Chief Justice of Ireland and Susanna Darby. They had three sons, of whom the two youngest gained distinction. The Hon. Sir Frederick Stopford was a lieutenant general in the Army and the Hon. Walter George Stopford (1855–1918) was a Rear-Admiral in the Royal Navy. Lord Courtown died in November 1858, aged 64, and was succeeded in the earldom by his son from his first marriage, James. Lady Courtown survived her husband by just over a year and died in December 1859.

== Notes ==
Parliament of the United Kingdom
Preceded by Robert Shapland Carew; Caesar Colclough	Member of Parliament for County Wexford; 1820–1830; With: Robert Shapland Carew	Succeeded by Arthur Chichester; Viscount Valentia
Peerage of Ireland
Preceded by James George Stopford	Earl of Courtown; 1835–1858	Succeeded by James George Henry Stopford
