= William (Archdeacon of Leighlin) =

Irish priest

William was an Irish priest in the early thirteenth century: the brother of Johannes, O.Cist, Bishop of Leighlin from 1198 to 1201, he is the first recorded Archdeacon of Leighlin, holding the office in 1200.
