= Toowoomba Anglican School =

Australian secondary school

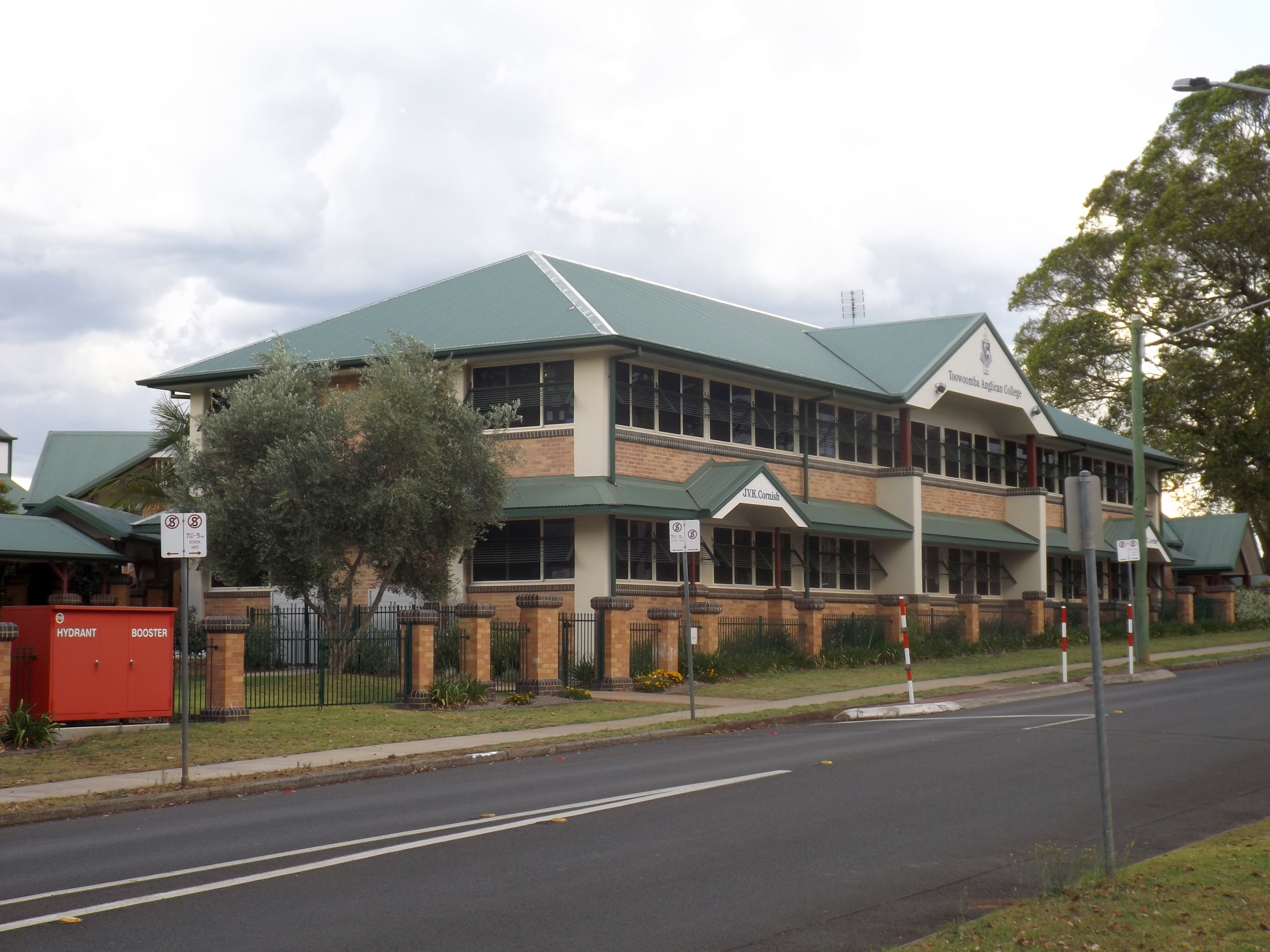

Location
- Toowoomba, Queensland; Australia; 27°33′28″S 151°58′37″E

Information
- Former names: The Toowoomba Grammar Preparatory School; The Church of England Preparatory School; The Church of England Boys School; The Toowoomba Preparatory School; Toowoomba Anglican College and Preparatory School
- Type: Independent co-educational primary and secondary day and boarding school
- Motto: Latin: Sola Nobilitas Virtus
- Religious affiliation: Anglican Diocese of Brisbane
- Denomination: Anglican
- Established: 1911; 115 years ago
- Head of School: Simon Lees
- Enrolment: 650
- Campus size: 5-hectare (12-acre)
- Campus type: Regional
- Colours: Gold, navy and maroon
- Affiliation: Junior School Heads Association of Australia
- Website: taschool.qld.edu.au

The Toowoomba Anglican School (formerly Toowoomba Anglican College and Preparatory School) is an independent Anglican co-educational primary and secondary day and boarding school located in Toowoomba, Queensland, Australia. The school is a member of the Anglican Diocese of Brisbane and is affiliated with the Junior School Heads Association of Australia.

== History ==
The school was founded in 1911 as The Toowoomba Grammar Preparatory School. Original enrolment comprised 17 boys. The school was founded and grew with a boarding focus to service the geographically isolated areas of Southern and Western Queensland. The focus on boarding has remained through the school's history.

In 1927 the campus was expanded with the purchase of the adjacent Stoneleigh House, which was used for boarding students. In 1942–43 the School grounds were commandeered by the Army as a result of World War II, and the school was evacuated to Southport on the Gold Coast. In 1972 the enrolment was expanded to become co-educational. In 1986 Stoneleigh House was demolished to make room for sporting facilities. The turret (known as the Bell Tower) was salvaged through the efforts of the Past Students Association, and to this day is sited between the sporting ovals that replaced Stoneleigh.

In 2001 the school's board was subject of a civil case, S v Corporation of the Synod of the Diocese of Brisbane [2001] QSC 473, involving sexual offending by a housemaster in the 1990s. The events later formed the basis of the 2017 film Don't Tell.

== Heads of school ==
The following is a lead of heads of the school:

Ordinal	Officeholder	Title	School name	Term start	Term end	Time in office	Notes
1	Ernest Albert Gill		The Toowoomba Grammar Preparatory School; The Church of England Preparatory School	1911	1926	14–15 years	
2	Rev. Ernest Aldington Hunt		The Church of England Boys School	1927	1928	0–1 years	
3	Norman Scott "Boss" Connal OBE	Headmaster	The Church of England Boys School	1929	1958	28–29 years	
4	Edgar "Blue" White		The Church of England Boys School	1959	1973	13–14 years	
5	Robert "Bob" Smith		The Church of England Preparatory School	1973	1979	5–6 years	
6	Robert Brewster		The Toowoomba Preparatory School	1979	1992	12–13 years	
7	Tim Waley		The Toowoomba Preparatory School	1993	1995	1–2 years	
8	Bruce Howden OAM		The Toowoomba Preparatory School	1995	2009	13–14 years	
9	Sandra Hawken		The Toowoomba Preparatory School	2010	2013	2–3 years	
10	Simon Lees	Head of School	Toowoomba Anglican College and Preparatory School; Toowoomba Anglican School	2014	2025	11–12 years	
11	Nick Johnstone	Principal	Toowoomba Anglican School	2025		current	

== Houses ==
The school has a day house system for internal competition, and a different house system for boarding.

There are three-day houses: Gill (maroon), Connal (gold) and Fairfax (navy).

== Sports ==
Sports offered at the school include AFL, athletics, basketball, cricket, cross country, soccer, futsal, rugby union, rugby league, hockey, netball, softball, swimming, tennis, touch football, and volleyball.

Sporting facilities at the school include three junior-sized ovals, four tennis, and netball courts, an outdoor pool, and a gymnasium (which also acts as the School's assembly hall).

== Notable alumni ==
All previous students are able to join the Past Students Association. Notable alumni include:

- Air Vice Marshal Don Bennett CB, CBE, DSO, (1919–20)
- Charles Copeman AM, Rhodes Scholar 1953; mining industrialist (1941–42)
- Sally Kehoe, an Olympic rower (1992–98)
- Pippa Savage, a national rower (1988–93)

== See also ==
- List of schools in Queensland
- List of boarding schools in Australia
- List of Anglican schools in Australia
