= Landing at Suvla Bay =

1915 World War I amphibious landing

- Part of the Gallipoli campaign of Middle Eastern theatre of World War I
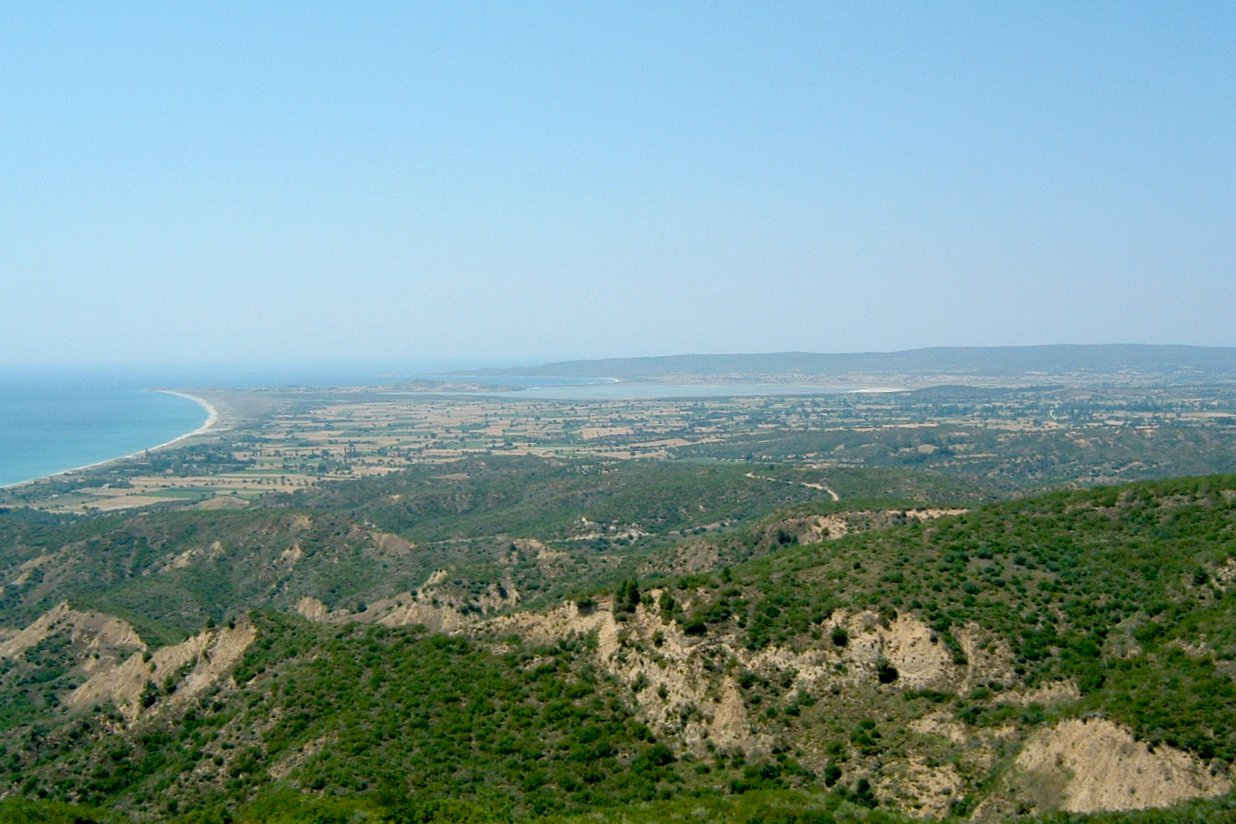
- Suvla Bay, from Battleship Hill in the south
Date	6–15 August 1915
Location	Suvla, Gallipoli peninsula, Adrianople Vilayet, Ottoman Empire 40°18′19″N 26°13′42″E
Result	Ottoman victory

Belligerents
British Empire: United Kingdom; India; Newfoundland; Australia (minor)	Ottoman Empire

Commanders and leaders
(British Empire) Frederick Stopford	(Ottoman Empire) Mustafa Kemal (Ottoman Empire) Cevat Pasha (German Empire) Otto Liman von Sanders

Units involved
IX Corps	Gallipoli and Bursa Gendarmerie Battalions (initial); 7th Division; 12th Division

Strength
2 divisions (initial); 27,000 men (final)	1,500 men (initial); 5 divisions (final)

Casualties and losses
21,500	9,000–20,000

The landing at Suvla Bay was an amphibious landing made at Suvla on the Aegean coast of the Gallipoli peninsula in the Ottoman Empire as part of the August Offensive, the final British attempt to break the deadlock of the Battle of Gallipoli. The landing, which commenced on the night of 6 August 1915, was intended to support a breakout from the ANZAC sector, five miles (8 km) to the south.

Although initially successful, against only light opposition, the landing at Suvla was mismanaged from the outset and quickly reached the same stalemate conditions that prevailed on the Anzac and Helles fronts. On 15 August, after a week of indecision and inactivity, the British commander at Suvla, Lieutenant-General Sir Frederick Stopford, was dismissed. His performance in command is often considered one of the most incompetent feats of generalship of the First World War.

== Prelude ==
On 7 June 1915, the Dardanelles Committee met in London and, under the guidance of Lord Kitchener, decided to reinforce the Mediterranean Expeditionary Force of General Sir Ian Hamilton with three New Army divisions. Two more Territorial Army divisions were allocated later in the month, giving Hamilton the numbers required to reinvigorate the campaign. A long-standing plan to break out of the Anzac bridgehead was adopted; it had first been proposed on 30 May by the commander of the Australian and New Zealand Army Corps, Lieutenant-General William Birdwood.

However, just as the original landing site at Helles in April had insufficient space to land all the troops available, and so a secondary landing was to be made north of Gaba Tepe, now in July there was insufficient room to accommodate all the new troops within the congested Anzac perimeter, nor was there room to manoeuvre them in battle, and so a new landing at Suvla was planned which would link up with the forces at Anzac.

The Suvla landing was to be made by the newly formed British IX Corps, initially comprising two brigades of the 10th (Irish) Division and the entire 11th (Northern) Division. Command of IX Corps was given to Lieutenant-General Sir Frederick Stopford. British military historian J. F. C. Fuller said of Stopford that he had "no conception of what generalship meant" and indeed he was appointed not on his experience (he had seen little combat and had never commanded men in battle) or his energy and enthusiasm (he was aged 61 and had retired in 1909) but because of his position on the list of seniority. Hamilton had requested either Lieutenant-General Julian Byng or Lieutenant-General Henry Rawlinson, both experienced Western Front corps commanders, but both were junior to Lieutenant-General Sir Bryan Mahon, commander of the 10th Division. The only available generals of appropriate seniority were Spencer Ewart whom Hamilton thought too "stout of girth" and lacking recent experience with troops, and Stopford who was selected by a process of elimination.

== Planning ==
The offensive was to open on 6 August 1915 with diversions at Helles (the Battle of Krithia Vineyard) and Anzac (the Battle of Lone Pine). The landing at Suvla was to commence at 10:00 pm, an hour after the two assaulting columns had broken out of Anzac heading for the Sari Bair heights. The original plan at Suvla was to put the 11th Division ashore south of Nibrunesi Point, the southern headland of the bay, as it was not considered safe to land in the dark within the bay itself where there were uncharted shoals. The 30th and 31st Brigades of the 10th Division would land the following morning. The objective of IX Corps was to seize the ring of hills that surrounded the Suvla plain; Kiretch Tepe to the north along the Gulf of Saros, Tekke Tepe to the east and the Anafarta Spur to the south-east.

When Stopford was first shown the plan on 22 July he declared, "It is a good plan. I am sure it will succeed and I congratulate whoever has been responsible for framing it." Stopford's chief-of-staff, Brigadier General Hamilton Reed was not so supportive and his doubts and prejudices succeeded in swaying Stopford. Reed was an artillery officer who had won the Victoria Cross during the Boer War. Having served on the Western Front, he believed no assault on entrenched positions could be made without artillery support. Reconnaissance had revealed no prepared fortifications at Suvla and yet Stopford proceeded to limit the objectives of the landing and Hamilton failed to stop him. The final orders issued by Stopford and the 11th Division commander, Major General Frederick Hammersley, were imprecise, requiring only that the high ground be taken "if possible".

Stopford and Reed also wanted the 34th Brigade of the 11th Division to be landed within Suvla Bay itself. Unlike the April landings, IX Corps was supplied with purpose-built landing craft known as "Beetles" which were armoured and self-propelled. This fleet of landing craft was commanded by Commander Edward Unwin who had captained the SS River Clyde during the April landing on V Beach at Cape Helles.

The commander of the Fifth Army, General Otto Liman von Sanders, was well aware a new landing was imminent through reports of troop build-ups in the Greek islands, however he was unsure of where the landing would be made. British deceptions made a landing on the Asian shore possible so three divisions were located there while three more were stationed 30 miles (48 km) north of Suvla at Bulair on the neck of the peninsula. Suvla was defended by three battalions, the "Anafarta Detachment", under the command of a Bavarian cavalry officer, Major Wilhelm Willmer, whose task was to delay any enemy advance until reinforcements arrived. Willmer had no machine guns and few field artillery pieces. Willmer constructed three strong points; one on Kiretch Tepe to the north, one on Hill 10 in the centre and one on Chocolate Hill, near the southern end of the salt lake that lay behind the beach. Small pickets were positioned elsewhere, including on Lala Baba, a small hill between the beach and the salt lake.

When the attack at Lone Pine commenced, Willmer was ordered to send one battalion as reinforcements so that when 20,000 British began landing at Suvla, they were opposed by only 1,500 Ottoman soldiers.

== Landing ==
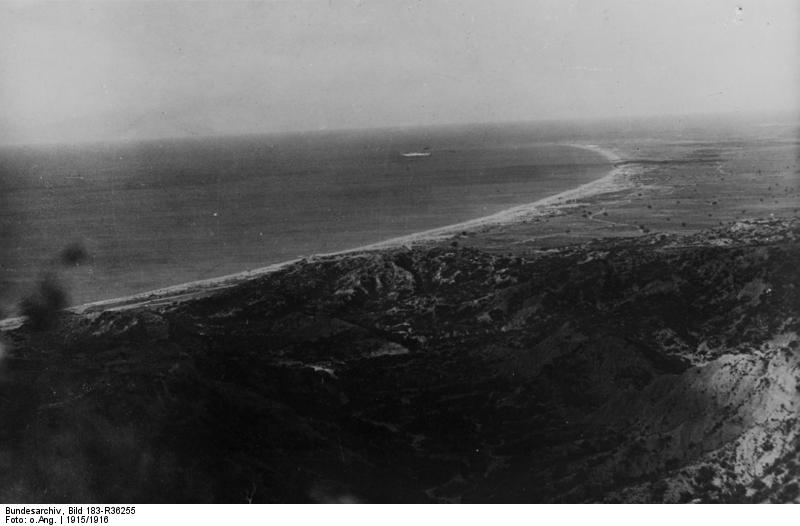
Suvla Bay in 1915

The 32nd and 33rd Brigades of the 11th Division began to come ashore at "B Beach" south of Nibrunesi Point shortly before 10 pm. In the first action fought by a New Army unit, two companies from the 6th Battalion, The Yorkshire Regiment, drove the Ottoman defenders off the small hillock of Lala Baba which overlooked the beach. In doing so, the British took heavy casualties, with all but two of the Yorkshires' officers being killed or wounded, along with one third of the unit's other ranks.

Shortly afterwards the 34th Brigade attempted to land at "A Beach" within Suvla Bay but the landing went awry from the start. The destroyers conveying the brigade anchored 1,000 yards (910 m) too far south, facing shoal water and on the wrong side of the channel that drained the salt lake into the bay. Two lighters grounded on reefs and the men had to wade ashore submerged up to their necks. The 9th Battalion Lancashire Fusiliers waded ashore in darkness and were pinned down between the beach and the salt lake by sniper fire and shelling. The CO was shot in the head around dawn and 9th Battalion lost 6 other officers killed and 7 wounded. The 11th Battalion, The Manchester Regiment, having come ashore from the destroyer HMS Grampus, had the greatest success of the landing, managing to find its way to the Kiretch Tepe ridge and fight its way some distance along it to the east for the loss of 200 casualties.

Elsewhere the landing was in chaos, having been made in pitch darkness which resulted in great confusion with units becoming mixed and officers unable to locate their position or their objectives. Later, when the moon rose, the British troops became targets for Ottoman snipers. Attempts to capture Hill 10 failed because no one in the field knew where Hill 10 was. Shortly after dawn it was found and taken, the Ottoman rearguard having withdrawn during the night.

Stopford had chosen to command the landing from HMS Jonquil but as the landing was in progress, he went to sleep. The first news he received was when Commander Unwin came aboard at 4 am on 7 August to discourage further landings in Suvla Bay.

British war correspondent Ellis Ashmead-Bartlett witnessed the landing shortly after dawn from the transport Minneapolis. While he could hear the fighting continuing at Anzac, Suvla was comparatively quiet and "no firm hand appeared to control this mass of men suddenly dumped on an unknown shore." The British official history, written by Captain Cecil Aspinall-Oglander who was on Hamilton's staff, was blunt in its assessment; "It was now broad daylight and the situation in Suvla Bay was verging on chaos."

The Royal Australian Naval Bridging Train, a 300-strong engineering and construction unit (and the only Australian presence at Suvla), landed early in the first day, but was left without orders until late in the afternoon, when they were set to building piers to receive the men and supplies of the later stages of the landing.

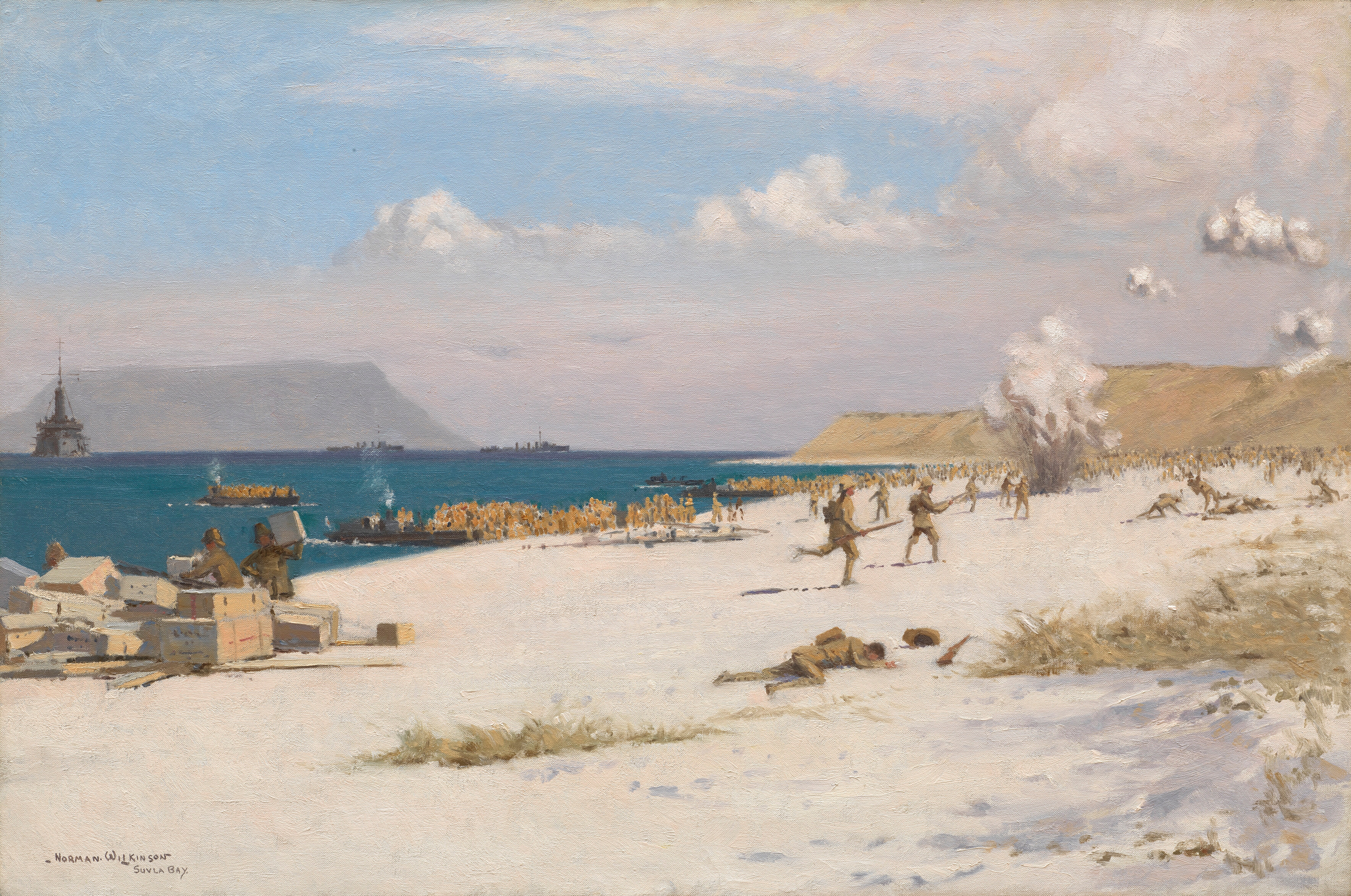
Painting by Norman Wilkinson Troops Landing on C Beach, Suvla Bay, Later in the Day, 7th August 1915

Progress on 7 August was minimal. The two brigades of the 10th Division came ashore, adding to the confusion. In the heat of the day, the soldiers became desperate for drinking water. Towards evening two hills east of the salt lake were captured; these represented the sole gains for the first day ashore at Suvla. IX Corps had suffered 1,700 casualties in the first 24 hours, a figure exceeding the total size of Willmer's detachment. At 7 pm, Willmer was able to report to Von Sanders: "No energetic attacks on the enemy's part have taken place. On the contrary, the enemy is advancing timidly."

Von Sanders now ordered two divisions from Bulair, the Ottoman 7th Division and Ottoman 12th Division, under the command of Feizi Bey, to move south to Suvla.

Stopford did not go ashore from Jonquil on 7 August. By the end of the day, the British chain of command had completely broken down.

== Lethargy ==
Stopford was satisfied with the results of the first day. On the morning of 8 August, he signalled Hamilton:

"Major-General Hammersley and troops under him deserve great credit for the result attained against strenuous opposition and great difficulty. I must now consolidate the position held."

He had no intention of advancing to the high ground. The British staff had estimated that it would take the Ottoman divisions at Bulair 36 hours to reach Suvla – they could be expected to arrive on the evening of 8 August. Hamilton was dismayed by the lack of progress so far and the absence of any drive from Stopford or his subordinates. He had already dispatched Captain Aspinall to discover first-hand what was happening at Suvla. Aspinall was accompanied by Lieutenant-Colonel Maurice Hankey, Secretary to the Committee of Imperial Defence, who was to report on the progress of the campaign to the British Cabinet. When he received Stopford's signal, Hamilton decided to see Suvla for himself.

Aspinall and Hankey initially found the ease and inactivity at Suvla encouraging, assuming it meant the fighting was now far away amongst the hills. Once on the beach, they were warned to keep their heads down as the front line was only a few hundred yards away – and that Stopford was still aboard the Jonquil. Aspinall found Stopford "in excellent spirits", well satisfied with progress. When Aspinall pointed out that the men had not reached the high ground, Stopford replied, "No, but they are ashore."

Aspinall and Hamilton both converged on the light cruiser HMS Chatham, the flagship of Rear-Admiral John de Robeck who commanded the landing fleet. Finally, on the afternoon of 8 August, nearly two days after the landing commenced, Hamilton gained a clear picture of events. Accompanied by Aspinall and Commodore Roger Keyes, he crossed to the Jonquil to confront Stopford who had finally been ashore to consult with Hammersley.

Stopford and Hammersley planned to order an advance the following morning, 9 August. Hamilton insisted that an advance be made immediately and so, at 6.30 pm, the 32nd Brigade was ordered to march two and a half miles to the Tekke Tepe ridge. The march, in darkness over unfamiliar, rough terrain, was difficult and the brigade did not approach the summit until 4 am on 9 August. The Ottoman reinforcements had reached the ridge shortly before them and met the exhausted British infantry with a bayonet charge. The 32nd Brigade was virtually annihilated in a matter of minutes and the remnants of the battalions scattered back towards the beach.

Hamilton had watched the battle from the Triad. He wrote in his diary:

"My heart has grown tough amidst the struggles of the peninsula but the misery of this scene wellnigh broke it... Words are of no use."

== Dismissal ==
Feizi Bey's troops began to arrive, as expected by the British, on the evening of 8 August. Von Sanders wanted to attack immediately but Feizi Bey objected, saying that the men were exhausted and without artillery support, so Von Sanders dismissed him. In his place he put Mustafa Kemal, the commander of the Ottoman 19th Division, which had been fighting at Chunuk Bair. Kemal assumed authority over the "Anafarta section" which spanned from Suvla south to Chunuk Bair.

Kemal, who had proved aggressive and capable at ANZAC, held the high ground and was content to remain on the defensive at Suvla while he dealt with the threat to the Sari Bair ridge. The intensity of the fighting escalated at Suvla on 9 August but the opportunity for the British to make a swift advance had now disappeared. Around midday the gunfire set scrub alight on Scimitar Hill, and Ashmead-Bartlett, watching from Lala Baba, saw the British wounded trying to escape the flames:

"I watched the flames approaching and the crawling figures disappear amidst dense clouds of black smoke. When the fire passed on little mounds of scorched khaki alone marked the spot where another mismanaged soldier of the King had returned to mother earth."

Reinforcements were arriving, the 53rd (Welsh) Infantry Division had started coming ashore on the night of 8 August, and the 54th (East Anglian) Division arrived on 10 August, but command remained paralysed. Some of the reasons that Stopford gave for his inaction were surreal, such as that the Ottomans were "inclined to be aggressive."

Hamilton finally cabled Kitchener that the IX Corps generals were "unfit" for command. Kitchener swiftly replied on 14 August, saying:

"If you should deem it necessary to replace Stopford, Mahon and Hammersley, have you any competent generals to take their place? From your report I think Stopford should come home. This is a young man's war, and we must have commanding officers that will take full advantage of opportunities which occur but seldom. If, therefore, any generals fail, do not hesitate to act promptly. Any generals I have available I will send you."

Before receiving a response, Kitchener made Lieutenant-General Julian Byng available to command IX Corps. On 15 August Hamilton dismissed Stopford and, while Byng was travelling from France, replaced him with Major-General Beauvoir De Lisle, commander of the British 29th Division at Helles. Hammersley was also dismissed but Hamilton intended to retain Mahon in command of the 10th Division. However, Mahon was incensed that de Lisle, whom he disliked, was appointed above him and quit, saying "I respectfully decline to waive my seniority and to serve under the officer you name." He abandoned his division while it was in the thick of the fighting on Kiretch Tepe. The commander of the 53rd (Welsh) Infantry Division, Major-General John Lindley, voluntarily resigned.

== Aftermath ==
General Stopford is blamed for the failure of the Suvla operation but responsibility ultimately lay with Lord Kitchener who, as Secretary of State for War, had appointed the elderly and inexperienced general to an active corps command, and with Sir Ian Hamilton who accepted Stopford's appointment and then failed to impose his will on his subordinate. On 13 August Hamilton had written in his diary, "Ought I have resigned sooner than allow generals old and inexperienced to be foisted up on me." By then it was too late and Stopford's departure contributed to Hamilton's downfall which came on 15 October when he was sacked as the commander of the Mediterranean Expeditionary Force.

Under General de Lisle's command, the Suvla front was reorganized and reinforced with the arrival of the 29th Division from Helles and the 2nd Mounted Division from Egypt (minus their horses). The fighting climaxed on 21 August with the Battle of Scimitar Hill, the largest battle of the Gallipoli campaign. When it too failed, activity at Suvla subsided into sporadic fighting until it was evacuated by the British in late December. Conditions during the summer had been appalling because of heat, flies, and lack of sanitation. On 15 November there was a deluge of rain and again on 26/27 November a major rainstorm flooded trenches up to 4 feet deep. This was succeeded by a blizzard of snow and two nights of heavy frost. At Suvla, 220 men drowned or froze to death and there were 12,000 cases of frostbite or exposure. In surprising contrast to the campaign itself, the withdrawals from Gallipoli were well planned and executed, with many successful deceptions to prevent the Turks realising that withdrawals were taking place. Minimal losses were experienced, and many guns and other equipment were also taken off.

English physicist Henry Moseley, famous for the discovery of the atomic number, died in this battle to a sniper bullet.

== Air actions ==
Following the appointment of Wing Captain Frederick Sykes to the command of Royal Naval Air Service units in the eastern Mediterranean in July 1915, plans were put in place for air reinforcements to be made available to Sykes. However, the landing at Suvla Bay began before the reinforcements arrived. Nonetheless, Sykes's aviators did succeed in destroying several Ottoman ships which hindered the resupply of Ottoman troops. This interdiction forced the Ottomans to depend on land resupply over an extended route. While this did have a diminishing effect on Ottoman ammunition stocks, the failure to close the land routes meant that it was not decisive.

== Commemoration ==
The landing has been commemorated in song on several occasions. Two of the best-known songs contain historical contradictions that confuse the landings at Suvla and Anzac.

A song "Suvla Bay," which is believed to have been written during World War I but first copyrighted and published in 1944, has been recorded by many artists. It tells the story of an Australian girl who receives the news that her sweetheart or husband has been killed at Suvla. However, in a recurring line the song implies that he was killed in April, four months before the Suvla landing. He might have been killed at some point after the April landing at Anzac, but not at Suvla; there was no one there who had "played their part" in April.

Suvla Bay is ostensibly the setting for the song And the Band Played Waltzing Matilda, written by Eric Bogle in 1971, although Bogle admits to having changed the location from Anzac Cove to Suvla, for several reasons, one of them being that he found many Australians mistakenly believed that the ANZAC landing had taken place at Suvla. The song has been recorded by numerous artists, including the Clancy Brothers, Joan Baez, the Pogues, The Dubliners, June Tabor and Nathan Lay.

In the climax of the Peter Weir movie Gallipoli, the third and final wave of Australian troops at the Battle of the Nek is ordered into a suicidal advance, supposedly to divert Ottoman and German attention from the landing at Suvla, despite rumours that the landing has been successfully completed. The fictional character General Gardiner orders the advance reconsidered, with the line "at Suvla ... the [English] officers are sitting on the beach drinking cups of tea". In fact, the Australian attack at the Nek was a diversion for the New Zealanders' attack on Sari Bair, not the British landing at Suvla.

The Dreadnoughts' album track "The Bay of Suvla" commemorates the battle, although where the men described in the song originate from is not absolutely clear.

Suvla is briefly mentioned in the Irish song "The Foggy Dew", which commemorates the 1916 Easter Rising, and, anatopically, in the song "The Last of the Diggers", by the Australian rock band Midnight Oil on their album The Real Thing.
