= John Stopford, Baron Stopford of Fallowfield =

British peer, physician and anatomist (1888–1961)

The Right Honourable The Lord Stopford of Fallowfield KBE FRCS FRCP FRS

Personal details
- Born: John Sebastian Bach Stopford; 25 June 1888 Hindley Green, Wigan, England
- Died: 6 March 1961 (aged 72) Westmorland, England
- Occupation: Anatomist

John Sebastian Bach Stopford, Baron Stopford of Fallowfield KBE FRCS FRCP FRS (25 June 1888 – 6 March 1961) was a British peer, a physician and anatomist, and a vice-chancellor of the University of Manchester. Lord Stopford was described as "one of the greatest anatomists of [the 20th] century".

== Early life and education ==
Stopford was born in Hindley Green near Wigan, UK. The entry in the registry of births for Wigan, page 92 of volume 8c, 1888, records his birth name as John Sebastian B. Stopford, the son of Thomas Rinch Stopford, a colliery engineer, and his wife Mary (Tyrer) Stopford. He was educated at Liverpool College and Manchester Grammar School. He entered to Manchester University in 1906 to read medicine. He graduated with the degrees of Bachelor of Medicine (MB) and Bachelor of Surgery (ChB) in 1911 with honours.

== Early career ==
Having graduated, Stopford went to Rochdale Infirmary as a house surgeon, and then to Manchester Royal Infirmary as an assistant medical officer. In 1912, he returned to Manchester University as a Junior Demonstrator in Anatomy, working under Prof. Grafton Elliot Smith. He was later promoted to Senior Demonstrator, and received a lectureship in 1915. He also received the degree of Doctor of Medicine (MD) in 1915 with a Gold Medal for a thesis on the supply of blood to the brain.

From 1915 to 1918 during the First World War, he served as a neurologist alongside his lectureship in the military orthopaedic centres. This was firstly to the Second Western General Hospital and secondly to the Grangethorpe Hospital. He began researching sensation in the peripheral nerves during this time, on a budget from the Ministry of Pensions that obtained for ten years.

== Career progression ==
At just 31 years of age, Stopford was promoted to be professor of anatomy at the University of Manchester in 1919 as Prof. Grafton Elliot Smith had moved to University College Hospital in London. During his tenure as professor, he was dean of the medical school twice: between 1923 and 1927, and again between 1931 and 1933. He was also pro vice-chancellor at the university between 1928 and 1930.

Stopford was appointed temporary vice-chancellor for six months in 1934 following the departure of Sir Walter Moberly. He made such a success of his time in the post that his appointment was made permanent, and he held it for a total of twenty-two years. He continued as professor of anatomy alongside his vice-chancellorship until 1938, when he was appointed to a personal chair in environmental neurology. In 1947 he was appointed the first chairman of the Manchester Regional Hospital Board, which he served until 1953. He retired in 1956 and was made an emeritus professor.

Stopford's papers as vice-chancellor of the University of Manchester are held at the University of Manchester Library. The Library also has a small collection of his anatomical papers.

== Personal life ==
Stopford met Lily Allan while they were both undergraduates at Manchester University. The couple were married in 1916 and they had one son, Thomas Stopford, who died in Rhos on Sea.

== House of Lords ==
In 1958 he was nominated under the terms of Life Peerage Act by the Prime Minister to a receive letters patent, which duly arrived by 8 August. He was created Lord Stopford of Fallowfield and introduced on 10 March 1959 to the House of Lords to sit as a Crossbench peer. However during early retirement he had fallen ill. Lord Stopford never made a speech in the House, dying on 6 March 1961.

== Other appointments ==
Stopford held a number of professional appointments during his lifetime, particularly in the field of healthcare within which he had particular experience. A selection of these appointments are below:

- Chairman-elect, University Grants Committee - illness caused his resignation before he assumed office
- Member, General Medical Council
- Chairman, Business Committee, GMC
- Chairman, Universities Bureau of the British Empire
- Vice-Chairman, Trustees of the Nuffield Foundation
- Vice-Chairman, Nuffield Hospital Fund
- Vice-Chairman, Interdepartmental Committee on Medical Schools
- Deputy Chairman, Committee of Vice-Chancellors and Principals
- Vice-President & Life Member, Anatomical Society
- Member, Ministry of Health Advisory Committee on Distinction Awards for Consultants
- Member, Council of the Royal College of Physicians
- Chairman, Manchester Regional Hospital Board
- Chairman, Manchester Royal College of Music.

== Honours ==
Stopford was made a Fellow of the Royal Society (FRS) in 1927; the first medical graduate from Manchester University to receive such an accolade. He was also made Honorary Advisory Anatomist at Manchester Royal Infirmary.

- 1920: Member of the Order of the British Empire (MBE)
- 1927: Fellowship (FRS) - Royal Society
- 1936 Elected to the membership of Manchester Literary and Philosophical Society
- 1937: ScD - University of Dublin
- 1939: ScD - University of Leeds
- 1941: Knighthood
- 1942: Honorary Fellowship (FRCP) - Royal College of Physicians
- 1951: ScD - University of Cambridge
- 1951; 1957: LLD and MA - University of Manchester
- 1953: LLD - University of Liverpool
- 1955: Knight Commander of the Order of the British Empire (KBE)
- 1955: Honorary Fellowship (FRCS) - Royal College of Surgeons
- 1956: Freeman of Manchester
- 1957: DCL - University of Durham
- 1958: Life peerage as Baron Stopford of Fallowfield, of Hindley Green in the County Palatine of Lancaster (created 8 August 1958)

== The Stopford Building, University of Manchester ==
The Medical School (1972) was given the name of the Stopford Building in memory of Lord Stopford. It is on Oxford Road, on the corner of Ackers Street, and occupies a very large site. The former Medical Faculty Library housed within the building is now known as the Stopford Library: it is an outlying library of the University of Manchester Library.
