= John Becher (priest, born 1861) =

Irish Anglican Archdeacon

John Richard Hedges Becher (13 March 1861 – 11 May 1946) was an Anglican Archdeacon in Ireland in the first half of the twentieth century.

Becher was educated at Trinity College, Dublin and ordained in 1886. He began his career with curacies in Dunmore East and Kersal. He held Incumbencies in Kilrush and Lorum. He was Archdeacon of Leighlin from 1922 to 1924; and the Archdeacon of Ossory and Leighlin from 1924 to 1940.
