= Robert Stopford =

Robert Stopford may refer to:

- Robert Stopford (bishop) (1901–1976), British Anglican bishop
- Robert Stopford (politician) (1862–1926), English-born Australian politician
- Robert Stopford (Royal Navy officer) (1768–1847)
- Robert Fanshawe Stopford (1811–1891), Royal Navy officer
