= Mary Stopford, Countess of Courtown (died 1823) =

English noble

The Right Honourable The Countess of Courtown
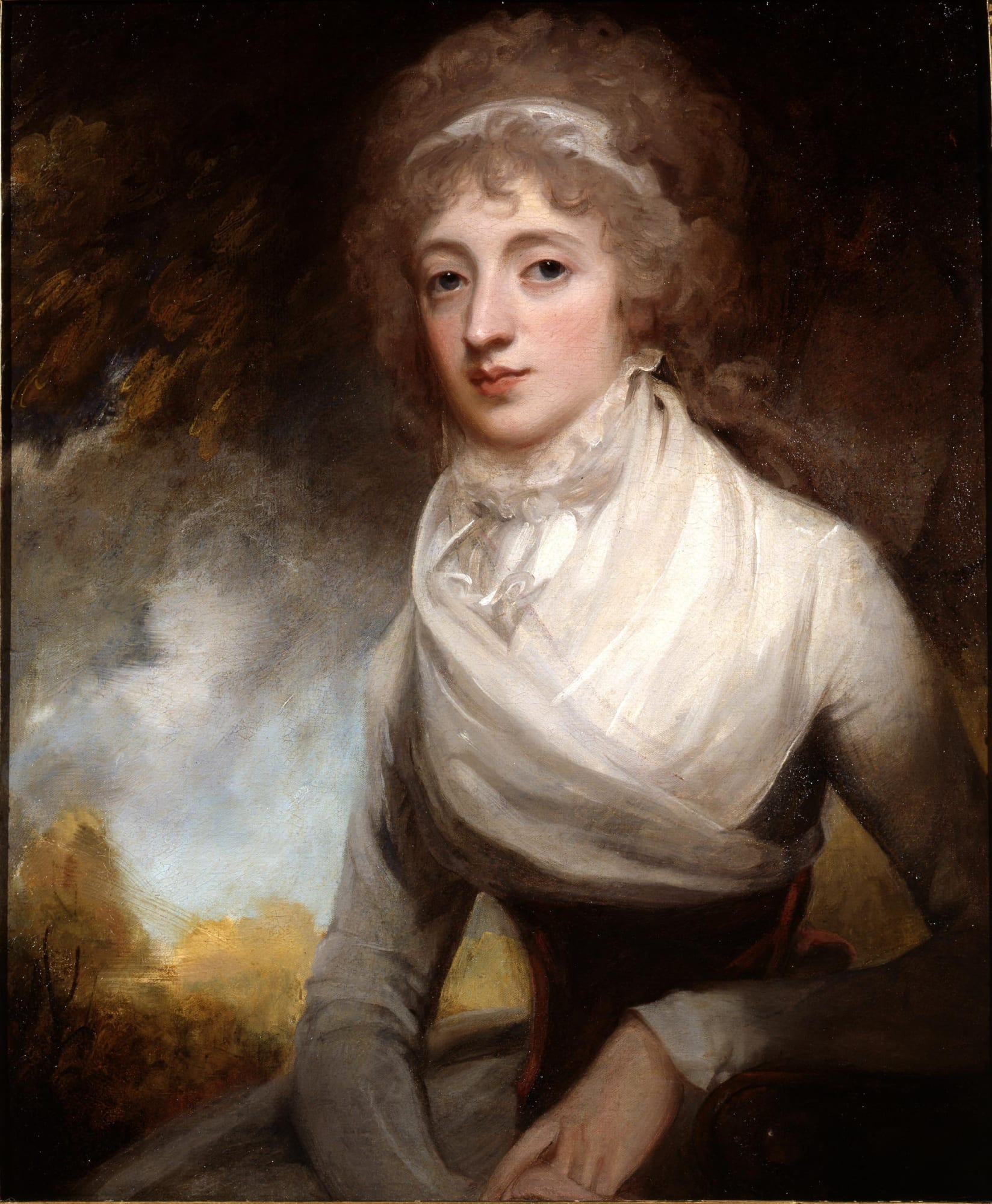
- Portrait of Lady Courtown, by George Romney, 1793
- Born: Lady Mary Scott; 21 May 1769; London, England
- Died: April 1823 (aged 53); Gorey, Ireland
- Spouse: James Stopford (m. 1791)
- Children: 7, including Henry, James and Montagu
- Parents: Henry Scott (father); Elizabeth Montagu (mother)
- Relatives: Charles Montagu-Scott (brother); Henry Montagu-Scott (brother); Francis Scott (grandfather); Caroline Campbell (grandmother); George Brudenell (grandfather); Mary Montagu (grandmother)

Mary Stopford, Countess of Courtown (21 May 1769 – 21 (or 14) April 1823), formerly Lady Mary Scott, was the wife of James Stopford, 3rd Earl of Courtown, and the mother of the 4th Earl.

== Early life ==
Lady Mary was the daughter of Henry Scott, 3rd Duke of Buccleuch, and his wife, the former Lady Elizabeth Montagu. Among her siblings were Charles Montagu-Scott, 4th Duke of Buccleuch and Henry Montagu-Scott, 2nd Baron Montagu.

Her paternal grandparents were Francis Scott, Earl of Dalkeith and Caroline Campbell. Her maternal grandparents were George Montagu, 1st Duke of Montagu and Mary Montagu.

== Personal life ==
On 29 January 1791 at St George's, Hanover Square, London, Lady Mary married James Stopford, Lord Courtown, who was then serving as MP for Great Bedwyn. Together, they were the parents of:

- Lady Jane Stopford (d. 1873), who married the Rev. Abel John Ram.
- Ven. Hon. Henry Scott Stopford (d. 1881), the Archdeacon of Leighlin who married Annette Browne.
- George Henry James Stopford (c. 1791–1792), who died in infancy.
- Charles Stopford (c. 1792–1794), who died in infancy
- James Thomas Stopford, 4th Earl of Courtown (1794-1858), who married Lady Charlotte Albina Montagu-Scott. After her death, he married Dora Pennefather.
- Lt.-Col. Hon. Edward Stopford (1795–1840), who married Horatia Charlotte Lockwood.
- Vice-Adm. Hon. Sir Montagu Stopford (1798–1864), who married Cordelia Winifreda Whitmore. After her death, he married Lucy Cay.

A few years after their marriage, her father arranged for Stopford to become MP for Linlithgow Burghs, even though he was by this time a viscount, his father having inherited the earldom in 1788.

When his father died in 1810, Stopford inherited the earldom and Mary became a countess. Her portrait was painted by George Romney, who recorded sittings for the portrait in 1793. The portrait emphasizes the subject's height and the slenderness of her waist.

The countess predeceased her husband, dying at the family seat, Courtown House, Gorey, County Wexford, Ireland. The house was demolished in 1962. She was buried in the cemetery at Courtown.
