= Richard Powys (MP) =

British politician (died 1743)

Richard Powys (c. 1707 – 10 September 1743) was an English politician. He sat as MP for Orford from 1734 till 1741.

== Family and education ==
He was the only son of Richard Powys (died 1724) of Hintlesham (the principal clerk of the Treasury and half-brother of Sir Littleton Powys and Sir Thomas Powys) by Elizabeth, the daughter of London dyer, John Singleton. He was educated at Westminster School and matriculated at Trinity College, Cambridge in 1724. On 30 May 1735, he married Lady Mary Brudenell, the daughter of George Brudenell, 3rd Earl of Cardigan and they had two daughters.
