= Louis T. Wells =

American academic

Louis Truitt Wells, Jr. (born Oct. 19, 1937) is an American academic, consultant and the Herbert F. Johnson Professor of International Management, Emeritis, at the Harvard Business School. He is known for his work on management of multinational corporations, the economic environment in which they operate, and their relations with governments of developing countries. .

== Life and work ==
Born in Nashville, Tennessee to Louis Truitt Wells and Lila Wilson (Conner) Wells, he grew up in Atlanta, Georgia, and attended Grady High School. Wells obtained his BA in Physics in 1960 from the Georgia Institute of Technology, and his MBA in 1963 and his DBA in 1966 from the Harvard Business School. He also attended the Technische Hochschule in Stuttgart, Germany.

After graduation Wells started his academic career as Assistant Professor of Business Administration at Harvard Business School, and eventually was appointed Herbert F. Johnson Professor of International Management. Over the years he has been a consultant to "governments of a number of developing countries, as well as to international organizations and private firms. His principal consulting activities have been concerned with foreign investment policy and with negotiations between foreign investors and host governments."

He was elected Fellow of the Academy of International Business.

Wells was Coordinator for Indonesia Projects for the Harvard Institute for International Development in Jakarta, Indonesia in the year 1994-95.

His research interests are in the fields of "multinational enterprises; international business-government relations; foreign investment in developing countries; and foreign investment by firms from developing countries."

He is a member of the Advisory Committee for the German-based CONNEX Support Unit, which provides advisors to developing countries for their negotiations with foreign investors in natural resources and infrastructure. AFter his retirement from Harvard, he provided expert testimony in a number arbitrations between foreign investors and host governments.

== Selected publications ==
- Stopford, John M., and Louis T. Wells. Managing the multinational enterprise: Organization of the firm and ownership of the subsidiaries. Vol. 2. New York: Basic Books, 1972.
- Wells, Louis T. Product life cycle and international trade. (1972).
- Vernon, Raymond, and Louis T. Wells. Manager in the international economy. (1976).
- Wells, Louis T. Third world multinationals: The rise of foreign investments from developing countries. MIT Press Books 1 (1983).
- Vernon, Raymond, and Louis T. Wells. The economic environment of international business. Prentice Hall, 1991.
- Wells, Louis T., and Alvin G. Wint. Marketing a country: promotion as a tool for attracting foreign investment. International Finance Corporation, 1999.

Articles, a selection

- Wells Jr, Louis T. "A product life cycle for international trade?." The Journal of Marketing (1968): 1-6.
- Fagre, Nathan, and Louis T. Wells Jr. "Bargaining power of multinations and host governments." Journal of International Business Studies (1982): 9-23.

== Archives and records ==
- Louis T. Wells papers at Baker Library Special Collections, Harvard Business School
