= Grove House, Roehampton =

Coordinates: 51.455087°N 0.24564784°W

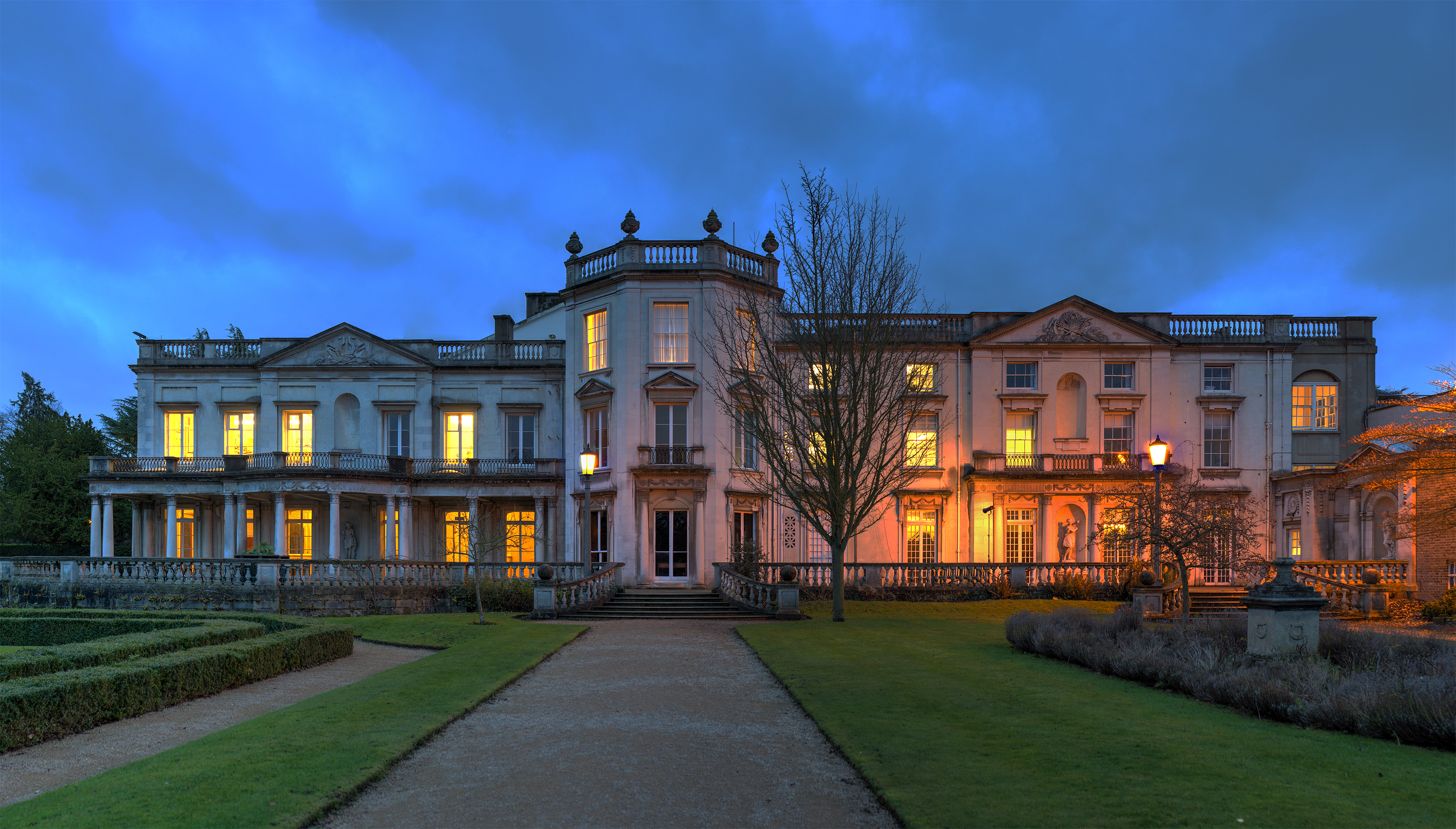
Grove House

Grove House is a Grade II* listed house at Roehampton Lane, Roehampton, London.

It was built in 1777 by James Wyatt for Sir Joshua Vanneck, but has later alterations and additions.

It is part of Froebel College, University of Roehampton.

== Owners and residents ==
Sir Josuah Vanneck (1745–1816) built Grove house soon after his wedding in 1777. He commissioned the famous architect James Wyatt to undertake the task of demolishing the old house on the site and constructing the present building. Sir Joshua was the second son of a wealthy London merchant. His wife was Maria Thompson (1751–1811) who was the daughter of Andrew Thompson of Roehampton. The couple had three sons and two daughters. In 1791 his elder brother died and Joshua inherited the family estates in Heveningham and Huntingfield. The family moved to Heveningham Hall and sold Grove House to Thomas Fitzherbert. He lived there for several years and then sold it to William Gosling in about 1796.

William Gosling (1765–1834) was a wealthy banker in the family firm called Goslings and Sharpe which later became Barclays. When his father died in 1794 he left William a very large fortune. He married twice. His first wife was Margaret Elizabeth Cunliffe, the daughter of Sir Ellis Cunliffe of Liverpool. The couple had three sons and two daughters. She died in 1803 and three years later he married the Honourable Charlotte de Grey daughter of Thomas second Lord Walsingham. They had a son and a daughter. When William died in 1834 he left Grove House to his third son Bennett Gosling (1796–1855) who was a lawyer and banker. He sold the house in 1843 to Charles Lyne Stephens.

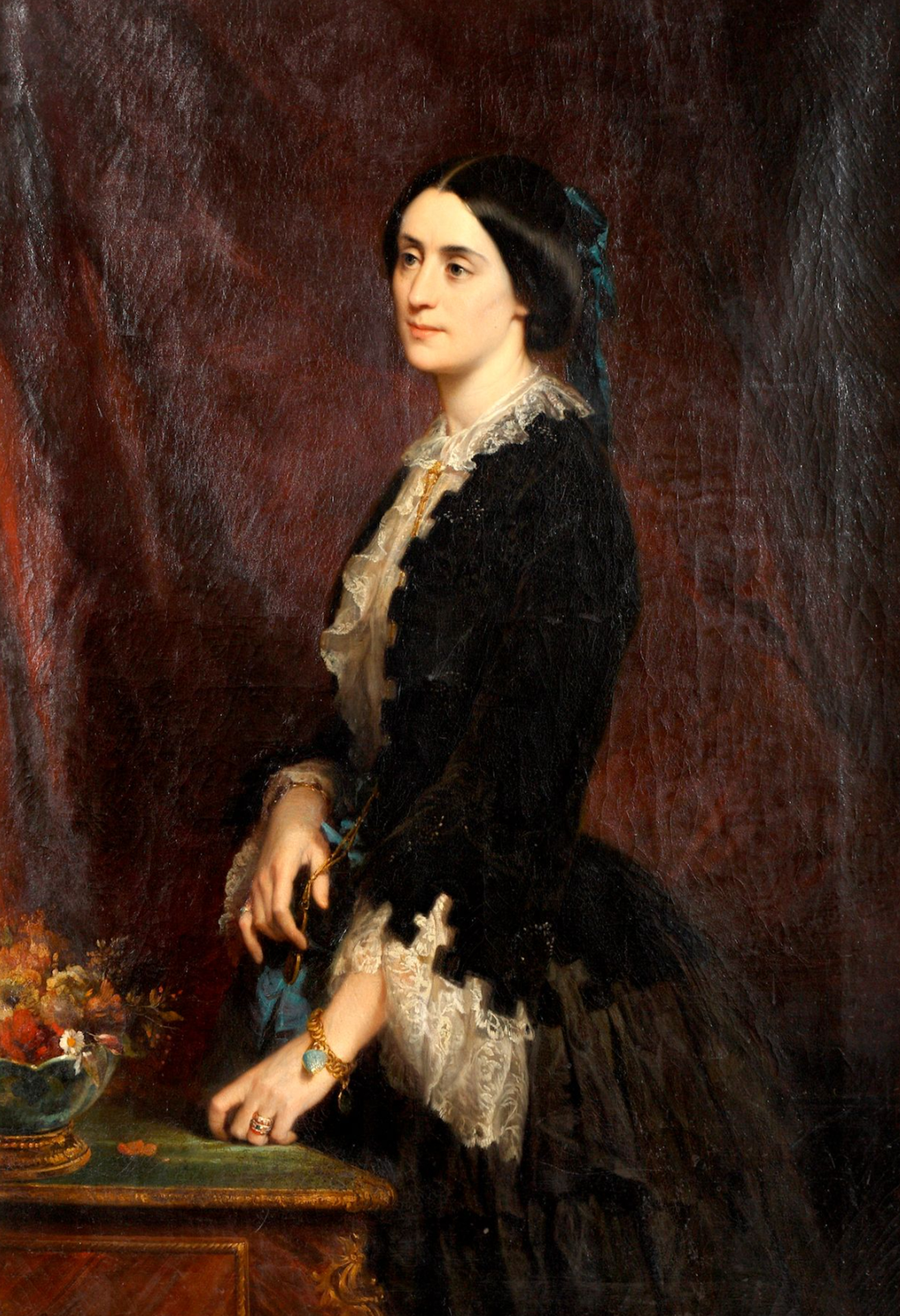
Yolande Lyne Stephens

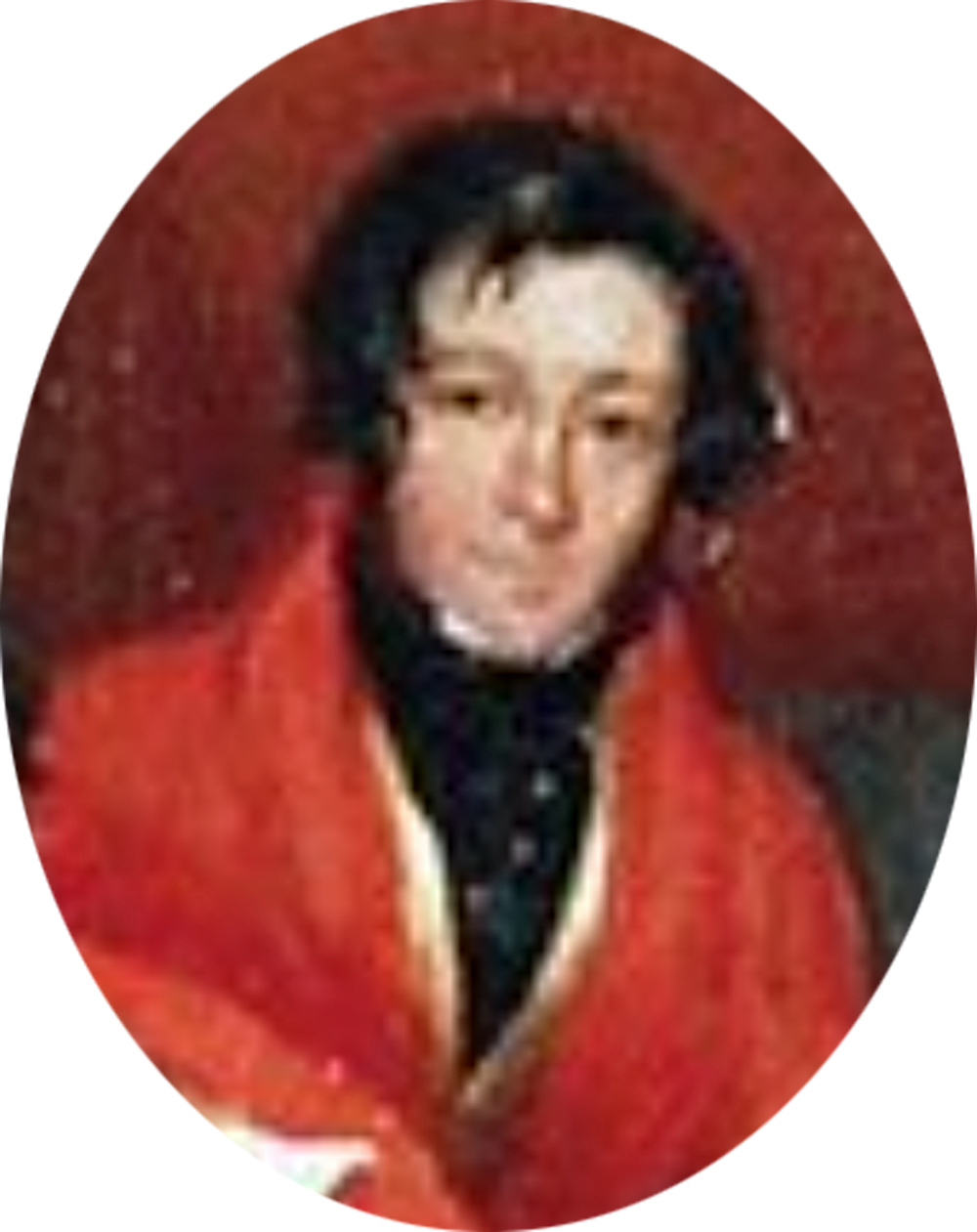
Stephen Lyne Stephens

Charles Lyne Stephens (1764–1851) was born Charles Lyne but when his cousin John James Stephens who was a glass manufacturer died in 1826 and left him his enormous fortune he changed his name to Charles Lyne Stephens in honour of his benefactor. When he died in 1851 he left Grove House to his only surviving son Stephen Lyne Stephens.

Stephen Lyne Stephens (1801–1860) was educated at Cambridge and for a short period was a member of Parliament. However as he was the heir apparent he decided to live the life of a country squire and pursue sports such as horse racing and hunting. He is included in the painting by Sir Francis Grant called “The Melton Hunt Breakfast”. His image from this painting is shown.

In 1845 he married the famous ballerina Yolande Marie-Louise Duvernay (1815–1894). Her portrait painted by Edouard Louis Dubufe is shown. The couple had no children so when Stephen died in 1860 he left Yolande a life interest in his entire estate. She commemorated her husband by building the Lyne-Stephens Mausoleum in the grounds of Grove House. She became a generous benefactor and gave large donations to many institutions. She solely paid for the church of Our Lady and the English Martyrs in Cambridge, one of the largest Catholic churches in the country. When she died in 1894 most of the entailed wealth went to Stephen's relatives but her personal property including Grove house was left to the son of her friend General Edward Stopford Clarement. His son Henry Alexander Stopford Claremont changed his name to Lyne Stephens upon his inheritance.

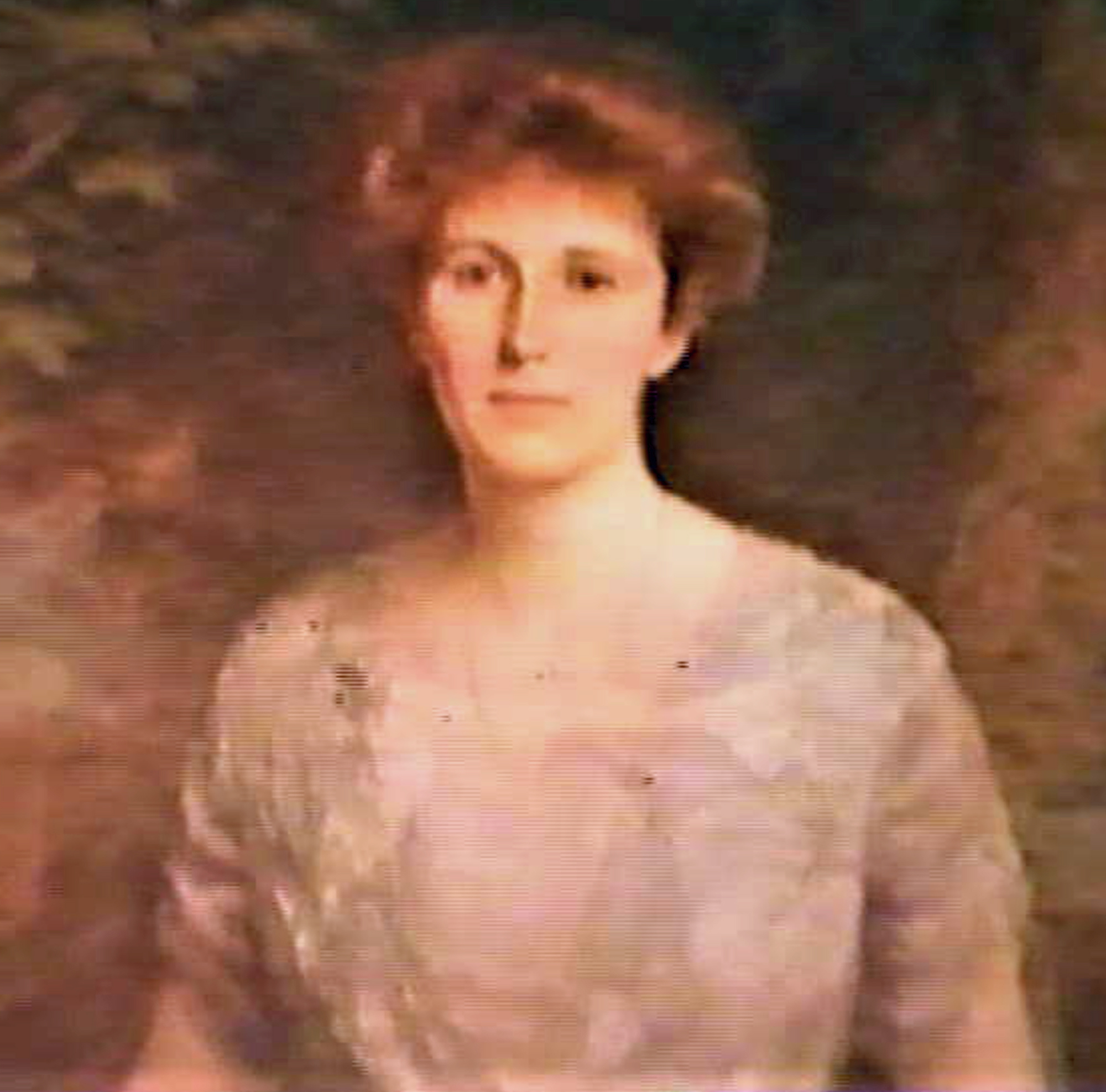
Sybil Lyne Stephens

Henry Alexander Stopford Lyne Stephens (1849–1894) married Katherine Gregory Walker the daughter of Edward Walker, of Henbury Manor, Wimborne, in 1882 and the couple had three daughters and one son. Henry died soon after Yolande in 1894 and left his property to Katherine. Three years later she married Raoul Bedingfeld, a younger son of Sir Henry Paston-Bedingfeld, 6th Baronet. Grove House then passed into the Bedingfield family.

Raoul Bedingfeld (1835–1910) was a Lieutenant Colonel in the army. The 1901 Census records him with his wife Katherine at Grove House with his three step daughters one of whom was Sybil Lyne Stephens. It also records two governesses, two ladies maids, a butler, two footmen and eight other household servants. Sybil later married Raoul's nephew Sir Henry Paston-Bedingfeld, 8th Baronet in 1904. Their wedding was a very lavish event and was widely reported in the newspapers and magazines.

Raoul died in 1910 and his wife Katherine decided to sell the house soon afterwards. The new owner was Charles Louis Fischer who was an American merchant. After the First World War Grove House was auctioned and purchased by the Frobel Educational Institute, in whose hands it remains today.
