= Mary Stopford, Countess of Courtown (died 1810) =

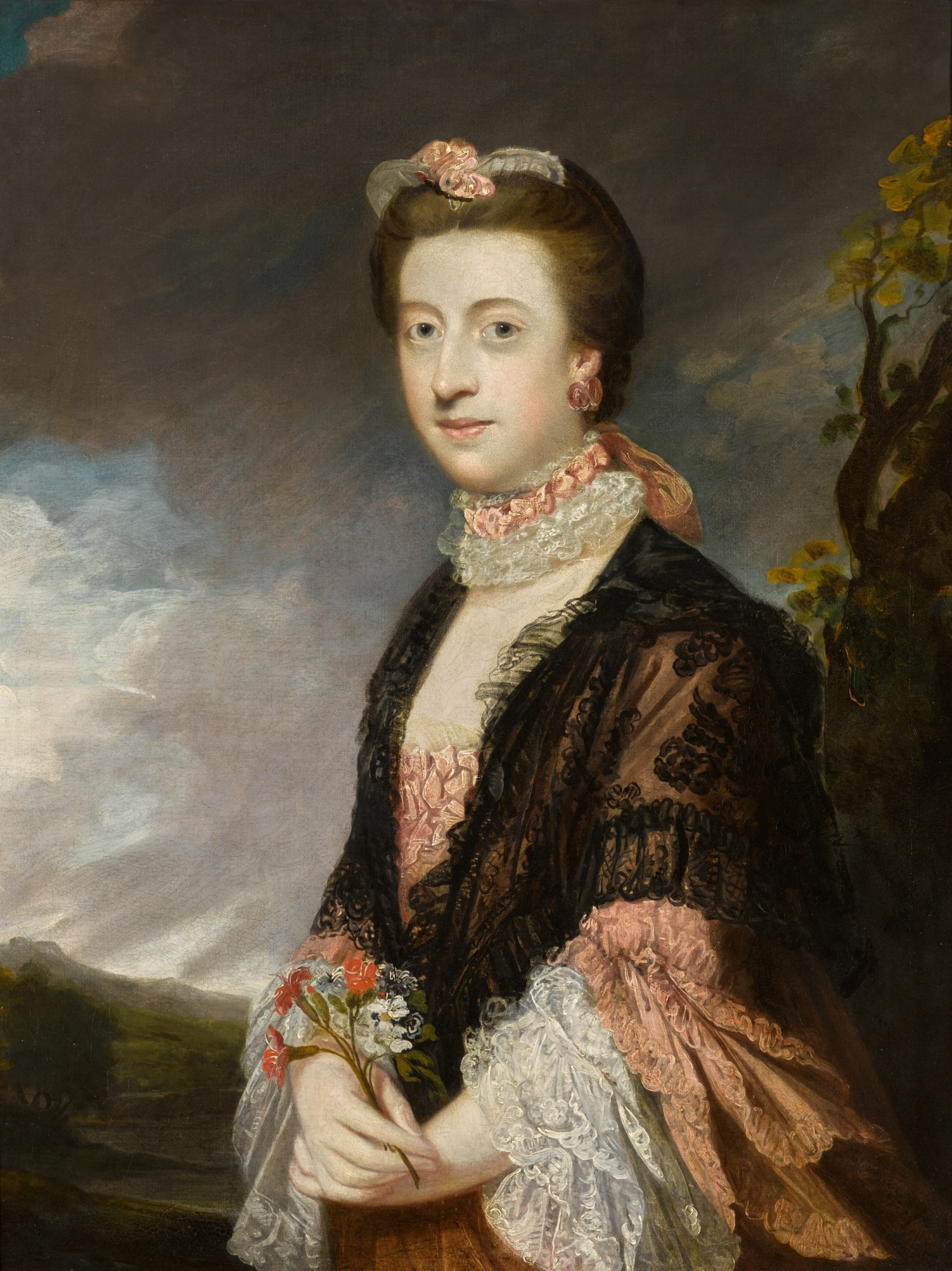
Portrait of Mary, Countess of Courtown, by Joshua Reynolds

Mary Stopford, Countess of Courtown (1736 - 3 January 1810), formerly Mary Powys, was the wife of James Stopford, 2nd Earl of Courtown.

Mary was the daughter of Richard Powys, MP, of Hintlesham Hall, Suffolk, and his wife, the former Lady Mary Brudenell, daughter of George Brudenell, 3rd Earl of Cardigan. Her sister Elizabeth married Thomas Townshend, 1st Viscount Sydney, after whom the Australian City of Sydney was named. Following their father's death in 1743, their mother remarried, her second husband being Thomas Bowlby, MP.

Mary married the future earl on 19 April 1762 at St. George's, Hanover Square, when he was an MP representing an Irish constituency. The earl and countess had four sons:

- James George Stopford, 3rd Earl of Courtown (1765-1835)
- Lt.-Gen. Hon. Sir Edward Stopford (1766–1837), who died unmarried, leaving one illegitimate child
- Admiral Hon. Sir Robert Stopford (1768–1874), who married Mary Fanshawe and had children
- Reverend Hon. Richard Bruce Stopford (1774–1844), who married Hon. Eleanor Powys and had children

They also had one daughter, who is not mentioned as living in the countess's obituary.

The countess's portrait was painted by Sir Joshua Reynolds.

The countess died at her home in Ham Common, Surrey, when "far advanced in life", and was buried at Deene, Northamptonshire.
