= Stopford Building =

University building at the University of Manchester

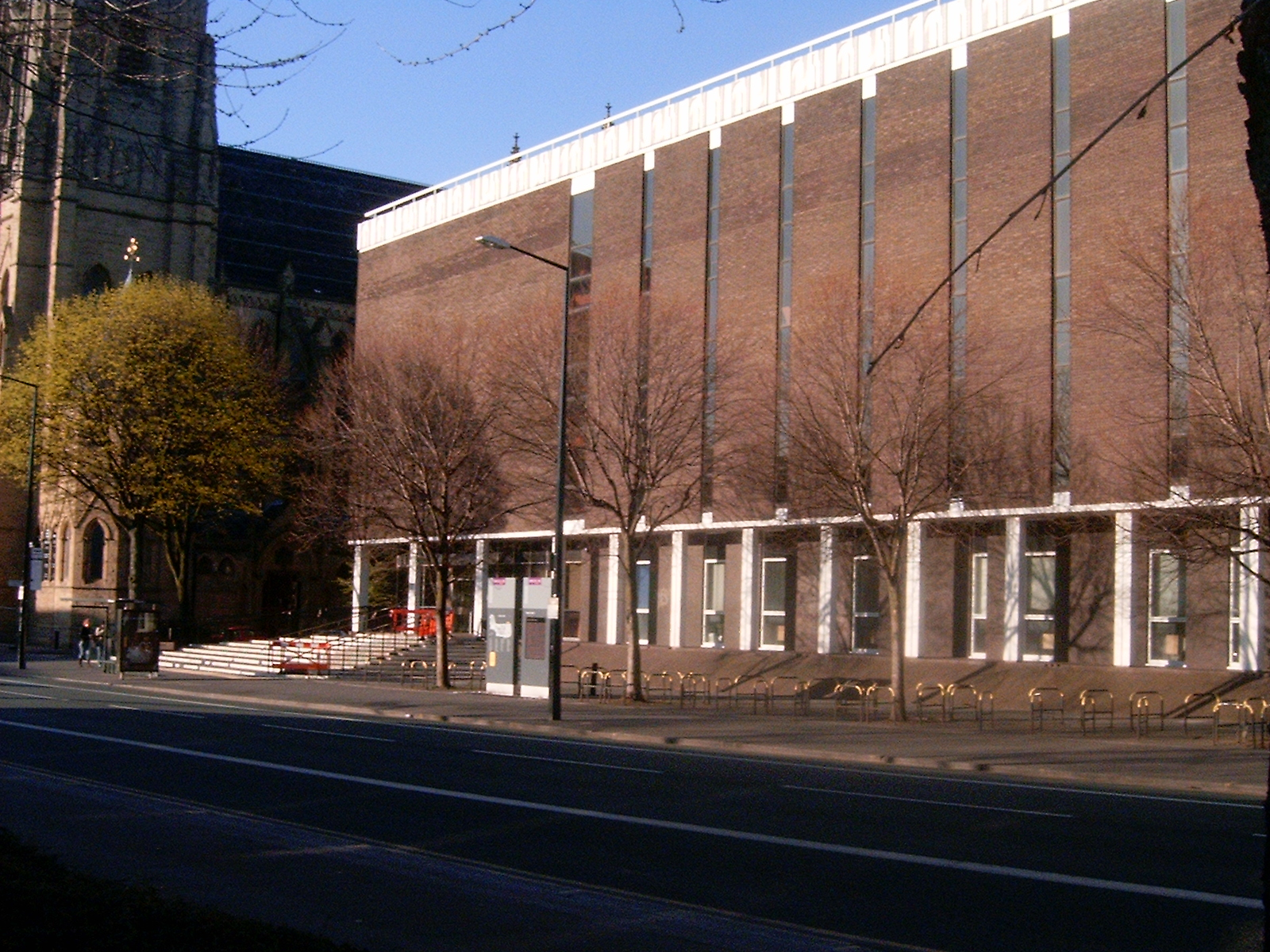
- The Stopford Building from Oxford Road
- Interactive map of the Stopford Building area

General information
- Location: 53.4639°N 2.2308°W
- Construction started: 1969
- Completed: 1972
- Owner: University of Manchester

Design and construction
- Architects: H. S. Fairhurst & Son

The Stopford Building is the second largest building at The University of Manchester, after the Sackville Street Building. It houses the Faculty of Biology, Medicine and Health (FBMH). It was built in 1969-72 (architects H. S. Fairhurst & Son). It is now linked on the east side to the Biotech Building of 1999. The cost of the building was £12.5 million and it was described as the largest and most up-to-date in Europe a few years after its completion. The medical school was then providing more doctors than any other British medical school, as well as dentists, graduate nurses, pharmacists, biochemists and psychiatric social workers.

The new Medical School (1972) was given the name of the Stopford Building in memory of Lord Stopford, a former Vice-Chancellor and notable anatomist. It has six lecture theatres. Also within the building is the Stopford Library (a branch of the university library) which caters for the medical scientists and students. (The library was formerly known as the Medical Faculty Library and was an original feature of the building.)

The Stopford Building is located on Oxford Road, Manchester, on the corner of Ackers Street immediately to the south of the Church of the Holy Name and opposite to the Manchester Academy which is next to the University of Manchester Students' Union (UMSU).
