= Montagu Stopford (Royal Navy officer) =

Royal Navy Admiral (1798–1864)

Admiral The Honourable Sir Montagu Stopford KCB
- Born: 11 November 1798
- Died: 10 November 1864 (aged 65)
- Children: 7, including Lionel
- Military career
- Allegiance: United Kingdom
- Branch: Royal Navy
- Service years: 1810–1864
- Rank: Admiral (Royal Navy)
- Commands: HMS Pique; HMS Trafalgar; HMS Waterloo; HMS London
- Awards: Knight Commander of the Order of the Bath

Admiral Sir Montagu Stopford KCB (11 November 1798 – 10 November 1864) was an officer in the Royal Navy.

== Naval career ==
The fifth and youngest son of James Stopford, 3rd Earl of Courtown, and his wife, the former Lady Mary Scott, he entered the Navy on 8 November 1810 and was commissioned as lieutenant on 17 July 1819 and as commander on 29 January 1822. He was promoted to captain only 3 years later, on 8 April 1825, and his commands at that rank included HMS Pique (1842–46, in the West Indies and North America), HMS Trafalgar (1850-?, during her 1850 re-commissioning), HMS Waterloo (during her 1851 commissioning, preparing her to be Vice-Admiral James Whitley Deans Dundas's flagship in the Mediterranean, until HMS Britannia was selected for this role instead), and HMS London (during her commissioning January–March 1852).

He was captain in the Waterloo again from 1 April 1852, this time during her service as Vice-Admiral Josceline Percy's flagship. He left that role on 5 December 1853 on being promoted to rear admiral, becoming the admiral superintendent of Malta Dockyard in 1855, flying his flag in HMS Ceylon.

He became a Knight Commander of the Bath on 5 July 1855, and was promoted to vice-admiral on 25 June 1858, and finally admiral on 30 November 1863. He had retired by 9 February 1864.

== Family ==
On 25 August 1827, he married Cordelia Winifreda, the second daughter of Major-General Sir George Whitmore – they had four children, including Major George Montagu Stopford. His wife died on 4 September 1851. He remarried, to Lucy Cay, daughter of John Cay, on 29 September 1853, and the couple had three more children (one of whom was Colonel Sir Lionel Stopford).

== See also ==
- O'Byrne, William Richard (1849). "Stopford, Montagu" . A Naval Biographical Dictionary . John Murray – via Wikisource.

Military offices
Preceded by Houston Stewart	Admiral Superintendent, Malta Dockyard; 1855–1858	Succeeded by Henry Codrington
