= John Stopford (priest) =

John Norman Stopford was an Anglican Archdeacon in Zimbabwe in the second half of the 20th century.

Stopford was educated at Emmanuel College, Cambridge and ordained in 1933. After a curacy in Crewe, he was at the Wreningham Mission, Zimbabwe from 1936 to 1939; Daramombe from 1939 to 1944; and Bulawayo from 1947 to 1954. He was Archdeacon of Matabeleland, and Chaplain to the Bishop of Matabeleland from 1954 to 1962.
