= Martin Stopford =

British economist

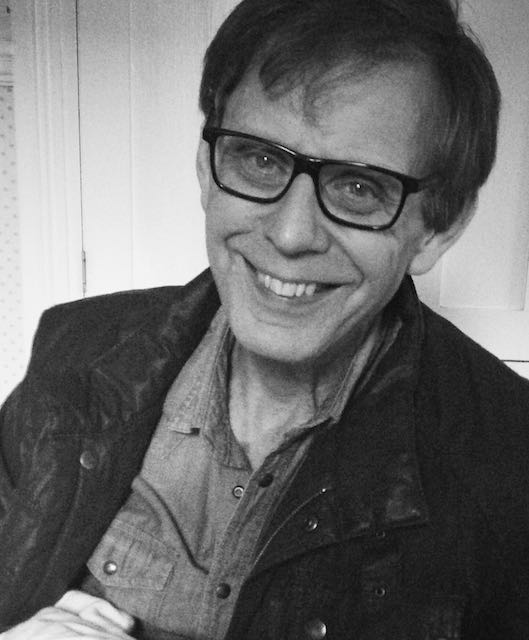
- Born: 1947 (age 77–78); Bolton, England
- Education: Keble College Oxford
- Occupation: Economist

Martin Stopford (born 1947) is a British economist and has had careers as a teacher, writer, information provider and business manager. Stopford is regularly quoted by The Economist, the Financial Times, Bloomberg and Lloyds List. He received a Lloyd's List Lifetime Achievement Award in 2010. He is a director of Clarksons plc, the world's largest shipbroker.

== Early life and education ==
Stopford was born in Bolton, Lancashire in 1947, son of a clergyman. He was educated at Prestfelde School, Shrewsbury and Denstone College, Staffordshire. In 1966, he won an Abbott Scholarship to Keble College, Oxford in 1969 where he studied Politics, Philosophy and Economics (PPE) under Adrian Darby, James Griffin, Paul Hayes, and Basil Mitchell. Stopford went on to receive a Doctor of Philosophy Degree in Economics from Birkbeck College, part of the University of London, which he completed in 1979.

== Career ==
Martin Stopford first became involved with the shipping business in 1971 when he joined Maritime Transport Research, a London-based shipping consultancy. He studied seaborne trade, culminating in the publication, with colleagues Jack Griffiths, Sue Bland and John Stapleton of a six volume series of reports “Dry Cargo Ship Demand to 1980” covering the movement of 220 separate commodity trades by sea.

In 1977, Stopford joined British Shipbuilders as group economist. In 1981, he became director of business development, where his responsibility for the annual corporate plan drew him into the many problems of the 1980s depression in the shipping and shipbuilding industries. In 1988, he was recruited by Chase Manhattan Bank as global shipping economist, just as the ship finance business was re-discovering itself after the disastrous recession. Then in August 1990, on the day that Saddam Hussein invaded Kuwait, he became MD of Clarkson Research. Over a 20-year period, Clarkson Research grew into a sizeable business with over 200 products, serving clients in shipping, shipbuilding, finance, marine equipment and offshore. In 2004, he joined the main Clarksons board.

=== Academia ===
In the late 1970s, Stopford started lecturing at Cambridge Academy of Transport and, in 1989, set up the Anatomy of Ship Finance course which he still leads. He also developed the International Commodity Trade and Transport (ICTC) module at the Centre for Shipping, Trade & Finance at CASS set up by Professor Costas Grammenos in 1984. During the first term, he added shipping economics and taught both courses until the early 1990s.

In 2009, he was given an honorary doctorate by Solent University and, in 2010, he was the winner of the Lifetime Achievement Award at the Lloyds List Global Shipping Awards dinner. He is also a visiting professor at Cass Business School, Dalian Maritime University, Copenhagen Business School and Newcastle University.

=== Writing ===
The first edition of Maritime Economics was published by Allan and Unwin in 1988. It was the first text book to set out a broad economic framework of the international shipping business which transported over 8 billion tonnes of cargo in 2011. Second and third editions were published by Routledge in 1997 and 2009. In 2005, Maritime Economics was awarded the Chojeong Book Prize for "making a significant contribution to the development of maritime transport and logistics academically and practically".

== Personal life ==
Stopford has two children, Benjamin and Elizabeth. He lives in London where he cycles to work in the City each day and still keeps a motorcycle. A lifelong horticulturalist, he is a keen gardener and manages a small organic hill farm in Staffordshire Moorlands.

== Publications ==
- Stopford, Martin (1997). Maritime Economics. Routledge. ISBN 0-415-27558-X.
- A Collection of papers by Martin Stopford. Clarksons plc.

== Website ==
The Maritime Lectures website started as a resource for the book Maritime Economics, but now includes information about institutions around the world which run maritime courses, and a Study Centre where students can watch video lectures, read papers, take tests and monitor their progress, either self-supervised or supervised by an authorised tutor.
