= Frederick Stopford =

British army officer

Lieutenant-General Sir Frederick Stopford KCB KCMG KCVO
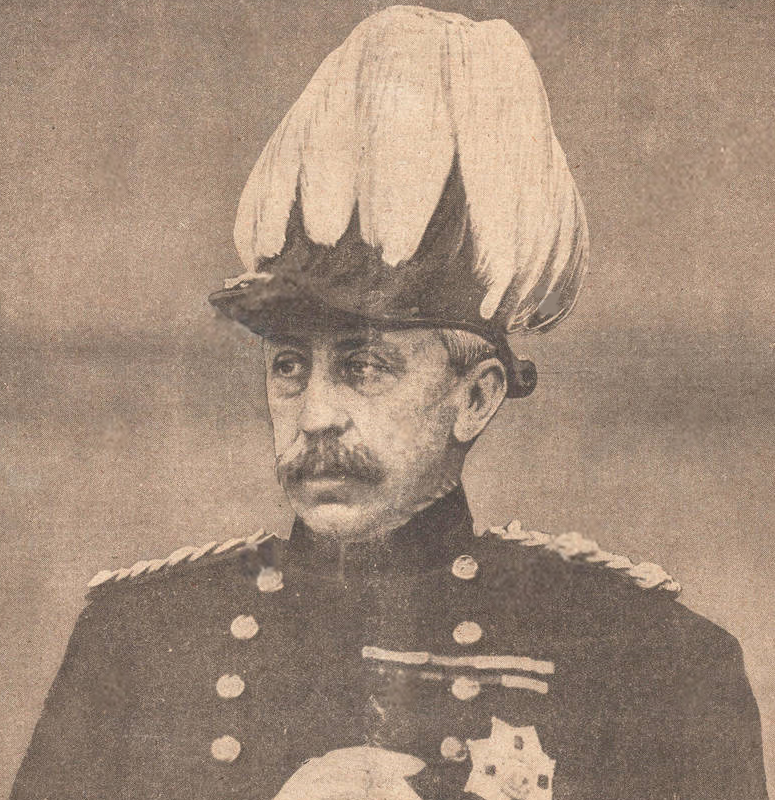
- Sir Frederick Stopford in January 1916
- Born: 2 February 1854; Dublin, Ireland
- Died: 4 May 1929 (aged 75); London, Middlesex, England
- Relatives: James Stopford, 4th Earl of Courtown (father)
- Military career
- Allegiance: United Kingdom
- Branch: British Army
- Service years: 1871–1920
- Rank: Lieutenant-General
- Unit: Grenadier Guards
- Commands: IX Corps; London District
- Conflicts: Anglo-Egyptian War; Mahdist War; Fourth Anglo-Ashanti War; Second Boer War; First World War; Gallipoli campaign; Landing at Suvla Bay
- Awards: Knight Commander of the Order of the Bath; Knight Commander of the Order of St Michael and St George; Knight Commander of the Royal Victorian Order; Mentioned in Despatches

Lieutenant-General Sir Frederick William Stopford, KCB, KCMG, KCVO (2 February 1854 – 4 May 1929) was a British Army officer, best remembered for commanding the landing at Suvla Bay in August 1915, during the Gallipoli Campaign, where he failed to order an aggressive exploitation of the initially successful landings.

== Early life ==
Stopford was a younger son of James Stopford, 4th Earl of Courtown, and his second wife Dora Pennefather, daughter of Edward Pennefather, Lord Chief Justice of Ireland.

== Military career ==
Stopford was commissioned into the Grenadier Guards on 28 October 1871. He was appointed aide-de-camp to Sir John Adye, chief of staff for the Egyptian Expeditionary Force, and took part in the Battle of Tel el-Kebir in 1882. He went on to be aide-de-camp to Major General Arthur Fremantle, commander of the Suakin expedition in 1885. He was then made brigade major for the Brigade of Guards, which had been posted to Egypt.

Stopford returned to England to be brigade major of the 2nd Infantry Brigade at Aldershot in 1886. He became deputy assistant adjutant general at Horseguards in 1892, and deputy assistant adjutant general at Aldershot in 1894. He took part in the Fourth Anglo-Ashanti War in 1895, and became assistant adjutant general at Horseguards in 1897.

Stopford took part in the Second Boer War as military secretary to General Sir Redvers Buller and later military secretary to the general officer commanding Natal, for which he was knighted as a Knight Commander of the Order of St Michael and St George in November 1900. After his return to Britain, he was appointed deputy adjutant general at Aldershot in 1901, and chief staff officer for I Corps with the temporary rank of brigadier general, on 1 April 1902. Two years later, he was appointed director of military training at Horseguards in 1904. Promoted to major general in February 1904, he was major-general commanding the Brigade of Guards and general officer commanding (GOC) of the London District from 1906. He was appointed a Knight Commander of the Royal Victorian Order in June 1909, and promoted to lieutenant general in September.

In October 1912 he was made lieutenant of the Tower of London, taking over the post from General Sir Henry Grant.

On 5 August 1914, a day after the British entry into the First World War, he was appointed GOC First Army, part of Home Forces, a position he held until he took command of IX Corps the following year.

As GOC of IX Corps, Stopford was blamed for the failure to attack following the landing at Suvla Bay in August 1915, during the Gallipoli campaign. Stopford had chosen to command the landing from HMS Jonquil, anchored offshore, but slept as the landing was in progress. He was quickly replaced on 15 August by Major-General Sir Julian Byng.

After almost 50 years of military service, Stopford retired from the army in 1920.

Court offices
Preceded by Henry Loftus	Page of Honour; 1866–1870	Succeeded by Arthur Hardinge
Military offices
Preceded by Sir Laurence Oliphant (As GOC Home District)	GOC London District; 1906–1909	Succeeded by Sir Alfred Codrington
New command	GOC IX Corps; August 1915	Succeeded by Julian Byng
