= John M. Stopford =

John Morton Stopford (September 16, 1939 – August 13, 2011) was a British organizational theorist, consultant, and Professor of the London Business School, and Head of its Strategic and International Management Area. He was known for his work on management of multinationals, corporate entrepreneurs, and competition.

== Life and work ==
Stopford obtained his engineering degrees on the job at Oxford and at MIT, and as a Ford Foundation Fellow obtained his PhD at Harvard Business School.

Stopford had started his career in the late 1950s in the Rotterdam docks. Back in the UK he became craft apprentice at Baker Perkins, a British engineering company based in Peterborough. In the late 1950s he moved to the US, where he participated in the Saturn 1 programme. Back in Europe in the 1960s he joined Royal Dutch Shell in the Netherlands and later in the UK. For some time he was managing director in Guyana for Booker McConnell, before he started his academic career at the Manchester Business School.

In 1971 Stopford moved to the London Business School, where he was Professor of International Business from 1974 to 2002, and founded and chaired the Strategic and International Management Area. He has been Visiting Professor at the Kiel Institute of World Economics in Germany and the Nihon University in Tokyo, Japan. In the year 1995-96 he was elected vice-president of the Academy of International Business.

== Selected publications ==
- Stopford, John M., and Louis T. Wells. Managing the multinational enterprise: Organization of the firm and ownership of the subsidiaries. Vol. 2. New York: Basic Books, 1972.
- Stopford, John M. The world directory of multinational enterprises, 1982-83. Vol. 1. London: Macmillan, 1982.
- Stopford, John M. and Susan Strange with John S. Henley. Rival states, rival firms: Competition for world market shares. Cambridge University Press, 1991.
- Baden-Fuller, Charles, and John M. Stopford. Rejuvenating the mature business: The competitive challenge. Boston: Harvard Business School Press, 1994.

Articles, a selection

- Fouraker, Lawrence E., and John M. Stopford. "Organizational structure and the multinational strategy." Administrative Science Quarterly (1968): 47–64.
- Stopford, John M., and Charles WF Baden‐Fuller. "Creating corporate entrepreneurship." Strategic management journal 15.7 (1994): 521–536.
