= Edward Stopford (British Army officer, born 1766) =

British Army general

Lieutenant-General The Honourable Sir Edward Stopford GCB
- Born: 28 September 1766
- Died: 14 September 1837 (aged 70); Leamington Spa, Warwickshire
- Burial place: Leamington Spa
- Education: Eton College
- Children: Edward Stopford Claremont
- Military career
- Allegiance: United Kingdom
- Branch: British Army
- Service years: 1784–1837
- Rank: Lieutenant-General
- Unit: 3rd Foot Guards
- Commands: 3rd Foot Guards; Guards Brigade; 1st Division; Fusilier Brigade, 4th Division; Brigade, 1st Division; Guards Brigade
- Conflicts: French Revolutionary Wars; Flanders Campaign; Napoleonic Wars; Hanover Expedition; Copenhagen Expedition; Peninsular War; Second Battle of Porto; Battle of Talavera; Battle of Busaco; Battle of Fuentes de Oñoro; Battle of Vitoria; Siege of San Sebastián; Battle of the Bidassoa; Battle of Nivelle; Battle of the Nive; Battle of Bayonne (WIA)
- Awards: Army Gold Medal; Military Order of the Tower and Sword (Portugal)

Sir Edward Stopford GCB (28 September 1766 – 14 September 1837) was an Anglo-Irish British Army officer and politician.

== Early life ==
Edward Stopford was born on 28 September 1766. He was the second son of James Stopford, 2nd Earl of Courtown, and his wife Mary (née Powys). His elder brother was James Stopford, 3rd Earl of Courtown, and his younger brother was Sir Robert Stopford.

== Career ==
He served in the British Army and achieved the rank of Lieutenant-General. In 1810, he succeeded his elder brother as member of parliament for Marlborough, a seat he held until 1818. He was honoured with the title Knight Grand Cross of the Order of the Bath, and served as Colonel of the 41st Regiment of Foot from 1819 until his death.

== Personal life ==
He never married, but he had an affair with a French actress, Mademoiselle Anaïs, with whom he had a son, Edward Stopford Claremont, who also became a British Army general.

== Death ==
He died on 14 September 1837, aged 70.

Parliament of the United Kingdom
Preceded by Lord Bruce; Viscount Stopford	Member of Parliament for Marlborough; 1810–1818; With: Lord Bruce 1810–1814; William Noel-Hill 1814–1818	Succeeded by John Wodehouse; Lord Brudenell
Military offices
Preceded by Josiah Champagné	Colonel of the 41st Regiment of Foot; 1819–1837	Succeeded by Sir Ralph Darling
