= James Stopford, 3rd Earl of Courtown =

British politician

The Right Honourable The Earl of Courtown KP PC

Treasurer of the Household
- In office 1793–1806
- Preceded by: James Stopford, 2nd Earl of Courtown
- Succeeded by: The Lord Ossulton
- In office 1807–1812
- Preceded by: The Lord Ossulton
- Succeeded by: Viscount Jocelyn

Personal details
- Born: 15 August 1765
- Died: 15 June 1835 (aged 69)
- Party: Tory
- Spouse: Mary Scott (m. 1791)
- Parents: James Stopford, 2nd Earl of Courtown (father); Mary Powys (mother)
- Education: Eton College
- Military career
- Branch: British Army
- Rank: Captain
- Unit: Coldstream Guards

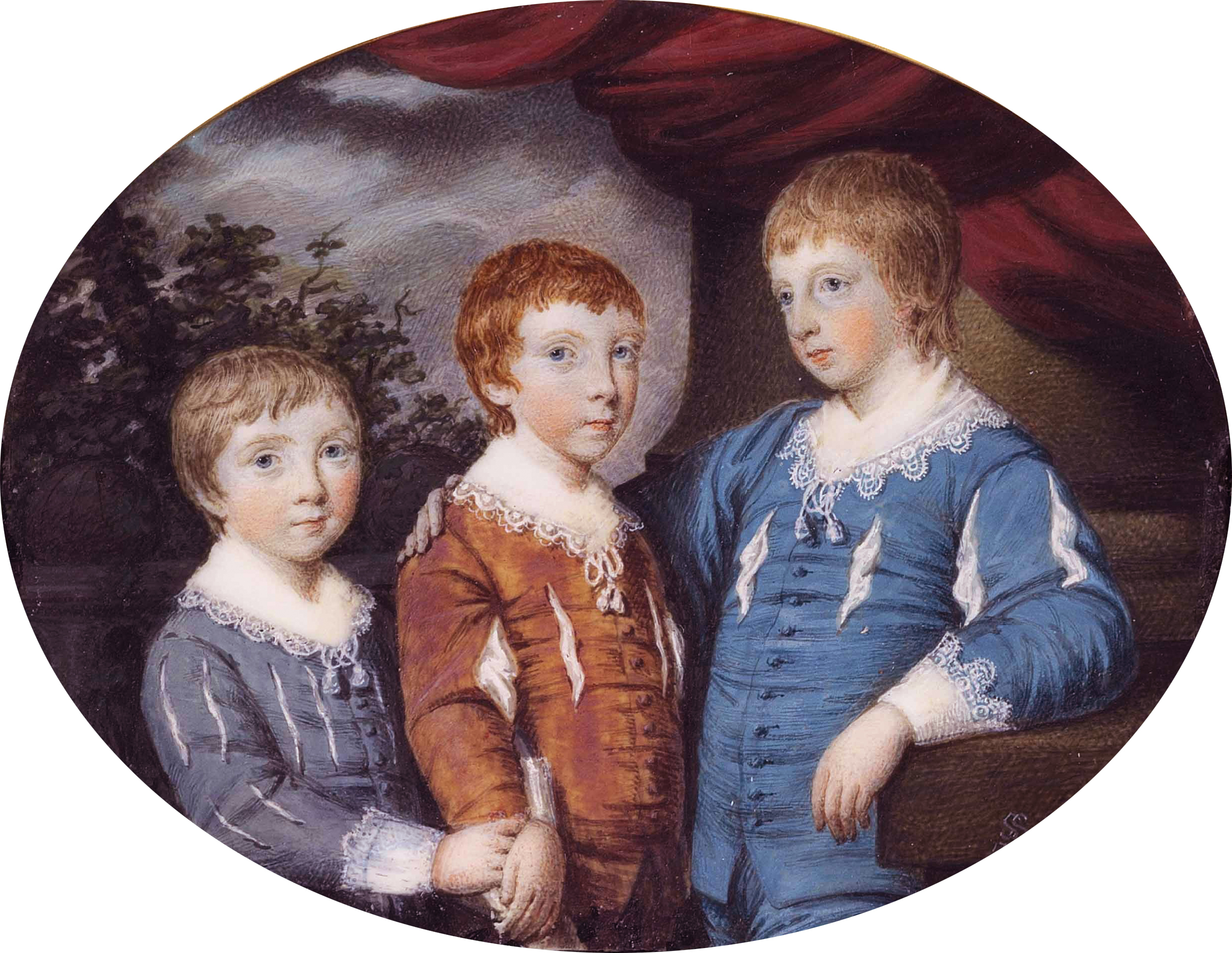
James George, 3rd Earl of Courtown (1765-1835) and his brothers Lt. General The Hon. Sir Edward (1766-1837) and Admiral The Hon. Sir Robert Stopford (1768-1847)

James George Stopford, 3rd Earl of Courtown KP, PC (15 August 1765 – 15 June 1835), known as Viscount Stopford from 1770 to 1810, was an Anglo-Irish peer and Tory politician.

== Early life ==
Courtown was the eldest son of James Stopford, 2nd Earl of Courtown, and his wife Mary (née Powys). Educated at Eton College, he served with the Coldstream Guards and achieved the rank of captain.

== Career ==
In 1790, he was elected to the House of Commons for Great Bedwyn, a seat he held until 1796 and again from 1806 to 1807. He also represented Lanark from 1796 to 1802, Dumfries from 1803 to 1806 and Marlborough from 1807 to 1810. In 1793, he succeeded his father as Treasurer of the Household in the government of William Pitt the Younger, a post he held until 1806 (from 1801 to 1804 under the Premiership of Henry Addington), and again from 1807 to 1812 under the Duke of Portland and Spencer Perceval.

Courtown succeeded his father in the earldom 1810 and held office in the House of Lords as Captain of the Honourable Band of Gentlemen Pensioners under the Earl of Liverpool between 1812 and 1827 and as Captain of the Yeomen of the Guard under Sir Robert Peel in 1835. He was admitted to the Privy Council in 1793 and made a Knight of the Order of St Patrick in 1821.

== Personal life ==
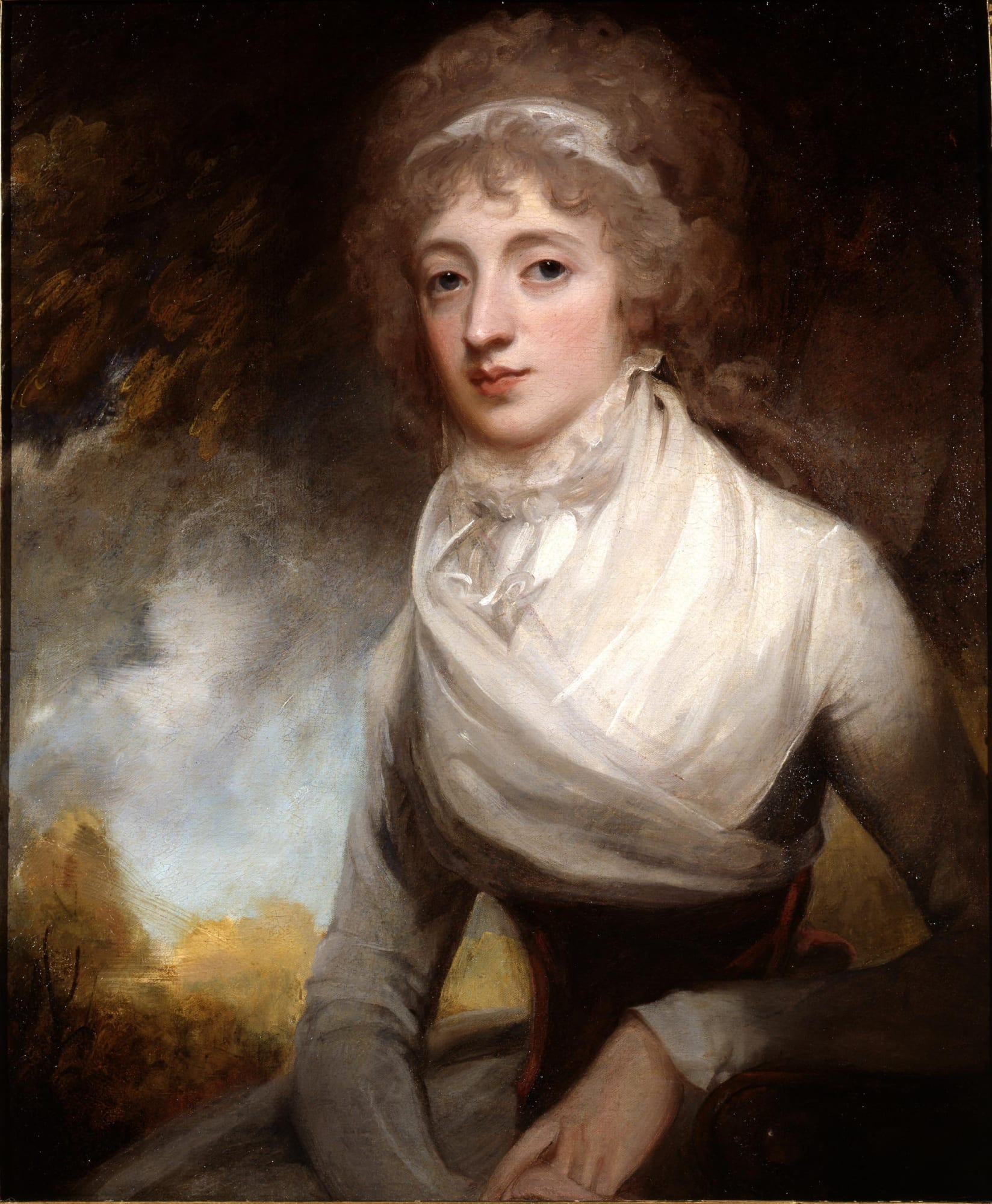
Portrait of Lady Courtown, by George Romney, 1793

Lord Courtown married Lady Mary, daughter of Henry Scott, 3rd Duke of Buccleuch and Lady Elizabeth Montagu, in 1791. They had five sons and one daughter. The two eldest sons died as infants. Their fifth and youngest son the Hon. Sir Montagu Stopford (1798–1864) was a Vice-Admiral in the Royal Navy and the grandfather of General Sir Montagu George North Stopford. Lady Courtown died in April 1823, aged 53. Lord Courtown survived her by twelve years and died in June 1835, aged 69. He was succeeded in the earldom by his third but eldest surviving son James.

Parliament of Great Britain
Preceded by Marquess of Graham; John Stuart	Member of Parliament for Great Bedwyn; 1790–1796; With: John Stuart 1790–1792; Edward Hyde East 1792–1796	Succeeded by Thomas Bruce; John Wodehouse
Preceded by William Grieve	Member of Parliament for Lanark (also known as Linlithgow Burghs); 1796–1801	Succeeded by Parliament of the United Kingdom
Parliament of the United Kingdom
Preceded by Parliament of Great Britain	Member of Parliament for Lanark (also known as Linlithgow Burghs); 1801–1802	Succeeded by William Dickson
Preceded by Charles Hope	Member of Parliament for Dumfries Burghs; 1803–1806	Succeeded by Henry Erskine
Preceded by Sir Robert John Buxton; Sir Nathaniel Holland	Member of Parliament for Great Bedwyn; 1806–1807; With: James Henry Leigh	Succeeded by James Henry Leigh; Sir Vicary Gibbs
Preceded by Lord Bruce; Earl of Dalkeith	Member of Parliament for Marlborough; 1807–1810; With: Lord Bruce	Succeeded by Lord Bruce; Edward Stopford
Political offices
Preceded by The Earl of Courtown	Treasurer of the Household; 1793–1806	Succeeded by Lord Ossulston
Preceded by Lord Ossulston	Treasurer of the Household; 1807–1812	Succeeded by Viscount Jocelyn
Preceded by The Earl of Mount Edgcumbe	Captain of the Honourable Band of Gentlemen Pensioners; 1812–1827	Succeeded by The Viscount Hereford
Preceded by The Earl of Gosford	Captain of the Yeomen of the Guard; 1835	Succeeded by The Earl of Gosford
Peerage of Ireland
Preceded by James Stopford	Earl of Courtown; 1810–1835	Succeeded by James Thomas Stopford
