= Archdeacon of Leighlin =

Province of Dublin
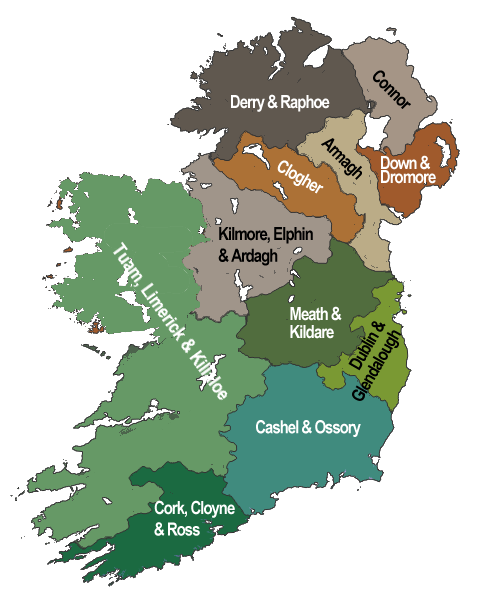
- Church: Church of Ireland
- Metropolitan bishop: Archbishop of Dublin
- Cathedral: Christ Church Cathedral, Dublin
- Dioceses: 5

The Archdeacon of Leighlin was a senior ecclesiastical officer within the Diocese of Ferns and Leighlin until 1835 and then within the Diocese of Ossory, Ferns and Leighlin until 1977 when it was further enlarged to become the Diocese of Cashel and Ossory. As such he was responsible for the disciplinary supervision of the clergy within the Cloyne Diocese.

The archdeaconry can trace its history from William, the first known incumbent, who held the office in 1200 to the last discrete holder John Richard Hedges Becher who was appointed in 1922.

It was replaced by the combined archdeaconry of Ossory and Leighlin in 1924.
