= Robert Carew =

Robert Carew may refer to:

- Robert Carew (footballer) (1899–1969), Australian rules footballer
- Robert Carew, 1st Baron Carew (1787–1856), Irish politician
- Robert Carew, 2nd Baron Carew (1818–1881), Irish politician
- Robert Carew, 3rd Baron Carew (1860–1923), Irish peer
- Robert Shapland Carew (1752–1829), Irish politician
