= Thomas Whaley (politician) =

Irish gambler and politician

Thomas 'Buck' Whaley
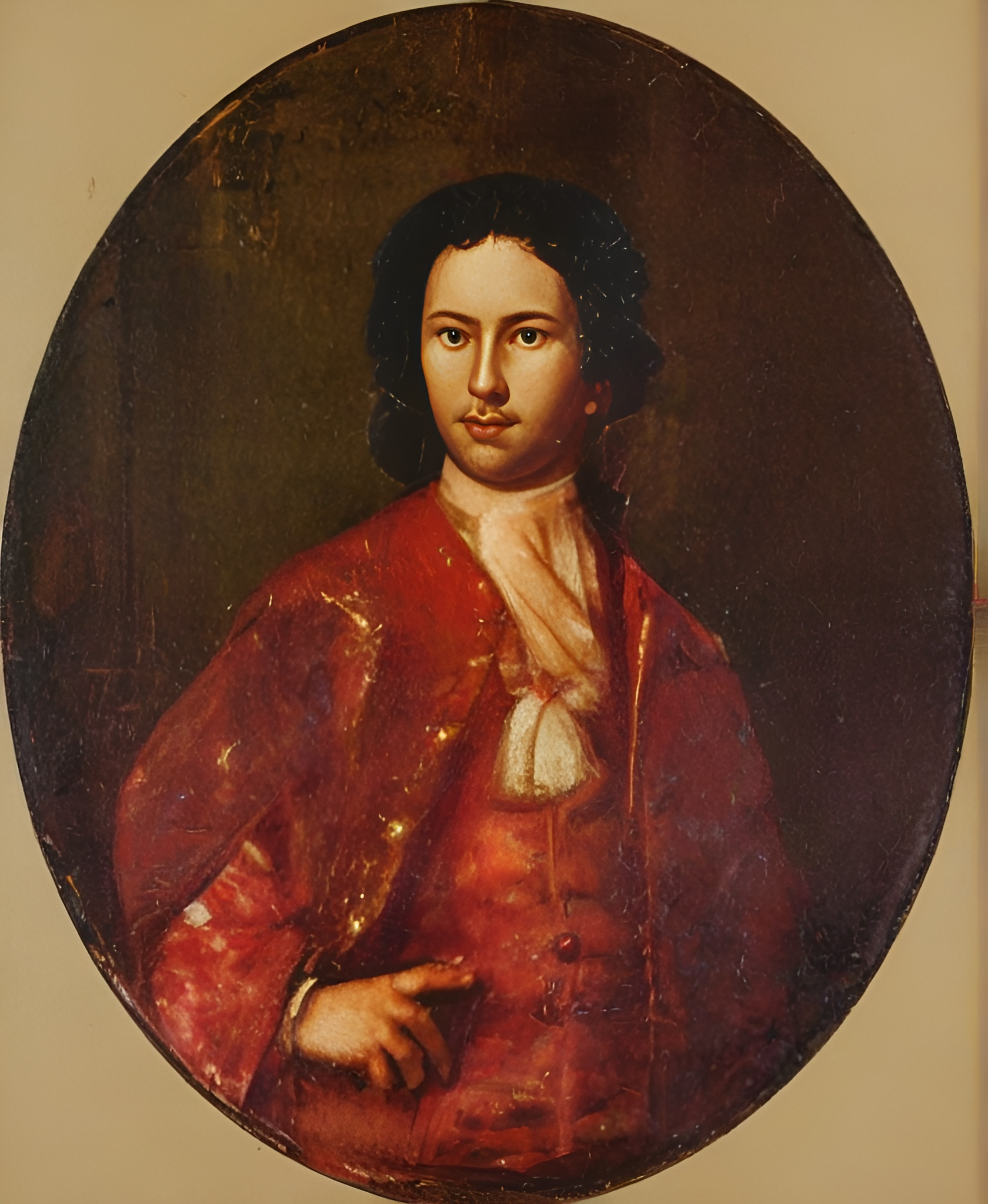
- Portrait of Thomas Whaley
- Born: Thomas Whaley; 15 December 1765; Dublin, Ireland
- Died: 2 November 1800 (aged 34); Knutsford, UK
- Occupations: Politician; Adventurer
- Spouse: Mary Catherine Lawless (m. 1800)
- Children: 3

Thomas Whaley (15 December 1765 – 2 November 1800), commonly known as Buck Whaley or Jerusalem Whaley, was an Irish gambler and member of the Irish House of Commons.

== Early life ==
Whaley was born in Dublin in December 1765, the eldest surviving son of the landowner, magistrate and former Member of Parliament Richard Chapell Whaley, referred to as Burn-Chapel Whaley due to his strong anti-Catholic sentiments and actions. Richard Whaley died in 1769, leaving an estate that included a town-house on St Stephen's Green, land in County Wicklow and £60,000. The estate generated an income of £7,000 per annum which became available to the young Whaley when he reached the age of eighteen.

At the age of sixteen, Whaley was sent to Europe on the Grand Tour, accompanied by a tutor and with an allowance of £900, a sum that proved to be inadequate. He settled in Auch for some time and later moved on to Lyon, but was forced to leave Lyon when his cheque for the amount of £14,800, to settle debts accrued in one night of gambling, was refused by his bankers, the La Touche bank.

Following his return to Dublin, Whaley, at the age of nineteen, was elected to the Irish House of Commons in 1785 representing the constituency of Newcastle in County Dublin.

== The Jerusalem wager ==
Buck Whaley lacking much in cash
And being used to cut a dash
He wagered full ten thousand pound
He'd visit soon the Holy Ground

— Verse from a Dublin ballad of the 1780s,

While dining with William FitzGerald, the Duke of Leinster at Leinster House, in response to a question regarding his future travel plans, Whaley flippantly mentioned Jerusalem. This reply led to wagers totalling £15,000 (i.e. about £1.8 million in 2001) being offered that Whaley could not travel to Jerusalem and back within two years and provide proof of his success. The reasoning of those offering the bets was based on the belief that, as the region was part of the Ottoman Empire and had a reputation for widespread banditry, it would be too dangerous for travellers and it would be unlikely that Whaley could complete the journey.

Whaley embarked from Dublin on 8 October 1788, with a retinue of servants and a "large stock of Madeira wine" to cheers from the large crowd assembled at the Dublin quays. Whaley sailed first to Deal, where he was joined by a companion, a Captain Wilson, for the journey, and then on to Gibraltar where a ball was held for his arrival. In Gibraltar, his party was joined by another military officer, Captain Hugh Moore. The party set sail for the port of Smyrna, although Wilson was prevented from travelling any further by rheumatic fever. The remaining pair made an overland journey from there to Constantinople, arriving in December.

The British ambassador in Constantinople introduced Whaley to the Vizier Hasan Pasha. Taking a liking to Whaley, Hasan Pasha provided him with permits to visit Jerusalem. Whaley's party left Constantinople on 21 January 1789 by ship, and sailed to Acre.

In a meeting reported in Whaley's memoirs later, he encountered the Wāli (governor) (and de facto ruler) of Acre and Galillee, Ahmed al-Jazzar. It was Whaley's twenty-second birthday. Al-Jazzar, notoriously known as "The Butcher" in the region he ruled, took a liking to Mr Whaley; and though he dismissed the documents issued in Constantinople as worthless, he permitted Whaley to continue his journey. During this audience, Whaley said in his memoirs that he interceded with al-Jazzar to stop him from breaking the back of a servant with a hammer. He also tells how al-Jazzar then paraded his concubines for the visitors.

Whaley and his companions made their way overland to Jerusalem, arriving on 28 February. During his visit, he stayed at a Franciscan monastery, the Convent of Terra Sancta. It was a signed certificate from the superior of this institution, along with detailed observations of the buildings of Jerusalem, that would provide the proof needed to prove the success of his journey. They stayed for a few days, before returning to Acre and sailing back to Europe.

Whaley arrived back in Dublin in the summer of 1789 to great celebrations and collected the winnings of the wager. The trip cost him a total of £8,000, leaving him a profit of £7,000.

== Later life ==
Following his Jerusalem exploit, Whaley remained in Dublin for around two years and later spent time in London and travelling in Europe, including Paris during the Revolutionary period.

Due to mounting debts, he was forced to sell much of his estate in the early 1790s and these financial problems also led to his departure from Dublin. Whaley, accompanied by his companion, a Miss Courtney, and their children, left Dublin to take up residence in the Isle of Man, where he had a house built near Douglas. Nicknamed "Whaley's Folly", this house later became the Fort Anne Hotel. The house became another part of another story, as it was reported that the house was built on soil imported from Ireland, so Whaley could win a bet that he could "live upon Irish ground without residing in Ireland". A recovery in the state of his finances enabled Whaley to be re-elected to the Irish House of Commons, this time representing the constituency of Enniscorthy from 1798 until his death in 1800. Whaley is said to have accepted bribes for his vote from both sides to support and later oppose the Act of Union.

Miss Courtney died in the late 1790s. A year before his death, Whaley married Mary Lawless, the sister of his friend Valentine Lawless, 2nd Baron Cloncurry.

Whaley died on 2 November 1800 in the Cheshire town of Knutsford, while travelling from Liverpool to London. The cause of death was attributed to rheumatic fever, although a popular story circulated in Ireland that he was stabbed in a jealous rage by one of two sisters, both of whom were objects of his attention. He is buried in Knutsford graveyard, Cheshire. On a plain grave-stone in the centre of the south-western portion of the church-yard, it is recorded, "Underneath is interred the Body of THOMAS WHALEY, Esquire of the City of Dublin, who died November 2nd., 1800. Aged 34 years."

Whaley wrote his memoirs in 1797, but these were suppressed by the executors of his estate and remained unpublished until 1906.

A full-length biography of Whaley, Buck Whaley: Ireland's Greatest Adventurer by David Ryan, was published by Merrion Press in February 2019. This book draws on Whaley's memoirs, an unpublished journal that Hugh Moore kept while on the Jerusalem expedition, and many other manuscripts sources including the extensive correspondence of Whaley's land agent Samuel Faulkner.

== Portrayal in popular culture ==
=== Literature ===
- Tom Knox (Pseudonym) in the 2009 novel The Genesis Secret.

=== Television ===
- Bóthar Buck (2016), a four-part TG4 documentary in which Rossa Ó Snodaigh of Kíla re-enacted the journey of Buck Whaley to Jerusalem and back.

Parliament of Ireland
Preceded by David La Touche; John La Touche	Member of Parliament for Newcastle; 1785–1790; With: John La Touche	Succeeded by David La Touche; David La Touche
Preceded by Robert Cornwall; William Congreve Alcock	Member of Parliament for Enniscorthy; 1798 – 1801; With: Robert Cornwall 1798–1800; Peter Burrowes Feb–Jun 1800; Thomas Dawson 1800–1801	Succeeded by Parliament of the United Kingdom
