= Cornelius Bolton =

Cornelius Bolton may refer to:

- Cornelius Bolton (died 1779), MP for Waterford
- Cornelius Bolton (died 1829), MP for Waterford and Lanesborough
