= Frederick Solly-Flood =

Frederick Solly-Flood may refer to:

- Frederick Solly-Flood (British Army officer)
- Frederick Solly-Flood (attorney general), his father
