= Richard Levinge (1724–1783) =

Irish politician and landowner

Richard Levinge (1724 – April 1783) was an Irish politician and landowner from County Kildare.

He was the son of Sir Richard Levinge, 1st Baronet, Chief Justice of the Irish Common Pleas, and his second wife Mary Johnson, daughter of Robert Johnson, Baron of the Court of Exchequer (Ireland) and his wife Margaret Dixon. He was the only son of his father's late second marriage and his father died when he was only a few months old. Sir Richard had six children by a previous marriage to Mary Corbin. From an old Derbyshire family, he came to Ireland in 1689, and for 35 years was one of the leading figures in Irish public life.

The younger Richard married Alice Marlay, daughter of Thomas Marlay, Lord Chief Justice of Ireland, and Anne De Laune. They had one daughter Mary, who married James Cuffe, 1st Baron Tyrawley.

He lived mainly at Calverstown, County Kildare, the family home of his grandmother.

He sat in the House of Commons of Ireland from 1766 to 1776 as a member for Duleek.

Parliament of Ireland
Preceded by Henry Monck; Andrew Ram	Member of Parliament for Duleek; 1768 – 1776; With: Stephen Ram 1768; Andrew Ram from 1769	Succeeded by Andrew Ram; Edward Stopford
