= Andrew Ram =

Andrew Ram may refer to:

- Andrew Ram (died 1698), Irish MP for Duleek
- Andrew Ram (1711–1793), Irish MP for Duleek and County Wexford
