= Woodstown House =

Country house in County Waterford, Ireland

Coordinates: 52.199°N 6.987°W

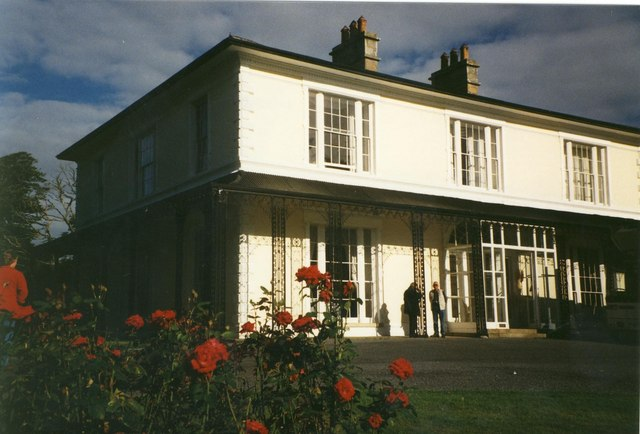
Woodstown House

Woodstown House is a country house in the townland of Woodtown Lower in eastern County Waterford, Ireland.

The current house was built in the Regency-style in 1823 but may incorporate the fabric of an earlier house dating to the 1720s. The house was built by Robert Shapland Carew to designs attributable to George Richard Pain (1793 - 1838). It is a detached three-bay two-storey house, with three-bay two-storey side elevations, and seven-bay two-storey service return wing to north-west on a U-shaped plan.

Robert was elevated to the peerage as Baron Carew in 1834 and Woodstown House became his seat.

At the time of the Irish Tourist Association survey in 1945, the house was owned by the Hearne family but was unoccupied. It was subsequently let to visitors who included, in 1967, Mrs. Jacqueline Kennedy, widow of U.S. President John F. Kennedy, and her children.
