= Abel Ram (died 1830) =

Anglo-Irish politician (1753–1830)

Member of Parliament for Duleek
- In office 1790–1970 Serving with Andrew Ram
- Preceded by: Edward Stopford and Andrew Ram
- Succeeded by: William Knott and Charles Montague Ormsby

Member of Parliament for County Wexford
- In office 1797–1800 Serving with Viscount Loftus
- Preceded by: George Ogle and Viscount Loftus
- Succeeded by: Parliament of the United Kingdom

Member of Parliament for County Wexford
- In office 1801–1806 Serving with Viscount Loftus to May 1806; Caesar Colclough from May 1806
- Preceded by: Members of the Parliament of Ireland
- Succeeded by: John Colcough and Robert Shapland Carew I
- In office 1807–1812 Serving with William Congreve Alcock
- Preceded by: John Colcough and Robert Shapland Carew I
- Succeeded by: Robert Shapland Carew II and Sir Frederick Flood, Bt

Personal details
- Born: 1753
- Died: 1830 (aged 76–77)
- Spouse: Elizabeth Stopford
- Parent(s): Andrew Ram (father); Mary Digby (mother)

Abel Ram (1753–1830) was an Anglo-Irish landowner and politician. He was the son of Andrew Ram and Mary Digby, daughter of John Digby of County Kildare.

He married Elizabeth Stopford, daughter of Captain Joseph Stopford, and niece of James Stopford, 1st Earl of Courtown.

== Career ==
He was a member of parliament (MP) for Duleek in the Irish Parliament from 1783 to 1790 and County Wexford from 1797 to 1800. His uncle, also Abel Ram, was the patron of Duleek. Ram was an MP for County Wexford from 1801 to 1806 and 1807 to 1812 in the United Kingdom Parliament after the 1800 Acts of Union, sitting in the interest of his wife's family.

Parliament of Ireland
Preceded by Edward Stopford; Andrew Ram	Member of Parliament for Duleek; 1790–1790; With: Andrew Ram	Succeeded by William Knott; Charles Montague Ormsby
Preceded by George Ogle; Viscount Loftus	Member of Parliament for County Wexford; 1797–1800; With: Viscount Loftus	Succeeded by Parliament of the United Kingdom
Parliament of the United Kingdom
Preceded by Members of the Parliament of Ireland	Member of Parliament for County Wexford; 1801–1806; With: Viscount Loftus to May 1806; Caesar Colclough from May 1806	Succeeded by John Colclough; Robert Shapland Carew I
Preceded by John Colclough; Robert Shapland Carew I	Member of Parliament for County Wexford; 1807–1812; With: William Congreve Alcock	Succeeded by Robert Shapland Carew II; Sir Frederick Flood, Bt
