= Enniscorthy (Parliament of Ireland constituency) =

Pre-1801 Irish constituency

- Former borough constituency for the Irish House of Commons
- County: County Wexford
- Borough: Enniscorthy

1613–1801
- Replaced by: Disfranchised

Enniscorthy was a constituency represented in the Irish House of Commons until its abolition on 1 January 1801.

== History ==
In the Patriot Parliament of 1689 summoned by James II, Enniscorthy was represented with two members.

== Members of Parliament, 1613–1801 ==
- 1613–1615, Sir Edward Fisher and Richard Perkins
- 1634–1635, Sir Arthur Loftus and Thomas Newcomen
- 1639–1649, William Swanton and Ralph Waddington (unseated and replaced by Sir Thomas Esmond, 1st Baronet, (expelled 1642))
- 1661, Timothy Stampe and James Napper (Napper AWOL and replaced in 1662 by George Carleton)

=== 1689–1801 ===
Election	First MP		Second MP
1689	James Devereux		Dudley Colclough
1689	James Devereux		Arthur Waddington
1692	Richard Barry		John Seymour
September 1703	Morley Saunders		John Asgill (Note: Expelled in 1703)
1703	Morley Saunders		William Berry
1713	Morley Saunders		Richard Le Hunt
1715	William Berry		Richard Le Hunt
1740	Anderson Saunders		Richard Le Hunt
1747	Anderson Saunders		Hon. Thomas George Southwell
1761	Beauchamp Bagenal		John Grogan
1768	Beauchamp Bagenal		Cornelius Grogan
1769	Sir Edward Newenham	Patriot	Cornelius Grogan
1776	Frederick Flood (Note: Created a baronet in 1780)		Mountifort Longfield
October 1783	William Alexander English (Note: Declared not duly elected in 1783)		Mountifort Longfield
1783	Conway Heatley		Mountifort Longfield
1790	Vesey Colclough		Mountifort Longfield
1795	Robert Cornwall		Mountifort Longfield
January 1798	Robert Cornwall		William Congreve Alcock (Note: Also elected for Waterford City in 1798, for which he chose to sit)
1798	Robert Cornwall		Thomas Whaley
February 1800	Peter Burrowes		Thomas Whaley
June 1800	Thomas Dawson		Thomas Whaley
1801	Disenfranchised		

== Bibliography ==
- O'Hart, John (2007). The Irish and Anglo-Irish Landed Gentry: When Cromwell came to Ireland. Vol. II. Heritage Books. ISBN 978-0-7884-1927-0.
- Leigh Rayment's historical List of Members of the Irish House of Commons. Cites: Johnston-Liik, Edith Mary (2002). The History of the Irish Parliament 1692-1800 (6 volumes). Ulster Historical Foundation.
