= Sir John Newport, 1st Baronet =

Anglo-Irish Whig politician

The Right Honourable Sir John Newport Bt
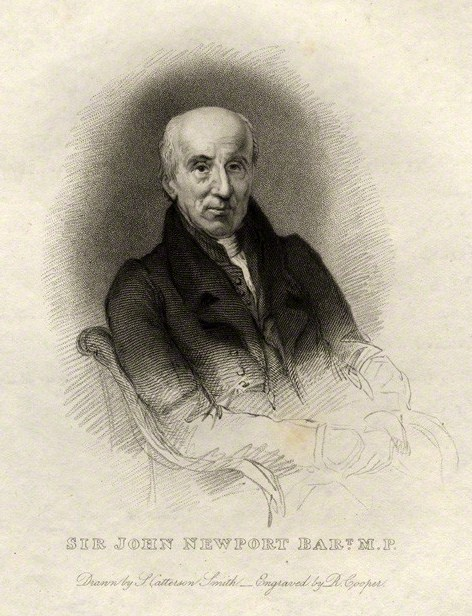

Chancellor of the Exchequer of Ireland
- In office 24 February 1806 – 30 April 1807
- Monarch: George III
- Prime Minister: The Lord Grenville
- Preceded by: John Foster
- Succeeded by: John Foster

Comptroller General of the Exchequer
- In office 11 October 1834 – 18 April 1835
- Monarch: William IV
- Preceded by: New office
- Succeeded by: Thomas Spring Rice

Personal details
- Born: 24 October 1756
- Died: 9 February 1843 (aged 86)
- Party: Whig
- Spouse: Ellen Carew
- Education: Trinity College, Dublin

Sir John Newport, 1st Baronet (24 October 1756 – 9 February 1843) was an Anglo-Irish Whig politician who served as Chancellor of the Exchequer of Ireland.

== Life ==
Born on 24 October 1756, he was the son of Simon Newport, a banker at Waterford, by his wife, Elizabeth, daughter of William Riall of Clonmel. After receiving his education at Eton College and Trinity College Dublin, he became a partner in his father's bank. He took part in the convention of volunteer delegates which met in Dublin under the presidency of James Caulfeild, 1st Earl of Charlemont in November 1783, and was appointed a member of the committee of inquiry into the state of the borough representation in Ireland.

Newport was created a baronet on 25 August 1789, with remainder to his brother, William Newport. At the 1802 general election, he unsuccessfully contested the Waterford City for the Whig interest against William Congreve Alcock. Newport, however, obtained the seat on petition in December 1803, and continued to represent Waterford until his retirement from parliamentary life at the dissolution in December 1832. On the formation of the Ministry of All the Talents, Newport was appointed Chancellor of the Irish exchequer (25 February 1806), and was sworn a member of the English privy council on 12 March 1806. He brought in his first Irish budget on 7 May 1806. In November of this year he was returned for St Mawes, as well as for the city of Waterford, but chose to sit for Waterford. He brought in his second budget on 25 March 1807, and shortly afterwards resigned office with the rest of his colleagues. Newport received a D.C.L. from the University of Oxford on 3 July 1810.

Newport did not accept office in Lord Liverpool's administration, because the government was averse to measures of Catholic emancipation.

He was a leading critic of the Earl of Elgin's removal of the Elgin Marbles from Athens, commenting that "The Honourable Lord has taken advantage of the most unjustifiable means and has committed the most flagrant pillages. It was, it seems, fatal that a representative of our country loots those objects that the Turks and other barbarians had considered sacred".

He spoke for the last time in the House of Commons on 25 June 1832, during the debate in committee on the Parliamentary Reform Bill for Ireland. On 11 October 1834 he was appointed Comptroller General of the Exchequer, a new office. He retired in 1839, with a pension, and died at Newpark, near Waterford, on 9 February 1843. He was buried in Waterford Cathedral on 15 February following. His tenacity with inquiries in the House of Commons earned him the nickname of the "Political Ferret".

== Works ==
Newport was the author of The State of the Borough Representation of Ireland in 1783 and 1800, London, 1832.

== Family ==
Newport married Ellen, third daughter of Shapland Carew of Castle Boro, M.P. for Waterford city, by whom he had no issue. He was succeeded in the baronetcy by his nephew, the Rev. John Newport, on whose death, on 15 February 1859, the baronetcy became extinct.

== Notes ==
Attribution

This article incorporates text from a publication now in the public domain: Lee, Sidney, ed. (1894). "Newport, John". Dictionary of National Biography. Vol. 40. London: Smith, Elder & Co.

Parliament of the United Kingdom
Preceded by William Congreve Alcock	Member of Parliament for Waterford City; 1803 – 1832	Succeeded by Henry Barron; William Christmas
Political offices
Preceded by John Foster	Chancellor of the Exchequer of Ireland; 1806 – 1807	Succeeded by John Foster
Baronetage of Ireland
New creation	Baronet (of Newpark); 1789–1843	Succeeded by John Newport
