= Frederick Flood =

Sir Frederick Flood, 1st Baronet KC

1st Baronet

Member of the Dublin Parliament for Enniscorthy
- In office 1776–1783 Serving with Mountifort Longfield
- Preceded by: Edward Newenham; Cornelius Grogan
- Succeeded by: William Alexander English; Mountifort Longfield

Member of the Dublin Parliament for Ardfert
- In office 1783–1790 Serving with: John Scott (1783); John Tydd (1783–1790)
- Preceded by: Edward Gleadowe; Maurice Copinger
- Succeeded by: Robert Day; Richard Archdall

Member of the Dublin Parliament for Carlow
- In office 1790–1796 Serving with John Ormsby Vandeleur
- Preceded by: Augustus Cavendish-Bradshaw; John Ormsby Vandeleur
- Succeeded by: Henry Prittie; William Elliot

Member of Parliament for County Wexford
- In office 10 October 1812 – 21 July 1818 Serving with Robert Carew
- Preceded by: Abel Ram; William Congreve Alcock
- Succeeded by: Robert Carew; Caesar Colclough

Personal details
- Born: 1741
- Died: 1 February 1824
- Relatives: Warden Flood (uncle)

Sir Frederick Flood, 1st Baronet, KC (1741–1 February 1824), was an Irish lawyer and politician. He was a Member of Parliament (MP) in the Irish House of Commons from 1776 until 1801, and then later an MP in the United Kingdom House of Commons from 1801 until 1818. Flood opposed the Act of Union 1800 that merged the Kingdoms of Ireland and Great Britain. He sat as a member of the united Parliament in London.

== Family and early life ==
Flood was the younger son of John Flood of Farmley, County Kilkenny, and nephew of Warden Flood, chief justice of the court of king's bench in Ireland, the father of the Right Hon. Henry Flood. He was born in 1741, and was educated at Kilkenny College and at Trinity College Dublin, where he proceeded B.A. in 1761, M.A. in 1764, LL.B. in 1766, and LL.D. in 1772. He was called to the Irish Bar in 1763, soon attained considerable legal practice, and in the social circles of Dublin was immensely popular from his wit and oddity.

He married twice; firstly Lady Juliana Annesley, the daughter of Richard Annesley, 6th Earl of Anglesey and secondly Frances, the daughter of Sir Henry Cavendish, 1st Baronet of Doveridge, with whom he had an only surviving daughter Frances, who married Richard Solly of Walthamstow and York Place, London, whose son Frederick became Sir Fredericks's heir.

He succeeded to handsome estates, including Ballynaslaney House, County Wexford from both his parents, and in 1776 was elected to the Irish House of Commons as MP for Enniscorthy.

== Political career ==
He sat for Enniscorthy until 1783. From 1783 to 1790 he was MP for Ardfert, and in 1796–7 for the borough of Carlow. His relationship to Henry Flood did more for his reputation than his own abilities, and he consistently followed in his cousin's footsteps. In 1778 he was made a King's Counsel and was elected a bencher of the King's Inns. He was the Custos Rotulorum of County Wexford. On 3 June 1780 he was created a baronet in the Baronetage of Ireland of Newton Ormonde on the County of Kilkenny and of Banna Lodge in the County of Wexford. Two years later he married Lady Juliana Annesley, daughter of Arthur Annesley, 5th Earl of Anglesey, and he took a prominent part in the volunteer movement, being elected colonel of the Wexford regiment.

In many debates which preceded the abolition of the Irish parliament Flood was a frequent speaker. Sir Jonah Barrington calls him an ostentatious blunderer, whose 'bulls' did not contain the pith of sound sense which underlay the mistakes of Sir Boyle Roche. He adds that Flood would rashly accept any suggestions made to him while speaking, and one day, just after he had declared "that the magistrates of Wexford deserved the thanks of the lord-lieutenant", he added, on some wit's suggestion, "and should be whipped at the cart's tail". He steadily opposed the Act of Union. He later sat in the House of Commons of the United Kingdom for County Wexford from 1812 to 1818. He made no particular impression there.

== Later life ==
His only son died unmarried in 1800, and it was proposed to perpetuate Flood's title by creating him a baronet of the United Kingdom, with remainder to his only daughter Frances, who was married to Richard Solly, esq. He died on 1 February 1824, before the patent for this new honour had passed the great seal, and left his estates to his grandson, Frederick, who took the name of Flood in addition to his own.

Parliament of Ireland
Preceded by Edward Newenham; Cornelius Grogan	Member of Parliament for Enniscorthy; 1776–1783; With: Mountifort Longfield	Succeeded by William Alexander English; Mountifort Longfield
Preceded by Edward Gleadowe; Maurice Copinger	Member of Parliament for Ardfert; 1783–1790; With: John Scott (1783); John Tydd (1783–1790)	Succeeded by Robert Day; Richard Archdall
Preceded by Augustus Cavendish-Bradshaw; John Ormsby Vandeleur	Member of Parliament for Carlow; 1790–1796; With: John Ormsby Vandeleur	Succeeded by Henry Prittie; William Elliot
Parliament of the United Kingdom
Preceded by Abel Ram; William Congreve Alcock	Member of Parliament for County Wexford; 10 October 1812–21 July 1818; With: Robert Carew	Succeeded by Robert Carew; Caesar Colclough
Baronetage of Ireland
New creation	Baronet (of Newton Ormond); 1780–1 February 1824	Extinct
