= Nicholas Carew (died 1311) =

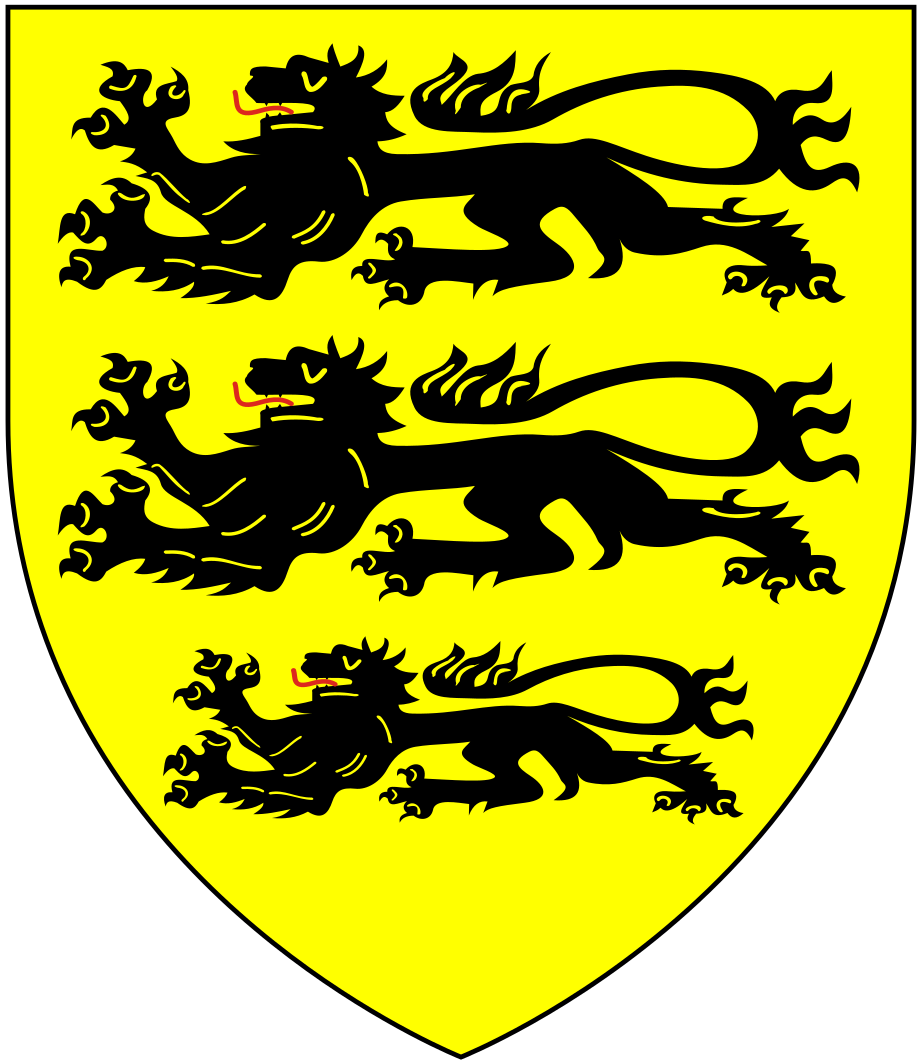
Arms of Carew: Or, three lions passant in pale sable These were the arms shown on the seal of Nic(olae)us de Carru (c. 1255 – 1311), appended to the Barons' Letter, 1301 and blazoned in the 1301 Caerlaverock Roll of Arms

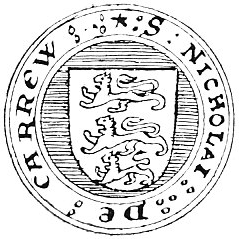
Seal of Nicholas Carew (died 1311) affixed to the Barons' Letter of 1301 showing: Three lions passant in pale with inscription: S(IGILLUM) NICHOLAI DE CARREW ("seal of Nicholas de Carew")

Nicholas Carew (died 1311), Lord of Moulsford, was a baron of medieval England who took part in the Wars of Scottish Independence.

He was feudal lord of Carew Castle in Pembrokeshire, feudal lord of Odrone (mod. Idrone, County Carlow) in Ireland and lord of the manor of Moulsford in Berkshire (since 1974 in Oxfordshire), was a soldier. He was the first of the Carew family to form a connection with the English county of Devon, where his descendants became very prominent until modern times. His descendants obtained three Carew baronetcies and four peerage titles, namely Baron Carew (1605) in the Peerage of England (for Sir George Carew (1555–1629), created in 1626 Earl of Totnes) and Baron Carew (1834) in the Peerage of Ireland and Baron Carew (1838) of Castle Boro in the County of Wexford, in the Peerage of the United Kingdom (both for Robert Shapland Carew (1787–1856)).

== Origins ==
He was the eldest son and heir of Nicholas de Carew (died 1297), feudal lord of Carew Castle in Pembrokeshire, lord of the manor of Moulsford in Berkshire and jure uxoris feudal lord of Odrone, by his wife Avice Tuitt, daughter and heiress of Richard Tuitt of Marston in County Westmeath, Ireland, whose family had acquired the Barony of Odrone by an earlier marriage to the heiress of Odrone.

== Career ==
As Nic(olae)us de Carru, D(omi)n(u)s de Mulesford ("Nicholas de Carew, lord of the manor of Moulsford") he was one of 103 signatories of the Barons' Letter of 1301 addressed to Pope Boniface VIII as a repudiation of his claim of feudal overlordship of Scotland and as a defence of the rights of King King Edward I of England as overlord of that kingdom.

== "Baron Carew" ==
In 1300–1 he was summoned to Parliament by writ of King Edward I (1272–1307) as Dominus de Moulsford ("lord of the manor of Moulsford") by which he is deemed to have become Baron Carew. He is called "Baron Carew" in various sources, but a peerage title Baron Carew at this early date is not mentioned in the authoritative Complete Peerage (1887–98) by George Edward Cokayne. Pole however states that he was summoned to Parliament by writ of King Edward I (1272–1307), which would have made him a baron. If so, there is no clear descent of such barony, and no explanation of why it had no clear ending. According to Debrett's Peerage and Baronetage, 1968: "For several generations the heads of the family are described as Barons of Carew and Hidron, but none of them sat in Parliament with the exception of Nicholas de Carew who subscribed to the celebrated Barons' letter to the Pope in 1300".

== Caerlaverock Roll ==
He was present at the Siege of Caerlaverock Castle in Scotland in 1301, during which his armorials were amongst those blazoned in French verse by English heralds in the Caerlaverock Roll of Arms, as follows:

An vaillant home e de grant los
O lui, Nichole de Karru,
Dont meinte foiz orent paru
Li fait en couvert e en lande
Sur la felloune gent d'Irlande;
Baniere ot jaune bien passable,
O treis lyouns passans de sable.

("A valliant man ... Nicholas de Carew, who many times appeared ... a banner of gold ... three lions passant of sable")

== Marriage and children ==
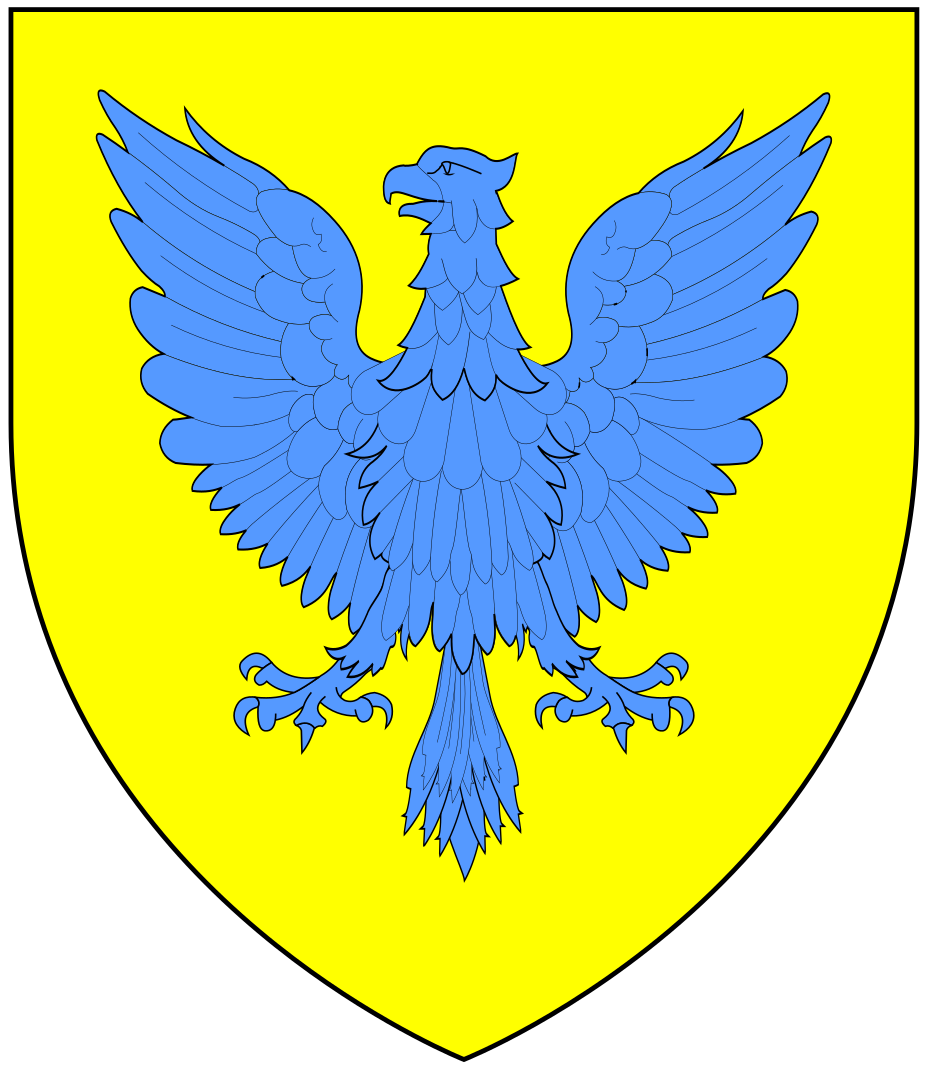
Arms of Peverell of Ermington: Or, an eagle displayed azure

He married Amicia (or Amy) Peverell, daughter of Hugh Peverell lord of the manor of Ermington in Devon, and heiress of her brother Sir John Peverell of Ermington, the last in the male line. By Amicia he had children including:

- John Carew (died 1324), eldest son and heir, who married twice:
  - Firstly to Elinor de Mohun, daughter and heiress of Sir William de Mohun of Mohuns Ottery in the parish of Luppit, Devon, by whom he had a son Nicholas Carew (died 1323) who married Elinor Talbot, daughter of Richard Lord Talbot,(sic, Vivian, 1895) (should be Sir Richard Talbot, who signed and sealed the Barons' Letter, 1301 and held the manor of Eccleswall in Herefordshire in right of his wife Sarah, sister of William de Beauchamp, 9th Earl of Warwick) but died childless. Sir William de Mohun of Mohuns Ottery was a younger son of Reginald de Mohun (1206–1258), feudal baron of Dunster (son), by his second wife Isabel de Ferrers, widow of Gilbert Basset (died 1241) and daughter of William de Ferrers, 5th Earl of Derby (1193–1254) by his wife Sibyl Marshal, a daughter and co-heiress of William Marshal, 1st Earl of Pembroke (1146/7-1219). Reginald de Mohun gave the manor of Ottery to his younger son Sir William Mohun.
  - Secondly John Carew married Joan Talbot, daughter of Sir Gilbert Talbot, by whom he had a son John Carew (died 1363), the heir of his half-brother Nicholas Carew (died 1323), from whom he inherited Mohuns Ottery, an important future seat of the Carew family. Joan Talbot survived him and remarried to John Dartmouth (alias Tuckett).
- Thomas de Carew (died 1331).
- William de Carew (died 1359), died childless.
- David de Carew

Sometimes claimed to be a son but more likely a grandson was Nicholas Carew (died 1390), of Beddington in Surrey, Keeper of the Privy Seal during the reign of King Edward III. He married Lucy, daughter and heiress of Sir Richard Willoughby (c. 1290 – 1362), Chief Justice of the King's Bench and widow of the MP Sir Thomas Huscarle (d. by 1352), of Purley Magna in Berkshire, and his descendants lived at Beddington for several generations.

== Landholdings ==
Through his wife he inherited several manors including:

- Weston Peverell, near Plymouth;
- Mamhead
- Ashford
- Galmeton

== Sources ==
- Vivian, Lt.Col. J.L., (Ed.) The Visitations of the County of Devon: Comprising the Heralds' Visitations of 1531, 1564 & 1620, Exeter, 1895, pedigree of Carew, esp. pp. 133–4
- Pole, Sir William (died 1635), Collections Towards a Description of the County of Devon, Sir John-William de la Pole (ed.), London, 1791, especially pp. 129–31 and 333-4, descent of Carew.
