= Baron Carew =

Extinct barony in the Peerage of England

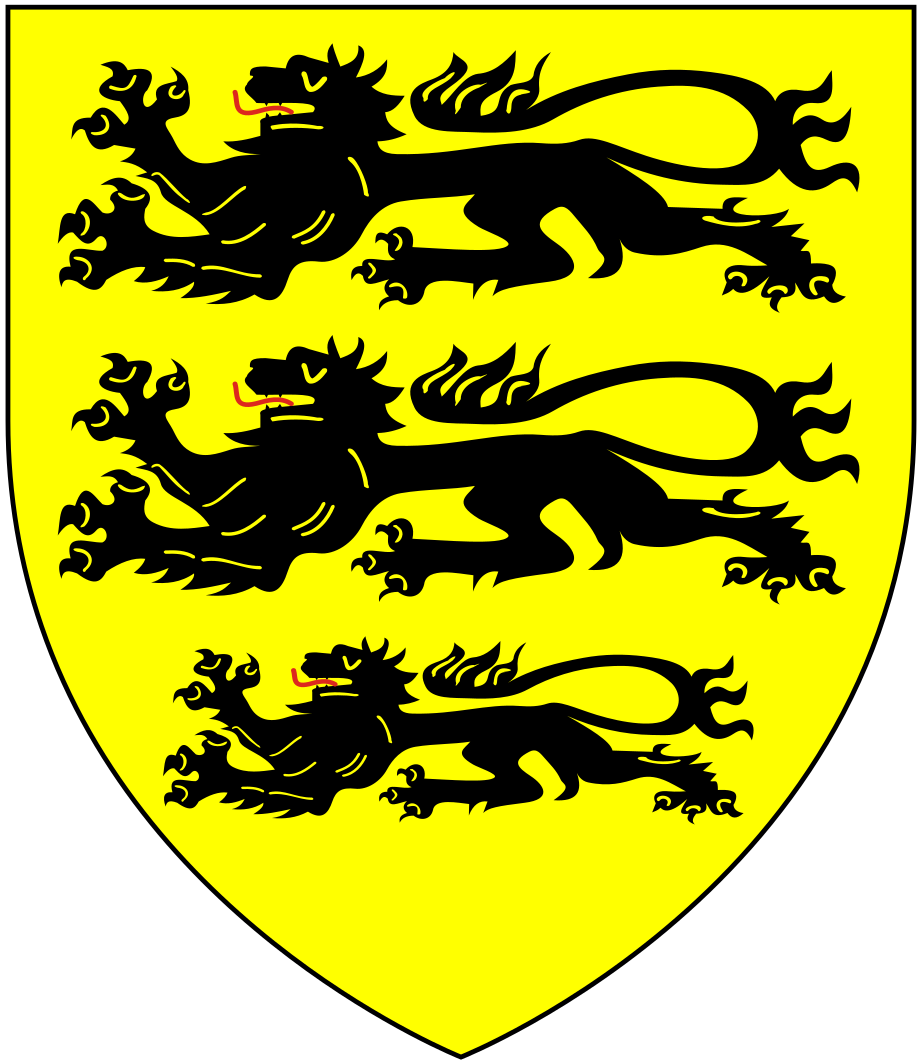
Arms of Carew: Or, three lions passant in pale sable These were the arms shown on the seal of "Nicholas de Carreu" (c.1255–1311), appended to the Barons' Letter, 1301, which he joined as "Lord of Mulesford" and which were blazoned for the same bearer in the Caerlaverock Poem or Roll of Arms of 1300, when he was present at the Siege of Caerlaverock Castle. From him are descended the Carew baronets of Antony and of Haccombe, the Earl of Totnes and Baron Carew

Baron Carew is a title that has been created three times. The first creation was in the Peerage of England in 1605. The first recipient, Sir George Carew (1555–1629), was later made Earl of Totnes in 1626. Both titles became extinct on his death as he left no heirs.

The next two creations were in favour of the same person, Robert Shapland Carew (1787–1856), who had previously represented County Wexford in the House of Commons and served as Lord Lieutenant of County Wexford. In 1834 he was created Baron Carew in the Peerage of Ireland and in 1838 he was made Baron Carew, of Castle Boro in the County of Wexford, in the Peerage of the United Kingdom. His eldest son, the second Baron, sat as Liberal Member of Parliament for County Waterford and was Lord Lieutenant of County Wexford.

On the death of his younger son, the fourth Baron, this line of the family failed. The late Baron was succeeded by his first cousin, the fifth Baron. He was the son of the Hon. Shapland Francis Carew, younger son of the first Baron. His son, the sixth Baron, assumed in 1938 by deed poll the additional surname of Conolly, which was that of his maternal grandfather. The seventh Baron was a distinguished equestrian, who represented Ireland in the Olympic Games. As of 2024 the titles are held by his son, the eighth Baron, who succeeded in that year.

Between 1956 and 1965 the sixth Baron was the owner of Castletown House and Estate in County Kildare, regarded as one of Ireland's finest country houses and now a museum open to the public and in the ownership of the Irish State.

The original family seat was Woodstown House in County Waterford, but is now Donadea House, near Naas, County Kildare.

== Barons Carew, first creation (1605) ==
- see Earl of Totnes

== Barons Carew, second and third creations (1834, 1838) ==
- Robert Shapland Carew, 1st Baron Carew (1787–1856)
- Robert Shapland Carew, 2nd Baron Carew (1818–1881)
- Robert Shapland George Julian Carew, 3rd Baron Carew (1860–1923)
- George Patrick John Carew, 4th Baron Carew (1863–1926)
- Gerald Shapland Carew, 5th Baron Carew (1860–1927)
- William Francis Conolly-Carew, 6th Baron Carew (1905–1994)
- Patrick Thomas Conolly-Carew, 7th Baron Carew (1938–2024)
- William Patrick Conolly-Carew, 8th Baron Carew (born 1973)

The heir apparent is the present holder's son, the Hon. Patrick Edward Conolly-Carew (born 2002).

=== Title succession chart ===
Title succession chart, Barons Carew.

Robert Carew; 1st Baron Carew; 1787–1856
Robert Carew; 2nd Baron Carew; 1818–1881	Hon. Shapland Carew; 1827–1892
Robert Carew; 3rd Baron Carew; 1860–1923	George Carew; 4th Baron Carew; 1863–1926	Gerald Carew; 5th Baron Carew; 1860–1927
William Conolly-Carew; 6th Baron Carew; 1905–1994
Patrick Conolly-Carew; 7th Baron Carew; 1938–2024
William Conolly-Carew; 8th Baron Carew born 1973
Hon. Patrick Conolly-Carew born 2002

=== Line of succession ===
Line of succession
- Robert Shapland Carew, 1st Baron Carew (1787–1856)
  - Robert Shapland Carew, 2nd Baron Carew (1818–1881)
    - Robert Shapland George Julian Carew, 3rd Baron Carew (1860–1923)
    - George Patrick John Carew, 4th Baron Carew (1863–1926)
  - Hon. Shapland Francis Carew (1827–1892)
    - Gerald Shapland Carew, 5th Baron Carew (1860–1927)
      - William Francis Conolly-Carew, 6th Baron Carew (1905–1994)
        - Patrick Thomas Conolly-Carew, 7th Baron Carew (1938–2024)
          - William Patrick Conolly-Carew, 8th Baron Carew (born 1973)
            - (1) Hon. Patrick Edward Conolly-Carew (born 2002)
        - (2) Hon. Gerald Edward Ian Maitland-Carew (born 1941)
          - (3) Edward Ian Conolly Maitland-Carew (born 1976)
            - (4) Thomas Francis Conolly Maitland-Carew (born 2015)
          - (5) Peter Gerald Maitland-Carew (born 1979)
            - (6) Lochie Thomas Maitland-Carew (born 2008)
            - (7) Geordie William Ivo Maitland-Carew (born 2013)
