= Thomas Mackesy =

Irish doctor and politician

Thomas Lewis Mackesy
- Born: 1790; Waterford, Ireland
- Died: 8 April 1869 (aged 78–79); Waterford, Ireland
- Education: Royal College of Surgeons in Ireland
- Occupations: Doctor, politician
- Known for: Mayor of Waterford

Thomas Lewis Mackesy FRCSI (1790 – 8 April 1869) was an Irish surgeon who was Mayor of Waterford. He was at the Battle of Waterloo and in 1862 was elected the first President of the Royal College of Surgeons in Ireland from outside Dublin.

== Life ==
Mackesy was born in Waterford, Ireland, the son of an apothecary. After some involvement in the Battle of Waterloo (1815), he went on to train in Dublin for the office of assistant-surgeon in the army.

He spent seven years abroad with the army before returning to Waterford where he was appointed Surgeon to the Leper and Fanning Hospitals in Waterford and took an interest in the public life of his native city. He married Mary Poulter.

He was elected Mayor of Waterford in 1841 having served on Waterford Corporation.

His son Joseph Poulter Mackesy (1816–1866) followed in his father's footsteps and became a Fellow of the Royal College of Surgeons in Ireland and an Alderman of Waterford Corporation.

== Arms ==
Coat of arms of Thomas Mackesy

Notes
Granted 8 May 1861 by Sir John Bernard Burke, Ulster King of Arms
Crest
Out of a mural crown Proper a demi-eagle Or charged on the breast with a sword entwined with a snake in pale as in the arms.
Escutcheon
Argent a dexter arm couped in fess from the sinister side Proper sleeved Gules cuffed Azure holding a sword entwined with a snake also Proper all between two flaunches of the fourth each charged with a demi-eagle displayed couped Or.
Motto
In Deo Manuque Fides
