= Mackintosh baronets of Mackintosh (1812) =

The Mackintosh baronetcy, of Mackintosh in the County of Glamorgan, was created in the Baronetage of the United Kingdom on 30 December 1812 for Aeneas Mackintosh. He was an author as well as Chief of Clan Mackintosh and Captain of Clan Chattan. The title became extinct on his death in 1820.

== Mackintosh baronets, of Mackintosh (1812) ==
- Sir Aeneas Mackintosh, 1st Baronet (died 1820)

== Notes ==
Baronetage of the United Kingdom
| Preceded by Ormsby baronets | Mackintosh baronets of Mackintosh; 30 December 1812 | Succeeded by Leeds baronets |
