= Gerald Carew, 5th Baron Carew =

British and Irish noble

The Right Honourable The Lord Carew

Member of the House of Lords
- Lord Temporal
- In office 21 April 1926 – 3 October 1927
- Preceded by: The 4th Baron Carew
- Succeeded by: The 6th Baron Carew

Personal details
- Born: Gerald Shapland Carew; 26 April 1860
- Died: 3 October 1927 (aged 67)

Gerald Shapland Carew, 5th Baron Carew (26 April 1860 – 3 October 1927), was an Anglo-Irish hereditary peer.

== Early life and education ==
Carew was the son of the Hon. Shapland Francis Carew, younger son of Robert Carew, 1st Baron Carew, and his wife Lady Hester Georgiana Browne, daughter of Howe Browne, 2nd Marquess of Sligo.

== Later life ==
Carew succeeded to the Carew baronies and to a seat in the House of Lords upon the death of his childless first cousin George Carew, 4th Baron Carew, in April 1926.

== Marriage and children ==
Carew married Catherine Conolly, daughter of Thomas Conolly. They had three sons:

- William Francis Conolly-Carew, 6th Baron Carew (23 April 1905 – 27 June 1994)
- Major The Hon. Gavin George Carew (21 September 1906 – 11 October 1997)
- Lieutenant Commander The Hon. Peter Cuthbert Carew (31 December 1908 – 17 January 1980)

== Death ==
Lord Carew died in October 1927 at the age of 67. He was succeeded in the baronies by his eldest son, William.

Peerage of Ireland
Preceded by George Carew	Baron Carew; 2nd creation 1926–1927	Succeeded by William Carew
Peerage of the United Kingdom
Preceded by George Carew	Baron Carew; 3rd creation 1926–1927; Member of the House of Lords (1926–1927)	Succeeded by William Carew
