= Ormsby baronets =

Extinct baronetcy in the Baronetage of the United Kingdom

Escutcheon of the Ormsby baronets

The Ormsby Baronetcy, of Cloghans in the County of Mayo, was a title in the Baronetage of the United Kingdom. It was created on 29 December 1812 for Charles Ormsby, Member of Parliament for Carlow between 1801 and 1806. The title became extinct on the death of the third Baronet in 1833.

== Ormsby baronets, of Cloghans (1812) ==
- Sir Charles Montagu Ormsby, 1st Baronet (1767–1818)
- Sir James Ormsby, 2nd Baronet (1796–1821)
- Sir Thomas Ormsby, 3rd Baronet (1797–1833)

Baronetage of the United Kingdom
Preceded by Kaye baronets	Ormsby baronets of Cloghans; 29 December 1812	Succeeded by Mackintosh baronets
