= Edward Blount (MP) =

British politician and activist (1769-1843)

Edward Blount (18 July 1769 – 20 March 1843) was a British politician, and activist in the cause of civil rights for Roman Catholics. He was a Whig Member of Parliament for Steyning, Sussex from 1830 till the constituency was abolished in 1832.

Parliament of the United Kingdom
Preceded by Peter du Cane; George Philips	Member of Parliament for Steyning; 1830 – 1832; With: George Philips	Constituency abolished
