= Patrick Walsh (friar) =

Irish ambassador and friar

Sir Patrick Walsh (fl. 1580 – c.1610) was an Irish ambassador and friar. Patrick Walsh was a knight and wealthy merchant in the city of Waterford, becoming Mayor of Waterford in 1578. He was an older half-brother of Thomas Walsh, Archbishop of Cashel 1626–54. Another brother, Richard Walsh, was a Jesuit. (1992, n. 28, p. 191).

== Biography ==
It was in his capacity as Mayor that Walsh first came to notice, acting as a "representative from the ‘’Urbs Intacta’’ to Queen Elizabeth". Marmaduke Middleton, Protestant Bishop of Waterford and Lismore, wrote of Walsh in a letter to Sir Francis Walsingham dated 29 June 1580, describing the citizens of Waterford as "stiffnecked, stubborn, papistical and incorrigible’’. He attributed their stance to Walsh, saying of him:

‘’the greatest support of this is he, which was the last year mayor, whose name is Sir Patrick Walsh, a counterfeit Christian, and a great enemy of God’s truth. And [he] is coming over to obtain something of her Majesty to maintain his knighthood withal ... Wherein I dare be bold to say, no man exceedeth the said Sir Patrick, with whom, the living God knoweth, the whole city are partakers.’’

Walsh was married. However, he and his wife entered into a pact that upon the death of one of them, the survivor could enter a religious order. In 1598, after the death of his wife, Walsh sailed to France, joining the Capuchin order at Paris, where he died about 1610. Yet even up to the time of his death his advice was regularly sought by citizens of Waterford on municipal matters, such was his esteem in the town.

F. X. Martin writes "Though it is probable that Walsh knew Francis Lavalin Nugent at Paris he did not join the Irish mission. Like Patrick Bath he died before it became a reality in 1615 with the acquisition of a friary at Charleville in northern France as headquarters for the Irish Capuchins."

- ’So Manie in the Verie Prime and Spring of their Youth, Manie of them Heirs of Lande’: The Friars of the Irish Capuchin Mission in Northern France and the Low Countries, 1591–1641", p. 10, F. X. Martin, in "Ireland and France: a Bountiful Friendship", pp. 7–16, ed. Hayley and Murray, Colin Smythe Ltd., 1992.
