= William Conolly-Carew, 6th Baron Carew =

Irish peer (1905–1994)

The Right Honourable The Lord Carew CBE CStJ

Member of the House of Lords
- Lord Temporal
- In office 3 October 1927 – 27 June 1994
- Preceded by: The 5th Baron Carew
- Succeeded by: The 7th Baron Carew

Personal details
- Born: William Francis Carew; 23 April 1905
- Died: 27 June 1994 (aged 89)
- Party: Crossbencher

William Francis Conolly-Carew, 6th Baron Carew (23 April 1905 – 27 June 1994), was an Anglo-Irish hereditary peer who was aide-de-camp to the Governor of Bermuda, Sir Thomas Cubbitt, between 1931 and 1936.

== Early life and education ==
Born William Francis Carew, he assumed the additional surname of Conolly by deed poll in 1938. He was the eldest son of Gerald Carew, 5th Baron Carew, and Catherine Conolly, daughter of Thomas Conolly of Castletown, Celbridge, County Kildare.

Carew was educated at Wellington College and the Royal Military College, Sandhurst.

== Career ==
Carew was gazetted into the Duke of Cornwall's Light Infantry in 1925 and served during the Second World War as a captain, reaching the brevet rank of major.

He inherited the Carew baronies and a seat in the House of Lords upon the death of his father in 1927.

== Honours ==
Carew was appointed a Commander of the Order of the British Empire (CBE) in 1966 and was also a Companion of the Order of Saint John (CStJ).

== Marriage and children ==
Carew was married on 3 June 1937 to Lady Sylvia Gwendoline Eva Maitland (1913–1991), a daughter of Ian Maitland, 15th Earl of Lauderdale, and his wife Ethel Mary (née Bell-Irving). They had four children:

- Patrick Thomas Conolly-Carew, 7th Baron Carew (6 March 1938 – 18 December 2024)
- Hon. Diana Sylvia Conolly-Carew (born 7 April 1940), married 1985 Baron Alexis Petrovich Wrangel (1922–2005), son of Baron Pyotr Wrangel.
- Hon. Gerald Edward Ian Maitland-Carew (born 28 December 1941)
- Hon. Sarah Catherine Conolly-Carew (born 6 November 1944)

== Death ==
Carew died in June 1994 at the age of 89. He was succeeded in the baronies by his elder son, Patrick.

== Bibliography ==
- Who's Who, London: Black, 1945, p. 439.
- Kidd, Charles & Williamson, David (eds.) (1990) Debrett's Peerage and Baronetage (1990 edition). New York: St Martin's Press,
- Leigh Rayment's Peerage Pages

Peerage of Ireland
Preceded by Gerald Carew	Baron Carew; 2nd creation 1927–1994	Succeeded by Patrick Conolly-Carew
Peerage of the United Kingdom
Preceded by Gerald Carew	Baron Carew; 3rd creation 1927–1994; Member of the House of Lords (1927–1994)	Succeeded by Patrick Conolly-Carew
