= List of mayors of Waterford =

This is a list of mayors of Waterford.

== Overview ==
The mayor of Waterford wears a traditional gold chain during official duties.

The links on the chain commemorate individual past mayors, though the families of the mayors themselves are responsible for providing each link. Thus the number of links is far less than the total number of past mayors. Links may be added retroactively, usually by the descendants of past mayors.

Mayors are listed by year. Sources (Years 1377–1891), (Other years).

== 1284–1299 ==
- 1284 – Roger le Lom
- 1285 – Roger le Lom
- 1285 – 1286 There were no mayors. The city was administered by the Escheator of Ireland.
- 1294 – John le Tyler
- 1295 – John le Tyler
- 1296 – Ralph de Hampton
- 1297 – Ralph de Hampton
- 1298 – Ralph de Hampton
- 1299 – Ralph de Hampton

== 1300–1399 ==
- 1300 – Ralph de Hampton
- 1301 – 1376 ***Require mayors for these dates.
- 1377 – William Lumbard
- 1378 – William Lumbard
- 1379 – William Chapman
- 1380 – William Madan
- 1381 – Philip Spell
- 1382 – Robert Sweetman
- 1383 – Robert Sweetman
- 1384 – William Lumbard
- 1385 – William Forstall
- 1386 – Robert Bruce
- 1387 – William Lumbard
- 1388 – William Poer
- 1389 – William Poer
- 1390 – Milo Poer
- 1391 – Walter Spence
- 1392 – William Chapman
- 1393 – John Rocket
- 1394 – Milo Poer
- 1395 – William Forstall
- 1396 – William Attamen
- 1397 – William Lincolne
- 1398 – Andrew Archer
- 1399 – John Eyenas

== 1400–1499 ==
- 1400 – William Forstall
- 1401 – John Lumbard
- 1402 – John Lumbard
- 1403 – Nicholas Lumbard
- 1404 – William Poer
- 1405 – William Poer
- 1406 – Richard Brushbone
- 1407 – John Walsh
- 1408 – John Lumbard
- 1409 – Walter Attamen
- 1410 – William Power
- 1411 – John Roberts
- 1412 – John Rocket
- 1413 – Simon Wickins
- 1414 – John White
- 1415 – Nicholas Holland
- 1416 – William Russell
- 1417 – William Lincolne (or Lyncoll)
- 1418 – John Lumbard
- 1419 – John Lumbard
- 1420 – Roger Walsh
- 1421 – Simon Wickins
- 1422 – Thomas O'Kabrane
- 1423 – William Lincolne
- 1425 – Thomas O'Kabrane
- 1426 – William Lincolne
- 1427 – Peter Strong
- 1428 – Robert Lincolne
- 1429 – Peter Rice
- 1430 – Walter Attam
- 1431 – Peter Strong
- 1432 – Gilbert Dyer
- 1433 – Foulke Commerford
- 1434 – Peter Strong
- 1435 – Nicholas Gough
- 1436 – John Corr
- 1437 – John White
- 1438 – Nicholas Mulgan
- 1439 – John Rope
- 1440 – Thomas Hull
- 1441 – Nicholas Gough
- 1442 – William Stattadel
- 1443 – Nicholas Mulgan
- 1444 – Nicholas Mulgan
- 1445 – William Corr
- 1446 – William Corr
- 1447 – John Rope
- 1448 – Foulke Commerford
- 1449 – William Lincolne
- 1450 – William White
- 1451 – Richard Walsh
- 1452 – Maurice Wise
- 1453 – Patrick Rope
- 1454 – John Madan
- 1455 – William White
- 1456 – Robert Butler
- 1457 – John Madan
- 1458 – Richard Walsh
- 1459 – William White
- 1460 – Laurence Dobbin
- 1461 – John May
- 1462 – John Sherlock
- 1463 – John Corr
- 1464 – John Corr
- 1465 – Peter Strong
- 1466 – Nicholas Mulgan
- 1467 – John Butler
- 1468 – John Mulgan
- 1469 – James Rice
- 1470 – Nicholas Devereux
- 1471 – James Rice
- 1472 – James Rice
- 1473 – John Corr
- 1474 – John Corr
- 1475 – Peter Sherlock
- 1476 – Peter Lovet
- 1477 – James Rice
- 1478 – William Lincolne
- 1479 – John Corr
- 1480 – James Sherlock
- 1481 – Maurice Wyse
- 1482 – John Butler
- 1483 – James Rice
- 1484 – James Rice
- 1485 – Richard Strong
- 1486 – James Rice
- 1487 – John Butler
- 1488 – James Rice
- 1489 – Robert Lumbard
- 1490 – William Lumbard
- 1491 – Patrick Rope
- 1492 – William Lumbard
- 1493 – Robert Butler
- 1494 – Henry Fagan
- 1495 – John Madan

Charter was revoked between the years 1495 to 1509 inclusive for an unknown reason.

== 1500–1599 ==
- 1510 – John Madan
- 1511 – John Butler
- 1512 – Nicholas Madan
- 1513 – John Madan
- 1514 – James Butler
- 1515 – Nicholas Madan
- 1516 – John Madan
- 1517 – Patrick Rope
- 1518 – Nicholas Madan
- 1519 – James Sherlock
- 1520 – John Madan
- 1521 – Richard Walsh
- 1522 – Peter Walsh
- 1523 – Nicholas Wyse
- 1524 – John Madan
- 1525 – James Sherlock
- 1526 – John Morgan
- 1527 – Nicholas Wyse
- 1528 – Patrick Walsh
- 1529 – James Sherlock
- 1530 – John Morgan
- 1531 – Nicholas Wyse
- 1532 – Patrick Walsh
- 1533 – William Wyse
- 1534 – James Sherlock
- 1535 – William Lincolne
- 1536 – John Morgan
- 1537 – Thomas Lumbard
- 1538 – Edward Sherlock
- 1539 – James Walsh
- 1540 – William Wyse
- 1541 – Peter Dobbin
- 1542 – James White
- 1543 – William Lincolne
- 1544 – Edward Sherlock
- 1545 – Thomas Lumbard
- 1546 – Peter Dobbin
- 1547 – James Walsh
- 1548 – James Madan
- 1549 – Thomas Sherlock
- 1550 – Walter Coltie
- 1551 – David Walsh
- 1552 – Peter Dobbin
- 1553 – James Dobbin
- 1554 – Maurice Wyse
- 1555 – Robert Walsh
- 1556 – Henry Walsh
- 1557 – Peter Dobbin
- 1558 – Maurice Wyse
- 1559 – John Sherlock
- 1560 – Peter Strong
- 1561 – John Wise
- 1562 – James Walsh
- 1563 – Henry Wyse
- 1564 – Peter Walsh
- 1565 – John Neal
- 1566 – Peter Alyward
- 1567 – Patrick Dobbin
- 1568 – Nicholas Alyward
- 1569 – Peter Walsh
- 1570 – Phillip Cummerford
- 1571 – George Wyse
- 1572 – John Maden
- 1573 – John Maden
- 1574 – James Walsh
- 1575 – James Butler
- 1576 – Peter Sherlock
- 1577 – Peter Alyward
- 1578 – Sir Patrick Walsh
- 1579 – Patrick Dobbin
- 1580 – James Sherlock
- 1581 – Richard Lestrange
- 1582 – Nicholas Lee
- 1583 – James Maden
- 1584 – John Leonard
- 1585 – Nicholas Cummerford
- 1586 – James Wyse
- 1592 – Nicholas Aylward
- 1593 – Patrick Morgan
- 1594 – Paul Sherlock
- 1595 – James White.
- 1596 – Thomas Wadding
- 1597 – Paul Strong
- 1598 – Thomas White
- 1599 – Richard Madan

== 1600–1699 ==
- 1600 – Sir Edward Gough
- 1601 – Robert Walsh
- 1602 – Robert Walsh
- 1603 – James Lombard
- 1604 – Richard Madan
- 1605 – Thomas Wyse
- 1606 – John Sherlock
- 1607 – Thomas Strong
- 1608 – Stephen Leonard
- 1609 – Stephen Leonard
- 1610 – James Levett
- 1611 – Richard Wadding
- 1612 – Michael Browne
- 1613 – Robert Walsh
- 1614 – Walter Sherlock
- 1615 – Nicholas White
- 1616 – John Joy
- 1617 – Alexander Brien
- From 1617 to 1626, inclusive, there was no settled form of government in the city, owing to the refusal of the Roman Catholic Mayors to take the Oath of Supremacy.
- 1626 – James Woodlock
- 1627 – Sir Peter Aylward
- 1628 – John Sherlock
- 1629 – William Dobbin
- 1630 – Robert Wyse
- 1631 – James Walsh
- 1632 – Sir Thomas Sherlock
- 1633 – Sir Thomas Gough
- 1634 – Richard Strong
- 1635 – John Skiddy
- 1636 – Richard Butler
- 1637 – James White
- 1638 – Nicholas Wyse
- 1639 – Robert Lumbard
- 1640 – Mathew Grant
- 1641 – Francis Briver
- 1642 – Thomas White
- 1643 – Redmond Gerald
- 1644 – Luke White
- 1645 – Garret Lincolne
- 1646 – Paul Wadding
- 1647 – John Bluet
- 1648 – Sir John Walsh
- 1649 – John Levett
- 1650 – John Aylward
- 1651 – From 1650 to 1658 the City was governed by Commissioners appointed by Oliver Cromwell.
- 1656 – George Cawdron
- 1657 – Thomas Watts
- 1658 – Andrew Richard
- 1659 – John Houghton
- 1660 – Sir Thomas Dancer
- 1661 – Wiliam Halsey
- 1662 – William Bolton
- 1663 – John Eyeres
- 1664 – Thomas Christmas
- 1665 – George Deyos
- 1666 – Andrew Richard
- 1667 – Thomas Exton
- 1668 – John Heavens
- 1669 – John Heavens
- 1670 – William Hurst
- 1671 – Thomas Bolton
- 1672 – Henry Aland
- 1673 – Thomas Coote
- 1674 – Joseph Ivie
- 1675 – Michael Head
- 1676 – Henry Seagar
- 1677 – William Cooper
- 1678 – William Denis
- 1679 – Richard Seay
- 1680 – Zachary Clayton
- 1681 – William Fuller
- 1682 – Richard Maybank
- 1683 – William Fuller
- 1684 – Michael Head
- 1685 – William Godrick
- 1686 – William Godrick
- 1687 – Richard Fitzgerald
- 1688 – Richard Fitzgerald
- 1689 – Richard Fitzgerald
- 1690 – David Lloyde
- 1691 – Thomas Wyse and David Lloyde
- 1692 – Nicholas Porter
- 1693 – Francis Barker
- 1694 – Joseph Hopkins
- 1695 – Richard Christmas
- 1696 – John Mason
- 1697 – Sir John Mason
- 1698 – William Smith
- 1699 – Thomas Smith

== 1700–1799 ==
- 1700 – John Head
- 1701 – Theodore Jones
- 1702 – William Weekes
- 1703 – John Lambe and John Japp
- 1704 – William Jones
- 1705 – David Lewis
- 1706 – James Eccles
- 1707 – James Eccles and David Lewis
- 1708 – David Lewis
- 1709 – Sir John Mason
- 1710 – David Lewis
- 1711 – David Lewis
- 1712 – John Mason
- 1713 – Francis Barker
- 1714 – Samuel Austin
- 1715 – Thomas Christmas
- 1716 – William Jones
- 1717 – Thomas Aikenhead
- 1718 – Thomas Aikenhead
- 1719 – Benjamin Morris
- 1720 – John Moore
- 1721 – Thomas Aikenhead
- 1722 – John Morris
- 1723 – Joseph Ivie
- 1724 – Wuham Alcock
- 1725 – Thomas Christmas
- 1726 – Simon Vashon
- 1727 – Simon Newport
- 1728 – Edward Weekes
- 1729 – Joseph Ivie
- 1730 – Henry Mason
- 1731 – Richard Weekes
- 1732 – John Moore
- 1733 – William Barker
- 1734 – Henry Mason
- 1735 – William Morgan
- 1736 – Ambrose Congreve
- 1737 – Samuel Barker
- 1738 – Simon Vashon, jun.
- 1739 – Simon Vashon, jun.
- 1740 – Robert West
- 1741 – Samuel Barker
- 1742 – Robert Glen
- 1743 – Cornelius Bolton
- 1744 – Beverley Ussher
- 1745 – William Ecles
- 1746 – Christmas Paul
- 1747 – Francis Barker
- 1748 – Thomas Christmas and Robert Glen
- 1749 – William Paul
- 1750 – William Paul
- 1751 – William Paul and George Bakas
- 1752 – Samuel Barker
- 1753 – William Alcock
- 1754 – William Morgan
- 1755 – Thomas Myles
- 1756 – Simon Newport
- 1757 – Henry Alcock
- 1758 – Thomas West
- 1759 – Benjamin Morris
- 1760 – Michael Hobbs
- 1761 – Michael Hobbs and Cornelius Bolton
- 1762 – Thomas Myles
- 1763 – George Wilkinson
- 1764 – William Alcock
- 1765 – John Lyon
- 1766 – Henry Alcock
- 1767 – William Price
- 1768 – William Alcock
- 1769 – Bolton Lee
- 1770 – Benjamin Morris
- 1771 – Francis Barker
- 1772 – William Bates
- 1773 – William Hobbs
- 1774 – John Lander
- 1775 – James Henry Reynett
- 1776 – James Henry Reynett
- 1777 – Henry Alcock, jun.
- 1778 – Simon Newport
- 1779 – Samuel Morgan
- 1780 – William Paul
- 1781 – William Alcock
- 1782 – Simon John Newport
- 1783 – James Moore
- 1784 – William Newport
- 1785 – John Alcock
- 1786 – Samuel King
- 1787 – Benjamin Morris
- 1788 – William Weekes
- 1789 – Thomas Alcock
- 1790 – John Ramsay
- 1791 – Thomas Price
- 1792 – Sir Simon Newport
- 1793 – Thomas Price and James Moore
- 1794 – Edmond Stevenson
- 1795 – Benjamin Morris, jun.
- 1796 – Simon Newport
- 1797 – James Sempill
- 1798 – Samuel Boyce
- 1799 – James Sempill

== 1800–1891 ==
- 1800 – Samuel King
- 1801 – Samuel Morgan
- 1802 – James Henry Reynett
- 1803 – Henry Alcock
- 1804 – James Henry Reynett
- 1805 – James Moore
- 1806 – Robert Lyon
- 1807 – William Alcock
- 1808 – Robert Lyon
- 1809 – John Burchall
- 1810 – Cornelius Bolton
- 1811 – John Denis
- 1812 – James Henry Reynett
- 1813 – Henry Sergeant
- 1814 – Robert Lyon
- 1815 – Harry Alcock
- 1816 – Cornelius Bolton
- 1817 – Samuel Morgan
- 1818 – Sir John Newport
- 1819 – James Hackett
- 1820 – Samuel King
- 1821 – William Murphy
- 1822 – Edward Weeks
- 1823 – James Hackett
- 1824 – Sir Simon Newport
- 1825 – John Snow
- 1826 – Edward Villiers Briscoe, mayor-elect, having died 10 September; Alderman Snow held the rod until 20 November (Ald. Snow died 22 November 1826), when, by mandamus from the King's Bench, the Common Council elected and swore in Henry Holdsworth Hunt, who died 25 June 1827, and was succeeded by Henry Alcock.
- 1827 – Thomas Carew
- 1828 – William Weekes
- 1829 – Michael Evelyn
- 1830 – Edmond Skottowe
- 1831 – Henry Alcock
- 1832 – Adam Rogers
- 1833 – William Hobbs
- 1834 – Thomas McCheane
- 1835 – Alexander Mann Alcock
- 1836 – John Harris
- 1837 – Matthew Poole
- 1838 – William M. Ardagh
- 1839 – Edward Hobson
- 1840 – Simon Newport
- 1841 – Thomas L. Mackesy, Municipal Reform Act came into operation on 7 November 1841.
- 1842 – Thomas L. Mackesy
- 1843 – Thomas Meagher
- 1844 – Thomas Meagher
- 1845 – Sir B. Morris
- 1846 – Sir B. Norris Wall
- 1847 – Owen Carroll
- 1848 – Silvester Phelan
- 1849 – James Kent
- 1850 – Richard Cooke
- 1851 – John Power
- 1852 – Michael Dobbyn
- 1853 – Thomas F. Strange
- 1854 – Henry Denny
- 1855 – John Aloysius Blake
- 1856 – John Aloysius Blake
- 1857 – John Aloysius Blake
- 1858 – John Everard Feehan
- 1859 – John Mackesy
- 1860 – Thomas Murphy
- 1861 – Pierse Cox
- 1862 – William Johnson
- 1863 – Andrew Ryan
- 1864 – John Lawler
- 1865 – John Lawler
- 1866 – P. K. Reid
- 1867 – Sir B. Morris, knt.
- 1868 – Patrick Anthony Power
- 1869 – Cornelius Redmond
- 1870 – Thomas Wilson
- 1871 – Henry Francis Slattery
- 1872 – James F. Scott
- 1873 – St. George Freeman
- 1874 – William Kent Cummins
- 1875 – John Thomas Ryan
- 1876 – John Thomas Ryan
- 1877 – Thomas Purcell
- 1878 – Patrick Manning
- 1879 – George I. Mackesy
- 1880 – Laurence A. Ryan
- 1881 – Laurence A. Ryan
- 1882 – Laurence A. Ryan
- 1883 – William Kelly
- 1884 – John Allingham
- 1885 – John Allingham
- 1886 – Richard Power
- 1887 – Richard Power
- 1888 – Thomas Toole
- 1889 – Thomas Toole
- 1890 – Thomas Toole
- 1891 – John Manning
- 1892 – John Manning
- 1893 – John Manning
- 1894 – Anthony Cadogan
- 1895 – William J. Smith
- 1896 – William J. Smith
- 1897 – James Knox
- 1898 – Henry Grainger
- 1899 – Laurence C. Strange

== 1900–1998 ==
- 1900 – Alexander Nelson
- 1901 – Richard Hearne
- 1902 – Richard Hearne
- 1903 – James A. Power
- 1904 – Sir James A. Power
- 1905 – Sir James A. Power
- 1906 – Maurice Quinlan
- 1907 – Maurice Quinlan
- 1908 – Thomas Whittle
- 1909 – Thomas Whittle
- 1910 – James Hackett
- 1911 – James Hackett
- 1912 – Michael Kirwan
- 1913 – Richard Power
- 1914 – Richard Power
- 1915 – Richard Power
- 1916 – John J. O'Sullivan
- 1917 – John J. O'Sullivan
- 1918 – David MacDonald
- 1919 – David MacDonald
- 1920 – Vincent White
- 1921 – Vincent White
- 1922 – Vincent White
- 1923 – Vincent White
- 1924 – Vincent White
- 1925 – 1926 (a) Vincent White
- 1925 – 1926 (b) Richard Keane
- 1926 – John J. Wyley
- 1927 – John J. Wyley
- 1928 – Edward Walsh
- 1929 – Edward Walsh
- 1930 – William Jones
- 1931 – William Jones
- 1932 – Matthew Cassin
- 1933 – Matthew Cassin
- 1934 – Edward Dawson
- 1935 – James Aylward
- 1936 – James Aylward
- 1937 – James Aylward
- 1938 – James Aylward
- 1939 – James Aylward
- 1940 – James Aylward
- 1941 – Thomas Dunne
- 1942 – Paul Caulfield
- 1943 – William Jones
- 1944 – Bryan Cunningham
- 1945 – William Kenneally
- 1946 – Michael Coffey
- 1947 – John F. Gloster
- 1948 – Thaddeus Lynch
- 1949 – James Croke
- 1950 – James Aylward
- 1951 – Thaddeus Lynch
- 1952 – Martin Cullen
- 1953 – Patrick Browne
- 1954 – Patrick Browne
- 1955 – Thomas Gallagher
- 1956 – Thomas Gallagher
- 1957 – Denis J. Fitzpatrick
- 1958 – Denis J. Fitzpatrick
- 1959 – Richard Jones
- 1960 – James Power
- 1961 – John Griffin
- 1962 – John Griffin
- 1963 – Thomas Brennan
- 1964 – Patrick Browne
- 1965 – Patrick Browne
- 1966 – Patrick Browne
- 1967 – Thomas Cullen
- 1968 – William Jones
- 1969 – William Jones
- 1970 – Maurice Downey
- 1971 – Timothy Galvin
- 1972 – James Quinlan
- 1973 – Thomas Brennan
- 1974 – Joseph Cummins
- 1975 – Edward A. Collins
- 1976 – William Kenneally
- 1977 – Timothy Gavin
- 1978 – Patrick Power
- 1979 – Stephen Rogers
- 1980 – Thomas Brennan
- 1981 – Thomas Browne
- 1982 – Joseph Cummins
- 1983 – Richard Jones
- 1984 – William Kenneally
- 1985 – Liam Curham
- 1986 – Brian Swift
- 1987 – David Daniels
- 1988 – Brendan Kenneally
- 1989 – Patrick Power
- 1990 – Liam Curham
- 1991 – Hilary Quinlan
- 1992 – Thomas Browne
- 1993 – Martin Cullen
- 1994 – Stephen Rogers
- 1995 – Maurice Cummins
- 1996 – Pat Power
- 1997 – Tom Cunningham
- 1998 – Brian Swift

== 1999–2013 ==
- 1999 – Pat Hayes
- 2000 – Davy Daniels
- 2001 – Hilary Quinlan
- 2002 – Oliver Clery
- 2003 – Tom Cunningham
- 2004 – Seamus Ryan
- 2005 – Davy Daniels
- 2006 – L. "Cha" O'Neill
- 2007 – Mary O'Halloran
- 2008 – Jack Walsh
- 2009 – John Halligan
- 2010 – Mary Roche
- 2011 – Pat Hayes
- 2012 – Jim Darcy
- 2013 – John Cummins

== 2014–present ==
In 2014, Waterford City and County Council was formed by the merger of Waterford City Council and Waterford County Council by the Local Government Reform Act 2014. The merged council then had a Mayor for the city and county.

Year	Mayor
2014	James Tobin
2015	John Cummins
2016	Adam Wyse
2017	Pat Nugent
2018	Declan Doocey
2019	John Pratt
2020	Damien Geoghegan
2021	Joe Kelly
2022	John O'Leary
2023	Joe Conway
2024	Jason Murphy
2025	Séamus Ryan
2026	Liam Brazil

== See also ==
- List of kings of Waterford
