= Patrick Conolly-Carew, 7th Baron Carew =

Irish equestrian (1938–2024)

The Right Honourable The Lord Carew

Member of the House of Lords
- Lord Temporal
- as a hereditary peer 27 June 1994 – 11 November 1999
- Preceded by: The 6th Baron Carew
- Succeeded by: Seat abolished (Note: Pursuant to the House of Lords Act 1999.)

Personal details
- Born: Patrick Thomas Conolly-Carew; 6 March 1938
- Died: 18 December 2024 (aged 86) Maynooth, Ireland
- Party: Crossbench
- Sports career
- Nationality: Irish
- Sport: Equestrian
Medal record
Equestrian
Representing Ireland
European Championships
Silver medal – second place	1962 Burghley	Team eventing

Patrick Thomas Conolly-Carew, 7th Baron Carew (6 March 1938 – 18 December 2024), was an Anglo-Irish equestrian and hereditary peer.

== Early life and education ==
Conolly-Carew was born on 6 March 1938, the eldest son of William Conolly-Carew, 6th Baron Carew, and his wife Lady Sylvia Gwendoline Eva Maitland, daughter of Ian Maitland, 15th Earl of Lauderdale.

He was educated at Harrow School and at the Royal Military Academy Sandhurst.

== Career ==
=== Equestrianism ===
Conolly-Carew participated in the European Eventing Championships at Burghley in 1962, where he was part of the team that won the silver medal in team eventing. He also participated in the 1968 and 1972 Summer Olympics. In the latter year he finished 38th in the individual eventing and was part of the team that finished 9th in the team eventing.

=== Politics ===
Conolly-Carew succeeded to the Carew baronies and to a seat in the House of Lords upon the death of his father in 1994. His seat was abolished by the House of Lords Act 1999. He sat as a crossbencher.

== Marriage and children ==
Conolly-Carew married Celia Mary Cubitt on 30 April 1962. She is a granddaughter of Henry Cubitt, 2nd Baron Ashcombe. They had four children:

- Hon. Virginia Mary Conolly-Carew (born 13 March 1965), married Neil S. McGrath in 1985. An equestrian like her father, she participated in the 1996 and 2000 Summer Olympics.
- Hon. Nicola Rosamond Conolly-Carew (born 23 December 1966)
- Hon. Camila Sylvia Conolly-Carew (born 26 November 1969)
- William Patrick Conolly-Carew, 8th Baron Carew (born 27 March 1973)

Lady Carew is a first cousin once removed of Queen Camilla who is a great-granddaughter of the 2nd Baron Ashcombe.

== Death ==
Lord Carew died in Maynooth, Ireland, on 18 December 2024 at the age of 86. He was succeeded in the baronies by his only son, William.

== Notes ==
Peerage of Ireland
Preceded by William Conolly-Carew	Baron Carew; 2nd creation 1994–2024	Succeeded by William Conolly-Carew
Peerage of the United Kingdom
Preceded by William Conolly-Carew	Baron Carew; 3rd creation 1994–2024; Member of the House of Lords (1994–1999)	Succeeded by William Conolly-Carew
