= Sir George Philips, 2nd Baronet =

British Whig politician

Sir George Richard Philips, 2nd Baronet (23 December 1789 – 22 February 1883) was a British Whig politician.

== Early life ==
Philips was born on 23 December 1789. He was the eldest son of Sir George Philips, 1st Baronet of Sedgley, near Manchester and Weston House, near Chipping Norton, Warwickshire.

He was educated at Eton College from 1805 to 1808, and Trinity College, Cambridge in 1808.

== Career ==
Philips was returned, like his father, on the 12th Duke of Norfolk's interest in 1818. Likewise, he signed the requisition to Tierney to lead and as regularly voted with opposition. He was Member of Parliament (MP) for Horsham from 1818 to 1820 (while below the age of 21). He is not known to have spoken in the House before 1820. He was Member for Steyning from 1820 to 1824, for Kidderminster from 1835 to 1837, and for Poole from 1837 to 1852. He succeeded his father as 2nd Baronet on 3 October 1847.

He was High Sheriff of Warwickshire from 1859 to 1860.

== Marriage and children ==
Philips married the Hon Sarah Georgina Cavendish, daughter of Richard Cavendish, 2nd Baron Waterpark, on 18 November 1819. They had three daughters:

- Juliana Cavendish Philips (16 March 1821 - 6 February 1898), married Adam Haldane-Duncan, 2nd Earl of Camperdown.
- Emily Anne Philips (16 November 1823 - 24 November 1899), married Robert Carew, 2nd Baron Carew, mother of Robert Carew, 3rd Baron Carew and George Carew, 4th Baron Carew.
- Louisa Georgiana Philips (27 February 1827 - 31 July 1870), married James Sinclair, 14th Earl of Caithness, mother of George Sinclair, 15th Earl of Caithness.

== Death ==
Sir George died on 22 February 1883 at the age of 93. As he had no son or brother, the baronetcy became extinct upon his death.

=== Descendants ===
Through his daughter Juliana, he was a grandfather of the artist and courtier Julia, Lady Abercromby in addition to Robert Haldane-Duncan, 3rd Earl of Camperdown and George Haldane-Duncan, 4th Earl of Camperdown.

== See also ==
- J. & N. Philips

Parliament of the United Kingdom
Preceded by Sir Arthur Leary Piggott; Robert Hurst	Member of Parliament for Horsham; 1818 – 1820; With: Robert Hurst	Succeeded by Sir John Aubrey; Robert Hurst
Preceded by Sir George Philips, Bt; Sir John Aubrey, Bt	Member of Parliament for Steyning; 1820 – 1832; With: Lord Henry Howard-Molyneux-Howard 1820–1824; Henry Howard 1824–1826; Peter du Cane 1826–1830; Edward Blount from 1830	Constituency abolished
Preceded by Richard Godson	Member of Parliament for Kidderminster; 1835 – 1837	Succeeded by Richard Godson
Preceded by Charles Augustus Tulk; Hon. George Stephens Byng	Member of Parliament for Poole; 1837 – 1852; With: Hon. Charles Ponsonby to 1847; George Richard Robinson 1847–1850; Henry Danby Seymour from 1850	Succeeded by George Woodroffe Franklyn; Henry Danby Seymour
Baronetage of the United Kingdom
Preceded by George Philips	Baronet (of Weston, Warwickshire)'; 1847–1883	Extinct
