= Thomas Ormsby =

English cricketer (1795–1833)

Sir Thomas Ormsby, 3rd Baronet (26 May 1795 – 9 August 1833) succeeded as 3rd Baronet in November 1821. He was a member of Marylebone Cricket Club (MCC) and made a single appearance, taking part in the 1829 Married v Single match.

== Family ==
His father was Sir Charles Montagu Ormsby and his mother was Elizabeth Kingsbury. Through his mother he was the cousin of Jane Wilde née Eglee the mother of Oscar Wilde.

== Marriage ==
He married Mary Martin Slater Rebow (1804–1843), daughter and heiress of Francis Slater Rebow. After Thomas death she remarried to John Gurdon.

== Death ==
He died suddenly in 1833 while in Cowes on board the Water Witch yacht.

At his death the title devolved on his uncle Captain Stephen Ormsby.

Baronetage of the United Kingdom
Preceded by James Ormsby	Baronet (of Cloghans); 1821–1833	Extinct

== Bibliography ==
- Haygarth, Arthur (1996) [1862]. Scores & Biographies, Volume 1 (1744–1826). Kennington: Frederick Lillywhite. ISBN 978-19-00592-23-9.
- Haygarth, Arthur (1997) [1862]. Scores & Biographies, Volume 2 (1827–1840). Kennington: Frederick Lillywhite. ISBN 978-19-00592-23-9.
