= George Carew, 4th Baron Carew =

British and Irish Baron

The Right Honourable The Lord Carew
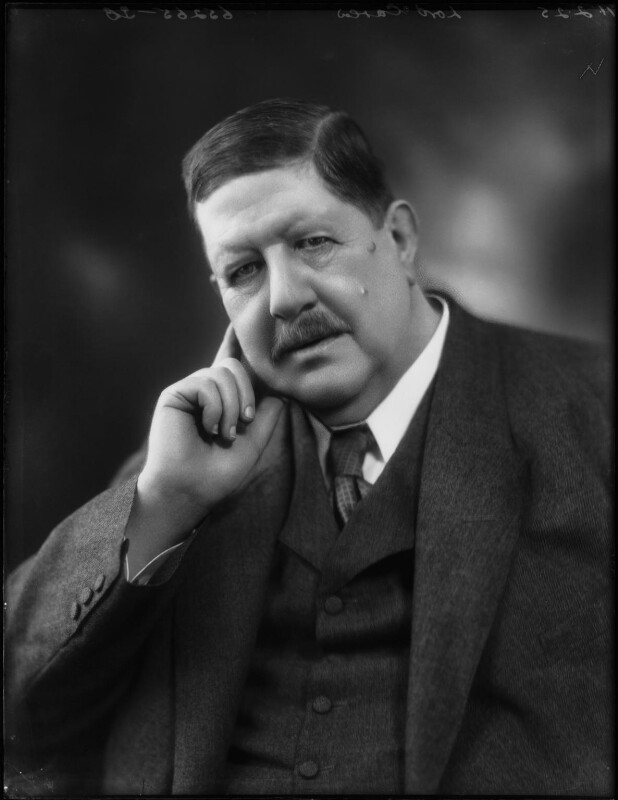
- Carew in 1925

Member of the House of Lords
- In office 29 April 1923 – 21 April 1926
- Preceded by: The 3rd Baron Carew
- Succeeded by: The 5th Baron Carew

Personal details
- Born: George Patrick John Carew; 1 February 1863
- Died: 21 April 1926 (aged 63)

George Patrick John Carew, 4th Baron Carew (1 February 1863 – 21 April 1926), was an Anglo-Irish hereditary peer.

== Early life and education ==
Carew was the younger son of Robert Carew, 2nd Baron Carew, and his wife Emily Anne Philips, daughter of Sir George Philips, 2nd Baronet. He was educated at Eton and Magdalene College, Cambridge.

== Later life ==
Carew succeeded to the Carew baronies and to a seat in the House of Lords upon the death of his childless elder brother Robert Carew, 3rd Baron Carew, in 1923.

== Marriage ==
Carew married Maud Beatrice Ramsay on 5 October 1888. They had no children.

== Death ==
Lord Carew died in April 1926 at the age of 63. As he had no son, he was succeeded in the baronies by his first cousin, Gerald.

== Notes ==
Peerage of Ireland
| Preceded by Robert Carew | Baron Carew; 2nd creation 1923–1926 | Succeeded by Gerald Carew |
Peerage of the United Kingdom
| Preceded by Robert Carew | Baron Carew; 3rd creation 1923–1926; Member of the House of Lords (1923–1926) | Succeeded by Gerald Carew |
