= Sir Charles Ormsby, 1st Baronet =

Irish politician

Sir Charles Montague Ormsby, 1st Baronet (23 April 1767 – 3 March 1818) was an Anglo-Irish Tory politician.

== Life ==
He was born 23 April 1763 in Foxford, Mayo as the firstborn son of Captain James Wilmot Ormsby and his wife Jeanne "Jane" de Gualy. His maternal grandfather was Stephen de Gualy from a Huguenot family of Languedoc.

Career

Ormsby represented Duleek in the Irish House of Commons between 1790 and the constituency's disenfranchisement under the Acts of Union 1800. He subsequently sat as a Tory for Carlow in the House of Commons of the United Kingdom from 1801 to 1806, when he was appointed Recorder of Prince of Wales Island. On 29 December 1812 he was created a baronet, of Cloghans in the Baronetage of the United Kingdom.

== Death ==
He died in 1818 at Ely Place.

and was succeeded in his title by his son, James.

== Marriage and issue ==
In 1794 Ormsby was married to Elizabeth Kingsbury at St. Anne’s Church in Dublin (b. 1780- d. ), she was daughter of Thomas Kingsbury and Thomasin Burston and came from a prosperous Protestant family in Dublin

One of her sisters Henrietta was married to Charles Maturin while another sister Sarah would become the grandmother of Oscar Wilde.

Issue

James (b. 1796 -d. 1825) Died at Malta where he had gone for his health.

Thomas (b. -d. 1833) Married to Mary Martin Slater Rebow daughter of Francis Slater Rebow.

Charles (b. ? - d.?)

Parliament of Ireland
| Preceded by Abel Ram; Andrew Ram | Member of Parliament for Duleek; 1790–1800; With: William Knott (1790–1796); William Dalrymple (1796–1798); Robert Rutledge (1798–1800) | Succeeded by Constituency disenfranchised |
Parliament of the United Kingdom
| Preceded by Hon. Francis Aldborough Prittie | Member of Parliament for Carlow; 1801–1806 | Succeeded by Michael Symes |
Baronetage of the United Kingdom
| New creation | Baronet (of Cloghans); 1812–1818 | Succeeded by James Ormsby |
