= Comptroller General of the Exchequer =

The Comptroller General of the Exchequer (formally Comptroller General of the Receipt and Issue of HM Exchequer) was a position in the Exchequer of HM Treasury between 1834 and 1866. The Comptroller General had responsibility for authorising the issue of public monies from the Treasury to government departments.

The post was created in the Act to Regulate the Office of the Receipt of his Majesty's Exchequer of 1834 (4 & 5 Will. 4 c. 15), coming into effect on 11 October that year; It replaced the positions of Auditor of the Exchequer and Clerk of the Pells, both of which were abolished. Other offices of the Exchequer, including that of Teller of the Receipt of the Exchequer, were also merged into the new Comptroller General's office. The Comptroller General was given custody of all the records of the Exchequer of Receipt, including standard weights and measures and standard pieces of gold, silver, and copper. The inaugural Comptroller was Sir John Newport, 1st Baronet. He was replaced on 18 April 1835 by Thomas Spring Rice, later Lord Monteagle of Brandon, who also served as Chancellor of the Exchequer. Lord Monteagle retained the role after he left the Cabinet in 1839, despite Lord Howick's strong opposition to the maintenance of the office.

The holder of the position received the generous salary of £2,000 per year, and the office became widely seen as an extravagant and unnecessary sinecure. Its retention was criticised by Henry Liddell in a speech in the Commons in 1840. By the 1860s Monteagle differed from the government regarding the Exchequer control over the Treasury, and the abolition of the old exchequer was already determined upon when he died in early 1866. The post was abolished by the Exchequer and Audit Departments Act 1866 by which its duties were merged with those of the Commissioners of Audit, creating the position of Comptroller and Auditor General.

== Comptrollers General of the Exchequer ==
Name	Portrait	Term of office		Political party
Sir John Newport, 1st Baronet		11 October 1834	18 April 1835	Whig
Thomas Spring Rice, later Lord Monteagle		18 April 1835	7 February 1866	Whig
Office vacant		7 February 1866	20 June 1866	
