= Newport baronets =

Extinct baronetcy in the Baronetage of Ireland

The Newport Baronetcy, of Newpark in the County of Kilkenny, was a title in the Baronetage of Ireland. It was created on 25 August 1789 for John Newport, subsequently member of parliament for Waterford. The title became extinct on the death of the second Baronet in 1859.

== Newport baronets, of Newpark (1789) ==
- Sir John Newport, 1st Baronet (1756–1843)
- Sir John Newport, 2nd Baronet (1800–1859)
