= Maynard Christian =

18th Century Irish MP

Maynard Christian (his first name was variously spelt Minard, Maynard, Mynard and Menard) was an Irish politician.

Minard Christian was born 13 August 1668 in Waterford, the son of Frederick. He matriculated at Trinity College, Dublin on 18 May 1685.

Christian was appointed recorder for Waterford in 1703 and in the same year elected MP to the Irish House of Commons in the constituency of Waterford City. He lived at Christendom, a townland in County Waterford which lay on the Kilkenny side of the river Suir, close to Waterford. He was a "stout old Hanoverian" and was active in strengthening the Protestant interest in Parliament. In 1707 he was "appointed by the house Chairman of the committee, to arrange the disputes between the corporation and merchants of the far-famed city of Derry". On 2 June 1709, he brought in a bill to ensure that the Suir was navigable from Clonmel to Thurles and to make the river Barrow navigable into the interior. In 1710, he sat on the committee of privileges, and in the same year, he introduced a bill for rebuilding the churches of the kingdom.

He died on 7 August 1714. He was unmarried, and his property was left to his sister. In his will, he left 100 pounds to fund the clothing of the poor of the Established Church, appointing the Corporation of Waterford as trustees. Every year since his death "on every Christmas Eve six coats and six cloaks are distributed by the Mayor on the recommendation of the parochial clergy".
