= Robert Shapland Carew =

Irish politician

Member of Parliament for Waterford City
- In office 1776–1801 Serving with Cornelius Bolton 1776–1783; Henry Alcock 1783–1798; William Congreve Alcock 1798–1801
- Preceded by: Cornelius Bolton and Shapland Carew
- Succeeded by: Parliament of the United Kingdom

Member of Parliament for County Wexford
- In office 27 May 1806 – 1 June 1807 Serving with John Colcough
- Preceded by: New constituency
- Succeeded by: Abel Ram and William Congreve Alcock

Personal details
- Born: 1752 Dublin, Ireland
- Died: 1829 (aged 76–77)
- Children: Robert Carew
- Education: Trinity College, Dublin

Robert Shapland Carew (1752–1829) was an Irish politician.

Carew was born in Dublin and educated at Trinity College, Dublin.

Carew represented Waterford City from 1776 to 1801 and, after the Acts of Union, County Wexford in the British House of Commons from 1806 to 1807.

His son was the 1st Baron Carew.

Parliament of Ireland
Preceded by Cornelius Bolton; Shapland Carew	Member of Parliament for Waterford City; 1776–1801; With: Cornelius Bolton 1776–1783; Henry Alcock 1783–1798; William Congreve Alcock 1798–1801	Succeeded by Parliament of the United Kingdom
Parliament of the United Kingdom
New constituency	Member of Parliament for County Wexford; 27 May 1806 – 1 June 1807; With: John Colcough	Succeeded by Abel Ram; William Congreve Alcock
