= Frederick Solly-Flood (British Army officer) =

British Army general (1829–1909)

Major-General Sir Frederick Solly-Flood KCB
- Born: 19 March 1829
- Died: 7 April 1909 (aged 80)
- Military career
- Allegiance: United Kingdom
- Branch: British Army
- Rank: Major-General
- Commands: Royal Military College, Sandhurst
- Awards: Knight Commander of the Order of the Bath

Major-General Sir Frederick Richard Solly-Flood KCB (19 March 1829 – 7 April 1909) was a British Army officer who became Commandant of the Royal Military College Sandhurst.

== Military career ==
Solly-Flood was the son of Frederick Solly-Flood (1801–1888) of Ballynaslaney House, County Wexford, the attorney-general of Gibraltar.

He was commissioned into the 53rd Regiment of Foot in 1859. He became a captain in the 82nd Regiment of Foot in 1860 and, having been appointed a Knight Commander of the Order of the Bath in 1877, became Commandant of the Royal Military College Sandhurst in 1884, remaining in that post until 1886. He subsequently commanded a District in Bombay.

He lived at Ballynaslaney House in County Wexford.

== Family ==
In 1863 he married Constance Eliza Frere of Porthmawr, Crickhowell, Breconshire. He was succeeded by his son Arthur.

Military offices
| Preceded by Frederick Middleton | Commandant of the Royal Military College Sandhurst; 1884–1886 | Succeeded by Aylmer Cameron |
