= Robert Carew, 2nd Baron Carew =

Irish Member of Parliament and peer

The Right Honourable The Lord Carew KP
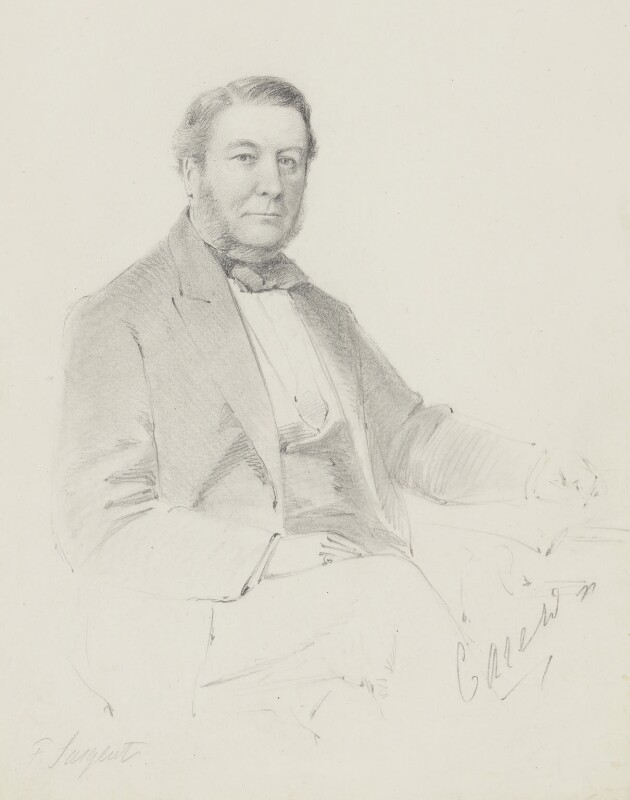
- Illustration of Carew, c. 1870s

Member of the House of Lords
- Lord Temporal
- In office 2 June 1856 – 9 September 1881
- Preceded by: The 1st Baron Carew
- Succeeded by: The 3rd Baron Carew

Personal details
- Born: Robert Shapland Carew; 28 January 1818
- Died: 9 September 1881 (aged 63)
- Party: Liberal Party

Robert Shapland Carew, 2nd Baron Carew (28 January 1818 – 9 September 1881), was an Irish Member of Parliament in the Parliament of the United Kingdom from 1840 to 1847 and a hereditary peer in the peerages of Ireland and the United Kingdom.

== Early life and education ==
Carew was born in Dublin, the son of Robert Carew, 1st Baron Carew, and his wife Jane Catherine Cliffe. He was educated at his father's alma mater Eton College and at Christ Church, Oxford.

== Career ==
Carew was Liberal Party Member of Parliament for Waterford County between 1840 and 1847. He was appointed High Sheriff of County Waterford for 1848.

On his father's death in 1856 he became the 2nd Baron Carew in both the Peerage of Ireland and the Peerage of the United Kingdom and also succeeded him as Lord Lieutenant of County Wexford, a position he held until 1881. In 1872 he was made a knight of the Order of St. Patrick (KP).

== Marriage and children ==
Carew married Emily Anne Philips, daughter of Sir George Philips, 2nd Baronet, in 1844. They had two sons:

- Robert Shapland George Julian Carew, 3rd Baron Carew (15 June 1860 – 29 April 1923)
- George Patrick John Carew, 4th Baron Carew (1 February 1863 – 21 April 1926)

== Death ==
Lord Carew died in September 1881 at the age of 63. He was succeeded in his baronies by his elder son, Robert.

== Notes ==
Parliament of the United Kingdom
Preceded by William Villiers-Stuart; John Power	Member of Parliament for County Waterford; 1840–1847; With: William Villiers-Stuart	Succeeded by Nicholas Mahon Power; Robert Keating
Honorary titles
Preceded by The Lord Carew	Lord Lieutenant of Wexford; 1856–1881	Succeeded by Lord Maurice FitzGerald
Peerage of Ireland
Preceded by Robert Carew	Baron Carew; 2nd creation 1856–1881	Succeeded by Robert Carew
Peerage of the United Kingdom
Preceded by Robert Carew	Baron Carew; 3rd creation 1856–1881; Member of the House of Lords (1856–1881)	Succeeded by Robert Carew
