= Robert Carew, 1st Baron Carew =

Irish Whig Party politician and landowner

The Right Honourable The Lord Carew KP
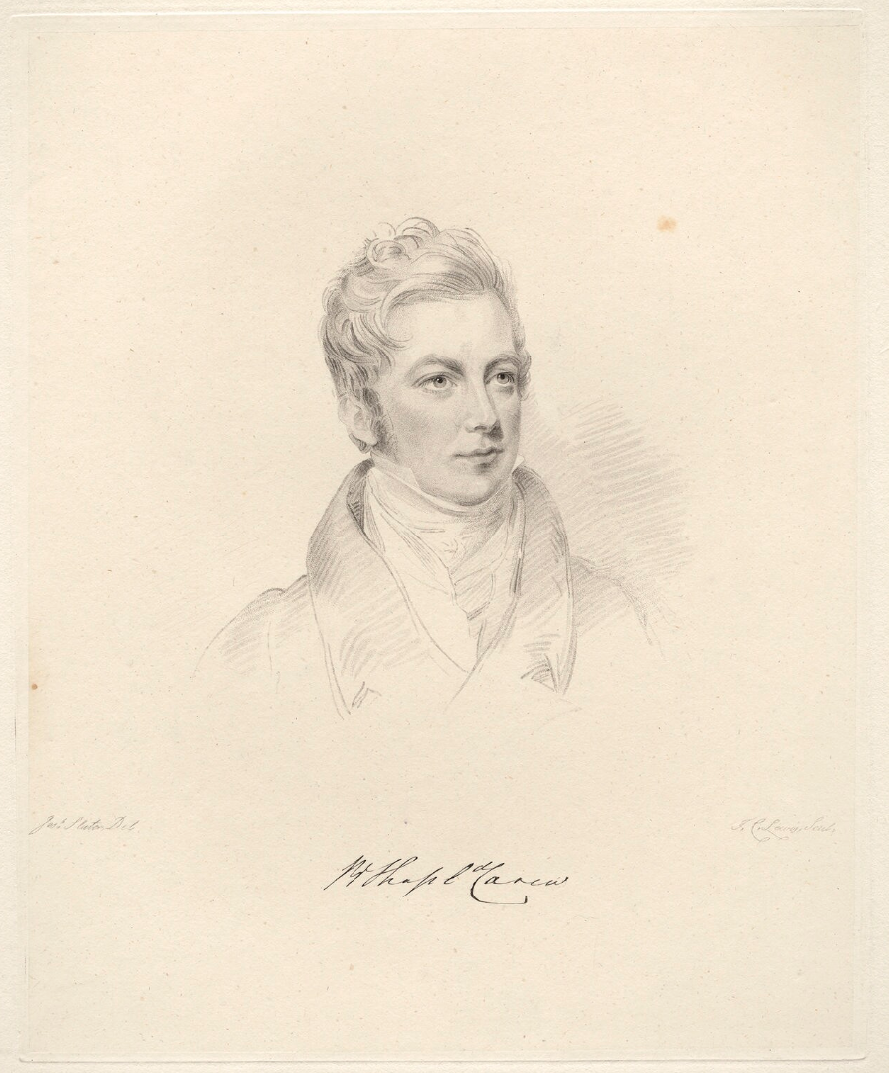
- Stipple engraving by Frederick Christian Lewis Sr., after Joseph Slater Jr.

Lord Lieutenant of Wexford
- In office 7 October 1831 – 2 June 1856
- Preceded by: Office recreated
- Succeeded by: The 2nd Baron Carew

Member of the House of Lords
- Lord Temporal
- In office 23 June 1838 – 2 June 1856
- Preceded by: Peerage created
- Succeeded by: The 2nd Baron Carew

Personal details
- Born: Robert Shapland Carew; 9 March 1787
- Died: 2 June 1856 (aged 69)
- Party: Whigs

Robert Shapland Carew, 1st Baron Carew (9 March 1787 – 2 June 1856), was an Irish Whig Party politician and landowner.

== Early life and education ==
Carew was born in Dublin, the son of Robert Shapland Carew, also an MP and landowner, and his wife Anne (née Pigott). He was educated at Eton College and Christ Church, Oxford.

== Career ==
Carew sat as Member of Parliament for County Wexford between 1812 and 1830 and again between 1831 and 1834. He also served as Lord Lieutenant of County Wexford from 1831 until his death.

== Honours ==
In 1834, Carew was raised to the Peerage of Ireland as Baron Carew, of the County of Wexford, and in 1838, he was created Baron Carew, of Castle Boro in the County of Wexford, in the Peerage of the United Kingdom. He was further honoured in 1851 when he was invested a Knight of the Order of St Patrick (KP).

== Marriage and children ==
Carew was married on 16 November 1816 to Jane Catherine Cliffe (1798–1901), daughter of Major Anthony Cliffe and Frances Deane. They had four children:

- Robert Shapland Carew, 2nd Baron Carew (28 January 1818 – 9 September 1881)
- Hon. Anne Dorothea Carew (December 1822 – 6 April 1909), married John Davies Gilbert (1811–1854).
- Hon. Shapland Francis Carew (19 February 1827 – 6 June 1892), father of Gerald Carew, 5th Baron Carew.
- Hon. Ellen Jane Carew (c. 1829 – 12 September 1902), married Charles Glynn Prideaux-Brune.

== Death ==
Lord Carew died in June 1856 at the age of 69 and was succeeded in his titles by his elder son Robert. Lady Carew died at Woodstown, County Waterford, on 12 November 1901 at the age of 103.

Parliament of the United Kingdom
Preceded by Abel Ram; William Congreve Alcock	Member of Parliament for County Wexford; 1812–1830; With: Sir Frederick Flood 1812–1818; Caesar Colclough 1818–1820; Viscount Stopford 1820–1830	Succeeded by Arthur Chichester; Viscount Valentia
Preceded by Arthur Chichester; Henry Lambert	Member of Parliament for County Wexford; 1831–1834; With: Henry Lambert	Succeeded by Henry Lambert; Cadwallader Waddy
Honorary titles
New title	Lord Lieutenant of Wexford; 1831–1856	Succeeded by The Lord Carew
Peerage of Ireland
New creation	Baron Carew; 2nd creation 1834–1856	Succeeded by Robert Carew
Peerage of the United Kingdom
New creation	Baron Carew; 3rd creation 1838–1856; Member of the House of Lords (1838–1856)	Succeeded by Robert Carew
