= Waterford City (Parliament of Ireland constituency) =

Pre-1801 Irish constituency

- Former borough constituency for the Irish House of Commons
- County: County Waterford
- Borough: Waterford

1264–1801
- Replaced by: Waterford City (UKHC)

Waterford City was a constituency represented in the Irish House of Commons from 1264 to 1800. Following the Act of Union of 1800 the borough retained one seat.

== Borough ==
This constituency was based in the city of Waterford in County Waterford. It was incorporated by charter in 1264 with freeholders and freemen.

== Members of Parliament ==
- 1376: William Shaundhull(?) and Godfrey Forstall were elected to come to England to consult with the king and council about the government of Ireland and about an aid for the king.

Election	First MP		Second MP
1560	Maurice Wise		Peter Stronge
1585	Nicholas Walsh	Speaker	Sir Patrick Walsh
1613	Richard Wadding		Paul Sherlock
1634	William Dobbin		Richard Strange
1639	Richard Butler		John Walsh
1661	William Hulsey		John Eyers
1689 Patriot Parliament	John Porter		Nicholas FitzGerald
1692	Henry Nicholls		Anthony Suxbury
1695	Richard Christmas		Anthony Suxbury
1703	Richard Christmas		Maynard Christian
1713	Thomas Christmas		Maynard Christian
1715	Thomas Christmas		John Mason
1738	Thomas Christmas		Ambrose Congreve
1739	Thomas Christmas		Robert Carew
1741	Thomas Christmas		Christmas Paul
1747	Samuel Barker		Christmas Paul
1748	Samuel Barker		Shapland Carew
1761	Cornelius Bolton		Henry Alcock
1769	Cornelius Bolton		Shapland Carew
1776	Cornelius Bolton		Robert Shapland Carew
1783	Henry Alcock		Robert Shapland Carew
1798	William Congreve Alcock		Robert Shapland Carew
1801	Replaced by Westminster constituency Waterford City		

== See also ==
- Irish House of Commons
- List of Irish constituencies

== Sources ==
- Johnston-Liik, E. M. (2002). History of the Irish Parliament, 1692–1800, Publisher: Ulster Historical Foundation (28 Feb 2002), ISBN 1-903688-09-4, on line
- T. W. Moody, F. X. Martin, F. J. Byrne, A New History of Ireland 1534-1691, Oxford University Press, 1978
- Leigh Rayment's historical List of Members of the Irish House of Commons. Cites: Johnston-Liik, Edith Mary (2002). The History of the Irish Parliament 1692-1800 (6 volumes). Ulster Historical Foundation.
- Clarke, Maude V. (1932–34). "William of Windsor in Ireland, 1369-1376". Proceedings of the Royal Irish Academy: Archaeology, Culture, History, Literature. 41: 55–130. JSTOR 25515963.
