= Lord Lieutenant of Wexford =

Irish noble title

This is a list of people who have served as Lord-Lieutenant of Wexford.

There were lieutenants of counties in Ireland until the reign of James II, when they were renamed governors. The office of Lord Lieutenant was recreated on 23 August 1831.

- The Hon. Edward FitzGerald Villiers: 1691–ca.1693 † ca.1693 Villiers family
- Arthur Gore, 2nd Earl of Arran: 1760–1768
- Arthur Annesley, 1st Earl of Mountnorris: 1768–1816 (died 1816)
- George Ogle: 1784 –1814 (died 1814)
- Charles Loftus, 1st Marquess of Ely: –1806 (died 1806)
- John Loftus, 2nd Marquess of Ely: 1805–1831
- George Annesley, 2nd Earl of Mountnorris: –1831
- Charles Tottenham: 1815–1831
- James Stopford, 3rd Earl of Courtown: 1813–1831

== Lord Lieutenants ==
- Robert Carew, 1st Baron Carew, 7 October 1831 – 2 June 1856
- Robert Carew, 2nd Baron Carew, 5 July 1856 – 8 September 1881
- Lord Maurice FitzGerald, 2 November 1881 – 14 April 1901
- James Stopford, 6th Earl of Courtown, 27 July 1901 – 1922
