= Duleek (Parliament of Ireland constituency) =

Pre-1801 Irish constituency

- Former borough constituency for the Irish House of Commons
- County: County Meath
- Borough: Duleek

–1801
- Replaced by: Disfranchised

Duleek was a constituency represented in the Irish House of Commons until 1800.

== Members of Parliament ==
Election	First MP	Second MP
1661	Patrick Tallant	Gabriel Bristow
1662	Michael Jones	Gabriel Bristow
1689	Duleek was not represented in the Patriot Parliament	
1692	Sir Arthur Langford, 2nd Bt	Andrew Ram
1695	Sir Charles Feilding	Andrew Ram
1698	Sir Charles Feilding	Charles Wallis
1703	Robert Curtis	Charles Wallis
1713	Sir Thomas Smyth, 2nd Bt	William Berry
1715	Thomas Trotter (Note: Also elected for Old Leighlin in 1727, for which he chose to sit)	Francis Harrison (Note: Also elected for County Carlow in 1715, for which he chose to sit.)
1716	Thomas Trotter	Lord Frederick Howard
1727	Thomas Trotter	Stephen Ram
1728	Nathaniel Clements	Stephen Ram
1747	Nathaniel Clements	Thomas Cooley
1755	Nathaniel Clements	Henry Monck
1761	Andrew Ram	Henry Monck
1768	Richard Levinge	Stephen Ram (Note: Also elected for Gorey in 1768, for which he chose to sit)
1769	Richard Levinge	Andrew Ram
1776	Edward Stopford	Andrew Ram
1783	Abel Ram	Andrew Ram
1790	William Knott	Charles Montague Ormsby
1796	William Dalrymple	Charles Montague Ormsby
1798	Robert Rutledge	Charles Montague Ormsby
1801	Disenfranchised	

== Bibliography ==
- O'Hart, John (2007). The Irish and Anglo-Irish Landed Gentry: When Cromwell came to Ireland. Vol. II. Heritage Books. ISBN 0-7884-1927-7.
- Leigh Rayment's historical List of Members of the Irish House of Commons. Cites: Johnston-Liik, Edith Mary (2002). The History of the Irish Parliament 1692-1800 (6 volumes). Ulster Historical Foundation.
