= Peter Burrowes =

Irish barrister and politician

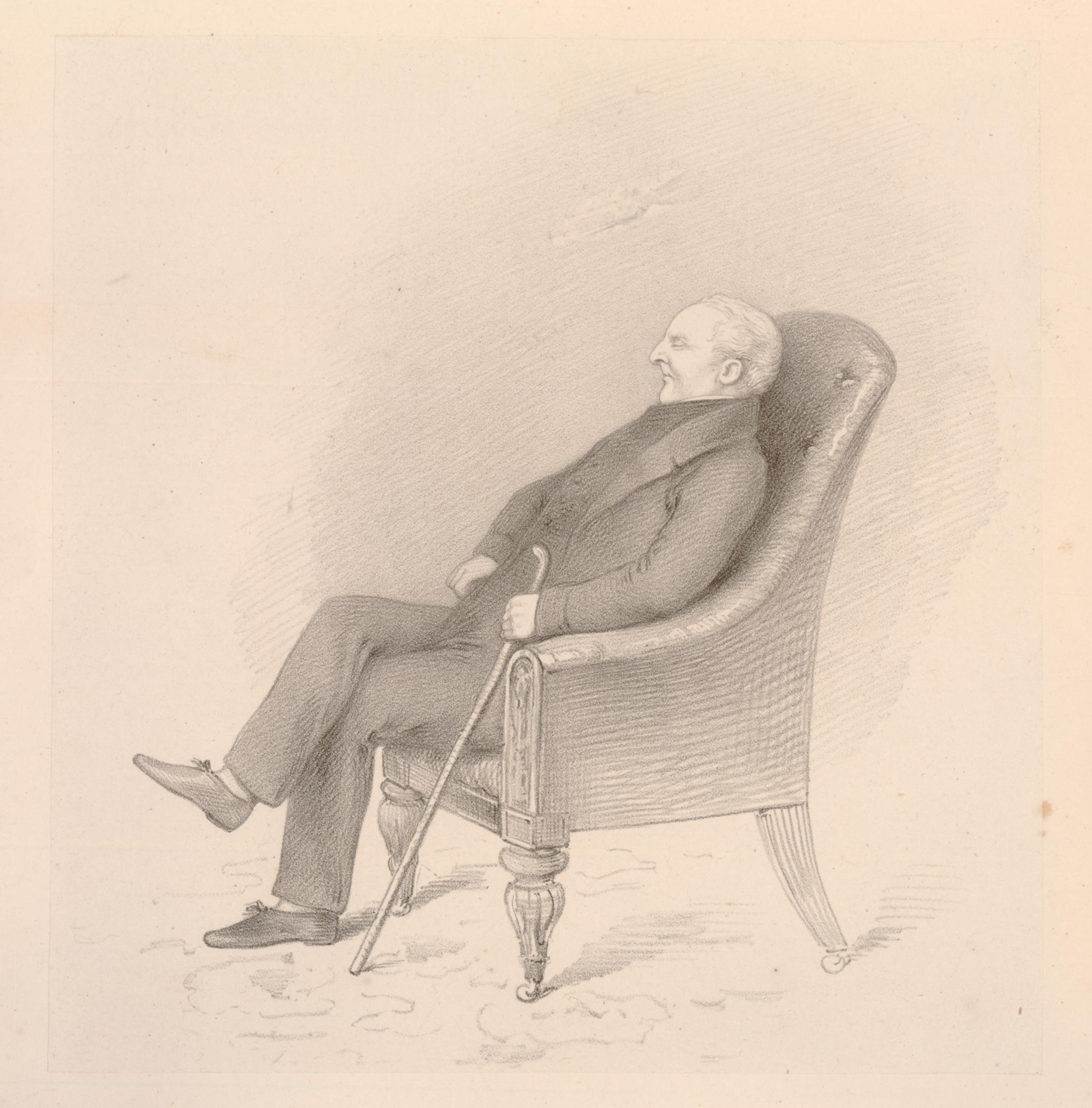
Peter Burrowes

Peter Burrowes (1753–8 November 1841) was an Irish barrister and politician.

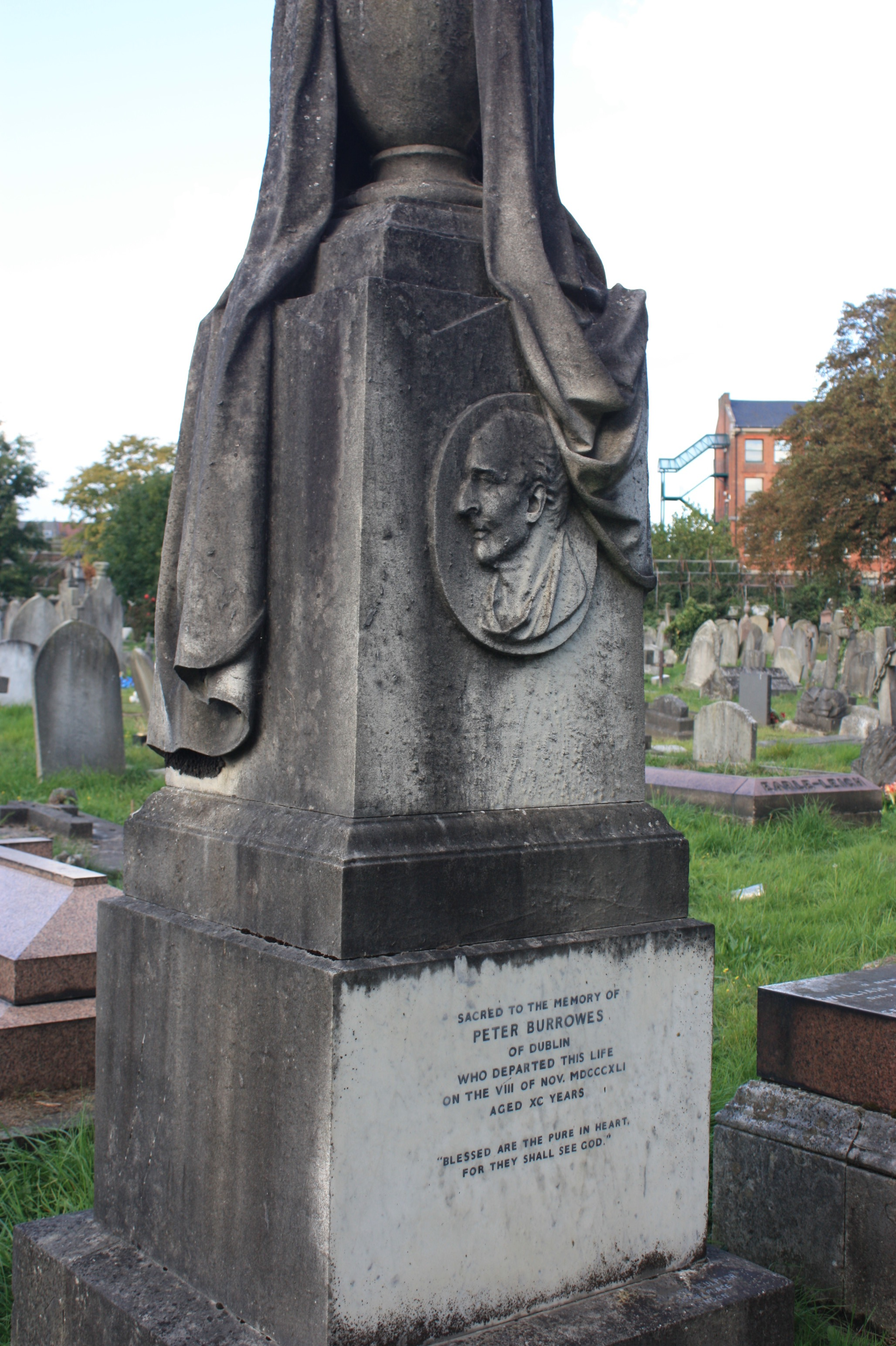
The grave of Peter Burrowes, Kensal Green Cemetery

== Life ==
He was born in Portarlington, County Laois in 1753. At Trinity College, Dublin, which he entered in 1774, he distinguished himself in the debates of the College Historical Society. While still a student at the Middle Temple, in 1784, he published a pamphlet on Catholic Emancipation, which introduced him to the notice of Flood and the other leading Irish patriots. In the following year he was called to the bar, where he rapidly acquired a good practice. In 1790, along with Wolfe Tone and others, he founded a society in Dublin for the discussion of literary and political subjects. In a duel which he fought at Kilkenny in 1794 with Somerset Butler, his life was only saved by the ball striking against some coppers which he happened to have in his waistcoat pocket.

Though he did not share in the more extreme views of the United Irishmen, he was a zealous supporter of all the most important measures of reform. Along with thirteen other king's counsel, on 9 December 1798, he protested against the proposals for a union with Great Britain, and after being elected member for Enniscorthy in February 1800 he continued, as long as the Irish parliament existed, persistently to oppose the measure. In 1803 he acted as the counsel of Robert Emmet, and in 1811 he was employed to defend the Catholic delegates. From 1821 to 1835 he was commissioner of the insolvent debtors court.

He died in London on 8 November 1841. He is buried in Kensal Green Cemetery in London to the north-east of the main chapel.
