= Caesar Colclough (1766–1842) =

Member of Parliament for County Wexford

Member of Parliament for County Wexford
- In office 27 May 1806 – 17 November 1806 Serving with Abel Ram (died 1830)
- Preceded by: Viscount Loftus and Abel Ram
- Succeeded by: John Colclough and Robert Shapland Carew

Personal details
- Born: 1766
- Died: 1842 (aged 75–76)

Caesar Colclough (1766–1842) was a Member of Parliament for County Wexford.

Parliament of the United Kingdom
Preceded by Viscount Loftus; Abel Ram	Member of Parliament for County Wexford; 27 May 1806 – 17 November 1806; With: Abel Ram	Succeeded by John Colclough; Robert Shapland Carew
