= Frederick Solly-Flood (attorney general) =

- Born: Frederick Solly; August 7, 1801; London, England
- Died: May 13, 1888 (aged 86); Gibraltar
- Resting place: Gibraltar Cemetery
- Education: Harrow School, University of Cambridge (BA 1825, MA 1828)
- Occupation: Lawyer
- Known for: Attorney General of Gibraltar (1866–1877)
- Spouse: Mary Williamson
- Children: 7, including General Sir Frederick Richard Solly-Flood
- Parents: Richard Solly; Frances Flood

Frederick Solly-Flood, QC (7 August 1801 – 13 May 1888) was a British lawyer who became Attorney General of Gibraltar.

== Life and career ==
He was born the son of fishmonger Richard Solly of London and inherited estates in County Wexford, Ireland from his maternal grandfather Sir Frederick Flood, Bt, assuming the additional name of Flood in 1818 by letters patent. He was educated briefly at Harrow School and at Cambridge University, where he was awarded BA in 1825 and MA in 1828. He entered Lincoln's Inn and was called to the bar in 1828, afterwards setting up in legal practice in London and becoming King's Council.

Financial difficulties as a result of gambling forced him to sell his legal practice and accept in 1866 the post of Attorney-General in Gibraltar. During his tenure there the sailing ship Mary Celeste arrived, bearing a three person salvage crew, who claimed the salvage prize. Solly-Flood accused the salvage crew of piracy, claiming they had killed her original crew. In the event the Judge was persuaded to limit the salvage prize to a fraction of its true value. Flood was described by a historian of the Mary Celeste affair as a man "whose arrogance and pomposity were inversely proportional to his IQ" and as "... the sort of man who, once he had made up his mind about something, couldn't be shifted." Solly-Flood held the post of attorney general until 1877.

== Death ==
He died in Gibraltar in 1888 and was buried in Gibraltar Cemetery. He had married Mary Williamson and had seven children, one of whom was General Sir Frederick Richard Solly-Flood K.C.B.
