= Robert Carew, 3rd Baron Carew =

Anglo-Irish hereditary peer

The Right Honourable The Lord Carew KP DL
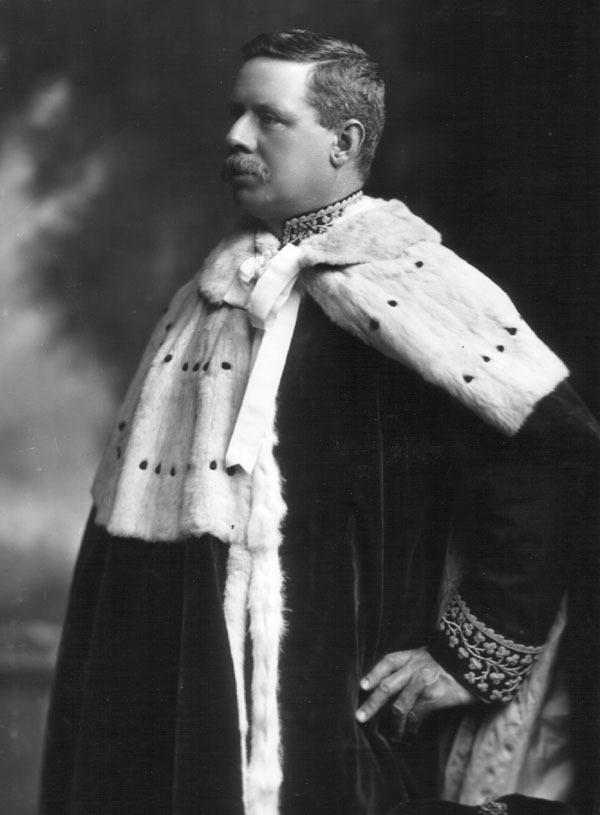
- 3rd Baron Carew, Photographed 29 May 1902.

Member of the House of Lords
- Lord Temporal
- In office 1881 – 29 April 1923
- Preceded by: The 2nd Baron Carew
- Succeeded by: The 4th Baron Carew

Personal details
- Born: Robert Shapland George Julian Carew; 15 June 1860
- Died: 29 April 1923 (aged 62)

Robert Shapland George Julian Carew, 3rd Baron Carew (15 June 1860 – 29 April 1923), was an Anglo-Irish hereditary peer.

== Early life and education ==
Carew was born in Dublin, the elder son of Robert Shapland Carew, 2nd Baron Carew, and his wife Emily Anne Philips, daughter of Sir George Philips, 2nd Baronet. He was educated at Trinity College, Cambridge.

== Later life ==
Carew inherited the baronies and a seat in the House of Lords upon the death of his father in 1881. He was Deputy Lieutenant of County Wexford, residing at the family seat, Castleboro House.

== Marriage ==
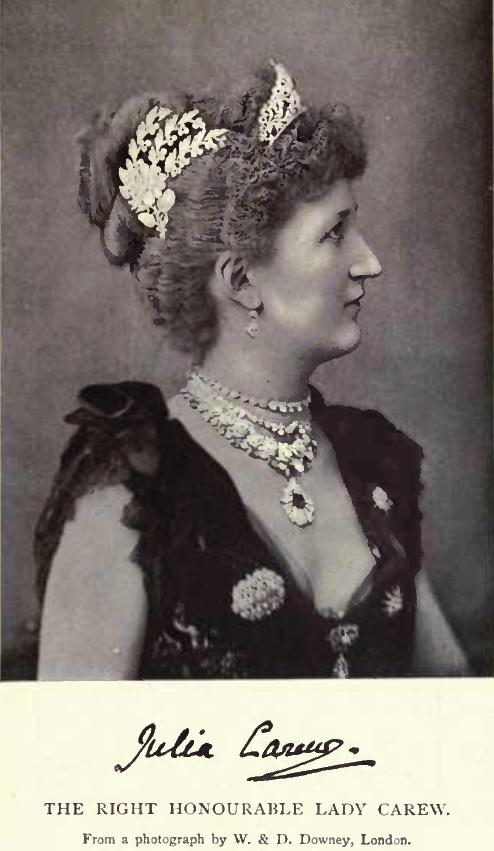
Julia, Lady Carew, by W. & D. Downey

Carew married Julia Mary Lethbridge, daughter of Albert Arthur Erin Lethbridge and Jane Hill, on 27 June 1888 at St George's, Hanover Square, London.

Julia was born in Hamilton, Ontario, on 9 October 1863. She spent several years as a child in Persia, where her great-uncle Charles Alison (1810–1872) was British minister. She was educated in England. A miniature of Julia, by C. Turrell, was exhibited at the Royal Academy of Arts, London, 1900. A portrait and sketch of her appeared in "Men and Women of the Day" (London: 1889). The Carew Spinel of the Mughal emperors bought in Persia by her relative was bequeathed to the V&A in 1922 by Lady Carew.

The couple had no children.

== Death ==
Lord Carew died in April 1923 at the age of 62. As he had no son, the baronies passed to his younger brother George.

== Notes ==
Peerage of Ireland
Preceded by Robert Carew	Baron Carew; 2nd creation 1881–1923	Succeeded by George Carew
Peerage of the United Kingdom
Preceded by Robert Carew	Baron Carew; 3rd creation 1881–1923; Member of the House of Lords (1881–1923)	Succeeded by George Carew
