= Cornelius Bolton (died 1829) =

Irish landowner and politician

Cornelius Bolton (1 October 1751 – 11 March 1829) was an Irish landowner and politician.

== Biography ==
The eldest son and heir of Cornelius Bolton, he was Member of Parliament for the city of Waterford from 1776 to 1783, High Sheriff of County Waterford in 1778 and 1815 and Mayor of Waterford in 1810 and 1816. He was also MP for Lanesborough from 1783 to 1790.

He built Faithlegg House (now a hotel) on lands at Faithlegg near Waterford city in 1783. He married Eliza MacDonnell in 1789, with whom he had 3 sons and 3 daughters.
