= Edward Stopford (British Army officer, born 1732) =

Edward Stopford (1732 – 24 October 1794) was an Anglo-Irish soldier and politician. He was the son of James Stopford, 1st Earl of Courtown. He was briefly Irish Black Rod in September 1757. He was MP for Duleek in the Irish House of Commons for one term, from 1776 to 1783. He supported the administration against the Patriot opposition and was rewarded with promotion to major general in the 3rd Regiment of Foot, and the office of constable of Limerick Castle. In 1783 he married Letitia Blacker; they had five sons and two daughters, the younger of whom married planter James Blair.
