= William Congreve Alcock =

Irish parliamentarian

Member of Parliament for Waterford City
- In office 1798–1800 Serving with Robert Shapland Carew
- Preceded by: Henry Alcock and Robert Shapland Carew
- Succeeded by: Parliament of the United Kingdom

Member of Parliament for Waterford City
- In office 1801–1803
- Preceded by: New constituency
- Succeeded by: Sir John Newport, Bt

Member of Parliament for County Wexford
- In office 1 June 1807 – 10 October 1812 Serving with Abel Ram
- Preceded by: John Colclough and Robert Shapland Carew
- Succeeded by: Robert Shapland Carew and Sir Frederick Flood, Bt

Personal details
- Born: c. 1771 Waterford, Waterford County, Ireland
- Died: September 4, 1813 (aged 41–42)
- Education: Trinity College Dublin

William Congreve Alcock (c. 1771 – 4 September 1813) was an Irish parliamentarian from Waterford.

Alcock was educated at Trinity College Dublin. He was elected at the 1798 general election as the Member of Parliament (MP) for both Waterford City and for Enniscorthy, but chose to sit for Waterford.

The Acts of Union 1800 abolished the Parliament of Ireland, and Ireland was allocated 100 seats in the House of Commons of the United Kingdom at Westminster. Waterford was one of the 31 boroughs which were selected to retain parliamentary representation, and a ballot was held to choose which of each borough's MPs should be co-opted as the initial holder of the single seat which would be allocated to them in the new parliament. Alcock was chosen by ballot as Waterford's first Westminster MP, in preference to his colleague Robert Shapland Carew.

At the general election in 1802, Alcock was re-elected for Waterford. He had beaten Sir John Newport by 471 votes to 470, but an election petition was lodged. The petition was upheld, and on 1 December 1803 Alcock was unseated and Newport declared elected.

At the general election in 1806, Alcock was elected for County Wexford, with John Colclough. At the general election in 1812, he lost to Carew and Flood.

== See also ==
- Members of the 1st UK Parliament from Ireland

Parliament of Ireland
Preceded by Robert Shapland Carew; Henry Alcock	Member of Parliament for Waterford City; 1798 – 1800; With: Robert Shapland Carew	Succeeded by Parliament of the United Kingdom
Parliament of the United Kingdom
New constituency	Member of Parliament for Waterford City; 1801 – 1803	Succeeded by Sir John Newport, Bt
Preceded by John Colclough; Robert Shapland Carew	Member of Parliament for County Wexford; 1 June 1807 – 10 October 1812; Served alongside: Abel Ram	Succeeded by Robert Shapland Carew; Sir Frederick Flood, Bt
