= Cornelius Bolton (died 1779) =

Irish landowner and politician

Cornelius Bolton (c. 1714 – 16 September 1779) was an Irish landowner and politician.

== Biography ==
He was made a freeman of the city of Waterford in 1737 and was Mayor of Waterford from 1743 to 1744 and in 1761. He represented the city in Parliament from 1768 to 1776. He was a magistrate for County Waterford from 1743 and High Sheriff of the county in 1738, 1743 and 1778.

He married Elizabeth Barker of Grantstown in 1738. His eldest son Cornelius was also active in county politics.
