= Shapland Carew =

Irish politician

Shapland Carew was an Irish politician.

Carew was born in Wexford and educated at Trinity College, Dublin.

Carew represented Waterford City from 1748 to 1761; and again from 1769 to 1776 in the Irish Parliament.
