= John Browne =

John Browne may refer to:

== Politicians ==
- John Browne (died 1570), Warden of the Mint and Member of Parliament (MP) for Aldborough
- John Browne (died ?1602), MP for Dunwich
- John Browne (MP for Morpeth), MP for Morpeth, 1601
- John Browne (Parliamentarian) (1582–1659), English politician who sat in the House of Commons at various times between 1621 and 1653
- John Browne (MP for Gloucester) (died 1638), Member of Parliament for Gloucester
- John Denis Browne (1798–1862), Member of the UK Parliament for Mayo
- John Browne (1696–1750), MP for Dorchester
- John Browne, 1st Baron Kilmaine (1726–1794), Irish politician
- John Browne, 1st Marquess of Sligo (1756–1809), Irish peer and politician
- John Browne, 1st Earl of Altamont (c. 1709–1776), Irish peer and politician
- John Browne, 3rd Baron Kilmaine (1794–1873), Anglo-Irish politician and landowner
- John Browne, 5th Baron Kilmaine (1878–1936), Anglo-Irish politician and landowner
- John Browne, 4th Marquess of Sligo (1824–1903), Irish politician and naval commander
- John T. Browne (1845–1941), mayor of Houston
- John Ferguson Browne (1920–2014), former Canadian politician, manager and traffic manager
- John Browne (Fine Gael politician) (1936–2019), Irish Fine Gael politician
- John Browne (Conservative politician) (born 1938), UK Conservative MP for Winchester, 1979–1992
- John Browne, Baron Browne of Madingley (born 1948), Baron Browne of Madingley, former Group Chief Executive of BP
- John Browne (Fianna Fáil politician) (born 1948), Irish Fianna Fáil politician

== Others ==
- John Harris Browne (1817–1904), English born explorer of Australia
- John Browne (composer) (fl. c. 1490), composer represented by several pieces in the Eton choirbook
- John C. Browne (born 1942), former director of Los Alamos National Laboratory
- John Browne (King's Gunfounder) (died 1651), first holder of the post of King's Gunfounder (in 1615)
- John Browne (academic) (died 1764), Master of University College, Oxford (1742–1762)
- John Browne (anatomist) (1642–1702), British anatomist and surgeon
- John Browne (hurler) (born 1977), former Irish hurler
- John Browne (artist) (1741–1801), British engraver and landscape artist
- John Browne (sheriff) (died 1589), Irish mapmaker and sheriff
- John Browne, 6th Baron Kilmaine (1902–1978), Anglo-Irish peer and building conservationist
- John Collis Browne (1819–1884), British Army officer
- John Henry Browne (born 1946), criminal defense attorney practicing in Seattle, Washington
- John Ross Browne (1821–1875), Irish-American writer
- John Browne (scientist) (1904–1984), English-born Canadian physician
- John Browne (chemist) (died 1735), English chemist
- John Browne (archdeacon of Limerick)
- John Browne (archdeacon of Elphin)
- John Browne (historian) (1823–1886), non-conformist historian
- Francis John Browne (1754–1833), English politician

== See also ==
- John Brown (disambiguation)
