= Des Vœux =

Des Vœux or De Voeux may refer to:

- Sir William Des Vœux (1834–1909), a British colonial governor
- Sir Henry des Voeux (1822–1894), 5th Baronet, English cricketer
- Harold Antoine Des Voeux, a scientist who worked with Samuel Squire Sprigge
- Des Voeux Road, a road in Hong Kong named after William Des Vœux
- Des Voeux Island, a member of the Queen Elizabeth Islands, Canada
- Des Voeux baronets, Des Voeux baronetcy, of Indiaville in the Queen's County, a title in the Baronetage of Ireland, created on 1 September 1787
