= Garnet Wolseley, 1st Viscount Wolseley =

British Army field marshal (1833–1913)

Field Marshal The Right Honourable The Viscount Wolseley KP GCB OM GCMG VD PC
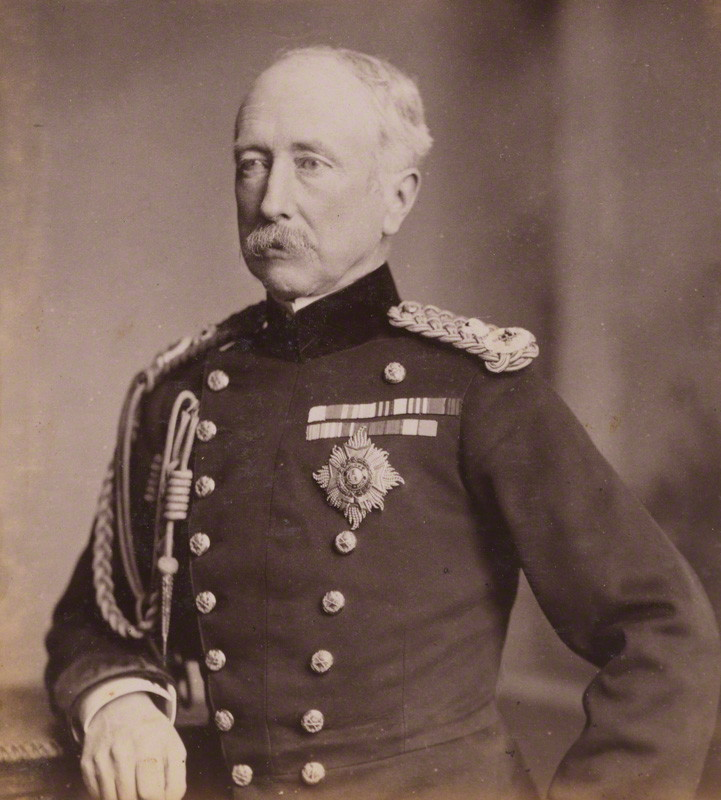
- Wolseley in 1895

8th Commander-in-Chief of the British Army
- In office 1 November 1895 – 3 January 1901
- Monarch: Victoria
- Prime Minister: Marquess of Salisbury
- Preceded by: Prince George, Duke of Cambridge
- Succeeded by: 1st Baron Roberts

Governor of Transvaal
- In office 29 September 1879 – 27 April 1880
- Preceded by: Owen Lanyon
- Succeeded by: Position abolished The Viscount Milner (1901)

Governor of the Gold Coast
- In office 2 October 1873 – 4 March 1874
- Preceded by: Robert William Harley
- Succeeded by: James Maxwell

Personal details
- Born: Garnet Joseph Wolseley; 4 June 1833 Golden Bridge House, Inchicore, Dublin, Ireland
- Died: 25 March 1913 (aged 79) London, England
- Resting place: St. Paul's Cathedral, London
- Spouse: Louisa Erskine (m. 1867)
- Children: Frances Garnet Wolseley, 2nd Viscountess Wolseley
- Awards: Knight of the Order of St Patrick; Member of the Order of Merit; Knight Grand Cross of the Order of the Bath; Knight Grand Cross of the Order of St Michael and St George; Volunteer Decoration; Mentioned in Despatches; Order of the Medjidie (Ottoman Empire); Order of Osmanieh (Ottoman Empire); Legion of Honour (France)

Military service
- Allegiance: United Kingdom; Egypt
- Branch/service: British Army
- Years of service: 1852–1900
- Rank: Field Marshal
- Commands: Commander-in-Chief of the Forces; Commander-in-Chief, Ireland; Adjutant-General to the Forces; Quartermaster-General to the Forces
- Battles/wars: Second Anglo-Burmese War; Crimean War; Siege of Sevastopol; Indian Rebellion of 1857; Siege of Lucknow; Capture of Lucknow; Second Opium War; Third Battle of Taku Forts; American Civil War (observer); Fenian raids; Red River Rebellion; Third Anglo-Ashanti War; Anglo-Zulu War; Second Sekhukhune War; 1882 Anglo-Egyptian War; Battle of Tel el-Kebir; Mahdist War; Nile Expedition; Second Boer War; Boxer Rebellion

Field Marshal Garnet Joseph Wolseley, 1st Viscount Wolseley (4 June 1833 – 25 March 1913) was an Anglo-Irish officer in the British Army. He became one of the most influential British generals after a series of victories in Canada, West Africa and Egypt, followed by a central role in modernizing the British Army in promoting efficiency.

Wolseley is considered to be one of the most prominent and decorated war heroes of the British Empire during the era of New Imperialism. He served in Burma, the Crimean War, the Indian Mutiny, China, Canada and widely throughout Africa—including his Ashanti campaign (1873–1874) and the Nile Expedition against Mahdist Sudan in 1884–85. Wolseley served as Commander-in-Chief of the Forces from 1895 to 1900. His reputation for efficiency led to the late 19th century English phrase "everything's all Sir Garnet", meaning, "All is in order."

== Early life and education ==
Lord Wolseley was born into a prominent Anglo-Irish family in Dublin, the eldest son of Major Garnet Joseph Wolseley of the King's Own Scottish Borderers (25th Foot) and Frances Anne Wolseley (née Smith). The Wolseleys were an ancient landed family in Wolseley, Staffordshire, whose roots can be traced back a thousand years. Wolseley was born at Golden Bridge House, the seat of his mother's family. His paternal grandfather was Rev. William Wolseley, Rector of Tullycorbet, and the third son of Sir Richard Wolseley, 1st Baronet, who sat in the Irish House of Commons for Carlow. The family seat was Mount Wolseley in County Carlow. He had four younger sisters and two younger brothers, Frederick Wolseley (1837–1899) and Sir George Wolseley (1839–1921).

Wolseley's father died in 1840 at age 62, leaving his widow and seven children to struggle on his Army pension. Unlike other boys in his class, Wolseley was not sent to England to attend Harrow or Eton, but was instead educated at a local school in Rathmines Dublin. There, he enjoyed military history and the Latin classics, and excelled at mathematics, history, drawing, reading, and sports. However, the family circumstance forced Wolseley to leave school at age 14, when he found work in a surveyor's office, which helped him bring in a salary and continue studying mathematics and geography. The methodical nature of the job, with its need for attention to detail, would prove to serve him well in his future army career.

== Early military career ==
Wolseley first considered a career in the church, but his financial situation meant that he would have needed a wealthy patron to support such an endeavour. Instead he sought a commission in the Army. Unable to afford Sandhurst or buying a commission, Wolseley wrote to his fellow Dubliner, Field Marshal The 1st Duke of Wellington, for assistance. Wellington, then the Commander-in-Chief of the Forces, promised to assist him when he turned 16. However, Wellington apparently overlooked him and did not respond to another letter sent when he was 17. Wolseley unsuccessfully appealed to his secretary, Lord Fitzroy Somerset. The British Army was then recovering from significant casualties in the latest war in South Africa, and Wolseley wrote to Somerset, "I shall be prepared to start at the shortest notice, should your Lordship be pleased to appoint me to a regiment now at the seat of war." His mother then wrote to the Duke to appeal his case, and on 12 March 1852, the 18-year-old Wolseley was gazetted as an ensign in the 12th Foot, in recognition of his father's service.

Just a month after he joined the 12th Foot, Wolseley transferred to the 80th Foot on 13 April 1852, with whom he served in the Second Anglo-Burmese War. He was severely wounded when he was shot in the left thigh with a jingal bullet on 19 March 1853 in the attack on Donabyu, and was mentioned in despatches. Promoted to lieutenant on 16 May 1853 and invalided home, Wolseley transferred to the 84th Regiment of Foot on 27 January 1854, and then to the 90th Light Infantry, at that time stationed in Dublin, on 24 February 1854. He was promoted to captain on 29 December 1854.

== Crimea ==
Wolseley accompanied the regiment to the Crimea, and landed at Balaklava in December 1854. He was selected to be an assistant engineer, and attached to the Royal Engineers during the Siege of Sevastopol. Wolseley served throughout the siege, where he was wounded at "the Quarries" on 7 June 1855, and again in the trenches on 30 August 1855, losing an eye.

After the fall of Sevastopol, Wolseley was employed on the quartermaster-general's staff, assisting in the embarkation of the troops and supplies, and was one of the last British soldiers to leave the Crimea in July 1856. For his services he was twice mentioned in despatches, received the war medal with clasp, the 5th class of the French Légion d'honneur and the 5th class of the Turkish Order of the Medjidie.

Six months after joining the 90th Foot at Aldershot, he went with it in March 1857 to join the troops being despatched for the Second Opium War. Wolseley was embarked in the transport Transit, which wrecked in the Strait of Banka. The troops were all saved, but with only their personal arms and minimal ammunition. They were taken to Singapore, and from there dispatched to Calcutta on account of the Indian Mutiny.

== Indian Rebellion of 1857 ==
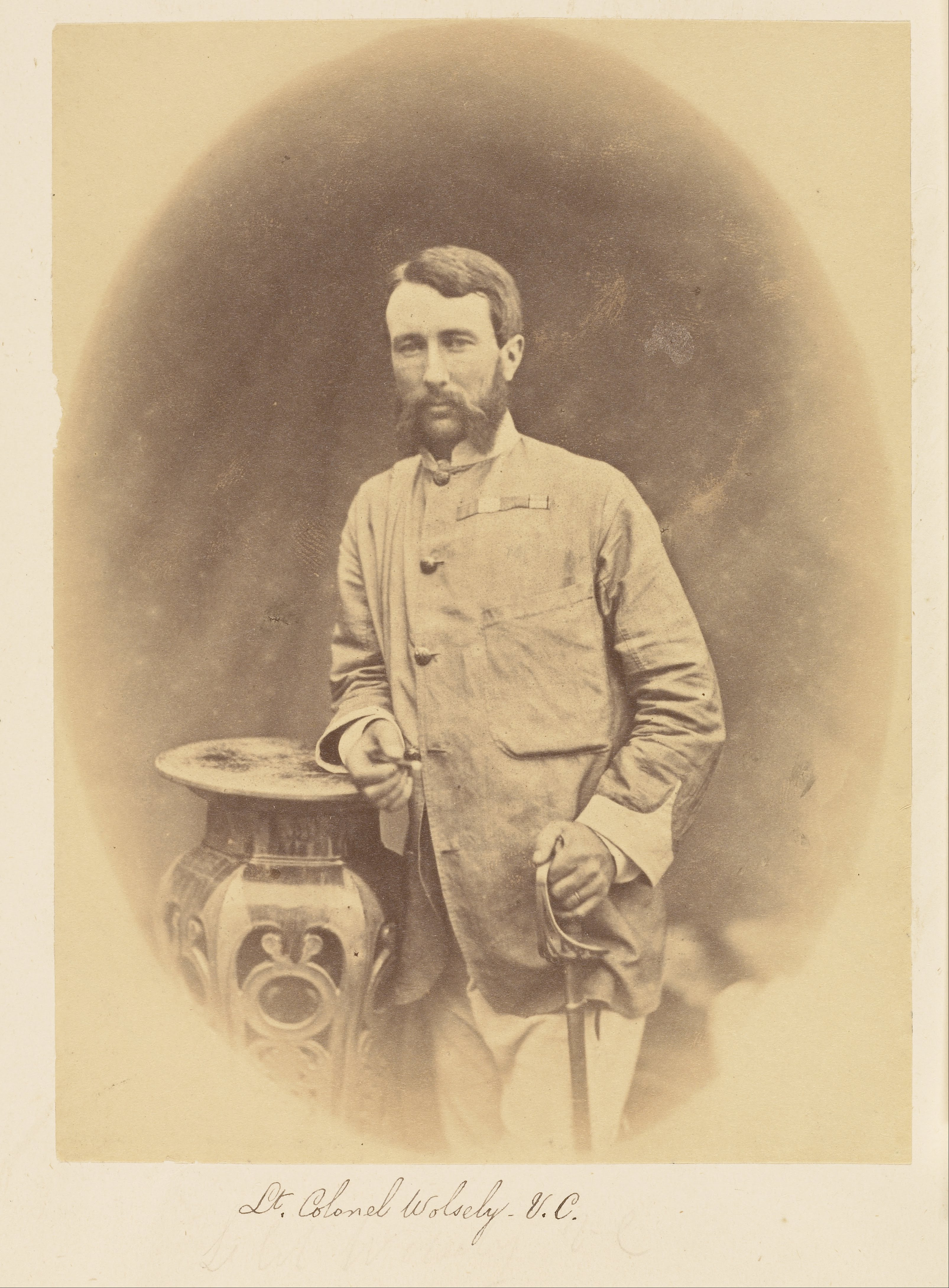
Lieutenant-Colonel Wolseley in India, by Felice Beato, 1858–1859

Wolseley distinguished himself at the relief of Lucknow under Sir Colin Campbell in November 1857, and in the defence of the Alambagh position under Outram, taking part in the actions of 22 December 1857, of 12 January 1858 and 16 January 1858, and also in the repulse of the grand attack of 21 February 1858. That March, he served at the final siege and capture of Lucknow. He was then appointed deputy-assistant quartermaster-general on the staff of Sir Hope Grant's Oudh division, and was engaged in all of the operations of the campaign, including the actions of Bari, Sarsi, Nawabganj, the capture of Faizabad, the passage of the Gumti and the action of Sultanpur. In the autumn and winter of 1858–59 he took part in the Baiswara, trans-Gogra and trans-Rapti campaigns ending with the complete suppression of the rebellion. For his services he was frequently mentioned in dispatches, and having received the Mutiny medal and clasp, he was promoted to brevet major on 24 March 1858 and to brevet lieutenant-colonel on 26 April 1859.

During the rebellion, Wolseley displayed strong views towards native peoples, referring to them as "beastly niggers", and remarking that the sepoys had "barrels and barrels of the filth which flows in these niggers' veins".

Wolseley continued to serve on Sir Hope Grant's staff in Oudh, and when Grant was nominated to the command of the British troops in the Anglo-French expedition to China of 1860, accompanied him as the deputy-assistant quartermaster-general. He was present at the action at Sin-ho, the capture of Tang-ku, the storming of the Taku Forts, the Occupation of Tientsin, the Battle of Pa-to-cheau and the entry into Peking (during which the destruction of the Chinese Imperial Old Summer Palace was begun). He assisted in the re-embarkation of the troops before the winter set in. He was Mentioned, yet again, in Dispatches, and for his services received the medal and two clasps. On his return home he published the Narrative of the War with China in 1860. He was given the substantive rank of major on 15 February 1861.

== American Civil War and Canadian service ==
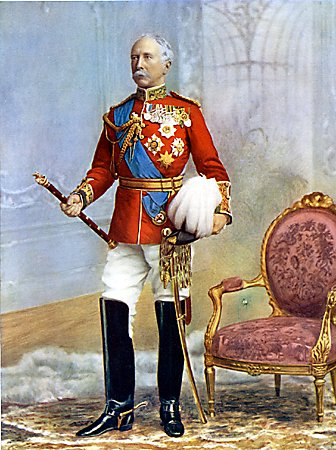
Field Marshal Viscount Wolseley

After the outbreak of the American Civil War, Wolseley was one of the special service officers sent to the Province of Canada in November 1861, in connection with the Trent incident.

In 1862, shortly after the Battle of Antietam, Wolseley took leave from his military duties and went to investigate the American Civil War. He befriended Southern sympathizers in Maryland, who found him passage into Virginia with a blockade runner across the Potomac River. There he met Generals Robert E. Lee, James Longstreet and Stonewall Jackson. He also provided an analysis of Lieutenant General Nathan Bedford Forrest. The New Orleans Picayune (10 April 1892) published Wolseley's ten-page portrayal of Forrest, which condensed much of what was written about him by biographers of the time. This work appeared in the Journal of the Southern Historical Society in the same year, and is commonly cited today. Wolseley addressed Forrest's role at the Battle of Fort Pillow near Memphis, Tennessee, in April 1864 in which black USCT troops and white officers were alleged by some to have been slaughtered after Fort Pillow had been conquered. Wolseley wrote, "I do not think that the fact that one-half of the small garrison of a place taken by assault was either killed or wounded evinced any very unusual bloodthirstiness on the part of the assailants."

Following the end of the Civil War in the United States, Wolseley returned to Canada, where he became a brevet colonel on 5 June 1865 and Assistant Quartermaster-General in Canada with effect from the same date. He was actively employed the following year in the defence of Canada from Fenian raids launched from the United States. He was appointed Deputy Quartermaster-General in Canada on 1 October 1867. In 1869 his Soldiers' Pocket Book for Field Service was published. In its pages Wolseley gave his opinion on the fitness of the officer corps of his time and other sensitive subjects. For that he was put on half-pay, according to one source.

In 1870, he led the Red River Expedition against the uprising in the North-West Territories (present-day Manitoba), establishing Canadian colonial sovereignty in the province. As part of the North-West Territories, Manitoba formally entered Canadian Confederation in 1870 when the Hudson's Bay Company transferred its control of Rupert's Land to the government of the Dominion of Canada. However, British and Canadian authorities ignored the pre-existing Council of Assiniboia and botched negotiations with its Métis replacement, the provisional government headed by Louis Riel, who sought to join Canada on their own terms.

The expedition was made difficult by challenging terrain and a lack of easily navigable routes, Canada not yet having a transcontinental railway line. Fort Garry (now Winnipeg), the capital of Manitoba, was separated from eastern Canada by the rocks and forests of the Canadian Shield region of northwestern Ontario. The easiest route to Fort Garry that did not pass through the United States was through a network of rivers and lakes extending for 970 kilometres (600 mi) from Lake Superior, rarely traversed by those who were not part of the fur trade, and where a conventional army would struggle to obtain supplies. An end to the uprising was negotiated while Wolseley's force was en route, but in recognition of his achievements in successfully leading the expedition, Wolseley was made a Knight Commander of the Order of St Michael and St George on his return home to Britain on 22 December 1870, and a Companion of the Order of the Bath on 13 March 1871.

== Cardwell reforms ==
Appointed assistant adjutant-general at the War Office in 1871, he furthered the Cardwell schemes of army reform. The reforms met strong opposition from senior military figures led by the Duke of Cambridge, Commander-in-Chief of the Forces. At their heart was the intent to expand greatly the Army's latent strength by building reserves, both through introducing legislation for 'short service', which allowed soldiers to serve the second part of their term on the reserve, and by bringing militia (i.e. non-regular) battalions into the new localised regimental structure. Resistance in the Army continued and, in a series of subsequent military posts, Wolseley fought publicly as well as inside the Army's structure to implement them, long after the legislation had passed and Cardwell had gone.

== Ashanti ==
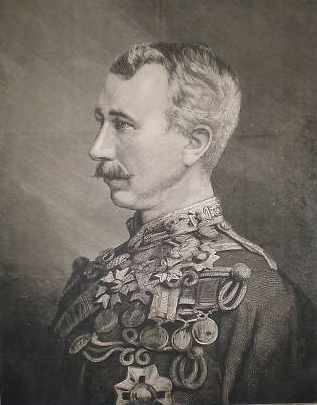
Wolseley in 1874, from the Illustrated London News

On 2 October 1873, Wolseley became Governor of Sierra Leone British West African Settlements, and the Governor of the Gold Coast. As Governor of both British Territories in West Africa he had charge over the Colonies of Gambia, Gold Coast and Western, Eastern, and Northern Nigeria, and in this role, commanded an expedition against the Ashanti Empire. Wolseley made all his arrangements at Gold Coast before the arrival of the troops in January 1874. At the Battle of Amoaful on 31 January, Wolseley's expedition defeated the numerically superior Chief Amankwatia's army in a four-hour battle, advancing through thick bush in loose squares. After five days' fighting, ending with the Battle of Ordashu, the British entered the capital Kumasi, which they burned. Wolseley completed the campaign in two months, and re-embarked his troops for home before the unhealthy season began. This campaign made him a household name in Britain. He received the thanks of both houses of Parliament and a grant of £25,000, was promoted to brevet major-general for distinguished service in the field on 1 April 1874, received the medal and clasp, and was made Knight Grand Cross of the Order of St Michael and St George on 31 March 1874, and a Knight Commander of the Order of the Bath. The freedom of the city of London was conferred upon him with a sword of honour, and he was made honorary DCL of Oxford and LL.D of Cambridge universities.

== Service at home, and in Natal, Cyprus, and South Africa ==
On his return home he was appointed inspector-general of Auxiliary Forces with effect from 1 April 1874. In his role with the Auxiliary Forces, he directed his efforts to building up adequate volunteer reserve forces. Finding himself opposed by the senior military, he wrote a strong memorandum and spoke of resigning when they tried to persuade him to withdraw it. He became a lifelong advocate of the volunteer reserves, later commenting that all military reforms since 1860 in the British Army had first been introduced by the volunteers. Shortly after, in consequence of the indigenous unrest in Natal, he was sent to that colony as governor and general-commanding on 24 February 1875.

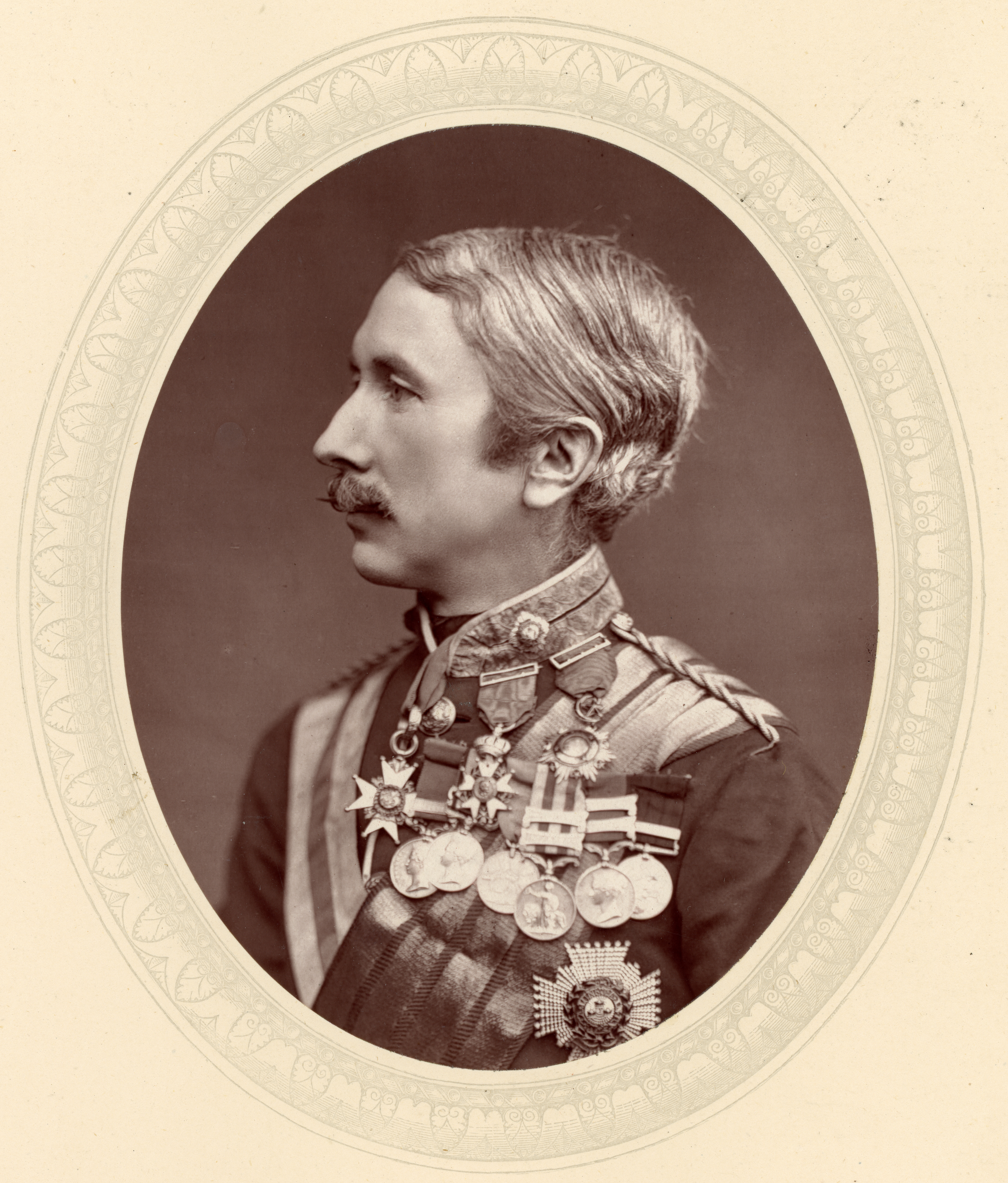
Wolseley in 1876, from Men of Mark

Wolseley accepted a seat on the Council of India in November 1876 and was promoted to the substantive rank of major-general on 1 October 1877. He was promoted to brevet lieutenant-general on 25 March 1878. On 12 July 1878, he was appointed the first High Commissioner to Cyprus, a newly acquired possession.

In the following year, he was sent to South Africa to supersede Lord Chelmsford in command of the forces in the Zulu War, and as governor of Natal and the Transvaal and the High Commissioner of Southern Africa. Wolseley with his 'Ashanti Ring' of adherents was sent to Durban. But on arrival in July, he found that the Zulu War was practically over. After effecting a temporary settlement, he went on to the Transvaal. While serving in South Africa, he was promoted to brevet general on 4 June 1879. Having reorganized the administration there and reduced King Sekhukhune of the Bapedi to submission, he returned to London in May 1880. For his services in South Africa, he was awarded the South Africa Medal with clasp, and was advanced to Knight Grand Cross of the Order of the Bath on 19 June 1880. Finally, as if to signify a meteoric rise in Imperial esteem, he was appointed Quartermaster-General to the Forces on 1 July 1880. He found that there was still great resistance to the short service system and used his growing public persona to fight for the Cardwell reforms, especially on building up reserves, including making a speech at a banquet in Mansion house in which he commented: '...how an Army raised under the long service system totally disappeared in a few months under the walls of Sevastopol.'

== Egypt, the Nile Expedition and Commander-in-Chief ==
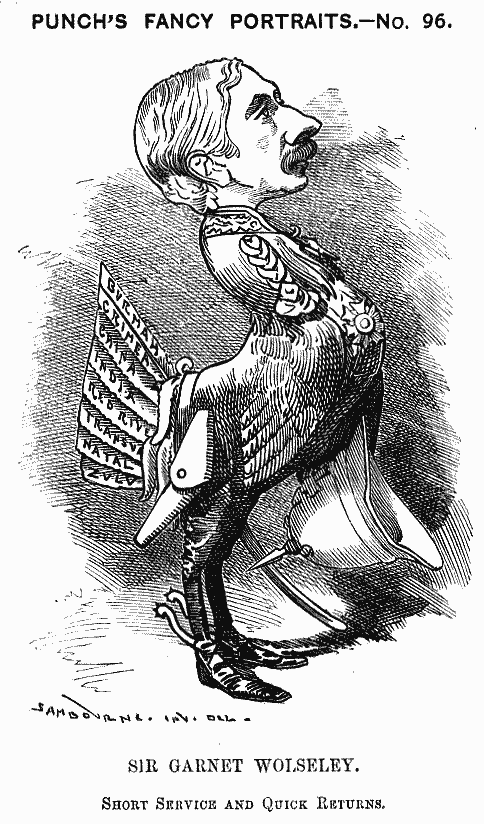
1882 caricature from Punch

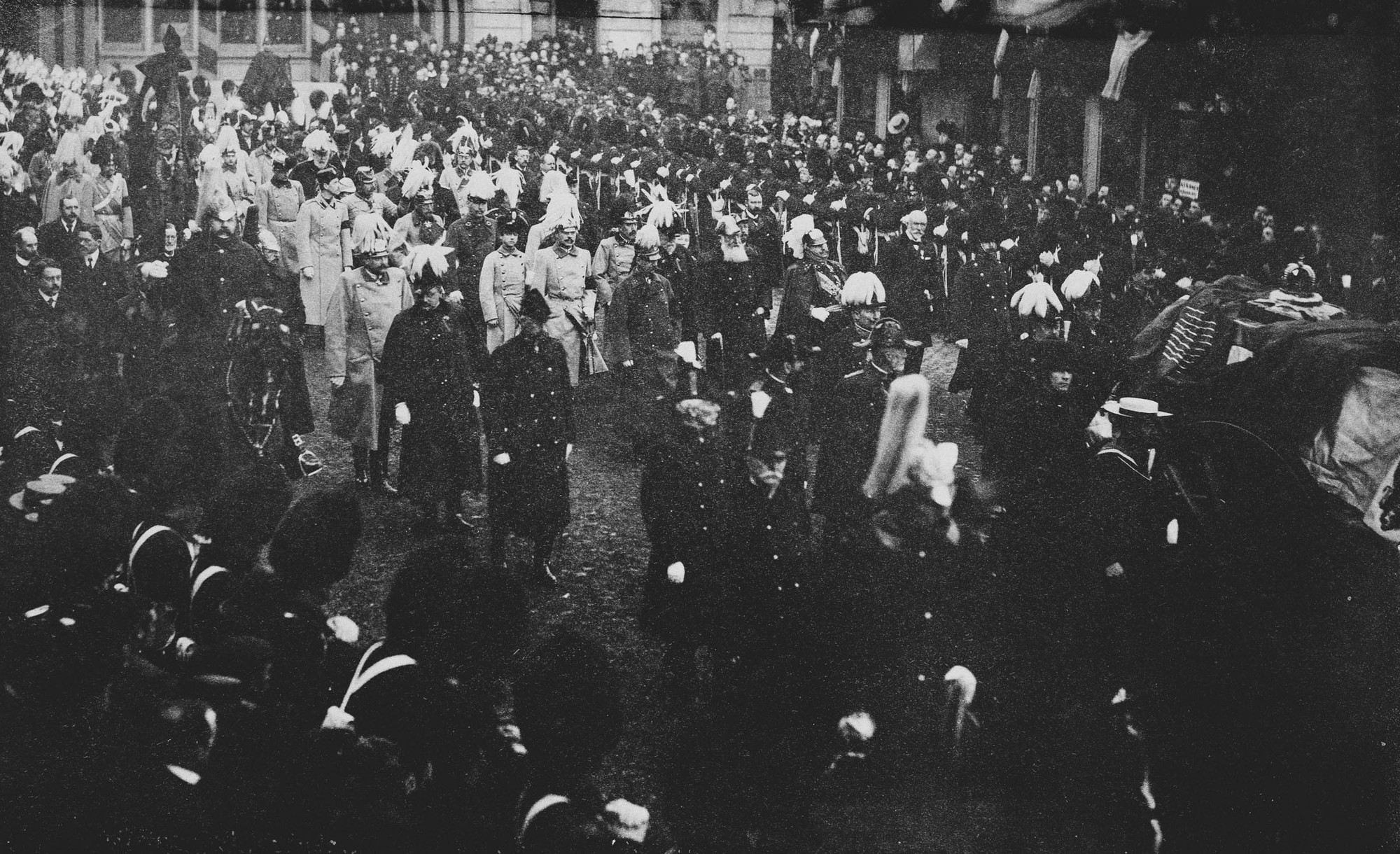
Queen Victoria's funeral procession

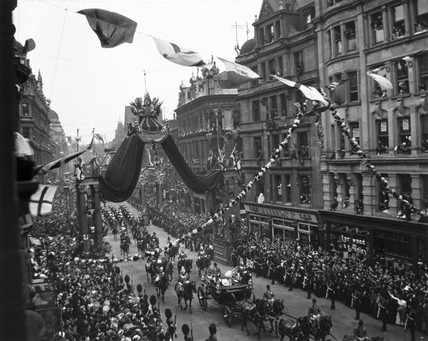
Edward VIIs coronation procession London 9 August 1902

On 1 April 1882, Wolseley was appointed Adjutant-General to the Forces, and, in August of that year, given command of the British forces in Egypt under Khedive Tewfik to suppress the Urabi Revolt. Having seized the Suez Canal, he then disembarked his troops at Ismailia and, after a very short campaign, completely defeated Urabi Pasha at the Battle of Tel el-Kebir, thereby suppressing yet another rebellion. For his services, he was promoted to the substantive rank of general on 18 November and raised to the peerage as Baron Wolseley, of Cairo and of Wolseley in the County of Stafford. He also received the thanks of Parliament and the Egypt Medal with clasp; the Order of Osmanieh, First Class, as bestowed by the Khedive; and the more dubious accolade of a composition in his honour by poetaster William Topaz McGonagall.

On 1 September 1884, Wolseley was again called away from his duties as adjutant-general, to command the Nile Expedition for the relief of General Gordon and the besieged garrison at Khartoum. Wolseley's unusual strategy was to take an expedition by boat up the Nile and then to cross the desert to Khartoum, while the naval boats went on to Khartoum. The expedition arrived too late; Khartoum had been taken, and Gordon was dead. In the spring of 1885, complications with Imperial Russia over the Panjdeh Incident occurred, and the withdrawal of that particular expedition followed. For his services there, he received two clasps to his Egyptian medal, the thanks of Parliament, and on 28 September 1885 was created Viscount Wolseley, of Wolseley in the County of Stafford, and a Knight of the Order of St Patrick. At the invitation of the Queen, the Wolseley family moved from their former home at 6 Hill Street, London to the much grander Ranger's House in Greenwich in autumn 1888.

Wolseley continued at the War Office as Adjutant-General to the Forces until 1890, when he became Commander-in-Chief, Ireland. He was promoted to be a field marshal on 26 May 1894, and appointed by the Conservative government to succeed the Duke of Cambridge as Commander-in-Chief of the Forces on 1 November 1895. This was the position to which his great experience in the field and his previous signal success at the War Office itself had fully entitled him, but it was increasingly irrelevant. Field Marshal Viscount Wolseley's powers in that office were, however, limited by a new Order in Council, and after holding the appointment for over five years, he handed over the command-in-chief to his fellow field marshal, Earl Roberts, on 3 January 1901. He had also suffered from a serious illness in 1897, from which he never fully recovered.

The unexpectedly large force required for the initial phase of the Second Boer War, was mainly furnished by means of the system of reserves Wolseley had originated. By drawing on regular reservists and volunteer reserves, Britain was able to assemble the largest army it had ever deployed abroad. Nevertheless, the new conditions at the War Office were not to his liking. The fiasco now called Black Week culminated in his dismissal over Christmastide 1900. Upon being released from responsibilities he brought the whole subject before the House of Lords in a speech.

Lord Wolseley was Gold Stick in Waiting to Queen Victoria and took part in the funeral procession following her death in February 1901. He also served as Gold Stick in Waiting to King Edward during his coronation in August 1902.

=== Honorific, royal appointments and arms ===
In early 1901, Lord Wolseley was appointed by King Edward VII to lead a special diplomatic mission to announce the King's accession to the governments of Austria-Hungary, Romania, Serbia, the Ottoman Empire and Greece. During his visit to Constantinople, Sultan Abdul Hamid II presented him with the Order of Osmanieh set in brilliants.

He was among the original recipients of the Order of Merit in the 1902 Coronation Honours list published on 26 June 1902, and received the order from King Edward VII at Buckingham Palace on 8 August 1902. For time spent as an honorary colonel in the Volunteer Force, he was given the Volunteer Officers' Decoration on 11 August 1903. He was also honorary colonel of the 23rd Middlesex Regiment from 12 May 1883, honorary colonel of the Queen's Rifle Volunteer Brigade, the Royal Scots (Lothian Regiment) from 24 April 1889, colonel of the Royal Horse Guards from 29 March 1895 and colonel-in-chief of the Royal Irish Regiment from 20 July 1898.

In retirement, he was a member of the council of the Union-Castle Steamship Company.

Coat of arms of Garnet Wolseley, 1st Viscount Wolseley
Coronet A coronet of a viscount Crest Out of a ducal coronet or, a wolf's head proper. Escutcheon Argent, a talbot passant gules, a mullet for difference. Supporters Two wolves proper, each charged on the shoulder with a laurel and palm branch in saltire or, gorged with a mural crown, also or, and holding in the paw a sword erect proper pommelled and hilted gold. Motto Homo homini lupus

== Channel Tunnel ==
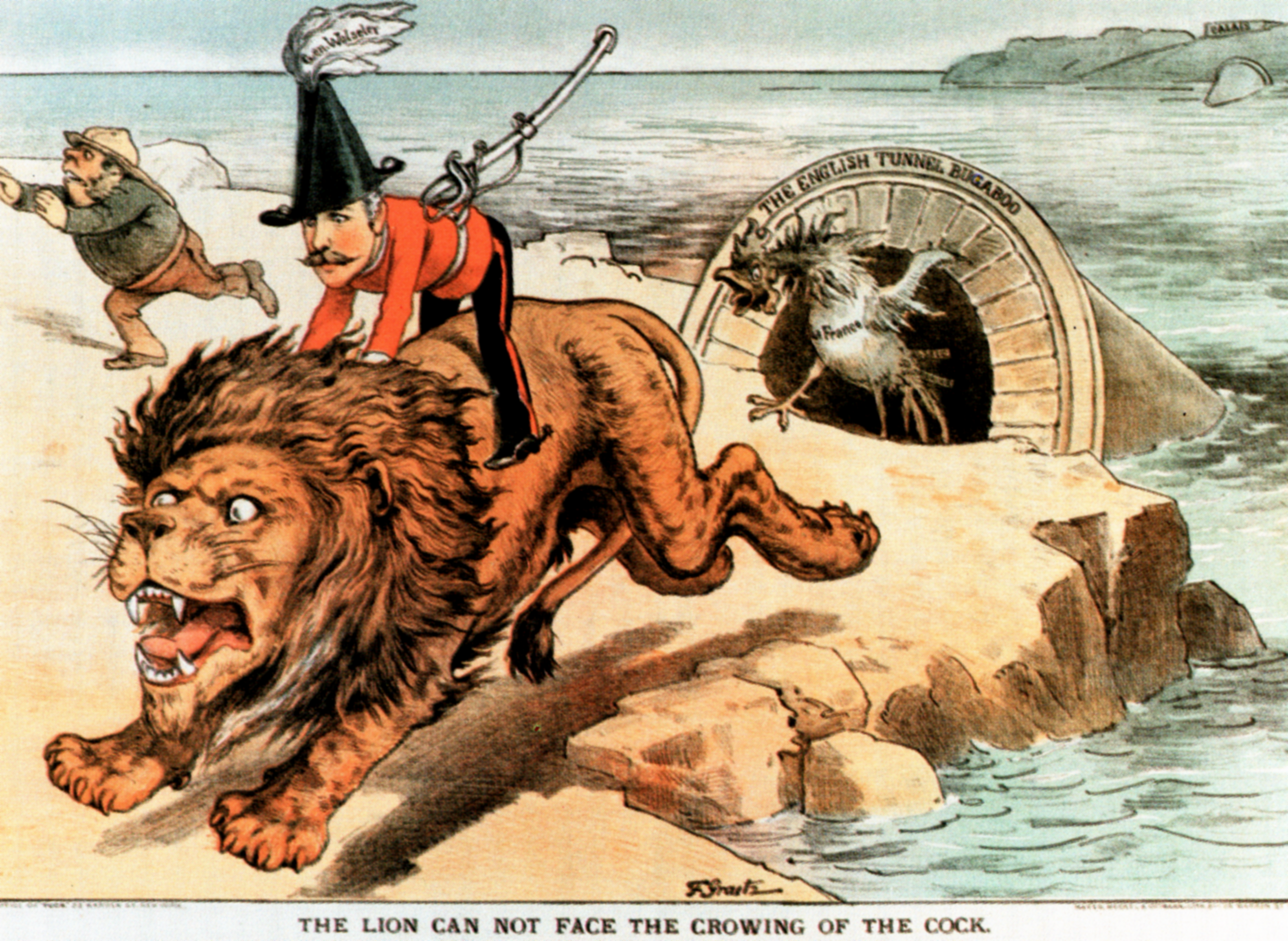
Wolseley in a political cartoon c. 1885

Wolseley was deeply opposed to Sir Edward Watkin's attempt to build a Channel Tunnel. He gave evidence to a parliamentary commission that the construction might be "calamitous for England", he added that "No matter what fortifications and defences were built, there would always be the peril of some continental army seizing the tunnel exit by surprise." Various contrivances to satisfy his objections were put forward including looping the line on a viaduct from the Cliffs of Dover and back into them, so that the connection could be bombarded at will by the Royal Navy. For a combination of reasons over 100 years were to pass before a permanent link was made.

== Personal life and death ==
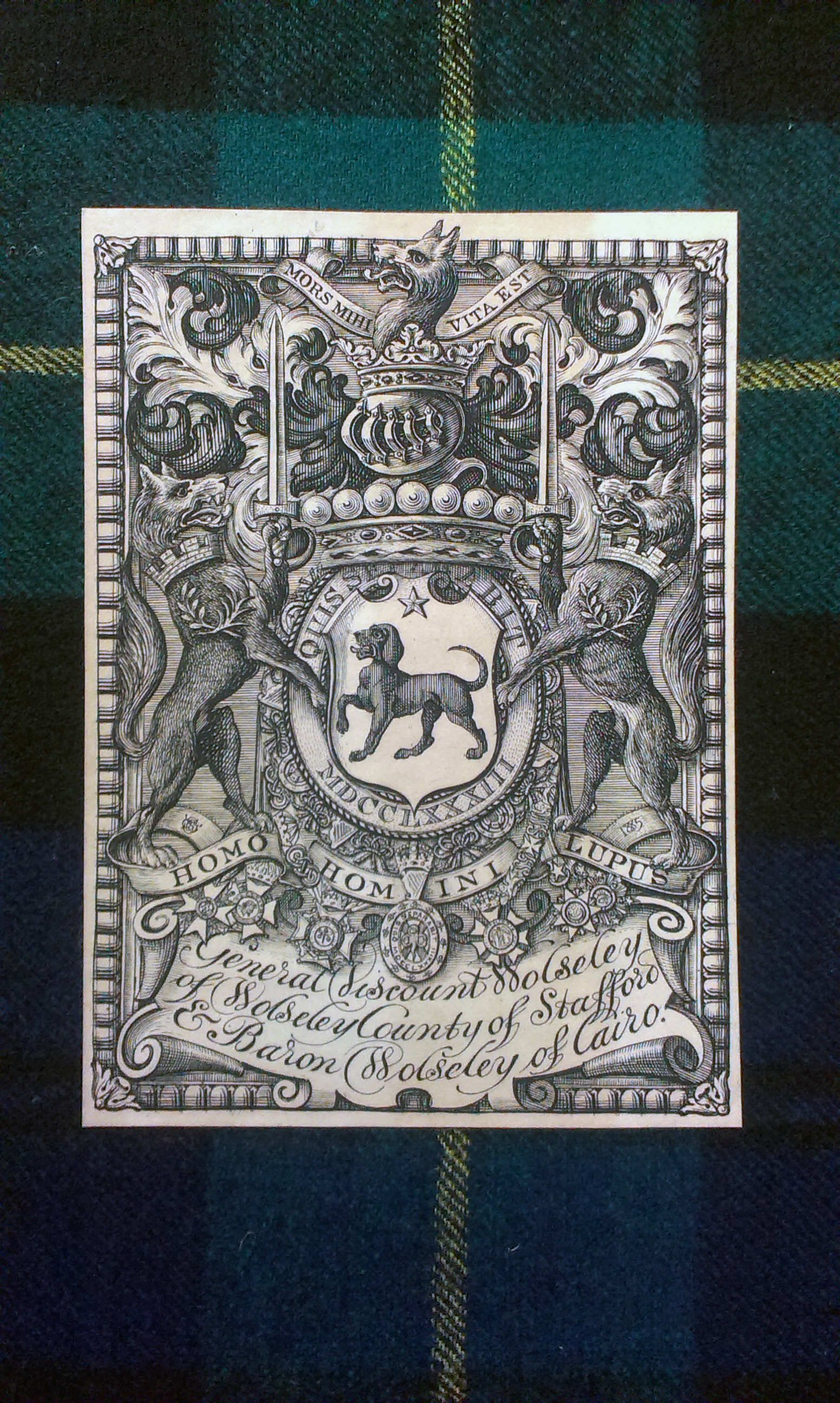
Ex libris with his coat of arms

Wolseley was married in 1867 to Louisa (1843–1920), the daughter of Mr. A. Erskine. His only child, Frances (1872–1936) was an author and founded the College for Lady Gardeners at Glynde. She was heiress to the viscountcy under special remainder, but it became extinct after her death.

In his later years, Lord and Lady Wolseley lived in a grace-and-favour apartment at Hampton Court Palace. He and his wife were wintering at Villa Tourrette, Menton on the French Riviera, where he fell ill with influenza and returned to England, where he died on 26 March 1913.

He was buried on 31 March 1913 in the crypt of St Paul's Cathedral, to music played by the band of the 2nd Battalion Royal Irish Regiment, of which he was the first Colonel-in-Chief.

== Legacy ==
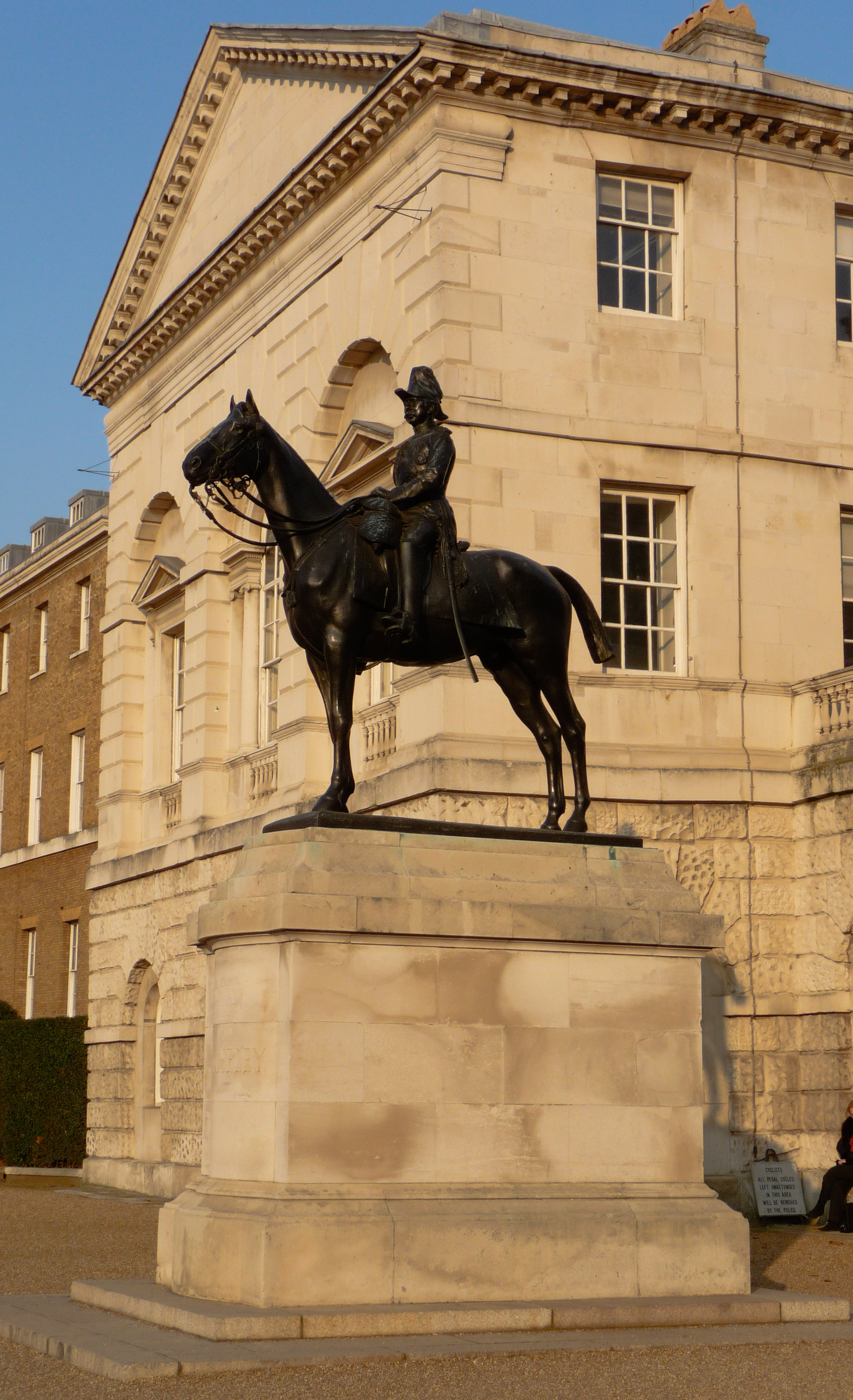
Equestrian statue of Field Marshal Lord Wolseley by Goscombe John, Horse Guards Parade (2008)

There is an equestrian statue of Wolseley in Horse Guards Parade in London. This was sculpted by Sir William Goscombe John R.A. and erected in 1920. Wolseley Barracks, at London, Ontario, is a Canadian military base (now officially known as ASU London), established in 1886. It is on the site of Wolseley Hall, the first building constructed by a Canadian Government specifically to house an element of the newly created Permanent Force. Wolseley Barracks has been continuously occupied by the Canadian Army since its creation, and has always housed some element of The Royal Canadian Regiment. At present, Wolseley Hall is occupied by the Royal Canadian Regiment Museum and the regiment's 4th Battalion, among other tenants. The white pith helmet worn as part of the full-dress uniform of the RCR and many other Canadian regiments is known as a Wolseley helmet. Wolseley is also a senior boys house at the Duke of York's Royal Military School.

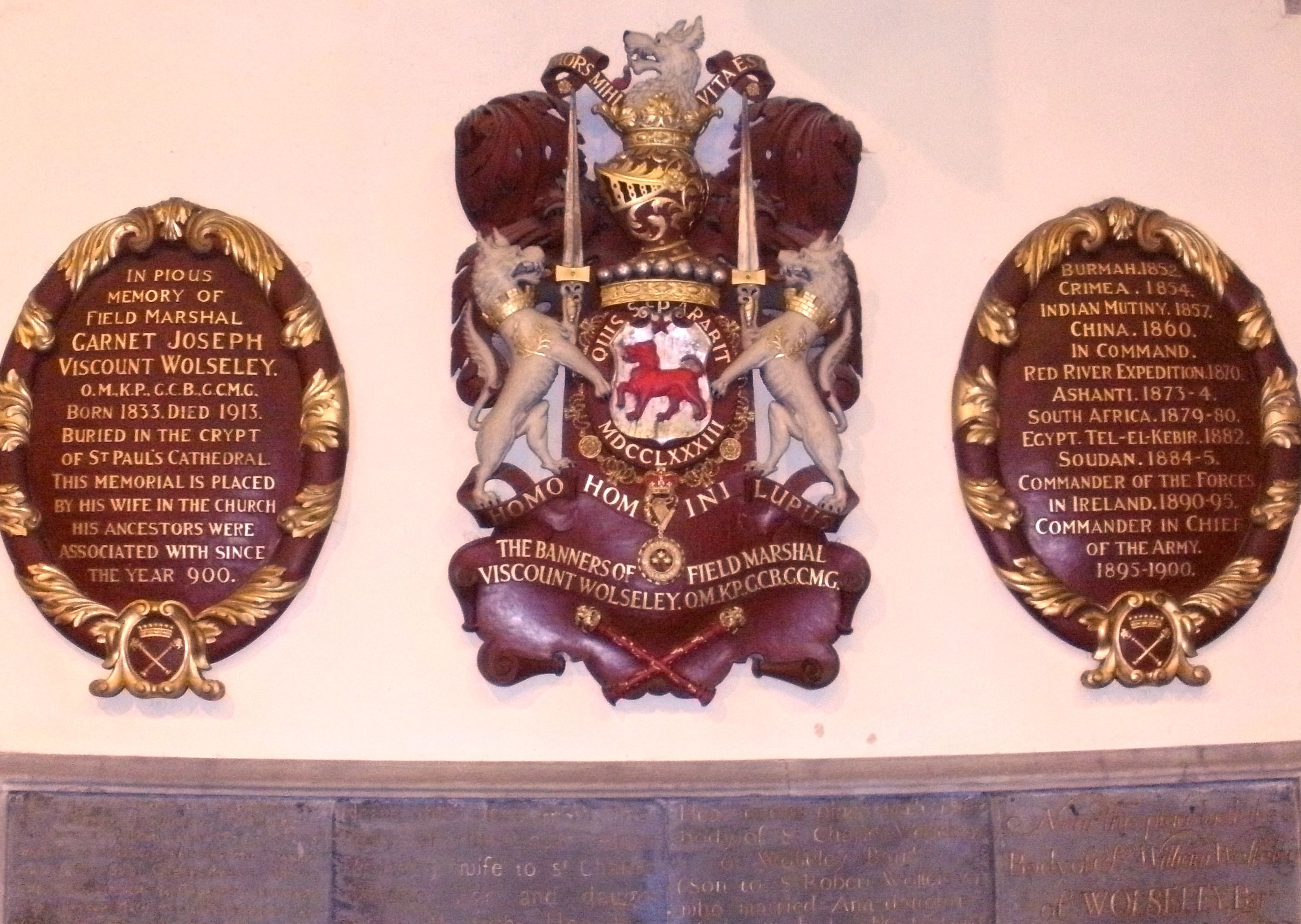
Lord Wolseley memorial at St Michael and All Angels Church in Colwich, Staffordshire

Field Marshal Lord Wolseley is commemorated by a tablet at St Michael and All Angels Church in Colwich, Staffordshire, a short distance from Shugborough Hall and Wolseley Park at Colwich, near Rugeley. The church was the burial place of the Wolseley baronets of Wolseley Park, the ancestral home of the Wolseley family.

W. S. Gilbert, of the musical partnership Gilbert and Sullivan, may have modelled the character of Major-General Stanley in the operetta The Pirates of Penzance on Wolseley, and George Grossmith, the actor who first created the role in the opening theatrical run, imitated Wolseley's appearance. In another of Gilbert and Sullivan's operettas, Patience, Colonel Calverley praises Wolseley in the phrase: "Skill of Sir Garnet in thrashing a cannibal".

The Sir Garnet pub in 1883

The residential areas of Wolseley in Winnipeg, Manitoba, Canada, located in the west central part of the city and of Wolseley, Saskatchewan, Canada, are named after him. The town of Wolseley, Western Cape, South Africa, is named after Sir Garnet Joseph Wolseley. It was established on the farm Goedgevonden in 1875 and attained municipal status in 1955; prior to this it was known as Ceres Road.

The Sir Garnet pub in the centre of Norwich, overlooking the historic market place and city hall, is named after Field Marshal Lord Wolseley. The pub opened in about 1861 and adopted the name Sir Garnet Wolseley in 1874, changed after a brief closing (2011–2012) to Sir Garnet.

Wolseley's uniforms, field marshal's baton and souvenirs from his various campaigns are held in the collections of the Glenbow Museum in Calgary, Alberta, Canada. Wolseley maintained a deep interest in notable individuals in early modern European history, and collected items related to many of them (for example, a box from Sir Francis Drake, a watch related to Oliver Cromwell, a funerary badge for Admiral Horatio Nelson and General James Wolfe's snuff box). These are also held in the collection.

In recognition of his success, an expression arose: "all Sir Garnet" meaning; that everything is in good order.

== Selected publications by Viscount Wolseley ==
- The Story of a Soldier's Life. Vol. I. New York: Charles Scribner's Sons. 1903.
- The Story of a Soldier's Life. Vol. II. New York: Charles Scribner's Sons. 1904.
- "General Lee". Macmillan's Magazine. 55 (329): 321–331. March 1887.
- Narrative of the war with China in 1860. Longman, Green. 1862.
- The soldier's pocket-book of field service. Macmillan and Co. 1874.
- The life of John Churchill, Duke of Marlborough, to the accession of Queen Anne. R. Bentley and Son. 1894.
- The decline and fall of Napoleon. Pall Mall magazine library. Roberts Bros. 1895.
- The story of a soldier's life. A. Constable & Co. 1903.
- General Lee. Press of C. Mann printing company. 1906.
- Letters of Lord and Lady Wolseley, 1870–1911, ed. by Sir George Arthur. 1922.
- American Civil War, an English view, writings of Viscount Wolseley, selected & ed. by James A. Rawley. 1964.
- Preston, Adrian W., ed. (1967). In relief of Gordon: Lord Wolseley's campaign journal of the Khartoum Relief Expedition, 1884–1885.
- Preston, Adrian W., ed. (1973). South African journal of Sir Garnet Wolseley, 1879–1880.

== See also ==
- Royal Horse Guards
- British Cavalry
- British Army
- Essex Regiment

== Bibliography ==
- Bailes, Howard (1980). "Technology and imperialism: A case study of the Victorian army in Africa". Victorian Studies. 24 (1): 83–104. JSTOR 826880.
- Baker, Margaret (2008). Discovering London Statues and Monuments. Osprey Publishing. ISBN 978-0-7478-0495-6.
- Bates, Stuart Jeffery; Suciu, Peter (2009). The Wolseley Helmet in Pictures: From Omdurman to El Alamein. PSB Publishing. ISBN 978-0-9806567-0-1.
- Black, Jeremy, ed. (2008). Great Military Leaders and Their Campaigns. Thames & Hudson. pp. 232–233. ISBN 978-0-500-25145-4.
- Bond, Brian (1961). "The Retirement of the Duke of Cambridge". Journal of the Royal United Services Institute for Defence Studies. 106 (62): 544–553. doi:10.1080/03071846109420729.
- Bradley, Ian C. (2005). The Complete Annotated Gilbert & Sullivan. Oxford University Press. ISBN 978-0-19-816710-5.
- Cokayne, George Edward (1898). Complete Peerage of England, Scotland, Ireland, Great Britain and the United Kingdom, Extant, Extinct, Or Dormant. G. Bell & sons. p. 195.
- Ensor, R. C. K. (1936). England 1870–1914.
- Farmer, John Stephen; Henley, W.E. (1903). Slang and Its Analogues Past and Present: A Dictionary ... with Synonyms in English, French ... Etc. Harrison & Sons.
- Geoghegan, Brigadier-General Stannus (1911). The Campaigns and History of the Royal Irish Regiment (updated 1927 ed.). Edinburgh and London: Blackwood.
- Hamer, William Spencer. The British Army; civil-military relations, 1885–1905 (1970).
- Gregory, Barry (2006). The History of the Artists Rifles 1859–1947. Pen and Sword. ISBN 978-1-84415-503-3.
- Heathcote, Tony (1999). The British Field Marshals 1736–1997. Pen & Sword Books Ltd. ISBN 0-85052-696-5.
- Holt, Edgar. "Garnet Wolseley: Soldier of Empire" History Today (Oct 1958) 8#10 pp 706–713.
- James, Henry (2012). The Master, the Modern Major General, and His Clever Wife: Henry James's Letters to Field Marshal Lord Wolseley and Lady Wolseley, 1878–1913. University of Virginia Press. ISBN 978-0-8139-3235-4.
- Kochanski, H.M. (1997). "Field Marshal Viscount Wolseley as commander-in-chief, 1895–1900: A reassessment". Journal of Strategic Studies. 20 (2): 119–139. doi:10.1080/01402399708437681. ISSN 0140-2390.
- Kochanski, Halik (1999). Sir Garnet Wolseley: Victorian Hero. London: Hambledon Press. ISBN 1-85285-188-0.
- Lehmann, Joseph H. (1964). All Sir Garnet; a life of Field-Marshal Lord Wolseley. London: J. Cape. ASIN B0014BQSRS.
- Maxwell, Leigh (1985). The Ashanti Ring: Sir Garnet Wolseley's Campaigns 1870-1882. Leo Cooper & Martin Secker. ISBN 978-0-436-27447-3.
- McElwee, W.L. (1974). The art of war: Waterloo to Mons. London: Weidenfeld and Nicolson. ISBN 0-297-76865-4.
- Partridge, Eric (2006). A Dictionary of Slang and Unconventional English. Routledge. ISBN 978-1-134-96365-2.
- Raper, P. E. (1989). Dictionary of Southern African Place Names. J. Ball. ISBN 978-0-947464-04-2.
- Spiers, Edward M. (1992). The Late Victorian Army, 1868–1902. Manchester History of the British Army.
- Tabor, Paddy (2010). The Household Cavalry Museum. Ajanta Book Publishing. ISBN 978-1-84820-882-7.
- Wessels, Andre (2003). "The British Army in 1899: problems that hampered preparations for war in South Africa". Journal for Contemporary History. 28 (2). University of the Free State. hdl:10520/EJC28277. ISSN 0258-2422.
- White-Spunner, Barney (2008). Horse Guards. Macmillan. ISBN 978-1-4050-5574-1.
- Wright, William (2017). A British Lion in Zululand: Sir Garnet Wolseley in South Africa. Amberley. ISBN 978-1-445-66548-1.

Government offices
Preceded by Robert William Harley	Governor of the Gold Coast; 1873–1874	Succeeded by James Maxwell
Preceded by Sir Benjamin Pine	Governor of Natal; 1875	Succeeded by Sir Henry Bulwer
Military offices
Preceded by Sir Daniel Lysons	Quartermaster-General to the Forces; 1880–1882	Succeeded by Sir Arthur Herbert
Preceded by Sir Charles Ellice	Adjutant-General to the Forces; 1882–1890	Succeeded by Sir Redvers Buller
Preceded by Prince Edward of Saxe-Weimar	Commander-in-Chief, Ireland; 1890–1895	Succeeded by The Lord Roberts of Kandahar
Preceded by Sir Patrick Grant	Colonel of the Royal Horse Guards; 1895–1907	Succeeded by Sir Evelyn Wood
Preceded by The Duke of Cambridge	Commander-in-Chief of the Forces; 1895–1900	Succeeded by The Lord Roberts of Kandahar
Peerage of the United Kingdom
New creation	Viscount Wolseley; 1885–1913	Succeeded by Frances Garnet Wolseley
