= Baron Kilmaine =

Title in the Peerage of Ireland

Barony of Kilmaine
- Arms of Browne, Baron Kilmaine:Sable, three lions passant in bend argent between four bendlets argent; Crest: An eagle displayed vert; Supporters: Two lions regardant argent ducally crowned plain collared and chained or
- Creation date: 21 September 1789
- Creation: Second
- Created by: King George III
- Peerage: Peerage of Ireland
- First holder: Sir John Browne, 7th Baronet
- Present holder: John Browne, 8th Baron Kilmaine
- Heir presumptive: Mark Caulfield-Browne
- Remainder to: Heirs male of the first baron's body lawfully begotten
- Status: Extant
- Former seat: Westport House
- Motto: SUIVEZ RAISON ("Follow the right")

Baron Kilmaine is a title that has been created twice, both times in the Peerage of Ireland. The first creation came in 1722 in favour of the soldier the Hon. James O'Hara. The name refers to Kilmaine, County Mayo, Ireland. Two years later he succeeded his father as Baron Tyrawley. However, both titles became extinct on the second Baron Tyrawley's death in 1773 without legitimate sons.

The second creation came in 1789 when Sir John Browne, 7th Baronet, of The Neale, was created Baron Kilmaine, of The Neale in the County of Mayo. He had previously represented Newtownards and Carlow in the Irish House of Commons. His grandson, the third Baron, sat in the House of Lords as an Irish representative peer from 1849 to 1873. He was succeeded by his eldest son, the fourth Baron. He was an Irish Representative Peer from 1890 to 1907, when he killed himself by jumping out of the window of a hotel in Paris. His son, the fifth Baron, sat as an Irish Representative Peer from 1911 to 1946, when he also died by suicide by drinking poison.

The seventh Baron lived in the West Midlands, was a founder of Whale Tankers Ltd, of Ravenshaw, Solihull. His widow, Linda (Lady Kilmaine), is a former High Sheriff of Warwickshire.As of 2013 the titles are held by the latter's only son, John, the eighth Baron, who succeeded his father in 2013. He lives in a Camphill community in South Wales. The seventh Baron served as a Trustee of his son's care home and left a legacy in his will to commission to a state of the art accommodation block to house five individuals with learning disabilities.

The Browne baronetcy, of The Neale in the County of Mayo, was created in the Baronetage of Nova Scotia in 1636 for John Browne. However, he never assumed the title. The baronetcy was actually only assumed for the first time by his great-great-grandson, the sixth Baronet. The latter was succeeded by his younger brother, the seventh Baronet, who was created Baron Kilmaine in 1789.

Two other members of the Browne family have been elevated to the peerage. John Browne, 1st Earl of Altamont (the grandfather of John Browne, 1st Marquess of Sligo), was the grandson of Colonel John Browne, younger son of Sir John Browne, 1st Baronet. Consequently, the present Marquess of Sligo is also in remainder to the Browne baronetcy, of The Neale. Furthermore, Augusta Browne, youngest daughter of the Very Reverend the Hon. Henry Montague Browne, second son of the second Baron Kilmaine, was created Baroness Bolsover in 1880.

This Browne family of Ireland bears the arms Sable, three lions passant in bend argent between four bendlets argent which are the same arms as borne by the English family of Browne, Viscount Montagu, descended from Sir Anthony Browne (c.1500-1548), KG, of Battle Abbey and Cowdray Park, Master of the Horse to King Henry VIII. However no familial connection between the two families is mentioned in The Complete Peerage (1910).

As of July 2018, the holder of the barony had not successfully proven his succession to the baronetcy and was therefore not on the Official Roll of the Baronetage, with the baronetcy considered vacant. However, at least as of July 2013, the family remained in possession of Shelfield House, Warwickshire.

== Barons Kilmaine, first creation (1722) ==
- see the Baron Tyrawley

== Browne baronets, of The Neale (1636) ==
- Sir John Browne, 1st Baronet (died 1670)
- Sir George Browne, 2nd Baronet (died 1698)
- Sir John Browne, 3rd Baronet (died 1711)
- Sir George Browne, 4th Baronet (died 1737), MP for Castlebar
- Sir John Browne, 5th Baronet (died 1762)
- Sir George Browne, 6th Baronet (1725–1765)
- Sir John Browne, 7th Baronet (1730–1794) (created Baron Kilmaine in 1789)

=== Barons Kilmaine, second creation (1789) ===
- John Browne, 1st Baron Kilmaine (1730–1794)
- James Caulfeild Browne, 2nd Baron Kilmaine (1765–1825)
- John Cavendish Browne, 3rd Baron Kilmaine (1794–1873)
- Francis William Browne, 4th Baron Kilmaine (1843–1907)
- John Edward Deane Browne, 5th Baron Kilmaine (1878–1946)
- John Francis Archibald Browne, 6th Baron Kilmaine (1902–1978)
- John David Henry Browne, 7th Baron Kilmaine (1948–2013)
- John Francis Sandford Browne, 8th Baron Kilmaine (born 1983)

The heir presumptive is Dr. Mark Caulfield-Browne (born 1966), the present peer's sixth cousin twice removed and a four-times-great-grandson of the Hon. George Browne, youngest son of the first Baron (see succession chart below).

Line of succession (simplified, succession to barony only)
- John Browne, 1st Baron Kilmaine (1730–1794)
  - James Browne, 2nd Baron Kilmaine (1765–1825)
    - John Browne, 3rd Baron Kilmaine (1794–1873)
      - Francis Browne, 4th Baron Kilmaine (1843–1907)
        - John Browne, 5th Baron Kilmaine (1878–1946)
          - John Browne, 6th Baron Kilmaine (1902–1978)
            - John Browne, 7th Baron Kilmaine (1948–2013)
              - John Browne, 8th Baron Kilmaine (born 1983)
  - Hon. George Browne (1774–1804)
    - Rev. James Caulfeild Browne (1804–1870)
      - Rev. William James Caulfield Browne (1825–1893)
        - Aubrey Caulfeild Browne (1860–1953)
          - Edward James Caulfield Browne (1903–1984)
            - Reginald Malcolm Caulfield-Browne (1928–1998)
              - (1) Dr. Mark Caulfield-Browne (born 1966)
            - (2) Nigel George Caulfeild Browne (born 1947)
              - (3) Matthew John Caulfeild Browne (born 1987)
            - Robin James Caulfeild Browne (1949–2021)
              - (4) Edward Patrick Caulfeild-Browne (born 1972)
              - Christopher Robert Caulfeild-Browne (born 1974)
              - Jason Robin Caulfeild-Browne (born 1987)

The simplified chart above lists those individuals in the line of succession who are nearest in consanguinity to the present peer.

== See also ==
- Charles Edward Jennings, referred to himself as Baron de Kilmaine
- Marquess of Sligo
- Baroness Bolsover
- Browne baronets of Palmerston
