= James Browne, 2nd Baron Kilmaine =

Irish politician and landowner

The Right Honourable The Lord Kilmaine

Member of Parliament for Carlow
- In office 1790–1790 Serving with Charles des Voeux
- Preceded by: Charles des Voeux; Sir John Browne, Bt
- Succeeded by: Augustus Cavendish-Bradshaw; John Ormsby Vandeleur

Personal details
- Born: James Caulfeild Browne; 16 March 1765
- Died: 23 May 1825 (aged 60)
- Spouse: Hon. Alice Caulfeild (m. 1793; died 1825)
- Children: 7
- Parent(s): John Browne, 1st Baron Kilmaine; Hon. Alicia Caulfeild

James Caulfeild Browne, 2nd Baron Kilmaine (16 March 1765 – 23 May 1825) was an Anglo-Irish Member of Parliament and landowner. He sat in the House of Commons of Ireland in 1790.

== Early life ==
Kilmaine was the eldest son of John Browne, 1st Baron Kilmaine, and his wife, Hon. Alicia Caulfeild.

His paternal grandparents were the former Margaret Dodwell and Sir John Browne, the de jure 5th Baronet, of The Neale, but never assumed the title. His uncle, Sir George Browne, 6th Baronet, assumed the title and his father, in 1765, succeeded him as seventh Baronet. His maternal grandparents were James Caulfeild, 3rd Viscount Charlemont and Elizabeth Bernard (a daughter of Francis Bernard, MP and judge of the Court of Common Pleas).

== Career ==
He was an MP for Carlow from January 1790 to May 1790.

Upon the death of his father on 7 June 1794, he succeeded as the 8th Baronet Browne, of the Neale, and 2nd Baron Kilmaine, of the Neale, County Mayo.

== Personal life ==
On 25 July 1793, Browne was married to Hon. Anne Cavendish, daughter of Sir Henry Cavendish, 2nd Baronet and Sarah Cavendish, 1st Baroness Waterpark. He resided at Gaulstown House. Together, they were the parents of:

- John Cavendish Browne, 3rd Baron Kilmaine (1794–1873), who married Elizabeth Lyon, daughter of David Lyon, in 1822. After her death in 1834, he married Mary Law, daughter of Hon. Charles Ewan Law, in 1839.
- Hon. Henry Montague Browne (1799–1884), the Dean of Lismore who married Catherine Penelope de Montmorency, daughter of Lodge Evans de Montmorency, 1st Viscount Frankfort de Montmorency, in 1822.
- Hon. George Augustus Browne (1801–1878), who married Anne Hammond Morgan, daughter of Sir Thomas Charles Morgan (physician to the 1st Marquess of Abercorn) and stepdaughter of author Sydney, Lady Morgan, in 1845. After her death in 1850, he married Frances Mary Prideaux-Brune, daughter of Rev. Charles Prideaux-Brune of Prideaux Place, in 1853.
- Hon. Augustus Caulfeild James Browne (1803–1831), a Captain in the Army who accidentally drowned.
- Hon. Sarah Louisa Browne (c. 1805–1881), who married Lt.-Col. George Disbrowe in 1825.
- Hon. Richard Howe Browne (1811–1888), who married his cousin, Elizabeth Browne, daughter of Col. Hon. John Browne and Anne White, in 1833. After her death, he married Elise Watkin, a daughter of Col. H. S. Watkin, in 1880.
- Hon. Frederick Longworth Browne (1811–1864), who died unmarried.

Lord Kilmaine died on 23 May 1825. He was succeeded by his eldest son, John. Lady Kilmaine died on 6 July 1863.

=== Descendants ===
Through his son Henry, he was a grandfather to Augusta Browne, who married Arthur Cavendish-Bentinck (younger son of Lord Charles Bentinck, third son of William Cavendish-Bentinck, 3rd Duke of Portland) and became the first Baroness Bolsover. She was the mother of Lady Ottoline Morrell and stepmother to William Cavendish-Bentinck, 6th Duke of Portland.

Parliament of Ireland
Preceded by Charles des Voeux; Sir John Browne, Bt	Member of Parliament for Carlow; January 1790 – May 1790; With: Charles des Voeux	Succeeded by Augustus Cavendish-Bradshaw; John Ormsby Vandeleur
Peerage of Ireland
Preceded by John Browne	Baron Kilmaine; 1794 – 1825	Succeeded by John Browne
