= John Browne, 7th Baron Kilmaine =

Anglo-Irish hereditary peer and businessman

John David Henry Browne, 7th Baron Kilmaine (2 April 1948 – 12 January 2013) was an Anglo-Irish hereditary peer and businessman.

Browne was the son of John Francis Archibald Browne, 6th Baron Kilmaine and his wife Whilhelmina Phyllis Arnott. He was educated at Eton College and was the director of Fusion (Bickenhill) Ltd between 1964 and 1996 and later the director of Whale Tankers Ltd (1974 and 2001).

His widow, Linda, Lady Kilmaine, is a former High Sheriff of Warwickshire.

For five years he served as a Trustee of Glasallt Fawr Camphill Centre near Landovery in Wales. In his will he left a legacy to allow for the construction of a state-of-the-art accommodation block to house five individuals with learning disabilities at the site. His son and successor (the 8th Baron) also resides at a Camphill community in South Wales.

Following his death on 12 January 2013, his son John Francis Sandford Browne, 8th Baron Kilmaine succeeded him.

Peerage of Ireland
Preceded by John Browne, 6th Baron Kilmaine	Baron Kilmaine; 1978 – 2013	Succeeded by John Francis Sandford Browne, 8th Baron Kilmaine
