= John Browne, 6th Baron Kilmaine =

Anglo-Irish hereditary peer and building conservationist

John Browne, 6th Baron Kilmaine CBE
- Born: 22 September 1902
- Died: 26 July 1978 (aged 75)
- Education: Magdalen College, Oxford
- Father: John Browne
- Military career
- Rank: Lieutenant-Colonel
- Wars: World War II

John Francis Archibald Browne, 6th Baron Kilmaine, CBE (22 September 1902 – 26 July 1978) was an Anglo-Irish hereditary peer and building conservationist.

== Biography ==
Browne was the son of John Browne and Lady Aline Kennedy, the daughter of the Marquess of Ailsa. Browne's family spent the early part of his life living in Gaulston, Mayo before moving to Kent when he was in his twenties. He was educated at Winchester and Magdalen College, Oxford. At Winchester he was awarded the English Speech Prize and excelled at shooting, eventually representing Ireland in the sport. After working for the British Xylonite Company from 1925 to 1929 he was Secretary to University College, Southampton until 1933. In 1933, he became a founder member of the Oxford Society and acted as Secretary until 1940. For the duration of the Second World War he served in the Royal Army Service Corps attaining the rank of Lieutenant-Colonel and was twice mentioned in despatches. In 1946, Browne succeeded as the 6th Lord Kilmaine, succeeding his father and grandfather, who both died by suicide.

In 1945, Browne became Secretary of the Pilgrim Trust. During his tenure as secretary, the Pilgrim Trust broadened its objects, and began to focus more on cultural heritage. As secretary, Kilmaine called for the establishment of a national organisation to organise fundraising for church repair. Kilmaine then acted as trustee of the Historic Churches Preservation Trust which was founded following the publication of the Church Assembly's report The Preservation of Our churches. In 1949 he was made chairman of the Oxford Society and served in this capacity until 1973. As chairman he organised an exhibition of items from the collections of the Ashmolean and the Bodleian in Goldsmiths' Hall, London, to coincide with the Coronation of Elizabeth II and the twenty-first anniversary of the Society. In 1956 he was appointed a CBE for his services to the nation. In 1972 he was awarded an honorary doctorate in civil law from the University of Oxford in recognition of his work. In his other roles as public servant he was a Vice-President of the Friends of Lambeth Palace Library, as well as a Trustee of the Dulverton Trust. He also served as the High Steward of Harwich from 1966 to 1976.

Browne died on 26 July 1978, and was succeeded by his son, John Browne, 7th Baron Kilmaine.

Peerage of Ireland
Preceded by John Browne	Baron Kilmaine; 1946 – 1978	Succeeded by John Francis Sandford Browne
