= John Ormsby Vandeleur (Ennis MP) =

Irish politician (1765–1828)

John Ormsby Vandeleur (1765 – 28 November 1828) was an Irish barrister, landowner and politician from Kilrush in County Clare. He sat in the House of Commons of Ireland from 1790 to 1800, and then in the House of Commons of the United Kingdom from 1801 to 1802.

== Early life and family ==
He was the eldest son of Crofton Vandeleur of Kilrush, MP for Ennis. His mother Alice was a daughter of Thomas Burton of Buncraggy, County Galway and Dorothy Forster, daughter of John Forster, Chief Justice of the Irish Common Pleas and his second wife Dorothy Evans.

Vandeleur was educated at Glasgow University, and then at Lincoln's Inn. He was called to the bar in Ireland in 1790. In 1800 he married Lady Frances Moore, daughter of Charles Moore, 1st Marquess of Drogheda and Lady Anne Seymour-Conway. They had two sons and two daughters.

The Vandeleur family was of Dutch origin. They were initially based at Ralahine in Sixmilebridge, where James Vandeleur settled in the late 1630s. They were compensated by the Cromwellians for losses during the Irish rebellion of 1641, and their holdings were confirmed by Charles II. They arrived in Kilrush in 1688, and prospered.

In 1794 John succeeded to his father's extensive estates, which by the mid-19th century included almost 20,000 acres in county Clare. Much of the estate was in the barony of Moyarta, where they held at least 17 townlands in the parish of Kilrush at the time of Griffith's Valuation in 1868. Vandeleur built Kilrush House in 1808, As the largest landlord in the area, Vandeleur effectively owned the town, which he set about developing. in the early 19th century. His efforts were continued during the 19th century by his successors Colonel Crofton Moore Vandeleur and Hector Vandeleur. However, their lack of compassion during the Great Famine and later record as absentee landlords left a legacy of hostility to the family, exacerbated by their widespread eviction of their tenants in the 1880s.

== Political career ==
Vandeleur was elected in 1790 as a member of parliament (MP) for the borough of Carlow, holding that seat until 1798 when he was returned for Lord Conyngham's pocket borough of Ennis until the Parliament of Ireland was abolished by the Act of Union in 1800. He won the ballot to be co-opted to the Westminster Parliament for Ennis, and in January 1801 he was sworn of the Privy Council of Ireland.

He was probably the Major Vandeleur of the Clare Militia who was Mentioned in dispatches by Major-General Henry Johnson after the Battle of New Ross during the Irish Rebellion of 1798.

In return for supporting the government in 1799 and voting for the Union, Vandeleur was appointed in 1766 as a Commissioner of Revenue, a post worth £1,000 a year (equivalent to £98756 in 2025). He was a Commissioner of Excise for Ireland from 1802 to 1806, and of Customs from 1806 to 1822.

== Death ==
Vandeleur died on 28 November 1828 at the home of his brother Thomas Burton Vandeleur, a High Court judge. He was succeeded in his estates by his oldest son Crofton Moore Vandeleur (1809–1881), who served as MP for County Clare from 1859 to 1874.

Parliament of Ireland
| Preceded by Charles des Voeux; Hon. James Caulfeild Browne | Member of Parliament for Carlow; 1790–1798; With: Augustus Cavendish Bradshaw 1790–1796; Sir Frederick Flood, Bt 1796–1798 | Succeeded by Henry Sadlier Prittie; William Elliot |
| Preceded by Nathaniel Sneyd; Sir Edward O'Brien, Bt | Member of Parliament for Ennis; 1798–1800; With: Sir Edward O'Brien, Bt | Parliament of Ireland abolished |
Parliament of the United Kingdom
| Preceded by Parliament of Ireland | Member of Parliament for Ennis; 1801–1802 | Succeeded by James Fitzgerald |
