= Sir Charles des Voeux, 1st Baronet =

Irish politician

Sir Charles Phillip Vinchon Des Voeux, 1st Baronet (died 24 August 1814) was an Irish politician.

Des Voeux was the son of Martin Anthony Vinchon de Bacquencourt, who had assumed the surname of Des Voeux after leaving France to settle in Ireland having abandoned the Roman Catholic faith. Des Voeux made a fortune in India before returning to Ireland and representing Carlow in the Irish House of Commons between 1783 and 1790. On 1 September 1787 he was created a baronet, of Indiaville in the Baronetage of Ireland. He represented Carlingford in the Irish Commons from 1790 to 1797. His son, Charles, succeeded in his title. Des Voeux was the grandfather of William Des Vœux.

Parliament of Ireland
Preceded by John Prendergast; Arthur Dawson	Member of Parliament for Carlow; 1783–1790; With: Sir John Browne, Bt (1783–1790); Hon. James Caulfield Browne (1790)	Succeeded by Augustus Cavendish-Bradshaw; John Ormsby Vandeleur
Preceded by Sir John Blaquiere; Thomas Coghlan	Member of Parliament for Carlingford; 1790–1797; With: James Blaquiere	Succeeded by Robert Ross; Robert Johnson
Baronetage of Ireland
New creation	Baronet (of Indiaville); 1787–1814	Succeeded by Charles Des Voeux
