= Frances Garnet Wolseley, 2nd Viscountess Wolseley =

Gardener and author (1872–1936)

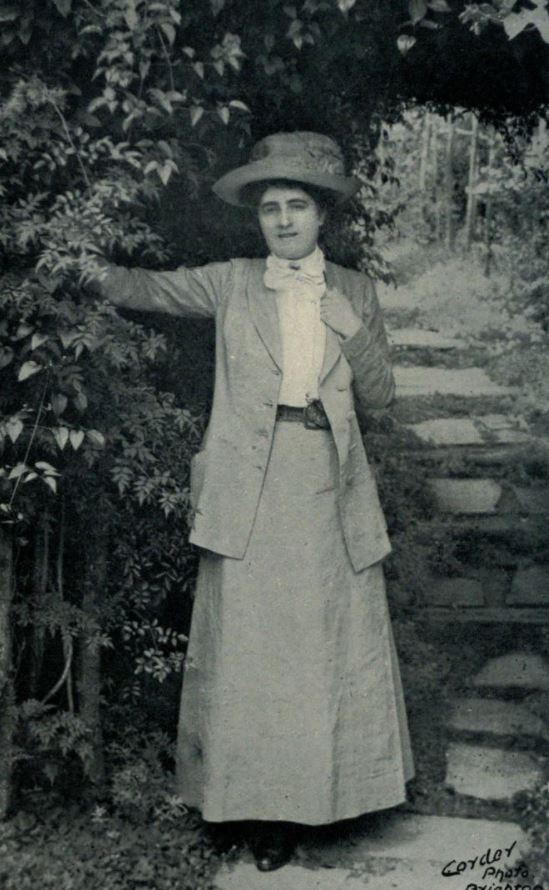
Lady Wolseley, from the cover of her 1916 book In a College Garden

Frances Garnet Wolseley, 2nd Viscountess Wolseley (15 September 1872 – 24 December 1936) was an English gardening author and instructor. Her Glynde College for Lady Gardeners in East Sussex had the patronage of famous gardening names such as Gertrude Jekyll, Ellen Willmott, and William Robinson.

== Background ==
Frances Wolseley was born in Pimlico, London, on 15 September 1872. Her parents were the British Army officer Sir Garnet Wolseley and Lady Wolseley (née Louisa Erskine). Garnet had declined a prestigious post in India due to Louisa's pregnancy. In a letter sent from Crimea to his aunt, Garnet described his daughter as:

neither exactly biped or quadruped, who cannot crawl or talk, who with large unmeaning eyes has no nose, but a weakly supported bald head, who bawls and screams by the hour and is only quiet when asleep, and who, pardon me, smells high. I know of no more unpleasant insect, and would prefer fondling a young crocodile to taking into my arms a newly-born embryo of humanity.

Garnet hoped for sons, but Frances remained the Wolseleys' only child. Though he was not outwardly affectionate, Garnet was fond of his daughter; he sent letters to her from his campaigns abroad and brought gifts. Her father's career forced the family to move a lot. Wolseley thus grew up in villas such as The Limes and Aylesford House and visited her father in Cyprus and Cairo. Wolseley relished her father's company, though he had little understanding of the needs of children. She resembled him in small stature, smart dress, and vigour. During her father's campaign in Egypt, Wolseley and her mother were at Bad Homburg, Germany. Prince Albert Edward was also there and attempted to bond with them; Wolseley was charged by her mother to act as a chaperone because he was a notorious womanizer. When they returned to London, Wolseley paid daily visits to her father's room at the War Office to follow the course of the campaign. When her father was made Viscount Wolseley in 1885, a special remainder was agreed to allow Wolseley to succeed to the title.

Wolseley received a private education, which was erratic due to the itinerant lifestyle resulting from her father's career. Wolseley wrote that it never occurred to her that she "could ask to be educated with a view to having ultimately a profession, for instinctively I knew that my education was conducted with a view to one end—that of becoming a capable wife of a rich man". Though not a supporter of women's suffrage or emancipation, Wolseley's father was aware of the emerging career opportunities for women and wanted her to be capable of taking an active role in the society. To prepare her and some of her friends for public speaking, he founded a Girls' Debating Society in the late 1880s. Wolseley's first social season in 1891 won her popularity and praise for her fashion sense.

== Career ==
Wolseley preferred country life with horses and dogs to the fripperies of high society. This became possible when the family settled at Trevor House in Glynde village in 1899, where she was able to pursue horticulture in a walled garden. Here, in 1902, she started a course in gardening and design for the daughters of middle-class families who wished to earn their own livings. Another motivation was to enable women to be useful in parts of the British Empire that needed skilled professionals, such as Australia and South Africa.

Wolseley fell out with her parents after they moved to Menton, France, in 1904. They let Trevor House, the greenhouse of which Wolseley needed to teach fruit cultivation. Lord and Lady Wolseley resented their daughter's independence. Her mother expected her to move too to take care of them and was enraged when Wolseley raised enough funds to rent the greenhouse from the new tenants. The Glynde College for Lady Gardeners became so popular that in 1907 it had to be moved to a 5-acre (2 ha) teaching garden with student accommodation just outside the village. The two-year course exacted high standards and attracted the patronage of famed gardeners such as Gertrude Jekyll, Ellen Willmott, and William Robinson. Inspired by her father, she ran a military discipline at the college, tolerating no mistakes and punishing all students if a plant died. Wolseley's harsh evaluations of students reveal that she found unrefined, poorly behaved, and slack women unsuitable to become professional gardeners.

Wolseley eventually left the day-to-day work in running the college to a couple of graduates in order to pursue a wider campaign. She travelled the country to inspect and advertise successful gardening businesses, horticultural colleges, and private gardens managed by women. She went to Canada and South Africa too, and was especially interested in promoting the adoption of Canadian women's institutes in the United Kingdom. In 1908 she published Gardening for Women, a book suggesting how women could contribute to rebuilding the rural economy and industries. An example of a New Woman, Wolseley expressed disdain for the idea that women are weak and prone to nervous disorders. Yet she was uncertain about women's suffrage and did not actively support the movement. In addition, she was concerned by working women embracing urban life.

Wolseley tried to maintain a relationship with her parents through weekly letters, but in 1909 was ordered not to visit them unless expressly invited. Lord Wolseley placed a memorandum with his solicitors, asserting that she had made a "self-elected desertion of her natural home" and that the rift was not "forced upon her by our conduct towards her". After a birthday present to her father was returned in 1910, Wolseley stopped writing to them.

As Lord Wolseley's memory deteriorated, Frances Wolseley was advised by a family friend to pay a visit, but her mother rebuffed her because she would not be staying long-term. She was elected to the Worshipful Company of Gardeners in 1913. Wolseley's father died on 31 March that year; she learned about it when she saw "a sandwich man carrying a large announcement, and to my horror saw my own surname". Her mother asked her to represent the family at the funeral in London. Wolseley inherited the viscountcy. His death did not bring the women closer. Wolseley's mother moved back to England, where she refused to see her during a serious illness in 1919. They met shortly before the dowager's death on 20 April 1920. Wolseley was shocked to learn that she had been disinherited by her mother, who had inherited her father's estate. All their possessions were left to the Royal United Services Institute.

About 1907, Wolseley became less involved with day-to-day college management, in favour of promoting the idea of women being professionally involved with horticulture. Her wider campaign in support of gardening led to a successful book, Gardening for Women (1908), which described ways women in horticulture could support the rural economy. She toured gardens and horticultural colleges in England, Canada and South Africa in that period. She was admitted into the Worshipful Company of Gardeners of the City of London in 1913. In the same year she inherited the viscountcy from her father (remainder by special arrangement) and then moved to Massetts Place near Lindfield, West Sussex with her mother.

There Wolseley's most important book, Women on the Land (1916) was written. It covers organization of smallholdings and market cooperatives, women's institutes, and gardening as a subject for schools. Her other titles included In a College Garden (1916), which described the work of the college, and Gardens, their Form and Design (1919), which stimulated the emergence of landscape architecture as a discipline a decade later. She moved in 1920 to Culpepers, Ardingly, West Sussex. Her later works mainly covered local history.

== Bequest ==
Viscountess Wolseley died on 24 December 1936 at Culpepers, Ardingly, Sussex, after a lengthy illness. She was buried at St Andrew's Church, Beddingham, East Sussex. She bequeathed her books and papers to Hove Corporation, along with funds to improve the library and set up a Wolseley Room. The material is retained among Hove Library's special collections. A biography describing her work appeared in 1939 by Marjory Pegram: The Wolseley Heritage: the Story of Frances Viscountess Wolseley and her Parents.

As Lady Wolseley never married or had children, the Wolseley title became extinct upon her death.

== Bibliography ==
- Kochanski, Halik (1999). Sir Garnet Wolseley: Victorian Hero. A&C Black. ISBN 1852851880.
- Page, Jane W. (2015). "Gardening for Women: Frances Garnet Wolseley and the Rise of the Professional Woman Gardener". 'Disciples of Flora': Gardens in History and Culture. Cambridge Scholars Publishing. p. 51. ISBN 978-1443881319.

Peerage of the United Kingdom
Preceded by Garnet Wolseley	Viscountess Wolseley; 1913–1936	Extinct
