= Des Voeux baronets =

Extinct baronetcy in the Baronetage of Ireland

The Des Voeux baronetcy, of Indiaville in the Queen's County, was a title in the Baronetage of Ireland. It was created on 1 September 1787 for Charles des Voeux, who had gained great wealth in India and who later represented Carlow and Carlingford in the Irish House of Commons. He was the son of Martin Anthony Vinchon de Bacquencourt, who had assumed the surname of Des Voeux. The latter was born in France but had settled in Ireland after incurring the wrath of his family for having abandoned the Roman Catholic faith. He was a writer of polemical works. The title became extinct when the ninth Baronet (a lieutenant colonel, twice mentioned in dispatches) was killed in action in September 1944 during the Battle of Arnhem of the Second World War.

== Des Voeux baronets, of Indiaville (1787) ==
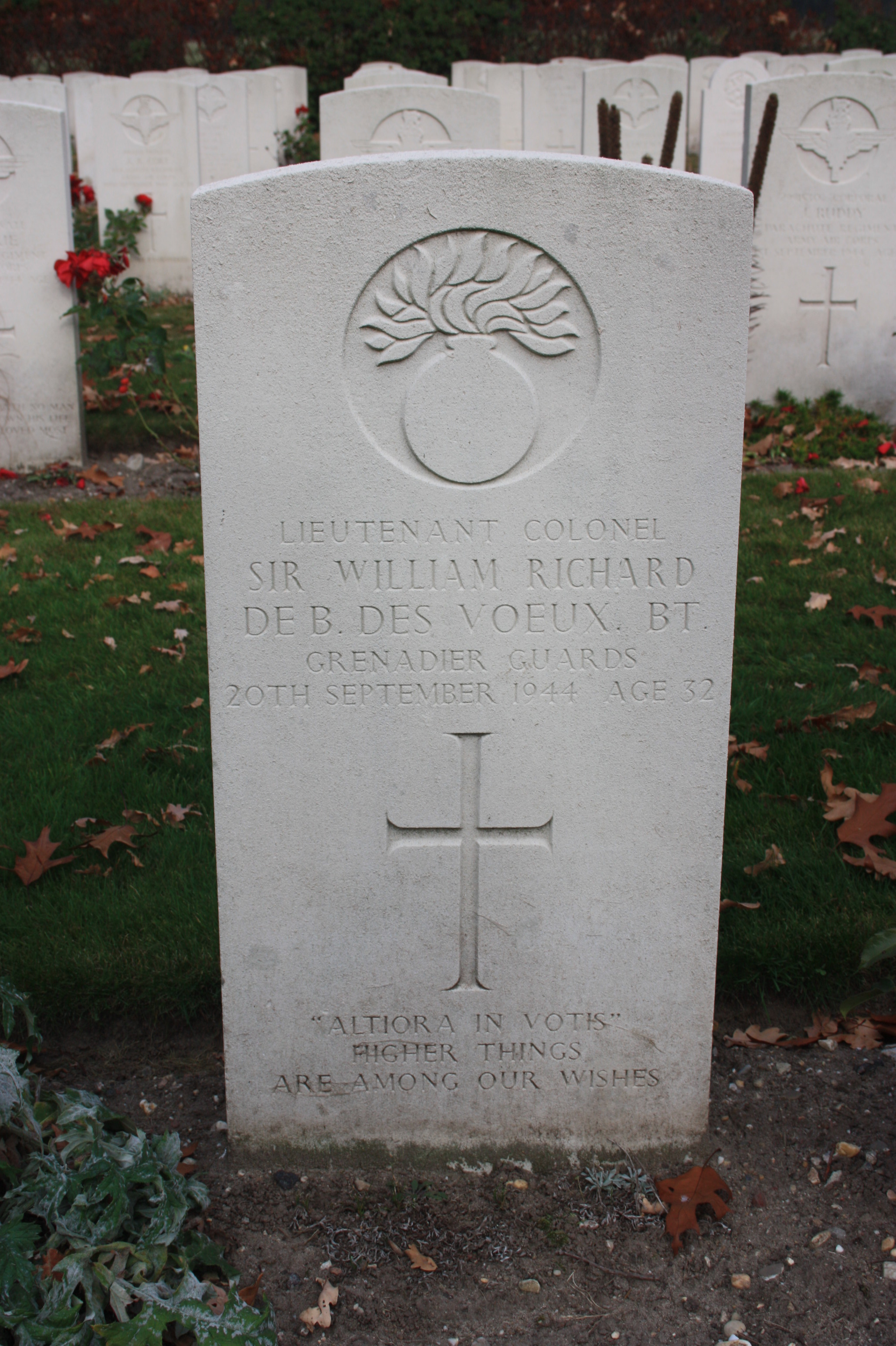
The grave of Sir William Richard Des Voeux, Arnhem Oosterbeek War Cemetery

- Sir Charles Phillip Vinchon Des Voeux, 1st Baronet (c. 1746–1814) – grandfather of Sir George William Des Vœux, Governor of Hong Kong
- Sir Charles Des Voeux, 2nd Baronet (1779–1858)
  - Charles Des Voeux (1802–1833)
- Sir Henry William Des Voeux, 3rd Baronet (1806–1868), vicar of Stapenhill-cum-Caldwell
- Sir Frederick Asheton Des Voeux, 4th Baronet (1818–1872)
- Sir Henry Dalrymple Des Voeux, 5th Baronet (1824–1894)
- Sir Charles Champagne Des Voeux, 6th Baronet (1827–1914) – brother of Sir George William Des Vœux, Governor of Hong Kong
- Sir Frederick Des Voeux, 7th Baronet (1857–1937)
- Sir Edward Alfred Des Voeux, 8th Baronet (1864–1941), killed in action aged 77 in Battle of Hong Kong while defending a power station in North Point as a private in the Hong Kong Volunteer Defence Corps's Hughes Group.
- Sir (William) Richard de Bacquencourt Des Voeux, 9th Baronet (1911–1944)
