= Augustus Cavendish-Bradshaw =

English politician

Hon. Augustus Cavendish Bradshaw (17 February 1768 – 11 November 1832), of Putney, Surrey and High Elms, near Watford, Hertfordshire, was an English politician, best remembered today for his role as co-respondent in the Westmeath divorce case of 1796.

== Family ==
He was born a younger son of Sir Henry Cavendish, 2nd Baronet of Doveridge Hall, Derbyshire and Phoenix Park, Dublin and his wife Sarah Bradshaw, 1st Baroness Waterpark, and was educated at Repton School and Trinity College, Cambridge. He adopted the additional name of Bradshaw to comply with the will of his maternal grandfather Richard Bradshaw.

== Career ==
He was a Member of Parliament (MP) for Carlow in the Parliament of Ireland from 1790 to 1796.

He was an MP for Honiton in the Parliament of the United Kingdom from 13 March 1805 to 1812 and for Castle Rising from 1812 to February 1817.

From 1812 until his death he was a Groom of the Bedchamber in the service of the Prince Regent, later King George IV, and then to King William IV. Despite this office, he is said to have been living "hand to mouth" in his last years. He spent much of his time lobbying to be appointed to any lucrative office which happened to be vacant, but Government after Government gave him a cold reception. The general view, even in an age when patronage was taken for granted, was that his character and habits disqualified him from any public office, especially one concerning the public revenues.

He was described as a "pretty, little, thin, delicate man."

== Marriage and scandal ==
He died in 1832. He had married in 1796 Maryanne, the daughter of James St John Jeffereyes of Blarney Castle by his wife Arabella Fitzgibbon, the divorced wife of George Nugent, 7th Earl of Westmeath. The divorce, on the grounds of Maryanne's adultery with Bradshaw (which was not seriously disputed), had aroused huge public interest and the associated action for criminal conversation brought by Lord Westmeath (this was then a necessary first step towards obtaining a divorce) resulted in large damages being awarded against Bradshaw in favour of the Earl, although it is unlikely that the money was ever paid, given Bradshaw's chronic lack of funds. There were no children. Maryanne died in 1849, aged almost 90. Her daughter-in-law once recorded indignantly that Maryanne had proposed that she have an affair with the Duke of Wellington, to advance the family's fortunes.

Parliament of Ireland
Preceded by Hon. James Browne; Charles des Voeux	Member of Parliament for Carlow; 1790–1796; With: John Ormsby Vandeleur	Succeeded by Sir Frederick Flood; John Ormsby Vandeleur
Parliament of the United Kingdom
Preceded by Sir John Honywood; George Shum	Member of Parliament for Honiton; 1805–1812; With: Sir John Honywood (1805-6); Richard Bateman-Robson (1806); Thomas Cochrane (1806-7); Sir Charles Hamilton (1807-12)	Succeeded by Howard Vyse; George Robinson
Preceded by Richard Sharp; Fulk Greville Howard	Member of Parliament for Castle Rising; 1812–1817; With: Fulk Greville Howard	Succeeded by Earl of Rocksavage; Fulk Greville Howard
