= John Browne (archdeacon of Limerick) =

Anglican priest

John Browne was an Anglican priest in Ireland in the 18th century.

Browne was educated at Trinity College, Dublin. He was a prebendary of Tullabracky in Limerick Cathedral from 1727 to 1733; and archdeacon of Limerick from 1733 until his resignation in 1740.
