= John Browne (archdeacon of Elphin) =

John Browne was an Irish Anglican priest in the late seventeenth century.

Browne was born in Kingsale and educated at Trinity College, Dublin. He was appointed Vicar choral of St Patrick's Cathedral, Dublin in 1682; and Archdeacon of Elphin in 1683. He died in 1700.
