= John Browne, 3rd Baron Kilmaine =

Anglo-Irish politician and landowner (1794-1873)

John Cavendish Browne, 3rd Baron Kilmaine (11 June 1794 – 13 January 1873) was an Anglo-Irish politician and landowner. He was an Irish representative peer (1849–73).

Kilmaine was the eldest son of James Browne, 2nd Baron Kilmaine and Anne Cavendish, daughter of Sir Henry Cavendish, 2nd Baronet.

He was educated at Trinity College, Dublin. He died in Dublin in 1873. Kilmaine was married twice and was succeeded by his eldest surviving son, Francis William.

== Marriage and issue ==
Lord Kilmaine was twice married and had 17 children, all but three of whom survived to adulthood.

He married firstly, in 1822, Elizabeth Lyon, daughter of David Lyon. They had three sons, all officers in the British Army who died unmarried, and four daughters:

- Lieut.-Col. Hon. James Lyon Browne (19 November 1822 – 5 September 1860)
- Hon. Isabella Anne Browne (1825 – 16 March 1916), married Miles Stapleton, 8th Baron Beaumont
- Capt. Hon. John Howe Montague Browne (14 March 1828 – 5 June 1860) of the 80th Foot
- Hon. Agnes Georgiana Browne (1827 – 27 June 1898), married Sir George Abercromby, 6th Baronet
- Capt. Hon. Cavendish Browne (15 January 1830 – †22 March 1855) of the 7th Royal Welch Fusiliers, killed at the Siege of Sevastopol
- Hon. Louisa Katherine Browne (26 October 1831 – 14 Jan 1877), married Maj. Robert Higginson Borrowes, grandson of Sir Kildare Borrowes, 5th Baronet
- Hon. Emily Anne Browne (14 March 1833 – 29 September 1923), married Charles Brownlow, 2nd Baron Lurgan
- Hon. Eliza Browne (15 November 1834 – 1 September 1835), died in childhood

Elizabeth died 1 December 1834. He married secondly, in 1839, Mary Law, daughter of Hon. Charles Ewan Law. They had five more daughters and four more sons:

- Hon. Mary Eleanor Frances Browne (22 March 1841 – 28 October 1869), married Maj. George Bagot and Col. Thomas Astell St Quintin
- Hon. Julia Sophia Browne (21 May 1842 – 15 February 1909), died unmarried
- Hon. Francis William (1843–1907), succeeded as 4th Baron Kilmaine
- Hon. Capt Edward Miles David Browne (22 October 1844 – 27 July 1878) of the Royal Navy
- Hon. Gertrude Eleanor Wilhelmina Browne (1 April 1846 – 1 February 1876)
- Hon. Evelyne Browne (5 January 1848 – 22 April 1878), married Maj.-Gen. Sir Owen Tudor Burne
- Hon. Charles Matthias Browne (24 February – 10 April 1849), died in childhood
- Hon. Arthur Henry Browne (29 April 1850 – 3 May 1908), married Clotilde Georgina Don-Wauchope, daughter of Sir John Don-Wauchope, 8th Baronet.
- Hon. Clementina Browne (10 May 1852 – 6 December 1864), died in childhood

Peerage of Ireland
Preceded by James Caulfeild Browne	Baron Kilmaine; 1825 – 1873	Succeeded by Francis Browne
Parliament of the United Kingdom
Preceded by The Earl of Gosford	Representative Peer for Ireland; 1849–1873	Succeeded by The Lord Inchiquin
