= John Browne (historian) =

John Browne (1823–1886), non-conformist historian, eldest son of James Browne (1781–1857), congregational minister, by his wife Eliza (d. 1834), daughter of Richard Gedge, was born at North Walsham, Norfolk, on 6 February 1823. He was educated (1839–44) at University College London (graduating B.A. 1843 at the London University), and at Coward College, Torrington Square, London, under Thomas William Jenkyn. Leaving college in 1844, he ministered to the congregational church at Lowestoft, Suffolk. His first publication was a Guide to Lowestoft (1845). He left Lowestoft in 1846, and on 10 September 1848 he succeeded Andrew Ritchie (d. 26 December 1848) as minister of the congregational church at Wrentham, Suffolk, where he was ordained on 1 February 1849. His ministry was plain and practical, and his platform power was considerable. From 1864 he was secretary of the Suffolk Congregational Union. At the end of 1877 he published his History of Congregationalism and Memorials of the Churches of Norfolk and Suffolk (8vo), a work on which he had been engaged for five years. It shows wide and accurate research, and he had long been a collector of manuscripts, rare volumes, and portraits bearing on his subject. In person short and stout, he was a man of solid qualities and genial frankness. He died on 4 April 1886, and was buried at Wrentham on 9 April. He married, in 1849, Mary Ann (d. 1899), eldest daughter of the Rev. H. H. Cross of Bermuda, and left a son and five daughters. Besides the above he published:

- Doles and Dissent [1845], 12mo.
- The Congregational Church at Wrentham [Suffolk] … its History and Biographies, 1854, 8vo.
- Dissent and the Church [1870], 8vo (in reply to Rev. J. C. Ryle, afterwards bishop of Liverpool).
- The History and Antiquities of Covehithe, 1874, 8vo.

He was a contributor to the Schaff-Herzog Religious Encyclopædia, New York, 1882-4, 8vo.
