= Francis Browne, 4th Baron Kilmaine =

Anglo-Irish politician (1843-1907)

Francis William Browne, 4th Baron Kilmaine JP DL (24 March 1843 – 9 November 1907) was an Anglo-Irish politician and landowner. He was an Irish representative peer and Sheriff of County Westmeath in 1870.

== Life ==
Browne was born in London, the eldest son of John Cavendish Browne, 3rd Baron Kilmaine, and his second wife, Mary Law, daughter of politician Charles Ewan Law (by his father's first wife, he had three half-brothers who died unmarried before their father.) He succeeded to his father's title in 1873. He held 14,700 acres (5,900 ha) in Ireland, and was a member of gentlemen's clubs in both London and Dublin.

He was elected as an Irish representative peer, holding that role from 1890 until his death. He was appointed as High Sheriff of County Westmeath in 1870.

== Personal life ==
In 1877, Browne married Alice Emily, daughter of Col. Dean Shute, sister of Sir Cameron Shute, and niece of General Sir Charles Cameron Shute. They had one son, John Edward Deane Browne, who married Lady Aline Kennedy, daughter of the 3rd Marquess of Ailsa.

He had a residence in Pau, and sponsored a golfing tournament there, with the Kilmaine Cup as prize.

Lord Kilmaine killed himself in Paris in November 1907 by jumping from the fourth-floor of the Hotel d'Iéna. He had reportedly suffered from "acute nervous disease" and chronic sleeplessness, and had gone to Paris for treatment. His wife was in the room when he jumped and witnessed him go to the window as if to look out, before suddenly throwing himself out. He died instantly from a skull fracture. His body was brought back to Ireland for burial.

Peerage of Ireland
Preceded by John Cavendish Browne	Baron Kilmaine; 1873–1907	Succeeded by John Edward Deane Browne
Political offices
Preceded by The Viscount Templetown	Representative peer for Ireland; 1890–1907	Succeeded by The Lord Curzon of Kedleston
