= Edward Harman =

Irish cricketer and physician

Personal information
- Full name: Edward Beversham Harman
- Born: September 1802; Cork, Ireland
- Died: 6 January 1866 (aged 64); Weeling, Norfolk, England
- Batting: Unknown

Domestic team information
- Years: Team
- 1837: Marylebone Cricket Club

Career statistics
Competition	First-class
Matches	1
Runs scored	0
Batting average	0.00
100s/50s	–/–
Top score	0*
Catches/stumpings	–/–
- Source: Cricinfo, 22 April 2021

Edward Beversham Harman (September 1802 – 6 January 1866) was an Irish first-class cricketer and physician.

The son of Beversham Harman and Mary Connolly, he was born at Cork in September 1802. He was educated in Edinburgh, before going up to Trinity College, Dublin in 1820 where he studied medicine. He was admitted as a fellow in 1830 to Gonville and Caius College, Cambridge. Harman became the first graduate of Trinity College to play first-class cricket in 1837, when he played for the Marylebone Cricket Club (MCC) against Oxford University at Lord's in 1837. Batting twice in the match, he ended the MCC first innings unbeaten on 0, while in their second innings he was dismissed without scoring by Charles William Beauclerk. Harman practiced medicine in England at Bath and Midhurst. He later retired to Norfolk, where he died at Weeling in January 1866.
