= John Browne (chemist) =

English chemist

John Browne or Brown (died 1735) was an English chemist, elected Fellow of the Royal Society in 1721.

His father John Browne of London was an apothecary, and Browne joined the Society of Apothecaries in 1697. He discovered the presence of magnesia in sea-water, and researched the manufacture of Prussian blue (invented by Johann Jacob Diesbach, in 1706), publishing on these topics in the Philosophical Transactions.
