= Henry des Voeux =

English cricketer

Personal information
- Full name: Henry Dalrymple Des Voeux
- Born: 7 September 1822; Carlton, Nottinghamshire, England
- Died: 20 January 1894 (aged 71); Westminster, London, England
- Batting: Unknown

Domestic team information
- Years: Team
- 1844: Oxford University

Career statistics
Competition	First-class
Matches	2
Runs scored	34
Batting average	17.00
100s/50s	–/–
Top score	25*
Balls bowled	–
Wickets	–
Bowling average	–
5 wickets in innings	–
10 wickets in match	–
Best bowling	–
Catches/stumpings	–/–
- Source: Cricinfo, 17 October 2013

Sir Henry Dalrymple Des Voeux, 5th Baronet (7 September 1822 – 20 January 1894) was an English cricketer. Des Voeux's batting style is unknown.

The son of the Reverend Henry Des Voeux and Frances Dalrymple, Des Voeux was born at Carlton, Nottinghamshire. He studied at Balliol College, Oxford, matriculating in 1841 and graduating B.A. in 1845. He made two first-class appearances for Oxford University Cricket Club, playing against the Marylebone Cricket Club and Cambridge University in 1844. In his two matches, he scored a total of 34 runs at an average of 17.00, with a high score of 25 not out.

Des Voeux married Lady Alice Magdalene Grey Egerton, daughter of Thomas Egerton, 2nd Earl of Wilton, on 13 August 1863. He succeeded Frederick Asheton Des Voeux, 4th Baronet as the 5th Baronet of the Des Voeux Baronetcy following his death in March 1872. Des Voeux died at Westminster, London on 20 January 1894 and was succeeded by Charles Champagne Des Voeux, 6th Baronet. Charles Frederick Des Voeux, a Royal Navy officer lost in the 1845 Franklin Expedition, was his brother and William Des Vœux, a colonial administrator, was his half-brother.

Baronetage of the United Kingdom
Preceded by Frederick Des Voeux	Baronet (of Indiaville); 1872–1894	Succeeded by Charles Des Voeux
