= John Browne, 5th Baron Kilmaine =

Anglo-Irish politician and landowner (1878-1946)

John Edward Deane Browne, 5th Baron Kilmaine JP DL (18 March 1878 – 27 August 1946) was an Anglo-Irish politician and landowner. He sat in the House of Lords, within the Parliament of the United Kingdom, as an Irish representative peer from 1911 until his death.

== Biography ==
Browne was born in England, the only child of Francis Browne, 4th Baron Kilmaine, and his wife Alice Emily Shute. He was a nephew of Sir Cameron Shute. He was educated at Magdalen College, Oxford, and abroad.

His father, who reportedly suffered from "acute nervous disease" for many years, died by suicide in 1907, when he jumped out of a hotel room in Paris, where he had gone for treatment. John Browne succeeded him as the 5th Baron Kilmaine. In 1911, he was elected to serve as an Irish representative peer in Parliament.

Kilmaine inherited considerable landed estates from his father. He sold the family seat of Gaulstown Park, County Westmeath, in 1918. He sold his estate at Nealepark in Neale, County Mayo, and his remaining Irish land in 1925 and moved to Great Britain.

Kilmaine died in Bexhill Hospital in 1946 of poisoning with carbolic acid, after drinking disinfectant. His physician testified at the inquest that his mental condition had deteriorated since an illness five months earlier. A jury returned a verdict of "suicide while of unsound mind."

== Marriage and issue ==
On 17 December 1906, he married Lady Aline Kennedy, daughter of the 3rd Marquess of Ailsa. They had three children:

- John Francis Archibald Browne, 6th Baron Kilmaine (22 September 1902 – 26 July 1978)
- Hon. Henry George Angus Browne (9 October 1911 – †8 September 1942), killed in the Second World War near El Alamein
- Hon. Alicia Evelyn Browne (Feb. 1909–1992), married Cdr Edward St John Edmonstone, son of Sir Archibald Edmonstone, 5th Baronet

Peerage of Ireland
Preceded by Francis Browne	Baron Kilmaine; 1907 – 1946	Succeeded by John Edward Deane Browne
Political offices
Preceded by The Viscount Bangor	Representative peer for Ireland; 1911–1946	Office lapsed
