= John Browne, 1st Baron Kilmaine =

Anglo-Irish politician and landowner

The Right Honourable The Lord Kilmaine

Member of Parliament for Carlow
- In office 1783–1790 Serving with Charles des Voeux
- Preceded by: Arthur Dawson; John Prendergast
- Succeeded by: Hon. James Browne; Sir Charles des Voeux, Bt

Member of Parliament for Newtownards
- In office 1776–1783 Serving with James Somerville
- Preceded by: Cornelius O'Callaghan; Arthur Dawson
- Succeeded by: William Ponsonby; Lodge Evans Morres

Personal details
- Born: 20 May 1726
- Died: 7 June 1794 (aged 68)
- Spouse: Hon. Alice Caulfeild (after 1764)
- Parent(s): Sir John Browne, 5th Baronet; Margaret Dodwell

John Browne, 1st Baron Kilmaine (20 May 1726 – 7 June 1794), known as Sir John Browne, 7th Baronet, from 1765 to 1789, was an Irish politician.

== Early life ==
Kilmaine was the younger son of Sir John Browne, 5th Baronet of The Neale, and Margaret Dodwell. His father was the de jure 5th Baronet, of The Neale, but like his predecessors had never assumed the title. His elder brother Sir George Browne, 6th Baronet, was the first to assume the title and, in 1765, Kilmaine succeeded him as seventh Baronet.

== Career ==
In 1776 he was elected to the Irish House of Commons for Newtownards, a seat he held until 1783, and then represented Carlow as a Member of Parliament (MP) between 1783 and 1789. In 1784, he purchased Gaulstown House from George Rochfort, 2nd Earl of Belvedere In 1789 he was raised to the Peerage of Ireland as Baron Kilmaine, of The Neale in the County of Mayo. Apart from his parliamentary career he also served as High Sheriff of Mayo in 1778 and 1788.

== Personal life ==
In 1764, Lord Kilmaine married the Hon. Alice Caulfeild, daughter of James Caulfeild, 3rd Viscount Charlemont and Elizabeth Bernard (a daughter of Francis Bernard, MP and judge of the Court of Common Pleas). Together, they were the parents of:

- James Caulfeild Browne, 2nd Baron Kilmaine (1765–1825), who married Hon. Anne Cavendish, daughter of Sir Henry Cavendish, 2nd Baronet and Sarah Cavendish, 1st Baroness Waterpark, in 1793.
- Hon. John Browne (1770–1855), who married Anne White, daughter of John White, of Jamaica, in 1797.
- Hon. George Browne (1774–1804), who married Mary Colston, daughter of Rev. Alexander Colston of Filkins Hall, Oxfordshire, in 1801.
- Hon. Alicia Margaret Browne (d. 1826), who married John Longworth, of Cregan Castle, in 1787.
- Hon. Maria Sarah Browne, who married Francis Longworth in 1795.
- Hon. Emily Juliana Browne, who married Rev. John Cromie, son of William Cromie and brother of Sir Michael Cromie, 1st Baronet, in 1787.
- Hon. Letitia Browne (d. 1809), who married Maj.-Gen. Sir John Ross in 1798.

Lord Kilmaine died in June 1794, aged 68, and was succeeded in his titles by his eldest son James. Lady Kilmaine died in 1797.

Parliament of Ireland
Preceded by Cornelius O'Callaghan; Arthur Dawson	Member of Parliament for Newtownards; 1776–1783; With: James Somerville	Succeeded by William Ponsonby; Lodge Evans Morres
Preceded by Arthur Dawson; John Prendergast	Member of Parliament for Carlow; 1783–1790; With: Charles des Voeux	Succeeded by Hon. James Browne; Sir Charles des Voeux, Bt
Peerage of Ireland
New creation	Baron Kilmaine; 1789–1794	Succeeded by James Caulfeild Browne
Baronetage of Nova Scotia
Preceded by George Browne	Baronet (of The Neale); 1765–1794	Succeeded by James Caulfeild Browne
