= Tullycorbet =

Civil parish in County Monaghan, Ireland

Coordinates: 54°10′01.6″N 6°53′46.0″W

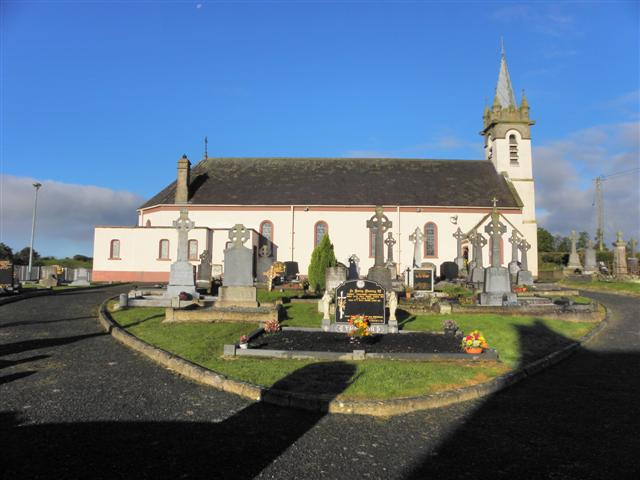
Church at Tullycorbet

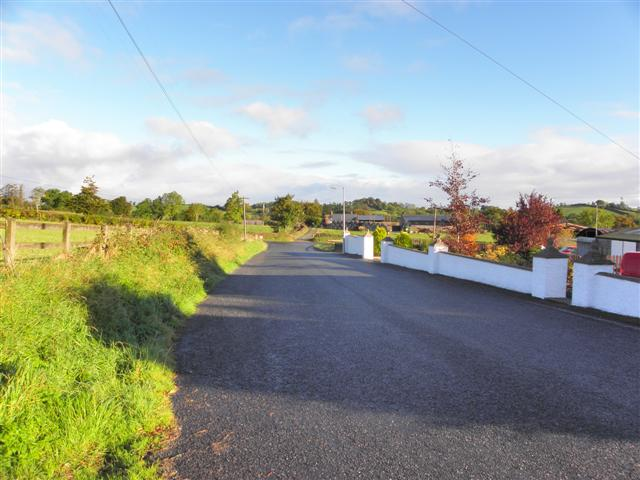
Road towards Creevagh

Tullycorbet is a civil parish in the centre of County Monaghan, Ireland north of the town of Ballybay, in the north of the Ballybay-Clones Municipal District and immediately south of the boundary to the Monaghan Municipal District. At the 2005 census, it had 727 Catholic households with a Catholic population of 2,153. There are approximately 85 families of other faith traditions. The Catholic parish of Tullycorbet is part of the Roman Catholic Diocese of Clogher.

Tradition links the parish to St. Patrick. Tullycorbet, which means "The Hill of the Chariot" (Tulach-Carbait) was named after the steep hill at Terrygeely (Tír Mhic Caollaí), where St. Patrick’s chariot allegedly broke down on his journey through the kingdom of Oriel. It was probably on the same hill that the first church was built, on the site of a ringed fort. From earliest times, St. Patrick was recognised as the patron saint. A Roman letter of 1415 mentions the church of St. Patrick at Tullycorbet.

It is marked on a survey map of 1591 as Tempell Tolagh-Corbet.

The Reverend Morgan Jellett was the Church of Ireland rector here in the 1820s. He had numerous distinguished descendants including John Hewitt Jellett, Provost of Trinity College Dublin, Eva Jellett, the pioneering woman doctor, and the celebrated artist Mainie Jellett.
