= Carlow (Parliament of Ireland constituency) =

Pre-1801 Irish constituency

- Former borough constituency for the Irish House of Commons
- County: County Carlow
- Borough: Carlow

1613–1801
- Seats: 2
- Replaced by: Carlow (UKHC)

Carlow was a constituency representing the borough of Carlow in the Irish House of Commons, the lower house in the Irish Parliament of the Kingdom of Ireland. It returned two members to the Parliament of Ireland from 1613 to 1800.

== History ==
The borough was incorporated in 1296 by Edward I and received further charters under the Stuart monarchs.

In the Patriot Parliament of 1689 summoned by James II, Carlow was represented by two members. Following the Acts of Union 1800 the borough retained one parliamentary seat in the United Kingdom House of Commons.

After the Acts of Union, its successor constituency returned one MP to the United Kingdom House of Commons from 1801 to 1885.

== Members of Parliament, 1613–1801 ==
- 1613–1615
  - Sir John Bere, Kt., Dublin, Serjeant-at-law,
  - Sir Robert Jacobe, Kt., Dublin (originally from Dorset), Solicitor General for Ireland
- 1634–1635
  - Barnabas O'Brien ("absent in England", replaced in January 1634, Edward Harman)
  - James Rawson, Dublin
- 1639–1649
  - Robert Hartpole of Shrule Castle, Queen's County (disqualified for Rebellion in June 1642)
  - Thomas Harman, Athy, County Kildare.
- 1661–1666
  - Sir John Temple, Palmerstown, County Dublin (Speaker)
  - Thomas Burdett, Garryhill, County Carlow.

=== 1689–1801 ===
Election	First MP	Second MP
1689	Mark Baggot	John Warren
1692	Sir William Russell, 4th Bt	Walter Weldon
1695	Edmond Jones	Robert Curtis
September 1703	Richard Wolseley	Hon. Charles Howard (Note: Declared not duly elected in 1703.)
1703	Richard Wolseley	Walter Weldon
1713	Thomas Burdett	Walter Weldon
1715	Richard Wolseley	Walter Weldon
1725	John Hamilton	Walter Weldon
1727	James Hamilton	Richard Wolseley (Note: Created a baronet in 1745.)
1761	Robert Burton	Richard Wolseley
1765	Robert Doyne	Richard Wolseley
1768	Edward Hoare	John Hyde (Note: Also elected for County Cork in 1768, for which he chose to sit.)
1769	Edward Hoare	James Somerville
June 1776	John Prendergast	Hon. John Ponsonby (Note: Also elected for County Kilkenny in 1776, for which he chose to sit.)
1776	John Prendergast	Arthur Dawson
1783	Sir John Browne, 7th Bt	Charles des Voeux (Note: Created a baronet in 1787.)
January 1790	Hon. James Caulfield Browne	Charles des Voeux
May 1790	Augustus Cavendish-Bradshaw	John Ormsby Vandeleur
1796	Sir Frederick Flood, 1st Bt	John Ormsby Vandeleur
January 1798	Henry Sadlier Prittie	William Elliot (Note: Also elected for St Canice in 1798, for which he chose to sit.)
1798	Henry Sadlier Prittie	John Wolfe
1801	Succeeded by the Westminster constituency Carlow	

== Bibliography ==
- O'Hart, John (2007). The Irish and Anglo-Irish Landed Gentry: When Cromwell came to Ireland. Vol. II. Heritage Books. ISBN 978-0-7884-1927-0.
- FitzGerald, Lord Walter (January 1911). "The Castle and Manor of Carlow, Part II". Journal of the County Kildare Archaeological Society and Surrounding Districts. 6 (5): 364–397 (396).
- Leigh Rayment's historical List of Members of the Irish House of Commons. Cites: Johnston-Liik, Edith Mary (2002). The History of the Irish Parliament 1692-1800 (6 volumes). Ulster Historical Foundation.
