= Fagan =

Fagan or Phagan is also a Norman-Irish surname, derived from the Latin word paganus meaning ‘rural’ or ‘rustic’. Variants of the name Fagan include Fegan and Fagen. It was brought to Ireland during the Anglo-Norman invasion in the twelfth century and is now considered very Irish. In some cases it is a reduced Anglicized form of Gaelic Ó Fágáin or Ó Faodhagáin, which are probably dialect forms of Ó hÓgáin (see Hogan, Hagan) and Ó hAodhagáin (see Hagan). Irish lenited f (spelled fh) is soundless. Notable people with the surname include:

- Alex Fagan (1950–2010), chief of the San Francisco Police Department
- Andrew Fagan (born 1962), New Zealand singer, writer and songwriter
- Ann Fagan Ginger (1925–2025), American lawyer, teacher, writer, and political activist
- Audrey Fagan (1962–2007), Australian Capital Territory Chief Police Officer
- Brian M. Fagan (1936–2025), British archaeologist and anthropologist
- Carson Fagan (born 1982), Caymanian international football player
- Chris Fagan (born 1961), Australian football coach
- Cliff Fagan (1911–1995), American president of the Basketball Hall of Fame
- Clint Fagan (born 1981), American baseball umpire
- Colin Fagan, Jamaican politician
- Craig Fagan (1982), English footballer
- Cyril Fagan (1896–1970), Irish astrologer
- David Fagan (1961), New Zealand champion sheep shearer
- Ed Fagan (born 1952), American former lawyer
- Eleanora Fagan (1915–1959), better known as Billie Holiday, American jazz singer
- Garth Fagan (born 1940), Jamaican modern dance choreographer
- Gerald Fagan (born 1939), Canadian conductor
- Ina Fagan (1893–1985), birth name of American actress Ina Claire
- James Fagan (MP) (1800–1869), Irish Repeal Association politician and timber merchant
- James Fagan (musician) (born 1972), folk musician from Sydney, Australia
- James Fleming Fagan (1828–1893), Confederate major general in the American Civil War
- James H. Fagan (born 1947), American politician
- J. B. Fagan (1873–1933), Irish-born actor, theatre manager, producer and playwright in England
- Jim Fagan (1882–1948), Australian rules footballer
- Jeffrey Fagan (born 1946), professor at Columbia Law School
- Joe Fagan (1921–2001), manager of Liverpool F.C.
- Joe Fagan (politician) (born 1987), Scottish politician
- Joseph Fagan (1941–2013), American psychologist
- Jermaine Fagan, Jamaican reggae artist
- Kate Fagan (born 1981), American sports reporter
- Kevin Fagan (cartoonist) (born 1956), American cartoonist, creator of the syndicated comic strip Drabble
- Kevin Fagan (doctor) (1909–1992), Australian doctor and World War II hero
- Kevin Fagan (American football) (born 1963), former defensive end for the San Francisco 49ers
- Laurie Fagan, Australian rugby league footballer
- Linda L. Fagan (born July 1, 1963), served as the 27th commandant of the United States Coast Guard from June 2022 to January 2025
- Louise Fagan, Canadian director and producer
- Mark M. Fagan (1869–1955), former mayor of Jersey City, New Jersey
- Mary Fagan (born 1939), former Lord Lieutenant of Hampshire
- Michael Fagan, a software designer credited with inventing the Fagan inspection process for formal software inspections
- Michael Fagan (intruder) (born 1948), Buckingham Palace intruder
- Mike Fagan (born 1980), American bowler
- Myron Coureval Fagan (1887–1972), American playwright, editor, producer and cinematographer
- Oisin Fagan (born 1973), Irish boxer, former WBO Middleweight title holder
- Patsy Fagan (born 1951), Irish snooker player
- Roy Fagan (1905–1990), Australian politician and deputy premier of Tasmania
- Shaun Fagan (born 1984), Scottish association footballer
- Vincent Martel Fagan, the defendant of Fagan v Metropolitan Police Commissioner

== See also ==
- Fagen, surname
- Fagin (surname)
- Mary Phagan, 13-year-old factory girl murdered in 1913, allegedly by Leo Frank
