= Charles Tottenham (1807–1886) =

British Member of Parliament

Member of Parliament for New Ross
- In office 18 March 1856 – 8 June 1863
- Preceded by: Charles Gavan Duffy
- Succeeded by: Charles George Tottenham
- In office 7 May 1831 – 9 July 1831
- Preceded by: Charles Powell Leslie
- Succeeded by: William Wigram

Personal details
- Born: 14 November 1807
- Died: 1 June 1886 (aged 78)
- Party: Conservative/Tory
- Spouse: Isabella Catherine Airey (m. 1833; died 1863)
- Children: Five, including Charles George Tottenham
- Parent(s): Charles Tottenham; Catherine Wigram

Charles Tottenham (14 November 1807 – 1 June 1886) was an Irish Conservative and Tory politician.

== Early life and family ==
Tottenham was the first son of his namesake Charles Tottenham and Catherine, daughter of Sir Robert Wigram, 1st Baronet. He entered Trinity College, Cambridge in 1825 before, in 1833, marrying Isabella Catherine, daughter of Sir George Airey and Catherine née Talbot, with whom he had three sons, including Charles George Tottenham, and two daughters.

== Political career ==
Tottenham was first elected Tory MP for New Ross at the 1831 general election, following in the footsteps of his father and his uncle, Ponsonby Tottenham, who had been MPs for the seat between 1802 and 1805, and 1805 and 1806 respectively. At the 1831 election, it was his father's turn to nominate, and Tottenham was returned unopposed with the support of his father as well as County Wexford Whig MP Henry Lambert, who Tottenham had subscribed £100 towards for the 1830 general election.

At the time of his election, the local press assumed Tottenham had been sent to parliament for the "avowed purpose" of supporting the Grey Ministry's reform bill, which he later supported at its second reading. Shortly after, he resigned his seat, accepting the office of Steward of the Chiltern Hundreds, a move blamed on his father wanting a "thorough-going Tory" in the seat.

While Tottenham sought to return to Parliament for the same seat—standing unsuccessfully at the 1835 general election—it was another 21 years before this happened. Between these times, he was High Sheriff of Wicklow in 1845 and 1846, and High Sheriff of Wexford in 1846 and 1847.

Standing as a Conservative at a by-election in 1856—caused by the resignation of Charles Gavan Duffy—he held the seat until 1863 when he again resigned through the Chiltern Hundreds office in order to allow for his son, Charles George Tottenham to take the seat.

Parliament of the United Kingdom
Preceded by Charles Powell Leslie	Member of Parliament for New Ross; May 1831–Aug 1831	Succeeded by William Wigram
Preceded by Charles Gavan Duffy	Member of Parliament for New Ross; 1856–1863	Succeeded by Charles George Tottenham
Civic offices
Preceded by William Wentworth Fitzwilliam Hume	High Sheriff of Wicklow; 1845	Succeeded by Robert Craven Wade
Preceded by Patrick W. Redmond	High Sheriff of Wexford; 1846	Succeeded by Harry Alcock
