= James Fagan =

James Fagan may refer to:

- James Fagan (farmer-politician) (1806–1868), Irish-born farmer who spent two terms as a Wisconsin state assemblyman
- James Fagan (MP) (1800–1869), Irish Repeal Association politician and timber merchant
- James Fagan (musician) (born 1972), folk musician from Sydney, Australia
- James Fleming Fagan (1828–1893), farmer, public official, and general in the Confederate States Army
- James H. Fagan (born 1947), American attorney and politician in the Massachusetts House of Representatives
- J. B. Fagan (1873–1933), Irish-born actor, theatre manager, producer and playwright in England
- Jim Fagan (1882–1948), Australian rules footballer
- Jim Fagan (actor) (1944–2017), American actor and voiceover artist
