= Fagan (disambiguation) =

Fagan is a Norman-Irish surname.

Fagan may also refer to:

- Fagan (saint), second century Welsh bishop and saint
- Fagan, Kentucky, United States, an unincorporated community
- Mount Fagan, South Georgia Island

== See also ==
- St Fagans, Cardiff, Wales
- Battle of St Fagans, a 1648 battle in the Second English Civil War
- Fagan Commission, a commission set up by the South African government in 1948 to examine segregation
- Fagan inspection, a software inspection process
- Fagan v. Metropolitan Police Commissioner, a court case in England
- Fagin (disambiguation)
- Fagen (disambiguation)
