= Villiers Francis Hatton =

Member of Parliament for County Wexford
- In office 16 July 1841 – 10 August 1847 Serving with James Power
- Preceded by: James Power; John Maher
- Succeeded by: James Fagan; Hamilton Knox Grogan Morgan

Personal details
- Born: 20 August 1787
- Died: 8 February 1859 (aged 71)
- Party: Whig

Villiers Francis Hatton (20 August 1787 – 8 February 1859) was an Irish Whig politician.

Hatton was the son of George Hatton MP (died 1831) of Clonard, co. Wexford, and his wife Lady Isabella Seymour-Conway, daughter of the Marquess of Hertford.

He first served in the Royal Navy but retired as a captain in 1812 after being wounded. He was elected Whig MP for County Wexford at the 1841 general election and held the seat until 1847 when he did not seek re-election.

Later made a Vice Admiral, he was a member of the United Service Club. He married Cecilia La Touche, daughter of David La Touche MP (1769-1816) and Lady Cecilia Leeson, daughter of Lord Milltown, and had by her a son and two daughters.

Parliament of the United Kingdom
Preceded by James Power; John Maher	Member of Parliament for County Wexford; 1841–1847; With: James Power	Succeeded by James Fagan; Hamilton Knox Grogan Morgan
