= Patrick McMahon (MP) =

Member of Parliament for New Ross
- In office 18 November 1868 – 9 February 1874
- Preceded by: Charles George Tottenham
- Succeeded by: John Dunbar

Member of Parliament for County Wexford
- In office 26 July 1852 – 24 July 1865 Serving with John George (1859–1865); John Hatchell (1857–1859); John George (1852–1857)
- Preceded by: James Fagan; Hamilton Knox Grogan Morgan
- Succeeded by: John George; James Power

Personal details
- Born: 1813
- Died: 19 December 1875 (aged 62)
- Party: Liberal
- Other political affiliations: Ind. Irish (1852–1859); Radical (until 1852)

Patrick McMahon (1813 – 19 December 1875) was an Irish Liberal, Independent Irish Party, and Radical politician.

McMahon was first elected as one of the two Members of Parliament (MPs) for County Wexford as a Radical at the 1852 general election but shortly after joined the Independent Irish Party when it formed later that year. He held the seat until 1865, being re-elected as an Independent Irish Party candidate in 1857, and then as a Liberal Party candidate, upon its creation, in 1859.

He was later elected MP as a Liberal candidate for New Ross in the 1868 general election and held the seat until 1874 when he stood down.

Parliament of the United Kingdom
Preceded by Charles George Tottenham	Member of Parliament for New Ross; 1868 – 1874	Succeeded by John Dunbar
Preceded by James Fagan; Hamilton Knox Grogan Morgan	Member of Parliament for County Wexford; 1852 – 1865; With: John George (1859–1865); John Hatchell (1857–1859); John George (1852–1857)	Succeeded by John George; James Power
