= Sir James Power, 2nd Baronet =

Irish politician (1800–1877)

Sir James Power Bt

Member of Parliament for County Wexford
- In office 24 July 1865 – 24 November 1868 Serving with Arthur MacMurrough Kavanagh (1866–1868); John George (1865–1866)
- Preceded by: Patrick McMahon; John George
- Succeeded by: John Talbot Power; Matthew Peter D'Arcy
- In office 27 January 1835 – 10 August 1847 Serving with Villiers Francis Hatton (1841–1847); John Maher (1835–1841)
- Preceded by: Cadwallader Waddy; Henry Lambert
- Succeeded by: James Fagan; Hamilton Knox Grogan Morgan

Personal details
- Born: 6 December 1800
- Died: 30 September 1877 (aged 76)
- Party: Liberal
- Other political affiliations: Repeal Association
- Spouse: Jane Anne Eliza Talbot (m. 1843)
- Children: Six, including John Talbot Power, James Talbot Power and Thomas Talbot Power
- Parent(s): John Power; Mary Brennan

Sir James Power, 2nd Baronet (6 December 1800 – 30 September 1877) was an Irish Liberal and Repeal Association politician, barrister, and Governor of the Bank of Ireland.

== Family ==
Power was the son of John Power, a whiskey distiller and head of the Powers company, and Mary (née Brennan). He married Jane Ann Eliza Talbot, daughter of John Hyacinth Talbot in 1843 and together they had six children: John; James; Thomas; Mary Jane; Gwendoline Anna Eliza; and, Francis Mary Ursula.

== Political career ==
Power was elected Repeal Association Member of Parliament (MP) for County Wexford in the 1835 general election and held the seat until 1847 when he stood down. He was later elected MP as a Liberal candidate for the same constituency in the 1865 general election and held the seat until 1868 when he stood down.

== Baronetcy ==
Power succeeded to the baronetcy in 1855 upon the death of his father. Upon his death, his son John Talbot Power succeeded.

== Other activities ==
Power was Governor of the Bank of Ireland, Chairman of the Dublin, Wicklow and Wexford Railway, and Commissioner for Charitable Bequests in Ireland. He was also a Deputy Lieutenant. In 1859, he was High Sheriff of Dublin City.

Parliament of the United Kingdom
Preceded by Patrick McMahon; John George	Member of Parliament for County Wexford; 1865 – 1868; With: Arthur MacMurrough Kavanagh (1866–1868); John George (1865–1866)	Succeeded by John Talbot Power; Matthew Peter D'Arcy
Preceded by Cadwallader Waddy; Henry Lambert	Member of Parliament for County Wexford; 1835 – 1847; With: Villiers Francis Hatton (1841–1847); John Maher (1835–1841)	Succeeded by James Fagan; Hamilton Knox Grogan Morgan
Baronetage of the United Kingdom
Preceded by James Power	Baronet (of Edermine); 1855–1877	Succeeded by John Talbot Power
