= John Hyacinth Talbot =

Irish politician (1794–1868)

Member of Parliament for New Ross
- In office 7 August 1847 – 15 July 1852
- Preceded by: Robert Gore
- Succeeded by: Charles Gavan Duffy
- In office 10 December 1832 – 6 July 1841
- Preceded by: William Wigram
- Succeeded by: Robert Gore

Personal details
- Born: 1794
- Died: 30 April 1868 (aged 73–74)
- Party: Repeal Association

John Hyacinth Talbot (1794 – 30 April 1868) of Ballytrent, County Wexford was an Irish Repeal Association politician.

He was the son of Matthew Talbot of Ballynamony, County Wexford and Jane, Countess d'Arcy and educated at Stonyhurst College, Lancashire.

Talbot was first elected Repeal Association MP for New Ross at the 1832 general election and held the seat until 1841, when he did not seek re-election. He sat again for the seat from 1847 to 1852 when, again, he did not seek re-election. He was selected as High Sheriff of Wexford for 1855.

He was a member of the Reform Club.

He married twice. In 1822, he married Anne Eliza Redmond, daughter of Walter Redmond of Wexford, a banker. In 1851 he married Eliza, daughter of Sir John Power, Bt, with whom he had a son and heir, also John Hyacinth Talbot, born in 1851.

Parliament of the United Kingdom
Preceded by William Wigram	Member of Parliament for New Ross; 1832–1841	Succeeded by Robert Gore
Preceded by Robert Gore	Member of Parliament for New Ross; 1847–1852	Succeeded by Charles Gavan Duffy
