= Cadwallader Waddy =

Anglo-Irish soldier and politician

Member of Parliament for County Wexford
- In office 3 July 1834 – 29 December 1834
- Preceded by: Robert Carew
- Succeeded by: John Maher; James Power

Cadwallader Waddy (15 February 1783 – 7 February 1843) was an Anglo-Irish soldier and politician who sat for six months as Member of the UK Parliament for County Wexford, Ireland, in 1834.

== Biography ==
Cadwallader Waddy was born on 15 February 1783 to Richard Waddy of Kilmacoe, County Wexford, and Penelope, heiress of Nicholas Hatchell (d. 1788). The Waddy family of Clougheast Castle in the south-east of County Wexford traced their lineage back to Edmond Waddy (d. June 1684), a cornet in the New Model Army who took part in the 1649–1653 Cromwellian conquest of Ireland, and who received a grant of Clougheast and other Wexford lands.

He entered the army by purchasing a commission as an ensign in the 60th Regiment of Foot in 1800, later serving as a lieutenant in the 46th, a captain in the 15th, then transferring to the 69th and the 89th in 1804. He sold his commission and retired from the Army in December 1806.

He first stood as a Repeal Association candidate for the Wexford constituency in the 1832 United Kingdom general election, but was unsuccessful, receiving no votes. The Repeal Association had been formed in 1830 to campaign for a repeal of the Acts of Union of 1800 between Great Britain and Ireland, but the election was won by two Whig candidates, Robert Carew and Henry Lambert.

In 1834 Robert Carew was raised to the Peerage of Ireland as Baron Carew, of the County of Wexford, and this elevation to the House of Lords necessitated his resignation from the Commons, which was effective 13 June 1834.

Waddy stood in the ensuing 1834 County Wexford by-election, on 3 July 1834, against one William Hervey, winning a narrow victory of 1,003 to 933 votes. He held the seat for a matter of six months until the prorogation of the 11th Parliament of the United Kingdom on 29 December 1834. He did not stand in the 1835 United Kingdom general election.

== Family ==
Waddy married Margaret, daughter of Joseph Swan of Buckstown, County Wexford; the couple had five sons and two daughters.

- Richard Waddy (11 August 1814 - 10 July 1881); entered the Army as an officer in the 50th Regiment of Foot, which he commanded during the Crimean War. Later promoted to General after service in New Zealand.
- Joseph Swan Waddy (b. 25 August 1815), of Kilmacoe
- Cadwallader Waddy (b. 27 May 1817)
- Percival Swan Waddy (b. 16 February 1819), MD.
- William P. Waddy (b. 19 June 1821), entered the East India Company army and became a captain in the Bengal Artillery
- Anne Eliza Waddy (b. 24 February 1823)
- Penelope Hatchell Waddy (b. 22 October 1832)

He also had two illegitimate daughters, born c. 1807 and 1808. In 1827, he was sued by the mistress of the boarding school where they had been sent, claiming that since 1816 he had failed to make payments for their maintenance, including their clothes and medical care. Damages were claimed at £600; the case was settled at £200 plus sixpence in costs.

Cadwallader Waddy died on 7 February 1843; Margaret on 23 November 1852.

Parliament of the United Kingdom
Preceded by Robert Carew; Henry Lambert	Member of Parliament for County Wexford; 1834–1834; With: Henry Lambert	Succeeded by John Maher; James Power
