= Fagin (disambiguation) =

Fagin is a major character in the Dickens novel Oliver Twist.

Fagin may also refer to:

- Fagin (surname)
- Fagin (comics), character in Brotherhood of Mutants
- Fagin, NATO reporting name for the Chengdu J-20 jet fighter

== See also ==
- Fagan (disambiguation)
