= 1878 New Ross by-election =

UK Parliamentary by-election

The 1878 New Ross by-election was fought on 17 December 1878. The by-election was fought due to the death of the incumbent Home Rule MP, John Dunbar. It was won by the Conservative candidate Charles George Tottenham.
