= Hamilton Knox Grogan Morgan =

Irish politician

Member of Parliament for County Wexford
- In office 10 August 1847 – 26 July 1852 Serving with James Fagan
- Preceded by: Villiers Francis Hatton; James Power
- Succeeded by: Patrick McMahon; John George

Personal details
- Born: Hamilton Knox Grogan; 1807
- Died: 9 June 1854 (aged 46–47)
- Party: Repeal Association
- Other political affiliations: Whig; Conservative

Hamilton Knox Grogan Morgan (1807 – 9 June 1854), known as Hamilton Knox Grogan until 1828, was an Irish Whig, Repeal Association and Conservative politician.

He married Sophia Maria Rowe, daughter of Ebenezer Radford Rowe, with whom he had three children: Elizabeth, Sophia and Jane Colclough Morgan (died 1872).

After unsuccessfully contesting the seat as a Conservative in 1841, Morgan was elected Repeal Association MP for County Wexford at the 1847 general election. He held the seat until 1852 when he sought election as a Whig but was defeated.

He was a member of the Reform Club. Hamilton and Sophia were largely responsible for construction of Johnstown Castle, County Wexford.

Parliament of the United Kingdom
Preceded by Villiers Francis Hatton; James Power	Member of Parliament for County Wexford; 1847–1852; With: James Fagan	Succeeded by Patrick McMahon; John George
