= Bach Music Festival of Canada =

The Bach Music Festival of Canada or Festival Bach is an international music festival in honor of Johann Sebastian Bach that takes place in the heart of Southern Ontario and is held on a biennial basis. The festival features regional, national and international musicians interpreting the works of Bach.

== History ==
The inaugural event took place in 2011. The festival was initially referred to as the Bach Festival of South Huron but was changed in 2013. Choral conductor Gerald Fagan OOnt has been the artistic director of the festival from its inception. Canadian producer Louise Fagan served as the festival's executive director through 2015.

The festival changed its name to Huron Waves Music Festival in 2020.

== Content ==
The festival includes a diverse slate of concerts and guest artists. While the music of Bach is the main focus, the festival also includes artist covering different genres of music as well. A master class for local musicians is also included as part of the week long celebration. The Brown Bag Lunch Concert Series are daily concerts offered free of charge, with audience members encouraged to bring their lunches to the venues and enjoy an entertaining hour of music from a variety of artists.

The festival has included by performances by a wide variety of musicians from solo violinist Lara St. John, to the Harvestehuder Kammerchor (chamber choir) from Hamburg, Germany, to the Angel Voice Choir from Beijing, to the Juno Award-nominated Jazz singer Fern Lindzon. The final concert of the festival is traditionally a performance of one of Bach's large choral-orchestral works conducted by festival artistic director Gerald Fagan.

== Locations ==
The festival takes place in various locations throughout South Huron. Past venues included:

- Trivitt Memorial Anglican Church, Exeter, Ontario
- St. Peter's Evangelical Lutheran Church, Zurich, Ontario
- South Huron Recreation Centre, Exeter, Ontario
- The Huron Tractor Show Room, Exeter, Ontario
- St James Westminster Anglican Church, London, Ontario
