= Charles George Tottenham =

Irish military officer and politician (1835–1918)

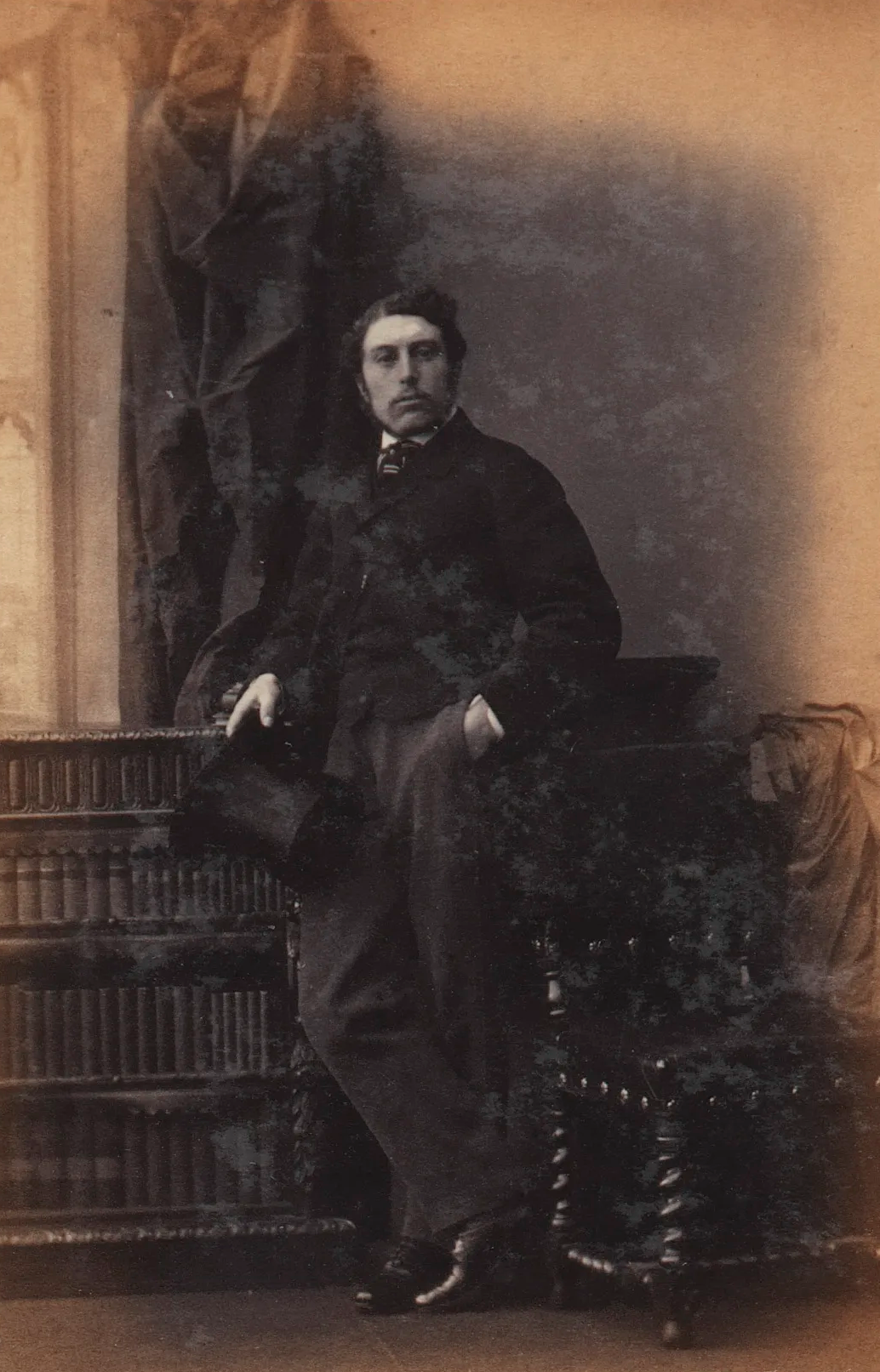
Portrait by Camille Silvy, 1861

Lieutenant Colonel Charles George Tottenham (1835 – 23 April 1918) from County Wexford was an Irish officer in the British Army and a Conservative politician.

Tottenham was the son of Charles Tottenham (1807–1886) from Ballycurry and New Ross in County Wexford and his wife Isabella Airey, daughter of General Sir George Airey. His family were wealthy land owners in County Wexford. He was educated at Eton, and married his cousin, who was a daughter of Reverend Sir Francis Stapleton, 7th Baronet, of Henley-on-Thames.

He was commissioned in the Scots Fusilier Guards, and served in the Crimean War as a Lieutenant & Captain. He was promoted to Captain & Lieutenant-Colonel on 15 June 1860.

He was elected at the June 1863 New Ross by-election as the Member of Parliament (MP) for borough of New Ross, following the resignation of his father. He was the fourth father-and-son-Tottenham to hold the seat in the Westminster Parliament; two previous generations had been MPs for New Ross in the pre-union Parliament of Ireland. (Most of the town of New Ross was owned by the Tottenhams, who let it on short leases. They had shared control of the borough with the Leigh family of Rosegarland, and alternated the nomination of MPs).

Tottenham was re-elected in 1865, but stood down at the 1868 election. He was returned to the House of Commons again a by-election in December 1878, following the death of the Home Rule League MP John Dunbar. However, he was defeated at the 1880 general election by the Home Rule candidate Joseph Foley.

He was a Deputy Lieutenant of County Wicklow and High Sheriff of Wexford in 1874. On 11 December 1871 he was appointed Honorary Colonel of the Wicklow Rifles (converted into the Wicklow Artillery Militia in 1877), a position he held until his death.

Parliament of the United Kingdom
Preceded by Charles Tottenham	Member of Parliament for New Ross; 1863 – 1868	Succeeded by Patrick McMahon
Preceded by John Dunbar	Member of Parliament for New Ross; 1878 – 1880	Succeeded by Joseph Foley
