= Sir George Bowyer, 7th Baronet =

Sir George Bowyer DL
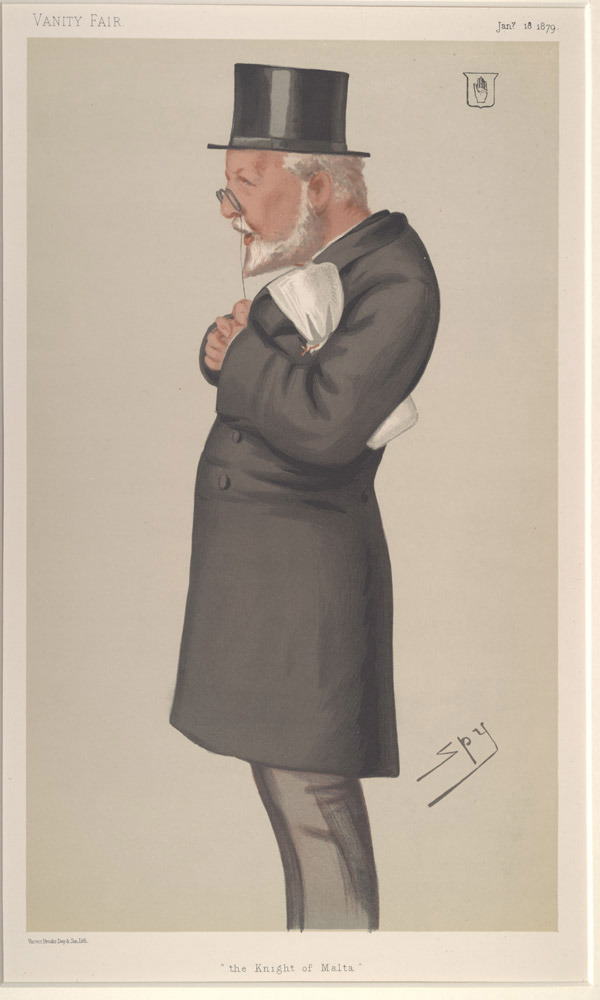
- "The Knight of Malta". Caricature by "Spy" published in Vanity Fair in 1879

7th and 3rd Baronet

Member of Parliament for Dundalk
- In office 1852–1868
- Preceded by: William McCullagh Torrens
- Succeeded by: Philip Callan

Member of Parliament for County Wexford
- In office 1874–1880
- Preceded by: John Talbot Power and Matthew Peter D'Arcy
- Succeeded by: John Barry and Garrett Byrne

Personal details
- Born: 8 October 1811 Radley, Berkshire, England
- Died: 7 June 1883 (aged 71) London, England
- Party: Liberal
- Occupation: Barrister, politician

Sir George Bowyer, 7th and 3rd Baronet (8 October 1811 – 7 June 1883), was a British Barrister-at-Law and Liberal politician.

== Life ==
Born in Radley Hall in Berkshire (now Oxfordshire), he was the son of Sir George Bowyer, 6th Baronet, and Anne Hammond Douglas. Bowyer was a cadet at the Royal Military Academy, Woolwich, and was then called to the Bar by the Middle Temple in 1836. He received an honorary Master of Arts by the University of Oxford in 1839 and an honorary Doctor of Civil Laws in 1844. One year later, he changed to Lincoln's Inn. In 1860, he succeeded to both baronetcies held by his father.

Having contested Reading in the 1849 Reading by-election, Bowyer became a Member of Parliament (MP) for Dundalk from 1852 to 1868 and for County Wexford from 1874 to 1880. The Roman Catholic Church of St John of Jerusalem in Great Ormond Street in London and Our Lady and St Edmund's Church, Abingdon, were built at his own cost. He was made a Knight of Justice of the Order of Malta, a Knight Grand Cross of the Order of St. Gregory the Great and a Grand Collar of the Sacred Military Constantinian Order of Saint George. Bowyer served as chamberlain to Pius IX, who appointed him a Knight of the Great Ribbon of the Order of Pius IX. He was further a deputy lieutenant of Berkshire. He was a member of the Manchester Unity Order of Oddfellows, at one time he led a procession under a banner named Loyal Bowyer Union Lodge of Odd Fellows.

Bowyer died in King's Bench Walk in London, aged 71 and unmarried. He was found dead in his bed and was buried in Radley in Berkshire on 7 June 1883. He was succeeded in both baronetcies by his younger brother William.

== Works ==
- Commentaries on Modern Civil Law (1848)
- Introduction to the Study and Use of the Civil Law (1874)

== Notes ==
Parliament of the United Kingdom
Preceded by William McCullagh Torrens	Member of Parliament for Dundalk; 15 July 1852–21 November 1868	Succeeded by Philip Callan
Preceded by John Talbot Power; Matthew Peter D'Arcy	Member of Parliament for County Wexford; 23 February 1874–14 April 1880; With: Keyes O'Clery	Succeeded by John Barry; Garrett Byrne
Baronetage of England
Preceded by Sir George Bowyer	Baronet of Denham Court; 1860–1883	Succeeded by Sir William Bowyer
Baronetage of Great Britain
Preceded by Sir George Bowyer	Baronet of Radley; 1860–1883	Succeeded by Sir William Bowyer
