= 1914 West Wicklow by-election =

UK Parliamentary by-election

The 1914 West Wicklow by-election was held on 20 August 1914. The by-election was held due to the death of the incumbent Irish Parliamentary MP, Edward Peter O'Kelly. It was won by the Irish Parliamentary candidate John Thomas Donovan who was unopposed due to a War-time electoral pact.
