= Fagen =

Fagen is a surname. Notable people with the surname include:

- Arthur Fagen (born 1951), American conductor
- David Fagen (1875–1901), African-American soldier
- Donald Fagen (born 1948), American musician
- Graham Fagen (born 1966), Scottish artist
- Leslie Fagen, American litigator

== See also ==
- Fagan, surname
- Fagin (surname)
