= Robert Gore (MP) =

Royal Navy officer and politician

Member of Parliament for New Ross
- In office 6 July 1841 – 7 August 1847
- Preceded by: John Hyacinth Talbot
- Succeeded by: John Hyacinth Talbot

Personal details
- Born: 1810
- Died: 4 August 1854 (aged 43–44)
- Party: Whig

Robert Gore (1810 – 4 August 1854) was a Royal Navy officer and Whig politician.

He was the son of colonel William John Gore and Caroline née Hales and, at some point, gained the rank of captain in the Royal Navy, and the office of Chargé d'Affaires in Uruguay.

Gore was elected Whig MP for New Ross at the 1841 general election and held the seat until 1847 when he did not seek re-election.

He was a member of Brooks's, Crockford's, the Naval and Military Club, and the Travellers Club.

Parliament of the United Kingdom
Preceded by John Hyacinth Talbot	Member of Parliament for New Ross; 1841–1847	Succeeded by John Hyacinth Talbot
