= John Barry (MP) =

Irish nationalist politician

Member of Parliament for County Wexford
- In office 14 April 1880 – 15 June 1883 Serving with Garrett Byrne 1880–83; John Francis Small 1883–85
- Preceded by: Sir George Bowyer, Bt. and Keyes O'Clery
- Succeeded by: Constituency divided

Member of Parliament for South Wexford
- In office 1885–1893
- Preceded by: New constituency
- Succeeded by: Peter Ffrench

Personal details
- Born: 1845 Wexford, County Wexford, Ireland
- Died: January 27, 1921 (aged 75–76)
- Relatives: Tim Healy (distant cousin)

John Barry (1845 – 27 January 1921) was a politician. He was born in Wexford and moved with his family to England when he was a small child. Alongside Michael Davitt and Mark Ryan, he trafficked arms. He was a member of the Supreme Council of the Irish Republican Brotherhood and a founding member of the Home Rule Confederation of Great Britain. He was elected as an Irish National Federation Member of Parliament for South Wexford in 1885, resigning in 1893. He was a close friend and distant cousin of Tim Healy. On his retirement he pursued his business interests with great success.

In R. Barry O'Brien's The Life of Charles Stewart Parnell, 'X' describes John Barry as 'fat and well favored'. He was one of 'the stoutest men of the Irish party'.

Parliament of the United Kingdom
Preceded by Sir George Bowyer, Bt; Keyes O'Clery	Member of Parliament for County Wexford; 14 April 1880 – 1885; With: Garrett Byrne 1880–83; John Francis Small 1883–85	Constituency divided
New constituency	Member of Parliament for South Wexford; 1885 – 1893	Succeeded by Peter Ffrench
