= 1910 West Wicklow by-election =

UK Parliamentary by-election

The 1910 West Wicklow by-election was held on 29 March 1910. The by-election was held due to the death of the incumbent Irish Parliamentary MP, James O'Connor. It was won by the Irish Parliamentary candidate Edward Peter O'Kelly, who was unopposed.
