= John Francis Small =

Irish politician

John Francis Small (1853 – 5 July 1923) was an Irish nationalist politician of the Irish Parliamentary Party. He sat in the House of Commons of the United Kingdom as a member of parliament (MP) for County Wexford from 1883 to 1885, and for South Down from 1885 to 1886.

John Francis Small was admitted as a solicitor in 1875 and later became coroner for South Armagh, and a Poor Law Guardian. He died, in 1923, at his home in Hill Street, Newry.

Parliament of the United Kingdom
Preceded by Garrett Byrne; John Barry	Member of Parliament for County Wexford; 1880 – 1885; With: John Barry	constituency divided
New constituency	Member of Parliament for South Down; 1885 – 1886	Succeeded by Michael McCartan
