= Peter Ffrench =

Irish politician

Member of Parliament for South Wexford
- In office 1893–1918
- Preceded by: John Barry
- Succeeded by: James Ryan

Personal details
- Born: c. 1844 Bannow, County Wexford, Ireland
- Died: November 1, 1929 (aged 84–85)

Peter Ffrench (c. 1844 – 1 November 1929) was an Irish politician.

Born in Bannow in County Wexford, Ffrench followed his father into farming. He served as a magistrate and a coroner, and was selected as the anti-Parnellite Irish National Federation candidate at the 1893 South Wexford by-election, winning the seat without facing an opponent. He then held the seat at each subsequent election, no opponent coming forward until the 1918 general election, when he lost to James Ryan in a Sinn Féin landslide.

Parliament of the United Kingdom
Preceded by John Barry	Member of Parliament for South Wexford; 1893 – 1918	Succeeded by James Ryan
