= Edward Peter O'Kelly =

Irish nationalist politician

Member of Parliament for East Wicklow
- In office April 1895 – July 1895

Member of Parliament for West Wicklow
- In office March 1910 – July 1914

Personal details
- Born: 4 July 1846
- Died: 22 July 1914 (aged 68)
- Spouse: Judith Whelan (1862–1911)
- Children: 11

Edward Peter O'Kelly (4 July 1846 – 22 July 1914) was an Irish nationalist politician who was a member of the House of Commons of the United Kingdom both in 1895, and between 1910 and 1914.

== Early life ==
O'Kelly was born on 4 July 1846 in Baltinglass, County Wicklow, Ireland. He grew up attending school at Mountrath Monastery and St Patrick's College, in Carlow, Ireland.

== Career ==
O'Kelly was elevated to Chairman of the Baltinglass Board of Guardians in 1893 and was appointed a magistrate in 1894. He was a passionate Land Leaguer.

In April 1895, O'Kelly was elected as a Member of Parliament as an Anti-Parnellite Irish National Federation candidate at the by-election for the East Wicklow constituency, following the resignation of John Sweetman MP. However, Parliament was dissolved on 8 July for the 1895 general election, and O'Kelly decided not to defend his seat. Instead, O'Kelly focused on local politics, becoming the first chairman of the newly established Wicklow County Council in 1899.

In 1910, O'Kelly returned to the House of Commons as the Member of Parliament (MP) representing West Wicklow, having been elected unopposed at a March 1910 by-election to fill the vacancy caused by the death of James O'Connor. He was re-elected unopposed in December 1910 and held the seat until he died in office in July 1914, aged 68. in Marylebone, London, England, from diabetes.

== Personal life ==
O'Kelly married Judith Whelan (1862–1911), the daughter of Myles Whelan of Athy, County Kildare, in 1882, by whom he had issue: Eileen (Sister Marie de Chantal), Anne Edith (Sister Mary Magdalen), Edward John, Teresa Mary (Sister Mary Marguerite), Joseph, Mrs Agnes Lynch; Father Patrick O'Kelly SJ, Muriel Carmella, Prof. William D. O'Kelly, Genevieve, and Mrs Ethel O'Loughlin.

O'Kelly was a close friend of Douglas Hyde, first President of Ireland, and John Redmond, a leader of the Irish Parliamentary Party.

Parliament of the United Kingdom
Preceded by John Sweetman	Member of Parliament for East Wicklow; April 1895 – July 1895	Succeeded by William Joseph Corbet
Preceded by James O'Connor	Member of Parliament for West Wicklow; March 1910 – 1914	Succeeded by John Thomas Donovan
