= John Donovan (Irish politician) =

Irish politician (1878–1922)

John Thomas Donovan (1878 – 17 January 1922) was an Irish barrister and nationalist politician who sat in the House of Commons from 1914 to 1918.

Born in Belfast, Donovan was called to the bar at the King's Inns in 1914.

He was elected as the Member of Parliament (MP) for West Wicklow at a by-election in August 1914, to fill the vacancy caused by the death of Edward Peter O'Kelly. He did not defend his seat at the 1918 general election, when it was won by the Sinn Féin candidate. He stood instead in South Donegal, where he was defeated by Sinn Féin's Peter J. Ward.

Parliament of the United Kingdom
Preceded by Edward Peter O'Kelly	Member of Parliament for West Wicklow; 1914 – 1918	Succeeded by Robert Barton
