= County Wexford (UK Parliament constituency) =

UK parliamentary constituency in Ireland, 1801–1885

- Former county constituency for the House of Commons
- County: County Wexford

1801–1885
- Seats: 2
- Created from: County Wexford (IHC)
- Replaced by: North Wexford; South Wexford

County Wexford was a UK Parliament constituency in Ireland, which returned two Members of Parliament (MPs) to the United Kingdom House of Commons.

== Boundaries ==
This constituency comprised the whole of County Wexford, except for the parliamentary boroughs of New Ross and Wexford.

== Members of Parliament ==
Year	1st Member	1st Party	2nd Member	2nd Party
1801, 1 January	Viscount Loftus		Abel Ram	Tory
1806, 27 May	Caesar Colclough	Whig	Abel Ram	Tory
1806, 17 November	John Colclough	Whig	Robert Shapland Carew	
1807, 1 June	Abel Ram	Tory	William Congreve Alcock	Tory
1812, 10 October	Robert Carew	Whig	Sir Frederick Flood, Bt	
1818, 21 July	Robert Carew	Whig	Caesar Colclough	Whig
1820, 21 March	Robert Carew	Whig	Viscount Stopford	Tory
1830, 19 August	Arthur Chichester	Whig	Viscount Valentia	Tory
1831, 18 May	Arthur Chichester	Whig	Henry Lambert	Whig
1831, 27 September	Robert Carew	Whig	Henry Lambert	Whig
1834, 3 July	Cadwallader Waddy	Repeal Association	Henry Lambert	Whig
1835, 27 January	John Maher	Repeal Association	James Power	Repeal Association
1841, 16 Jul	Villiers Francis Hatton	Whig	James Power	Repeal Association
1847, 10 August	James Fagan	Repeal Association	Hamilton Knox Grogan Morgan	Repeal Association
1852, 26 July	Patrick McMahon	Ind. Irish	John George	Conservative
1857, 10 March	Patrick McMahon	Ind. Irish	John Hatchell	Whig
1859, 16 May	Patrick McMahon	Liberal	John George	Conservative
1865, 24 Jul	Sir James Power, Bt.	Liberal	John George	Conservative
1866, 15 November	Sir James Power, Bt.	Liberal	Arthur MacMurrough Kavanagh	Conservative
1868, 24 November	John Talbot Power	Liberal	Matthew Peter D'Arcy	Liberal
1874, 23 February	Sir George Bowyer, Bt.	Home Rule	Keyes O'Clery	Home Rule
1880, 14 April	John Barry	Parnellite Home Rule League	Garrett Byrne	Parnellite Home Rule League
1883, 15 June	John Barry	Parnellite Home Rule League	John Francis Small	Irish Parliamentary
1885	Constituency divided: see North Wexford and South Wexford			

== Elections ==
=== Elections in the 1830s ===
General election 1830: County Wexford
Party	Candidate	Votes	%
Whig	Arthur Chichester	528	34.5
Tory	George Arthur Annesley, Viscount Valentia	415	27.1
Whig	Henry Lambert (MP)	300	19.6
Tory	John Rowe	289	18.9
Turnout		c. 766	c. 71.9
Registered electors		1,066	
Majority		113	7.4
Whig hold			
Majority		115	7.5
Tory hold			

General election 1831: County Wexford
Party	Candidate	Votes	%	±%
Whig	Arthur Chichester	546	36.0	+1.5
Whig	Henry Lambert (MP)	513	33.8	+14.2
Tory	George Arthur Annesley, Viscount Valentia	440	29.0	−17.0
Nonpartisan	Darcy Talbot	17	1.1	New
Majority		73	4.8	−2.6
Turnout		c. 758	c. 71.1	c. −0.8
Registered electors		1,066		
Whig hold		Swing	+5.0	
Whig gain from Tory		Swing	+11.4	

Chichester was elevated to the peerage, becoming 1st Baron Templemore and causing a by-election.

By-election, 27 September 1831: County Wexford
Party	Candidate	Votes	%
Whig	Robert Carew	Unopposed	
Registered electors		1,066	
Whig hold			

General election 1832: County Wexford
Party	Candidate	Votes	%	±%
Whig	Robert Carew	1,550	41.3	+5.3
Whig	Henry Lambert (MP)	1,423	38.0	+4.2
Tory	John Rowe	756	20.2	N/A
Tory	John Wilson Croker	13	0.3	N/A
Tory	Martin Doyle	7	0.2	N/A
Repeal	Cadwallader Waddy	0	0.0	New
Majority		667	17.8	N/A
Turnout		2,193	75.4	c. +4.3
Registered electors		2,907		
Whig hold		Swing	+5.3	
Whig hold		Swing	+4.2	

Carew was elevated to the peerage, becoming 1st Baron Carew and causing a by-election.

By-election, 3 July 1834: County Wexford
Party	Candidate	Votes	%	±%
Repeal	Cadwallader Waddy	1,004	51.8	+51.8
Whig	William Hervey	933	48.2	−31.1
Majority		71	3.6	N/A
Turnout		1,937	c. 54.3	c. −21.1
Registered electors		c. 3,567		
Repeal gain from Whig		Swing	+41.5	

General election 1835: County Wexford
Party	Candidate	Votes	%	±%
Repeal (Whig)	John Maher (MP)	1,358	32.3	−9.0
Repeal (Whig)	James Power	1,349	32.1	−5.9
Conservative	Anthony Cliffe	759	18.1	−2.1
Conservative	Patrick Walter Redmond	735	17.5	+17.0
Majority		590	14.0	−3.8
Turnout		c. 2,101	c. 58.9	c. −16.5
Registered electors		3,567		
Repeal gain from Whig		Swing	−8.2	
Repeal gain from Whig		Swing	−6.7	

General election 1837: County Wexford
Party	Candidate	Votes	%
Repeal (Whig)	John Maher (MP)	Unopposed	
Repeal (Whig)	James Power	Unopposed	
Registered electors		3,442	
Repeal hold			
Repeal hold			

=== Elections in the 1840s ===
General election 1841: County Wexford
Party	Candidate	Votes	%	±%
Whig	Villiers Francis Hatton	873	40.0	N/A
Repeal	James Power	859	39.3	N/A
Conservative	Hamilton Knox Grogan Morgan	450	20.6	New
Conservative	Samuel Carter Hall	1	0.0	New
Turnout		1,092 (est)	62.8 (est)	N/A
Registered electors		1,739		
Majority		14	0.7	N/A
Whig gain from Repeal		Swing	N/A	
Majority		409	18.7	N/A
Repeal hold		Swing	N/A	

General election 1847: County Wexford
Party	Candidate	Votes	%	±%
Repeal	James Fagan	Unopposed		
Repeal	Hamilton Knox Grogan Morgan	Unopposed		
Registered electors		2,165		
Repeal hold				
Repeal gain from Whig				

=== Elections in the 1850s ===
General election 1852: County Wexford
Party	Candidate	Votes	%	±%
Independent Irish	Patrick McMahon	2,302	28.6	New
Conservative	John George	1,556	19.3	New
Whig	Hamilton Knox Grogan Morgan	1,545	19.2	New
Whig	Robert Carew	1,412	17.5	New
Peelite	Edward Westby Nunn	1,248	15.5	New
Turnout		4,032 (est)	68.1 (est)	N/A
Registered electors		5,917		
Majority		746	9.3	N/A
Independent Irish gain from Repeal		Swing	N/A	
Majority		11	0.1	N/A
Conservative gain from Repeal		Swing	N/A	

General election 1857: County Wexford
Party	Candidate	Votes	%	±%
Independent Irish	Patrick McMahon	4,306	44.4	+15.8
Whig	John Hatchell	2,870	29.6	−7.1
Conservative	John George	2,522	26.0	+6.7
Turnout		4,849 (est)	76.1 (est)	+8.0
Registered electors		6,371		
Majority		1,436	14.8	+5.5
Independent Irish hold		Swing	+11.5	
Majority		348	3.6	N/A
Whig gain from Conservative		Swing	−6.9	

General election 1859: County Wexford
Party	Candidate	Votes	%	±%
Liberal	Patrick McMahon	3,906	40.1	−4.3
Conservative	John George	3,024	31.0	+5.0
Liberal	John Hatchell	2,810	28.9	−0.7
Turnout		4,870 (est)	76.0 (est)	−0.1
Registered electors		6,406		
Majority		882	9.1	−5.7
Liberal hold		Swing	−3.4	
Majority		214	2.1	N/A
Conservative gain from Liberal		Swing	+5.0	

=== Elections in the 1860s ===
General election 1865: County Wexford
Party	Candidate	Votes	%	±%
Conservative	John George	3,548	44.8	+13.8
Liberal	James Power	2,616	33.1	+4.2
Liberal	Patrick McMahon	1,750	22.1	−18.0
Majority		932	11.8	+9.7
Turnout		5,731 (est)	88.8 (est)	+12.8
Registered electors		6,457		
Conservative hold		Swing	+13.8	
Liberal hold		Swing	−1.4	

George resigned after being appointed judge of the Queen's Bench Division.

By-election, 15 November 1866: County Wexford
Party	Candidate	Votes	%	±%
Conservative	Arthur MacMurrough Kavanagh	2,640	58.4	N/A
Conservative	John Pope Hennessy	1,883	41.6	N/A
Majority		757	16.8	+5.0
Turnout		4,523	70.0	−18.8
Registered electors		6,457		
Conservative hold		Swing	N/A	

General election 1868: County Wexford
Party	Candidate	Votes	%	±%
Liberal	John Power	Unopposed		
Liberal	Matthew Peter D'Arcy	Unopposed		
Registered electors		6,204		
Liberal hold				
Liberal gain from Conservative				

=== Elections in the 1870s ===
General election 1874: County Wexford
Party	Candidate	Votes	%	±%
Home Rule	George Bowyer	3,407	39.0	New
Home Rule	Keyes O'Clery	2,784	31.8	New
Liberal	John Power	1,332	15.2	N/A
Conservative	Robert Westley Hall Dare	1,224	14.0	New
Majority		1,452	16.6	N/A
Turnout		5,652 (est)	91.4 (est)	N/A
Registered electors		6,184		
Home Rule gain from Liberal		Swing	N/A	
Home Rule gain from Liberal		Swing	N/A	

=== Elections in the 1880s ===
General election 1880: County Wexford
Party	Candidate	Votes	%	±%
Parnellite Home Rule League	John Barry	3,075	42.4	N/A
Parnellite Home Rule League	Garrett Byrne	2,879	39.7	N/A
Conservative	John George Gibbon	847	11.7	−2.3
Home Rule	Keyes O'Clery	457	6.3	−25.5
Majority		2,032	28.0	+11.4
Turnout		4,281 (est)	74.0 (est)	−17.4
Registered electors		5,783		
Home Rule hold		Swing		
Home Rule hold		Swing		

Byrne resigned, causing a by-election.

By-election, 13 June 1883: County Wexford
Party	Candidate	Votes	%	±%
Irish Parliamentary	John Francis Small	Unopposed		
Registered electors		5,367		
Irish Parliamentary hold				
