= Garrett Byrne (Irish politician) =

Garrett Michael Byrne (1829 – 3 March 1897) was an Irish nationalist and MP in the House of Commons of the United Kingdom of Great Britain and Ireland and as member of the Irish Parliamentary Party represented County Wexford, 1880–1883, and West Wicklow, 1885–1892. He was a strong supporter of Charles Stewart Parnell.

Byrne was born at Arklow, Co. Wicklow, in 1829. He was a great-grandson of Garrett Byrne of Ballymanus, a leader of the Irish Rebellion of 1798. He was the second son of Joseph Byrne of Ballybrack, Co. Dublin and of Mary Anne Byrne, second daughter of Garrett Byrne of Dungarvstown, Co. Wicklow. He was educated privately and at Leopardstown College. In 1855 he married Sarah Dillon, second daughter of James Dillon, a Wicklow merchant. She died in 1875.

At an early age Byrne was overseer for the contractors building the Dublin and Belfast Junction Railway. He was then the Liverpool agent for a Dublin brewery. In 1856 he was appointed an officer of Customs and Surveyor to the Board of Trade at Liverpool.

He was selected as one of two Irish Home Rule Parnellite candidates for Wexford at the general election of 1880 over the sitting Home Ruler Keyes O'Clery, who was backed by the Catholic clergy. This led to a serious outbreak of violence at a meeting at Enniscorthy on Easter Sunday, 28 March 1880, in which Parnell himself was physically attacked. O’Clery went on to contest the election the following month, but Byrne was elected by a majority of over 2,000. In the vital vote of 17 May 1880 in which Parnell displaced William Shaw as chairman of the Home Rule League, Byrne voted for Parnell. He took part in the subsequent Parnellite campaign of Parliamentary obstruction. He resigned in June 1883 after just over three years owing to ill-health, to be replaced in his Wexford seat by another Home Ruler, John Francis Small, who was returned unopposed.

Byrne stood for Parliament again for West Wicklow in the general election of December 1885, when he defeated the Conservative candidate by more than 4 to 1. When the Irish Parliamentary Party split in December 1890 over Parnell's leadership, Byrne supported Parnell. Shortly afterwards he was declared bankrupt, in January 1891, as a result of the insolvency of the estate and mortgage broking business which he had set up in 1885. This had been established with a capital of £10,000 and owned various properties in London, Liverpool and Dublin. It had failed owing to inability to realise property due to depreciation in its value, and losses through bad debts. Byrne's ill-health was also mentioned as a factor. Although the business was insolvent, it had a surplus of assets and after this was realised, Byrne's bankruptcy was discharged in August 1891.

Byrne retired from Parliament at the 1892 general election, aged about 63; his West Wicklow seat was contested in the Parnellite interest by Charles Stewart Parnell's brother John Howard Parnell, but was won by an Anti-Parnellite, James O'Connor.

Byrne died in Mercer's Hospital, Dublin, on 3 March 1897 of septicaemia contracted as a result of a head wound sustained in an accident on the previous 13 February in Grafton Street, Dublin, when he was run down by a Hackney carriage. The inquest on 4 March was conducted by his former Parnellite Parliamentary colleague Dr Joseph Kenny, by then City Coroner.

== Sources ==
- Irish Times, 5 March 1897
- F. S. L. Lyons, Charles Stewart Parnell, London, Collins, 1977
- T. P. O'Connor, The Parnell Movement, London, Kegan Paul Trench & Co., 1886
- Thomas Pakenham, The Year of Liberty: The story of the great Irish Rebellion of 1798, London, Hodder & Stoughton, 1969
- The Times, 6 October and 27 November 1885, 15 January, 19 & 25 February, 12 March, 13 August 1891, 20 May 1892
- Brian M. Walker (ed.), Parliamentary Election Results in Ireland, 1801-1922, Dublin, Royal Irish Academy, 1978

Parliament of the United Kingdom
Preceded by Keyes O'Clery; Sir George Bowyer, Bt	Member of Parliament for County Wexford; 1880 – 1883; With: John Barry	Succeeded by John Barry; John Francis Small
New constituency County Wicklow divided	Member of Parliament for West Wicklow; 1885 – 1892	Succeeded by James O'Connor
