= Moya Llewelyn Davies =

Irish translator and Fenian

Moya Llewelyn Davies, born Mary Elizabeth O'Connor, (25 March 1881 – 28 September 1943) was an Irish Republican activist during the Irish War of Independence and a Gaelic scholar.

== Childhood ==
Davies was one of five children of Irish Republican Brotherhood (IRB) Supreme Council member and later MP James O'Connor. He was IRB treasurer in 1870 and party to the discussions on the New Departure, a collaboration between constitutional and physical force nationalists, the open and the secret movements. John O'Connor, his brother, Moya's uncle, was a leading member of the Supreme Council.

In 1890, when Moya's father was a journalist, Moya's mother Mary O’Connor, and four of her sisters – Annie, Aileen, Kathleen and Norah – died after eating contaminated mussels gathered on the seashore near where they lived in what became known as the Seapoint tragedy. Moya was violently ill, but survived.

== Marriage and children ==
Davies travelled to London after a falling out with her stepmother six years later. She found work as a civil servant and a paid speaker for the Liberal Party.

In 1910, she married lawyer Crompton Llewelyn Davies, a brother of Arthur Llewelyn Davies and uncle of the boys who inspired the creation of Peter Pan. They had two children: Richard and Catherine.

Moya raised funds for Roger Casement's legal defence and later lobbied for the death sentence to be commuted. She was saluted as one of the 'fond ones' in a letter from Ruari, Roger Casement, to Margaret Gavan Duffy on the eve of his execution in Pentonville prison, 3 August 1916.

== Irish War of Independence ==
Following the Easter Rising, Davies took her two children to Ireland and bought Furry Park, a crumbling mansion near Dublin. She collaborated with Michael Collins during the War of Independence and her home in Clontarf became one of Collins' many safe houses as he directed the war. Davies was arrested and imprisoned in 1920.

Collins also stayed at her Portmarnock house, using it as a safe house.

== Rumoured affair ==
Davies said in later life that she and Collins had been lovers, but the historian Peter Hart claimed she was a stalker. It has been suggested that Michael Collins was the father of her son Richard. Historian Meda Ryan denies this saying "Letters from him and a phonecall confirmed that he was born 24 December 1912, before his mother met Collins."

Historian Tim Pat Coogan in his book Michael Collins says that Davies claimed on the night that Collins learned that Éamon de Valera would reject the Anglo-Irish Treaty "he was so distressed that I gave myself to him". Coogan refuses to give a source and in the footnotes he says "Confidential source".

== Literary work ==
Davies made a lasting contribution to Irish literature with a translation, with George Thomson, of the Muiris Ó Súilleabháin book Fiche Bliain ag Fás as Twenty Years a-Growing. She is thought to have helped Collins write his book The Path to Freedom.

She died of cancer in Wicklow on 28 September 1943.
