= South Wexford =

UK Parliamentary constituency from 1885 to 1922 in Ireland

- Former county constituency for the House of Commons

1885–1922
- Seats: 1
- Created from: County Wexford; New Ross; Wexford
- Replaced by: Wexford

South Wexford was a UK Parliament constituency in Ireland, returning one Member of Parliament from 1885 to 1922.

Prior to 1885 the area was part of the County Wexford constituency. From 1922, on the establishment of the Irish Free State, the area was not represented in the UK Parliament.

== Boundaries ==
This constituency was created under the Redistribution of Seats Act 1885 and comprised the southern part of County Wexford. Under the Redistribution of Seats (Ireland) Act 1918, the boundary was expanded to include the part of New Ross urban district transferred from County Kilkenny under the Local Government (Ireland) Act 1898.

1885–1918: The baronies of Bargy, Forth and Shelburne, and those parts of the baronies of Bantry and Shelmaliere West not included in the constituency of North Wexford.

1918–1922: The existing South Wexford constituency together with that part of the existing South Kilkenny constituency contained within the administrative county of Wexford.

== Members of Parliament ==
Election	Member	Party
1885	John Barry	Nationalist
1890	John Barry	Anti-Parnellite
1893	Peter Ffrench	Anti-Parnellite
1900	Peter Ffrench	Nationalist
1918	James Ryan	Sinn Féin
1922	Constituency abolished	

== Elections ==
=== Elections in the 1880s ===
1885 general election: South Wexford
Party	Candidate	Votes	%	±%
Irish Parliamentary	John Barry	Unopposed		
Registered electors		9,577		
Irish Parliamentary win (new seat)				

1886 general election: South Wexford
Party	Candidate	Votes	%	±%
Irish Parliamentary	John Barry	Unopposed		
Registered electors		9,577		
Irish Parliamentary hold				

=== Elections in the 1890s ===
1892 general election: South Wexford
Party	Candidate	Votes	%	±%
Irish National Federation	John Barry	5,104	90.2	N/A
Liberal Unionist	Samuel Barrett-Hamilton	554	9.8	New
Majority		4,550	80.4	N/A
Turnout		5,658	57.3	N/A
Registered electors		9,872		
Irish National Federation gain from Irish Parliamentary		Swing	N/A	

Barry resigns, prompting a by-election.

By-election, 1893: South Wexford
Party	Candidate	Votes	%	±%
Irish National Federation	Peter Ffrench	Unopposed		
Registered electors		9,550		
Irish National Federation hold				

1895 general election: South Wexford
Party	Candidate	Votes	%	±%
Irish National Federation	Peter Ffrench	Unopposed		
Registered electors		8,969		
Irish National Federation hold				

=== Elections in the 1900s ===
1900 general election: South Wexford
Party	Candidate	Votes	%	±%
Irish Parliamentary	Peter Ffrench	Unopposed		
Registered electors		9,183		
Irish Parliamentary hold				

1906 general election: South Wexford
Party	Candidate	Votes	%	±%
Irish Parliamentary	Peter Ffrench	Unopposed		
Registered electors		8,602		
Irish Parliamentary hold				

=== Elections in the 1910s ===
January 1910 general election: South Wexford
Party	Candidate	Votes	%	±%
Irish Parliamentary	Peter Ffrench	Unopposed		
Registered electors		8,557		
Irish Parliamentary hold				

December 1910 general election: South Wexford
Party	Candidate	Votes	%	±%
Irish Parliamentary	Peter Ffrench	3,578	75.5	N/A
All-for-Ireland	John Cummins	1,164	24.5	New
Majority		2,414	51.0	N/A
Turnout		4,742	55.4	N/A
Registered electors		8,557		
Irish Parliamentary hold		Swing	N/A	

1918 general election: South Wexford
Party	Candidate	Votes	%	±%
Sinn Féin	James Ryan	8,729	51.5	New
Irish Parliamentary	Peter Ffrench	8,211	48.5	−27.0
Majority		518	3.0	N/A
Turnout		16,940	73.1	+17.7
Registered electors		23,168		
Sinn Féin gain from Irish Parliamentary		Swing		
