= West Wicklow =

Former parliamentary constituency in the United Kingdom

- Former county constituency for the House of Commons

1885–1922
- Seats: 1
- Created from: County Wicklow
- Replaced by: Kildare–Wicklow

West Wicklow, a division of County Wicklow, was a parliamentary constituency in Ireland, represented in the Parliament of the United Kingdom. From 1885 to 1922 it returned one Member of Parliament (MP) to the House of Commons of the United Kingdom of Great Britain and Ireland.

Until the 1885 general election the area was part of the County Wicklow constituency. From 1922, on the establishment of the Irish Free State, it was not represented in the UK Parliament.

== Boundaries ==
This constituency comprised the western part of County Wicklow.

1885–1922: The baronies of Ballinacor South, Shillelagh, Talbotstown Lower and Talbotstown higher, and that part of the barony of Ballinacor North not contained within the constituency of East Wicklow.

== United Kingdom Parliament or Dáil Éireann 1918–1922 ==
The 1918 general election (in Ireland) was, in British law, to fill the 105 Irish seats in the UK House of Commons for the 31st United Kingdom Parliament. In practice, only the non-Sinn Féin MPs took their seats at Westminster. This Parliament first met on 4 February 1919, and was dissolved on 26 October 1922. At its dissolution, the Parliamentary seats in the twenty six counties comprising the Irish Free State were abolished.

Irish Republicans regard the 1918 election as being to the First Dáil Éireann. In practice, only the Sinn Féin Members of Parliament became Teachtaí Dála in the new revolutionary assembly. See list of members of the 1st Dáil. The initial meeting of the First Dáil was on 21 January 1919 and it last met on 10 May 1921.

From the 1922 United Kingdom general election, only the six counties of Northern Ireland were represented in Parliament.

For links to all other constituencies see List of UK Parliament Constituencies in Ireland and Northern Ireland.

== Members of Parliament ==
Election	Member	Party
1885	Garrett Byrne	Nationalist
1892	James O'Connor	Irish National Federation (Anti-Parnellite)
1900	James O'Connor	Nationalist
1910	Edward Peter O'Kelly	Nationalist
1914	John Thomas Donovan	Nationalist
1918	Robert Barton	Sinn Féin
1922	UK constituency abolished	

== Elections ==
=== Elections in the 1880s ===
1885 general election: West Wicklow
Party	Candidate	Votes	%	±%
Irish Parliamentary	Garrett Byrne	3,721	81.0	
Irish Conservative	William Wentworth Fitzwilliam Dick	871	19.0	
Majority		2,850	62.0	
Turnout		4,592	87.9	
Registered electors		5,226		
Irish Parliamentary win (new seat)				

1886 general election: West Wicklow
Party	Candidate	Votes	%	±%
Irish Parliamentary	Garrett Byrne	3,531	80.5	−0.5
Irish Conservative	William Wentworth Fitzwilliam Dick	856	19.5	+0.5
Majority		2,675	61.0	−1.0
Turnout		4,387	83.9	−4.0
Registered electors		5,226		
Irish Parliamentary hold		Swing	−0.5	

=== Elections in the 1890s ===
1892 general election: West Wicklow
Party	Candidate	Votes	%	±%
Irish National Federation	James O'Connor	2,582	66.6	N/A
Liberal Unionist	Robert Joseph Pratt Saunders	748	19.3	−0.2
Irish National League	John Howard Parnell	546	14.1	N/A
Majority		1,834	47.3	N/A
Turnout		3,876	79.9	−4.0
Registered electors		4,853		
Irish National Federation gain from Irish Parliamentary		Swing		

1895 general election: West Wicklow
Party	Candidate	Votes	%	±%
Irish National Federation	James O'Connor	Unopposed		
Registered electors		4,576		
Irish National Federation hold				

=== Elections in the 1900s ===
1900 general election: West Wicklow
Party	Candidate	Votes	%	±%
Irish Parliamentary	James O'Connor	Unopposed		
Registered electors		4,671		
Irish Parliamentary hold				

1906 general election: West Wicklow
Party	Candidate	Votes	%	±%
Irish Parliamentary	James O'Connor	Unopposed		
Registered electors		4,406		
Irish Parliamentary hold				

=== Elections in the 1910s ===
January 1910 general election: West Wicklow
Party	Candidate	Votes	%	±%
Irish Parliamentary	James O'Connor	Unopposed		
Registered electors		4,417		
Irish Parliamentary hold				

O'Connor dies, causing a by-election.

By-election, 1910: West Wicklow
Party	Candidate	Votes	%	±%
Irish Parliamentary	Edward Peter O'Kelly	Unopposed		
Registered electors		4,417		
Irish Parliamentary hold				

December 1910 general election: West Wicklow
Party	Candidate	Votes	%	±%
Irish Parliamentary	Edward Peter O'Kelly	Unopposed		
Registered electors		4,417		
Irish Parliamentary hold				

O'Kelly's death causes a by-election.

By-election, 1914: West Wicklow
Party	Candidate	Votes	%	±%
Irish Parliamentary	John Thomas Donovan	Unopposed		
Registered electors		4,489		
Irish Parliamentary hold				

1918 general election: West Wicklow
Party	Candidate	Votes	%	±%
Sinn Féin	Robert Barton	6,239	82.0	New
Irish Parliamentary	Pierce Charles de Lacy O'Mahony	1,370	18.0	N/A
Majority		4,869	64.0	N/A
Turnout		7,609	65.2	N/A
Registered electors		11,673		
Sinn Féin gain from Irish Parliamentary		Swing	N/A	
