= John George (lawyer) =

Irish politician and judge

John George PC, QC (18 November 1804 – 15 December 1871) was an Irish politician and judge.

== Background ==
George was born in Dublin, the eldest son of John George (died 1837), of Dublin, a merchant (who later became a landowner in County Wexford), by Emily Jane Fox, daughter of Richard Fox. He was educated at Trinity College Dublin. Trinity College Dublin conferred on him the degrees of BA in 1823, and MA in 1826.

== Legal and judicial career ==
George was called to the Irish Bar at the King's Inns. On 16 May 1827, he was also called to the English bar at Gray's Inn, London. Having returned to Ireland, he was appointed a Queen's Counsel on 2 November 1844. George became a Bencher of King's Inns in 1849. He sat as one of the two Members of Parliament (MPs) for County Wexford (a county with which his family had an enduring link) from 1852 to 1857 and from 1859 to 1866 and served as Solicitor-General for Ireland under Lord Derby from February to July 1859. He became a member of the Irish Privy Council in 1866, and was appointed a judge of the Court of Queen's Bench, Ireland, in November of the same year, a post which he held until his death. As a judge, he was highly esteemed, with a reputation for impartiality, independence and efficiency. In manner, he was noted for patience and dignity.

== Personal life ==
George married, first, in 1832, Susan Rosanna, daughter of Isaac Matthew D'Olier of Collignes, County Dublin and Margaret Rutherford – she died in 1847; and secondly, on 10 August 1848, Mary, eldest daughter of Major Christopher L'Estrange Carleton of Market Hill, County Fermanagh and Jane Jackson, daughter of George Jackson and Maria Rutledge. He died at 45 Fitzwilliam Square, Dublin, on 15 December 1871 aged 67. By his first wife, he had at least three children who survived infancy: John, Richard and Emily. His widow died in 1897.

George, who had inherited property in County Wexford from his father, built Cahore House, Clonevan in about 1840. It remained in the family for several generations, and still exists, though it is presently unoccupied.

== Arms ==
Coat of arms of John George

Crest
A falcon as in the arms.
Escutcheon
Or on a fess Gules three bezants between three falcons Proper.

Parliament of the United Kingdom
Preceded by James Fagan; Hamilton Knox Grogan Morgan	Member of Parliament for County Wexford; 1852–1857; With: Patrick McMahon	Succeeded by Patrick McMahon; John Hatchell
Preceded by Patrick McMahon; John Hatchell	Member of Parliament for County Wexford; 1859–1866; With: Patrick McMahon 1859–1865; Sir James Power, Bt 1865–1866	Succeeded by Sir James Power, Bt; Arthur MacMurrough Kavanagh
Legal offices
Preceded by Edmund Hayes	Solicitor-General for Ireland; February–July 1859	Succeeded by Rickard Deasy
