= John Hatchell (1825–1902) =

Member of Parliament for County Wexford
- In office 10 March 1857 – 16 May 1859 Serving with Patrick McMahon
- Preceded by: Patrick McMahon; John George
- Succeeded by: Patrick McMahon; John George

Personal details
- Born: 1825
- Died: 7 August 1902 (aged 76–77)
- Party: Liberal/Whig

John Hatchell (1825 – 7 August 1902) was an Irish Liberal and Whig politician.

He grew up in Terenure, County Dublin. He was the son of John Hatchell of Fortfield House, Terenure, and Elizabeth Waddy, daughter of Richard Waddy of Clougheast Castle. His father was a leading politician and barrister who served as Attorney General for Ireland. Both his parents came from prominent landowning families in County Wexford. His sister Mary married as his second wife Maziere Brady, Lord Chancellor of Ireland. Another sister Penelope married John Perrin, one of the many sons of the eminent judge Louis Perrin and was the mother of the artist Mary Perrin.

Hatchell was elected as a Whig Member of Parliament (MP) for County Wexford at the 1857 general election but, standing as a Liberal in 1857, lost the seat at the next election in 1859. Shortly afterwards he was appointed secretary to the Lord Lieutenant of Ireland.

Parliament of the United Kingdom
Preceded by Patrick McMahon; John George	Member of Parliament for County Wexford; 1857–1859; With: Patrick McMahon	Succeeded by Patrick McMahon; John George
