= Sir John Talbot Power, 3rd Baronet =

Irish politician (1845–1901)

Sir John Talbot Power Bt

Member of Parliament for County Wexford
- In office 24 November 1868 – 23 February 1874 Serving with Matthew Peter D'Arcy
- Preceded by: James Power; Arthur MacMurrough Kavanagh
- Succeeded by: George Bowyer; Keyes O'Clery

Personal details
- Born: 2 May 1845
- Died: 4 December 1901 (aged 56)
- Party: Liberal
- Spouse: Frances Emma Segrave (m. 1876)
- Children: Two, including James Douglas Talbot Power
- Parent(s): James Power; Jane Ann Eliza Talbot

Sir John Talbot Power, 3rd Baronet (2 May 1845 – 4 December 1901) was an Irish Liberal politician.

Talbot Power was the son of former County Wexford MP and Governor of the Bank of Ireland James Power and Jane Ann Eliza (née Talbot). In 1876, he married Frances Emma Segrave, daughter of Henry Segrave, and they had at least two children: James Douglas Talbot Power and Eileen Maréli.

Talbot Power was elected MP as a Liberal candidate for County Wexford in the 1868 general election and held the seat until 1874 when he was defeated.

Talbot Power succeeded as second baronet in 1877 upon the death of his father. In 1880, he was High Sheriff of Wexford and, upon his death, the baronetcy passed to his son.

Parliament of the United Kingdom
Preceded by James Power; Arthur MacMurrough Kavanagh	Member of Parliament for County Wexford; 1868 – 1874; With: Matthew Peter D'Arcy	Succeeded by George Bowyer; Keyes O'Clery
Baronetage of the United Kingdom
Preceded by James Power	Baronet (of Edermine); 1877–1901	Succeeded by James Douglas Talbot Power
