= Henry Lambert (MP) =

Irish politician (1786–1861)

Henry Lambert (1 September 1786 – 20 October 1861) was an Irish Member of Parliament.

Living at Carnagh, in County Wexford, Lambert stood for the Whigs in County Wexford at the 1831 UK general election, winning the seat. He argued that Parliamentary representation of Ireland should be on the same basis as in England, and that the UK Parliament should meet in Dublin every third year.

Lambert held his seat at the 1832 UK general election, then stood down in 1835. He later became a magistrate and deputy lieutenant of Wexford. He stood unsuccessfully as a Conservative Party candidate in New Ross at the 1852 UK general election.

He was the author of a book, A Memoir of Ireland in 1850 by an ex M.P..

Parliament of the United Kingdom
| Preceded by George Arthur Annesley; Arthur Chichester | Member of Parliament for County Wexford; 1831–1835; With: Arthur Chichester (1831–1832); Robert Carew (1832–1834); Cadwallader Waddy (1834–1835) | Succeeded by John Maher; James Power |
