= Robert Barton =

Irish politician (1881–1975)

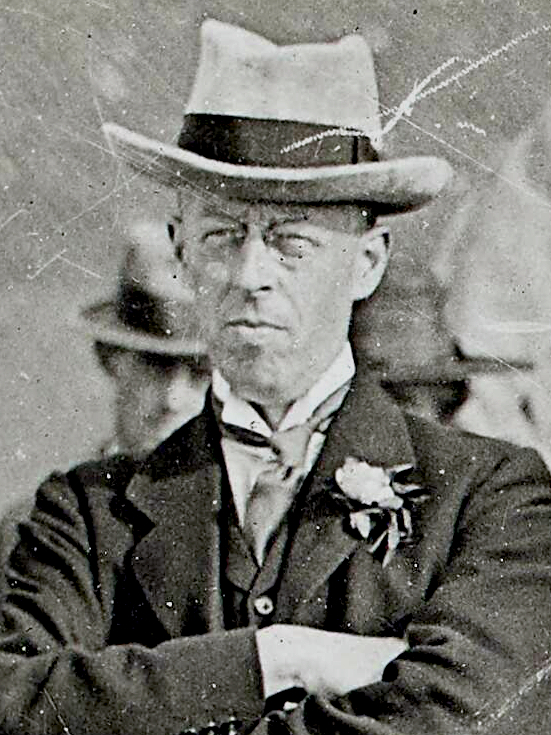
- Barton in 1921

Minister for Economic Affairs
- In office 26 August 1921 – 9 January 1922
- Preceded by: New office
- Succeeded by: Kevin O'Higgins

Director of Agriculture
- In office 2 April 1919 – 26 August 1921
- Preceded by: New office
- Succeeded by: Art O'Connor

Teachta Dála
- In office May 1921 – June 1923
- Constituency: Kildare–Wicklow
- In office December 1918 – May 1921
- Constituency: Wicklow West

Personal details
- Born: Robert Childers Barton; 14 March 1881 Annamoe, County Wicklow, Ireland
- Died: 10 August 1975 (aged 94) Annamoe, County Wicklow, Ireland
- Party: Sinn Féin
- Spouse: Rachel Warren (m. 1951; died 1972)
- Relatives: Erskine Childers (cousin)
- Education: Christ Church, Oxford
- Occupation: Landowner

Robert Childers Barton (14 March 1881 – 10 August 1975) was an Anglo-Irish politician, Irish nationalist and farmer who participated in the negotiations leading up to the signature of the Anglo-Irish Treaty. His father was Charles William Barton and his mother was Agnes Alexandra Frances Childers. His wife was Rachel Warren of Boston, daughter of Fiske Warren. His double first cousin and close friend was Erskine Childers.

== Early life ==
He was born in County Wicklow into a wealthy Irish Protestant land-owning family; namely of Glendalough House. Educated in England at Rugby and Oxford, he became an officer in the Royal Dublin Fusiliers on the outbreak of World War I. He was stationed in Dublin during the 1916 Easter Rising and came into contact with many of its imprisoned leaders in the aftermath while on duty at Richmond Barracks. He resigned his commission in protest at the heavy-handed British government suppression of the revolt. He then joined the Irish Republican Brotherhood.

=== Family ===
Charles William Barton (father) was born on 13 July 1836. He married Agnes Alexandra Frances Childers, daughter of Rev. Canon Charles Childers, on 26 October 1876. He died on 3 October 1890, aged 54. Robert's two younger brothers, Erskine and Thomas, died in the British Army during World War I.

== Politics ==
At the 1918 general election to the British House of Commons Barton was elected as the Sinn Féin member for West Wicklow. In common with all Sinn Féin members, he boycotted the Westminster parliament and sat instead in Dáil Éireann (the First Dáil). Arrested in February 1919 for sedition, he escaped from Mountjoy Prison on St. Patrick's Day (leaving a note to the governor explaining that, owing to the discomfort of his cell, the occupant felt compelled to leave, and requesting the governor to keep his luggage until he sent for it). He was appointed as Director of Agriculture in the Dáil Ministry in April 1919. He was recaptured in January 1920 and sentenced to three years' imprisonment, but was released under the general amnesty of July 1921.

In May of that year, prior to his release, he was elected as a Sinn Féin member for Kildare–Wicklow in the 1921 Irish election to the House of Commons of Southern Ireland. Once again all Sinn Féin members boycotted this parliament, sitting as the Second Dáil. In August 1921, he was appointed to cabinet as Secretary for Economic Affairs.

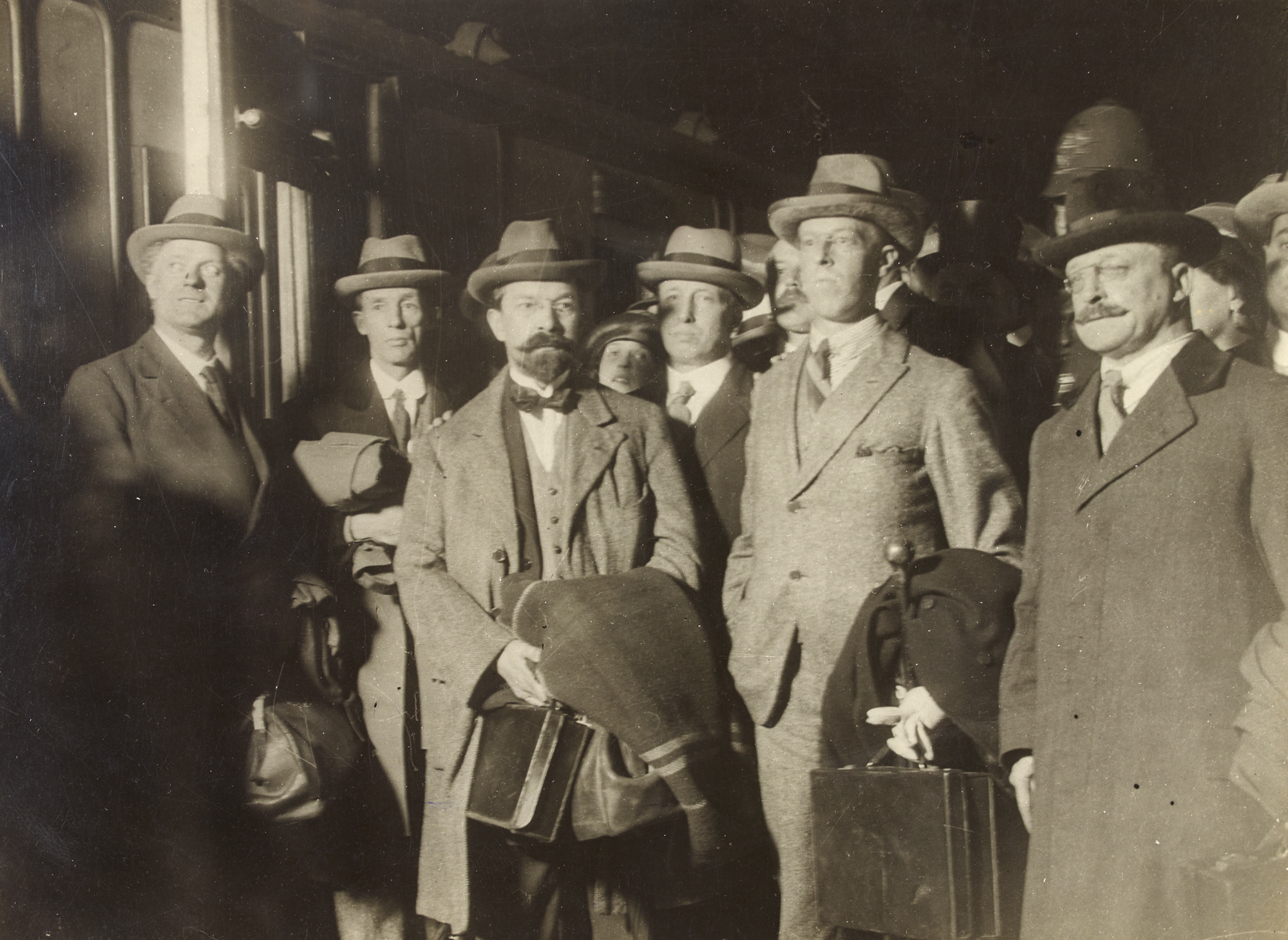
Barton together with other members of the negotiation team (including Childers and Griffith) in December 1921

Barton was one of the Irish plenipotentiaries to travel to London for the Anglo-Irish Treaty negotiations. His cousin was a secretary to the delegation. Barton reluctantly signed the Treaty on 6 December 1921, defending it "as the lesser of two outrages forced upon me and between which I had to choose".

Although he had signed the Treaty and voted for it in the Dáil, he stood for election in June 1922 for Anti-Treaty Sinn Féin, the only TD who had voted for the Treaty to do so, and won a seat in the 3rd Dáil. In common with other Anti-Treaty TDs, he did not take his seat. In October 1922 he was appointed Minister for Economic Affairs in de Valera's "Emergency Government", a shadow government in opposition to the Provisional Government and later to the Executive Council of the Irish Free State. Barton's memoir of this period was completed in 1954, and can be seen on the Bureau of Military History website. He was arrested and interned for most of the war at the Curragh Camp.

Barton was defeated at the 1923 general election, and retired from politics in favour of the law. He practiced as a barrister, and later became a judge. He was chairman of the Agricultural Credit Corporation from 1934 to 1954. Barton died at home in County Wicklow on 10 August 1975, at the age of 94, the last surviving signatory of the Anglo-Irish Treaty. Éamon de Valera died only nineteen days later, on 29 August 1975.

== Interview ==
In 1969, RTÉ Television interviewed Barton, alongside Ernest Blythe and James Ryan, about the 1918 general election.

== Glendalough House ==
Glendalough House, run by Barton for over 70 years until his death, is still considered one of Ireland's most notable properties, alongside nearby Powerscourt Estate. The house was the center of numerous political meetings and gatherings from 1910 to 1922. It's also been featured as a location in many large Hollywood films including Saving Private Ryan and Braveheart.

Barton's grandfather Thomas Johnston Barton, who acquired Glendalough House in 1838, was a younger son of Hugh Barton, owner of the Langoa Barton and Léoville Barton vineyards in France and co-founder of the Bordeaux wine house of Barton & Guestier. The vineyards are now owned by Lilian Barton, a descendant of Hugh Barton's eldest son, and she and her husband Michel Sartorius added Château Mauvesin Barton to these domaines in 2011.

Parliament of the United Kingdom
Preceded by John Donovan	Member of Parliament for Wicklow West; 1918–1922	Constituency abolished
Oireachtas
New constituency	Teachta Dála for West Wicklow; 1918–1921	Constituency abolished

Dáil	Election	Deputy (Party)	Deputy (Party)	Deputy (Party)	Deputy (Party)	Deputy (Party)
2nd	1921	Erskine Childers (SF)	Domhnall Ua Buachalla (SF)	Robert Barton (SF)	Christopher Byrne (SF)	Art O'Connor (SF)
3rd	1922	Hugh Colohan (Lab)	James Everett (Lab)	Robert Barton (AT-SF)	Christopher Byrne (PT-SF)	Richard Wilson (FP)
4th	1923	Constituency abolished. See Kildare and Wicklow				
