= Keyes O'Clery =

Count Patrick Keyes O'Clery, The O'Clery (1849 – 23 May 1913), was a soldier and barrister, he was also Home Rule M.P. for County Wexford.

Patrick Keyes O'Clery was the son of John Walsh O'Clery, The O'Clery. He was born near Kilfinane in County Limerick. He received his secondary education at St Munchin's College and later attended Trinity College Dublin. He was called to the bar by the Middle Temple in 1874.

Keyes O'Clery joined the Papal Zouaves and participated in the defence of the Papal States. He was present at the defeat of the Garabaldian army at the Battle of Mentana. He later participated in the defence of Rome when it fell to the nationalist forces. For this The O'Clery received the Papal Orders of St. Gregory (Military Cross) and of Pius IX. The Order of St Gregory also conferred upon him the title of chevalier.

Keyes O'Clery served as Home Rule M.P. from 1874 to 1880. In the 1874 election he took the second seat beating out the Liberal and Conservative candidates. At the general election of 1880, although he was backed by the Catholic clergy, he was defeated by the Parnellite candidate Garrett Byrne. During the campaign, there was a serious outbreak of violence at a meeting at Enniscorthy on Easter Sunday, 28 March 1880, in which Parnell himself was physically attacked. In the election the following month, Byrne was elected by a majority of over 2,000.

In 1903, he was created a Count by Pope Leo XIII. He was also a Private Chamberlain at the Vatican Court and a Knight Grand Cross of the Spanish Order of Isabella the Catholic. By coincidence, Sir George Bowyer, Bt., with whom he shared the representation for Co. Wexford, also had a number of Papal decorations.

Keyes O'Clery wrote two books about Italy.

He died at Twyford Abbey near Ealing.

His widow, Katherine Countess O'Clery, died aged 77 on 4 August 1919 at St. John's Villa, St. Leonards-on-Sea.

Parliament of the United Kingdom
Preceded by Matthew Peter D'Arcy; John Talbot Power	Member of Parliament for County Wexford; 1874 – 1880; With: Sir George Bowyer, Bt	Succeeded by John Barry; Garrett Michael Byrne
