= Matthew Peter D'Arcy =

Irish Liberal politician (1821-1889)

Member of Parliament for County Wexford
- In office 24 November 1868 – 23 February 1874 Serving with John Talbot Power
- Preceded by: James Power; Arthur MacMurrough Kavanagh
- Succeeded by: George Bowyer; Keyes O'Clery

Personal details
- Born: 18 June 1821
- Died: 28 November 1889 (aged 68)
- Party: Liberal
- Spouse(s): Christina Margaret Daly (m. 1860; div. 1887) Emma Knaresborough (m. 1853; died 1858)
- Children: Nine
- Parent(s): John D'Arcy; Eliza Selgrave
- Education: Trinity College, Dublin

Matthew Peter D'Arcy (18 June 1821 – 28 November 1889) was an Irish Liberal politician.

== Family and early life ==
D'Arcy was the son of John and Eliza (née Selgrave) D'Arcy. After receiving a MA from Trinity College, Dublin, he first married Emma Knaresborough, daughter of William and Maria (née Corballis) Knaresborough in 1853, and they had three children: John Francis Aloysius (1854–1874); William Matthew Joseph (born 1855); and James Frederick Herbert (1857–1918).

After Emma's death in 1858, he remarried to Christina Margaret Daly, daughter of James Peter and Margaret (née Dolphin) Daly, in 1860. Before they divorced in 1887, they had six children: Emma Teresa Mary; Mary Louisa Christina; Margaret Rita Mary (1861–1915); Eliza Mary (1863–1926); Christina Mary (1867–1931); and Matthew Stephen Rodolph (1868–1901).

== Political career ==
D'Arcy was elected at the 1868 general election as one of the two Members of Parliament (MPs) for County Wexford. He held the seat until 1874 when he stood down.

== Other activities ==
D'Arcy was also a Justice of the Peace and a Deputy Lieutenant and, in 1872, a High Sheriff of Dublin City.

Parliament of the United Kingdom
Preceded by James Power; Arthur MacMurrough Kavanagh	Member of Parliament for County Wexford; 1868 – 1874; With: John Talbot Power	Succeeded by George Bowyer; Keyes O'Clery
