= James O'Connor (Wicklow politician) =

Irish politician

James O'Connor (1836 – 12 March 1910) was an Irish journalist and nationalist politician who sat in the House of Commons of the United Kingdom as a Member of Parliament (MP) from 1892 to 1910, first for the anti-Parnellite Irish National Federation and then (from 1900) for the re-united Irish Parliamentary Party (IPP).

== IRB ==
O'Connor was born in the Glen of Imaal, County Wicklow.

In 1863 or thereabouts he was recruited by Jeremiah O'Donovan Rossa, business manager of the Irish Republican Brotherhood newspaper, The Irish People, as his assistant manager and book-keeper. His younger brother John acted as office messenger and later devoted his entire adult life to secret work for the IRB. James O'Connor was responsible for the commercial side of the paper during Rossa's prolonged absences.

He was imprisoned from 1865 onwards along with other Fenians who worked on the paper and was released with them from Portland prison on 4 March 1869. He then found employment on The Irishman. By 1870, he was treasurer of the IRB Supreme Council. In 1869 he was present at the talks in Moore Hall and the House of Commons to discuss a New Departure. Constitutional and physical force Nationalists would work together and separately to promote an independent Ireland. In 1878, he acted as an intermediary between the American Fenians and Charles Stewart Parnell.

== Political career ==
He was elected as the MP for West Wicklow at the general election in July 1892. He was re-elected as anti-Parnellite in 1895, and as an IPP candidate in 1900, 1906 and January 1910, and died in office in March 1910, aged 74.

While an MP in 1907, he helped to carry the coffin at the funeral of the old Fenian John O'Leary.

== Family ==
In 1890, O'Connor's wife Mary and four of his daughters – Annie, Aileen, Kathleen and Norah – died after eating poisoned mussels in what became known as the Seapoint tragedy. His other daughter Moya Llewelyn Davies only ate a few and was violently ill, but survived. Moya was a close ally of Michael Collins during the War of Independence.

He was married a second time, in 1892 to Jane McBride, with whom he had a daughter.

Parliament of the United Kingdom
Preceded by Garrett Byrne	Member of Parliament for West Wicklow; 1892 – 1910	Succeeded by Edward Peter O'Kelly
