= Joseph Foley =

Joseph William Foley

Member of Parliament for New Ross
- In office 1880–1881
- Preceded by: Charles George Tottenham
- Succeeded by: John Redmond

Personal details
- Born: c. 1821

Joseph William Foley JP (born c. 1821) was an Irish solicitor from Dún Laoghaire, County Dublin who briefly became a nationalist politician.

His father William was from New Ross in County Wexford, and his mother Elizabeth Crawford was from Northumberland. He was educated at St Cuthbert's College in County Durham, and became a solicitor in 1841. He was also a justice of the peace for County Dublin. In 1865 he married Julia Cram, from Crofthouse in Northumberland.

Foley was elected at the 1880 general election as a Home Rule League Member of Parliament (MP) for New Ross, defeating the sitting Conservative MP Charles George Tottenham.

However, he resigned his seat in January 1881 by becoming Steward of the Manor of Northstead. The resulting by-election for his seat was won by the Home Rule candidate John Redmond, who later became leader of the Irish Parliamentary Party.

Parliament of the United Kingdom
Preceded by Charles George Tottenham	Member of Parliament for New Ross; 1880–1881	Succeeded by John Redmond
