= Fagin (surname) =

Fagin is a surname. Notable people with the name include:

- Betsy Fagin (born 1972), American poet
- Claire Fagin (1926–2024), American nurse, educator, academic and interim university president
- Dan Fagin (born 1963), American journalist
- Joe Fagin (1940–2023), British pop singer-songwriter
- Joe Fagin (baseball), American Major League Baseball catcher in 1895
- Larry Fagin (1937 – 2017), American poet, editor, publisher, and teacher
- Lucas Fagin (born 1980), Argentinian composer
- Ronald Fagin (born 1945), American mathematician and computer scientist

== See also ==
- Fagan, surname
- Fagen, surname
