= Louise Fagan =

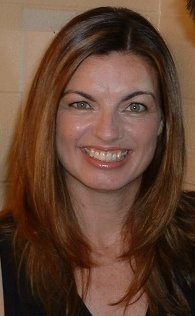
- Born: Patricia Louise Fagan; May 4 London, Ontario
- Occupations: Director, Producer

Patricia Louise Fagan is a producer and director specializing in creative development of artists, productions and arts organizations. She is the founder of Louise Fagan Productions, located in Canada and the United States.

== Personal life ==
Born in London, Ontario, raised in Listowel Ontario, Fagan is the daughter of choral conductor Gerald Fagan and pianist/arts manager Marlene Fagan. She obtained a degree in English and Dramatic Literature from the University of Western Ontario. After graduation, she became an independent theatre producer and director, working on musical story-telling, theatre, television and film. Fagan has two grown children. In 2013 married Michael Hew and now lives in the United States.

== Career ==
Fagan has worked on a number of high-profile projects, including producing and directing the opening and closing ceremonies for the 2001 Canada Summer Games. In the summer of 2002, she was the show co-ordinator for The Way of the Cross, which celebrated the Pope's visit to Toronto. She studio produced the orchestral recording River, commissioned by Wellspring Cancer Support Centre, to mirror the emotional journey of a cancer patient and was executive producer for the soundtrack to Jazzabel, produced by legendary Canadian producer Jack Richardson. Other most recent CD releases include Noted!, In Good Company and "Northern Daughter (Donna Creighton).

Fagan's early theater directing credits include the Vagina Monologues, Hearts Made Great and The World Awaits. She owns her own film production company, Phat Puppy Productions, and co-founded Femme Fatale, a London-based theatre company. Femme Fatale's production of one-woman shows, titled Portraits (featured in the February 2006 issue of O, The Oprah Magazine), opened in 2006 with shows at The National Museum of Women in the Arts, Washington, DC. Additional performances took place at Urban Stages, New York City, and The University of the South, Sewanee, Tennessee. Shows in the production directed by Fagan included Jazzabel, The Shimmering Verge (with Molly Peacock) and Nona. Fagan also directed the short film Father's Touch, an adaptation of the first chapter of a book of the same name by Donald D'Haene. The film won a top 50 placement in the Kevin Spacey conceived, worldwide Online film festival, Triggerstreet.

Fagan is the Creative Director of "Under an African Sky", held each December, featuring UN Envoy to Africa Stephen Lewis, a fundraiser in support of the Stephen Lewis Foundation to combat AIDS in Africa. She is also the Artistic Producer for the "In Good Company" festival, a month long, multi-arts festival in London.

In 2008, Fagan was named President of Goodnight Angel Productions, a not-for-profit corporation based in New York, dedicated to outfitting pediatric hospital beds worldwide with digital music capabilities, in order to provide hospitalized children with recorded stories and lullabies. She also composed the score for the full-length feature, The Likes of Us. In 2009, she was the Creative Director for the Olympic Torch Relay Celebration in Victoria Park in London.In 2011 Fagan became the Executive Producer of the Bach Music Festival of Canada, a biennial international festival in southern Ontario honouring Johann Sebastian Bach

In 2012 Louise collaborated with Canadian author Susan Swan on the development of Heroines of the Sexual Gothic. This production included the musical talents of The Billie Hollies, the all girl opera noir quartet. The show was performed in Toronto and London. Currently, Louise is the Creative Producer of Ada: A Contemporary Opera. "Ada" is an opera about Ada Byron, Countess of Lovelace (1815-1852,) a mathematician and scientist. She was the daughter of the poet Lord Byron and Annabella Milbanke.She is often cited as ‘the world's first computer programmer.’ In 2017 Louise was named the South Carolina Career Woman of the Year by the BPWSC.
