= Jermaine Fagan =

- Also known as: Prince
- Born: Jermaine Fagan; 24 September 1978 (age 47)
- Origin: St. Thomas, Jamaica
- Genres: Reggae, Roots Reggae
- Labels: Fagan Media

Jermaine Christopher Fagan, also known as Prince (born 24 September 1978), is a reggae musician. He was born in Saint Thomas, Jamaica and raised in Portmore.

== Biography ==
He migrated to the United States in 1999 after completing sixth form at Kingston College. He also attended Temple University in Philadelphia, Pa where he was a part of a band called "The Black Star Family". The band however, dissolved in 2004, which prompted Jermaine to become a solo act and start working on his first album "More 2 Life" The title track "More 2 Life" became a hit in Jamaica and was placed in the top ten charts for Irie FM (a prominent radio station in Jamaica) seven consecutive weeks in a row.

With two albums and a line of performances, Fagan is another conscious artist often compared to Damian Marley, emerging out of Jamaica in the early 1990s. "His influence to pursue a career in music comes from his consciousness of the World seeking solutions to problems such as poverty, inequality and injustice" according to an interview with Caribbean Vibes magazine. He has performed at several stage shows including the annual Yam Festival in Philadelphia and the annual Reggae Festival in New Jersey.

== Albums ==
- Cool Prince (2020)
- Just A Simple Man (2007)
- More 2 Life (2005)
