= Gerald Fagan =

Gerald Fagan CM OOnt
- Born: Gerald Richard Fagan; 19 September 1939 (age 85); London, Ontario, Canada
- Known for: Conducting; composing; teaching

Gerald Richard Fagan CM OOnt (born 1939) is considered one of Canada's premier choral conductors. He is the former conductor and artistic director of Fanshawe Chorus London, The Gerald Fagan Singers, and the Concert Players Orchestra. He has been married to Marlene Fagan since 1961. They have five children: Leslie, Louise, Judy, Jennifer and Jonathon.

== Biography ==
Gerald Fagan was born in London, Ontario, on 19 September 1939. He received his earliest music training from the Sisters of St. Joseph at Sacred Heart Convent. He attended the University of Western Ontario and was graduated with a BA in music in 1961. He studied conducting with Robert Shaw, score analysis with Julius Herford (Indiana), vocal pedagogy with William Vennard (University of California), and diction with Madeline Marshall (Juilliard).

In his distinguished career, he has conducted choirs from Russia, South Africa, the United States, Poland, Taiwan and Argentina. Fagan has often been a judge for the Juno Awards, the CBC Choral Competition and was conductor of the 2001 Canada Summer Games Choir and Orchestra.

Fagan conducted Fanshawe Chorus London, The Gerald Fagan Singers, and the Concert Players Orchestra for 45 years, beginning in 1978 after completing a six-year teaching assignment as music teacher at Listowel District Secondary School in Listowel, Ontario. The two choirs twice won the Lieutenant Governor's Award for the Arts based on their artistic performances, fiscal responsibility and dedication to Canadian composers. While still together, the Gerald Fagan Singers traveled to ten countries starting in 1998, including England, Belgium, France, the Netherlands, Poland, Lithuania, Monaco, Spain, Czech Republic and Germany performing Canadian repertoire to new audiences.

Twice artistic director of the Ontario Youth Choir, Fagan was also the founding conductor of the Toronto Mendelssohn Youth Choir and his talents have led him to conduct all-province choirs in New Brunswick, Newfoundland and Labrador, Prince Edward Island, Ontario, Saskatchewan, Manitoba and Alberta. Presented with the 'Citizen's Medal' by President Adamkus of Lithuania, he has also been honoured by Conservatory Canada with an honorary licentiate and chosen to conduct the Fagan Singers at the Monserrat Monastery Pilgrimage in Spain, where they performed Pablo Casals choral repertoire. Gerald Fagan has performed as conductor with Maureen Forrester, Lois Marshall, Victor Borge, Ben Heppner, Thomas Paul, Roberta Peters, Janis Taylor, Gary Relyea, Leslie Fagan, Mark Du Bois, Mark Pedrotti, Darryl Edwards, Brian McIntosh and Mary Lou Fallis.

In 2011, Fagan co-founded and became the artistic director of the Bach Music Festival of Canada, a biennial event held in Exeter, Huron County, Ontario. In the festival, he conducts three performing ensembles - the Bach Festival Massed Choir, the Bach Festival Chamber Orchestra, and CHOR AMICA CHAMBER CHOIR. During his tenure at this position he has received the Presidents' Leadership Award from CHOIRS ONTARIO, the Citizen's Key to the municipality of South Huron and the Queen Elizabeth II Diamond Jubilee Medal. Together with his wife Marlene, he was inducted into the Don Wright Faculty of Music Wall of Fame at Western University. In 2011 Fagan was awarded Ontario's highest civilian honour, the Order of Ontario.

In 2016, Fagan was awarded the Order of Canada. The Order of Canada is one of the nation's highest civilian honours. It is given to recognize outstanding achievement and dedication to the community and service to the nation.

== Career highlights ==
1958 Gold Medalist Piano Performance – Western Ontario Conservatory of Music
1971 Two first prize awards at the Cork International and Dance Festival
1973 Memorial Award at Canadian Music Educators Convention
1978 Founding Conductor, Toronto Mendelssohn Youth Choir/Founding Conductor Gerald Fagan Singers
1976 Conductor, Ontario Youth Choir and Orchestra 1983 Founding Conductor, Concert Players Orchestra
1985 Gerald Fagan Singers Concert Tour, Newfoundland
1987 Appointed National Chair, Chamber Choirs of Canada by the Association of Canadian Choral Conductors
1989 One of three concert collaborations with Victor Borge
1994 Honored as Citizen of the Year by the City of London and for his contribution to the Arts
1995 Release of compact disc of Messiah – Handel, first all Canadian recording in 50 years
1996 Received Award of Distinction for contribution to choral music in Canada, awarded by the Ontario Choral Federation
1997 Guest Conductor, Newfoundland's Festival 500, conducted choirs from Russia, England, Africa, Cuba, Taiwan, Argentina, Scotland, United States and Canada
Received Honorary Licentiate of Music from Conservatory Canada
The Gerald Fagan National Voice Scholarship established by Conservatory Canada
1998 Concert tour of England, the Netherlands and Germany with Gerald Fagan Singers, promoting Canadian Music
2000 Conducted Gerald Fagan Singers in performances in the Netherlands, Germany
Conducted Gerald Fagan Singers in a private performance for President Adamkus, Royal Palace, Vilnius, Lithuania
Presented with Citizen's Medal from President Adamkus (Lithuania)
CD "Songs Abroad" released by Gerald Fagan Singers
2001 Conductor of the Chorus and Orchestra at the Canada Summer Games
Released the CD "Trillium Christmas, Music of Ontario Composers"
2002 Conducted worldwide Rolling Requiem performance of Mozart's Requiem honouring 9-11-2001 victims
2004 Saw the Third International Tour with Gerald Fagan Singers promoting Canadian music
They performed in Monaco at the Royal Chapel, in France at Pope's Palace Avignon on Bastille Day, in Spain at the Monserrat Monastery and in Barcelona at the Great Cathedral, Gaudi Church (They were the first choir to perform there)
2005 He was the Guest Conductor at the Festival 500, Newfoundland and Labrador and at the Rochester Oratorio Society
2006 Gerald became the Founder/ Executive Director of "In Good Company, A Celebration of Women in the Arts"
Artistic Director/Conductor of the Ontario Youth Choir
2007 Fourth International Tour with Gerald Fagan Singers
They performed in the Czech Republic at the Pilsen (Great Synagogue), Germany at the Dresden State Opera and at the German Trade Conference.
2011 Awarded the Order of Ontario
Co-founded the Bach Music Festival of Canada
Received the Presidents' Leadership Award from CHOIRS ONTARIO
2012 Awarded the Citizen's Key from the municipality of South Huron
Received the Queen Elizabeth II Diamond Jubilee Medal
2015 Founded Chor Amica, a chamber choir based in London, Ontario
2016 Awarded the Order of Canada
2017 Inducted into the Jack Richardson London Music Awards (JRLMA) Hall of Fame 2021 Author of Sixty Years of Choral Music in Canada
