= New Ross (UK Parliament constituency) =

UK parliamentary constituency in Ireland, 1801–1885

- Former borough constituency for the House of Commons
- County: County Wexford
- Borough: New Ross

1801–1885
- Seats: 1
- Created from: New Ross (IHC)
- Replaced by: South Kilkenny; South Wexford

New Ross was a United Kingdom Parliament constituency in Ireland, returning one Member of Parliament (MP) from 1801 to 1885.

== History ==
It was an original constituency represented in Parliament when the Union of Great Britain and Ireland took effect on 1 January 1801.

It was disfranchised under the Redistribution of Seats Act 1885, which took effect at the 1885 general election.

== Boundaries ==
This constituency was the parliamentary borough of New Ross predominantly in County Wexford and partially in County Kilkenny. In November 1831, commissioners proposed boundaries for the borough, to encompass the neighbouring village of Rosbercon. It was defined by the Parliamentary Boundaries (Ireland) Act 1832 as:

From the Point on the South of the Town at which the Lower Ballyhack Road is met by the Southern Fence of the Garden of Belle Vue Cottage along such Southern Fence to the Eastern Extremity thereof; thence in a straight Line up a steep Hill to the Point at which the Middle Ballyhack Road is joined by a Bye Road which runs Eastward therefrom, and at which Point there is a Gateway and One Pillar; thence along the said Bye Road to the Point at which the same turns to the South, and which is marked by a Gateway and Two Pillars; thence in a straight Line in an Easterly Direction to the Southern End of the Barn which stands in a Straw Yard on the Eastern Side of the Upper Ballyhack Road; thence, Northward, along the Upper Ballyhack Road to the Point at which the same meets the Wexford Road; thence, East-ward, along the Wexford Road to the Point at which the same is joined by a Road from Irish Town; thence in a straight Line to the South-western Corner of the Burial Ground at the Eastern Extremity of Irish Town; thence along the Western Boundary of the said Burial Ground to the Point at which the same meets the Irish Town Road; thence, West-ward, along the Irish Town Road to the Point at which the same is met by a Lane which runs Northward therefrom on the Eastern Side of Mr. Sutton's House and Brewery; thence, Northward, along the said Lane for about One hundred and thirty Yards to the Point at which the same reaches a Stone Stile; thence in a straight Line to a Gateway on the Mountgarret Road which is the first on the Eastern Side thereof, to the North of the Point at which the same is joined by a Road from Irish Town; thence in a straight Line in a North-westerly Direction to the Ruins of a Quay or Wharf on the Western Side of the River Barrow; thence in a straight Line to the Point at which the Kilkenny Road is joined by the first Bye Road to the West of the Roman Catholic Chapel; thence in a straight Line in a Southerly Direction to the South-western Corner of the Garden of the House attached to the Mill on the Western Bank of the River Barrow; thence along the Southern Boundary of the last-mentioned Garden to the South-eastern Corner thereof; thence in a straight Line to the Point first described.

== Members of Parliament ==
The use of Roman numerals to distinguish between MPs with the same name does not indicate that they were known in that way during their lifetimes.

Election	Member	Party	Note
1801 general election	Robert Leigh		1801: Co-opted
1802 general election	Charles Tottenham (I)		Resigned
1805 New Ross by-election	Ponsonby Tottenham		
1806 general election	Charles Leigh		
1807 general election	William Wigram (I)		
1812 general election	Charles Leigh		
1818 general election	John Carroll		Resigned
1821 New Ross by-election	Francis Leigh	Tory	Resigned
1824 New Ross by-election	John Doherty	Tory	
1826 general election	William Wigram (II)	Tory	
1830 general election	Charles Powell Leslie II	Tory	
1831 general election	Charles Tottenham (II)	Tory	Resigned
1831 New Ross by-election	William Wigram (II)	Tory	
1832 general election	John Hyacinth Talbot	Repeal Association	
1841 general election	Hon. Robert Gore	Whig	
1847 general election	John Hyacinth Talbot	Repeal Association	
1852 general election	Charles Gavan Duffy	Ind. Irish	
1856 New Ross by-election	Charles Tottenham (II)	Conservative	Resigned
1863 New Ross by-election	Charles George Tottenham	Conservative	
1868 general election	Patrick McMahon	Liberal	
1874 general election	John Dunbar	Home Rule League	Died
1878 New Ross by-election	Charles George Tottenham	Conservative	
1880 general election	Joseph Foley	Home Rule League	Resigned
1881 New Ross by-election	John Redmond	Home Rule League	Last MP for the constituency
1885	Constituency abolished		

== Elections ==
=== Elections in the 1830s ===
General election 1830: New Ross
Party	Candidate	Votes	%
Tory	Charles Powell Leslie	Unopposed	
Tory hold			

General election 1831: New Ross
Party	Candidate	Votes	%
Tory	Charles Tottenham	Unopposed	
Registered electors		24	
Tory hold			

Tottenham resigned, causing a by-election.

By-election, 15 August 1831: New Ross
Party	Candidate	Votes	%
Tory	William Wigram	Unopposed	
Tory hold			

General election 1832: New Ross
Party	Candidate	Votes	%
Repeal	John Hyacinth Talbot	Unopposed	
Registered electors		130	
Repeal gain from Tory			

General election 1835: New Ross
Party	Candidate	Votes	%
Repeal (Whig)	John Hyacinth Talbot	49	53.3
Conservative	Charles Tottenham	43	46.7
Majority		6	6.6
Turnout		92	41.6
Registered electors		221	
Repeal hold			

General election 1837: New Ross
Party	Candidate	Votes	%
Repeal (Whig)	John Hyacinth Talbot	Unopposed	
Registered electors		232	
Repeal hold			

=== Elections in the 1840s ===
General election 1841: New Ross
Party	Candidate	Votes	%	±%
Whig	Robert Gore	Unopposed		
Registered electors		277		
Whig gain from Repeal				

General election 1847: New Ross
Party	Candidate	Votes	%	±%
Repeal	John Hyacinth Talbot	76	61.3	New
Whig	Richard Keily	48	38.7	N/A
Majority		28	22.6	N/A
Turnout		124	42.2	N/A
Registered electors		294		
Repeal gain from Whig		Swing	N/A	

=== Elections in the 1850s ===
General election 1852: New Ross
Party	Candidate	Votes	%	±%
Independent Irish	Charles Gavan Duffy	82	72.6	New
Conservative	Henry Lambert	31	27.4	New
Majority		51	45.2	N/A
Turnout		113	66.1	+23.9
Registered electors		171		
Independent Irish gain from Repeal		Swing	N/A	

Duffy resigned by accepting the role of Steward of the Chiltern Hundreds, causing a by-election.

By-election, 18 March 1856: New Ross
Party	Candidate	Votes	%	±%
Conservative	Charles Tottenham	87	56.9	+29.5
Whig	Thomas Nicholas Redington	66	43.1	−29.5
Majority		21	13.8	N/A
Turnout		153	80.1	+14.0
Registered electors		191		
Conservative gain from Independent Irish		Swing	+29.5	

General election 1857: New Ross
Party	Candidate	Votes	%	±%
Conservative	Charles Tottenham	90	55.9	+28.5
Conservative	Samuel Robert Graves	71	44.1	N/A
Majority		19	11.8	N/A
Turnout		161	84.3	+18.2
Registered electors		191		
Conservative gain from Independent Irish		Swing	N/A	

General election 1859: New Ross
Party	Candidate	Votes	%	±%
Conservative	Charles Tottenham	86	52.8	−3.1
Liberal	Joseph Neale McKenna	77	47.2	New
Majority		9	5.6	−6.2
Turnout		163	83.6	−0.7
Registered electors		195		
Conservative hold		Swing	N/A	

=== Elections in the 1860s ===
Tottenham resigned, causing a by-election.

By-election, 8 June 1863: New Ross
Party	Candidate	Votes	%	±%
Conservative	Charles George Tottenham	81	50.6	−2.2
Liberal	Joseph Neale McKenna	79	49.4	+2.2
Majority		2	1.2	−4.4
Turnout		160	83.8	+0.2
Registered electors		191		
Conservative hold		Swing	−2.2	

General election 1865: New Ross
Party	Candidate	Votes	%	±%
Conservative	Charles George Tottenham	Unopposed		
Registered electors		191		
Conservative hold				

General election 1868: New Ross
Party	Candidate	Votes	%	±%
Liberal	Patrick McMahon	Unopposed		
Registered electors		259		
Liberal gain from Conservative				

=== Elections in the 1870s ===
General election 1874: New Ross
Party	Candidate	Votes	%	±%
Home Rule	John Dunbar	122	60.1	New
Conservative	Charles George Tottenham	81	39.9	New
Majority		41	20.2	N/A
Turnout		203	85.3	N/A
Registered electors		238		
Home Rule gain from Liberal		Swing	N/A	

Dunbar's death caused a by-election.

By-election, 17 Dec 1878: New Ross
Party	Candidate	Votes	%	±%
Conservative	Charles George Tottenham	95	51.4	+11.5
Home Rule	George Delany	90	48.6	−11.5
Majority		5	2.8	N/A
Turnout		185	84.5	−0.8
Registered electors		219		
Conservative gain from Home Rule		Swing	+11.5	

=== Elections in the 1880s ===
General election 1880: New Ross
Party	Candidate	Votes	%	±%
Home Rule	Joseph Foley	165	68.2	+8.1
Conservative	Charles George Tottenham	77	31.8	−8.1
Majority		88	36.4	+16.2
Turnout		242	90.6	+5.3
Registered electors		267		
Home Rule hold		Swing	+8.1	

Foley resigned, causing a by-election.

By-election, 31 Jan 1881: New Ross
Party	Candidate	Votes	%	±%
Home Rule	John Redmond	Unopposed		
Registered electors		261		
Home Rule hold				
