= Leslie Fagen =

American litigator

- Education: Yale College (BA); Columbia Law School (JD)
- Occupation: Attorney
- Employer: Paul, Weiss, Rifkind, Wharton & Garrison (former)

Leslie Gordon Fagen is an American litigator. He was formerly a senior partner at the international law firm of Paul, Weiss, Rifkind, Wharton & Garrison LLP.

== Early life and education ==
Fagen was born in Brooklyn, New York. He earned his B.A. from Yale College in 1971 and went on to receive a J.D. from Columbia School of Law in 1974. He clerked for Judge Jack B. Weinstein in the United States District Court for the Eastern District of New York.

== Career ==
Fagen was formerly a senior partner in the Litigation Department of Paul, Weiss, Rifkind, Wharton & Garrison LLP. He had served as chair of the firm's Litigation Department. As a trial lawyer, he had litigated on behalf of both plaintiffs and defendants. His work at Paul, Weiss, Rifkind, Wharton & Garrison LLP was profiled in a 2006 cover story in The American Lawyer that highlighted the firm’s litigation practice.

In addition to his law practice, Fagen has taught as an adjunct lecturer at Columbia Law School and has served as an adjunct professor at Brooklyn Law School.

== Professional affiliations ==
Fagen has been involved with numerous nonprofit organizations. He serves on the boards of the Brennan Center for Justice and the Columbia Law School Board of Visitors, and he is a trustee of the Kohlberg Foundation. Fagen is also a Fellow of the American College of Trial Lawyers.

== Publications ==
Fagen has written on topics such as intellectual property, product liability, and arbitration. He produced a biographical piece on Judge Simon H. Rifkind for The Yale Biographical Dictionary of American Law and edited the collection At 90. On the 90's.
