= Jim Fagan =

Australian rules footballer (1882–1948)

Personal information
- Full name: Jim Fagan
- Born: 24 May 1882
- Died: 20 March 1948 (aged 65)
- Original team: North Melbourne (VFA)

Playing career^{1}
Years	Club	Games (Goals)
1906	St Kilda	1 (2)
- ^{1} Playing statistics correct to the end of 1906.

Jim Fagan (24 May 1882 – 20 March 1948) was an Australian rules footballer who played with St Kilda in the Victorian Football League (VFL).
