= John Dunbar (MP) =

British politician

John Dunbar MP

Member of Parliament for New Ross
- In office 17 February 1874 – 4 December 1878
- Preceded by: Patrick McMahon
- Succeeded by: Charles George Tottenham

Personal details
- Died: 4 December 1878 Kensington, London
- Party: Home Rule League

John Dunbar was a Home Rule League politician who served as the Member of Parliament (MP) for New Ross from February 1874 through to his death in 1878.
