= William Wigram =

English politician (1780–1858)

William Wigram (1780 – 8 January 1858) was an English Member of Parliament for Irish constituencies.

He was MP for the Irish constituencies of New Ross from 1807 to 1812, 1826 to 1830 and 1831 to 1832 and Wexford from 1820 to 1826 and 1830 to 1831.

Wigram was also a Director of the East India Company from 1809 to 1854, acting as chairman in 1823–24.
