= James Fagan (MP) =

Politician

Member of Parliament for County Wexford
- In office 10 August 1847 – 26 July 1852 Serving with Hamilton Knox Grogan Morgan
- Preceded by: Villiers Francis Hatton; James Power
- Succeeded by: Patrick McMahon; John George

Personal details
- Born: 1800
- Died: 1863 (aged 62–63) Turvey House, Donabate
- Resting place: Glasnevin Cemetery
- Party: Repeal Association
- Parent: James Fagan

James Fagan (1800 – 1863) was an Irish Repeal Association politician and timber merchant.

Developer of the Grand Hotel in Malahide, Fagan was elected Repeal Association MP for County Wexford at the 1847 general election and held the seat until 1852 when he did not seek re-election.

He was a member of the Reform Club.

Parliament of the United Kingdom
Preceded by Villiers Francis Hatton; James Power	Member of Parliament for County Wexford; 1847–1852; With: Hamilton Knox Grogan Morgan	Succeeded by Patrick McMahon; John George
