= John Maher (MP) =

Irish politician (died 1860)

John Maher (died 28 May 1860) was an Irish politician.

Maher was educated at Clongowes Wood College. He inherited large estates in County Wexford from his father. He became a deputy lieutenant of Queen's County, and a steward of the Turf Club. At the 1835 UK general election, he stood in County Wexford for the Repeal Association. He won the seat, and held it at the 1837 UK general election, standing down in 1841.
