= Thomas Meagher =

Thomas Meagher may refer to:

- Thomas Meagher (merchant) (c 1764–1837) Irish emigrant to Newfoundland, merchant and ship-owner
- Thomas Meagher (MP) (1796–1874), Irish businessman and politician, Mayor of Waterford and MP for Waterford 1847–57
- Thomas Francis Meagher (1823–1867), leader of the Young Irelanders in the 1848 Rebellion, acting Governor of the Montana Territory
- Thomas William Meagher (1902–1979) Australian medical practitioner, Lord Mayor of Perth, Western Australia

== See also ==
- Meagher (surname)
