= Henry Barron =

Henry Barron may refer to:

- Sir Henry Barron, 1st Baronet (1795–1872), British MP for Waterford City
- Sir Henry Barron, 2nd Baronet (1824–1900), British diplomat and Minister-Resident to Wurttemberg, of the Barron baronets
- Henry D. Barron (1833–1882), United States politician in Wisconsin
- Henry Barron (judge) (1928–2010), judge at the Irish Supreme Court

== See also ==
- Harry Barron (1847–1921), Australian politician
- Barron (disambiguation)
