= 1869 Waterford City by-election =

UK Parliamentary by-election

The 1869 Waterford City by-election was fought on 22 November 1869. The by-election was fought due to the resignation (Inspector of Irish Fisheries) of the incumbent MP of the Liberal Party, John Aloysius Blake. It was won by the Liberal candidate Sir Henry Winston Barron.
