= Andrew Wyse =

Andrew Wyse may refer to:

- Andrew Nicholas Bonaparte-Wyse, (1870-1940), Northern Irish Catholic civil servant, Permanent Secretary
- Andrew Wise, also written Wyse, (d.1603), London publisher who issued first editions of five Shakespearean plays
