= Roman Catholic Diocese of Constantina =

Latin Catholic titular see

Diocese of Constantina Dioecesis Constantiniensis

Location
- Country: Osroene

Information
- Denomination: Catholic Church
- Sui iuris church: Latin Church

Current leadership
- Pope: Francis
- Bishop: Sede vacante

The Diocese of Constantina (Latin: Constantiniensis) is a sede vacante titular diocese of the Catholic Church. When a territorial diocese, it was in the Roman province of Osrhoene, Mesopotamia (now Turkey), a suffragan diocese within the ecclesiastical province of the Archdiocese of Edessa.

== Bishops ==
- Titular Bishop Francesco Sperelli - (13 Sep 1621 - 22 Jul 1631)
- Titular Bishop Daniel Vitus Nastoupil (Nastaupill, Hapstampsel) - (15 Dec 1664 Appointed - 21 Nov 1665 Died)
- Titular Bishop José Henrique Correa da Gama - (30 Jul 1727 - ?)
- Titular Bishop Giulio Mariano Carmelo Benzo - (23 Jun 1828 - 18 Nov 1856)
- Titular Bishop Edward Barron - (3 Oct 1842 - 2 Mar 1844)
- Titular Bishop Joseph Rabbani - (14 Dec 1947 - 24 Feb 1951)
- Titular Bishop Josef Hiltl - (28 Apr 1951 - 20 Apr 1979)
