= Daniel O'Connell Jnr =

Irish politician (1816–1897)

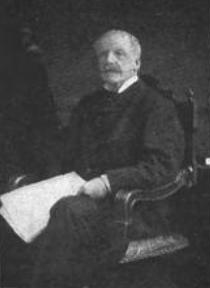
- Born: 1816
- Died: 14 June 1897 (aged 80–81); Bedford, England
- Occupations: Brewer, politician
- Parents: Daniel O'Connell (father); Mary O'Connell (mother)
- Relatives: Maurice (brother); John (brother); Morgan (brother); Ellen (sister)

Daniel O'Connell (Jnr) (1816 – 14 June 1897) was one of seven children (the youngest of four sons) of Daniel and Mary O'Connell of Ireland. He served in the British Parliament from 1846 to 1847 as Member of Parliament (MP) for Dundalk, from 1847 to 1848 as an MP for Waterford City, and from 1853 to 1863 as MP for Tralee. He was also a moderately successful brewer, producing a brand called "O'Connell's Ale", which for a short time tried to compete with Guinness in popularity. His brothers Maurice, John and Morgan were all MPs.

He died in Bedford on 14 June 1897.

== See also ==
- O'Connell of Derrynane

Parliament of the United Kingdom
Preceded by Thomas Nicholas Redington	Member of Parliament for Dundalk; 1846–1847	Succeeded by Charles Carroll McTavish
Preceded by Sir Henry Barron, Bt; Thomas Wyse	Member of Parliament for Waterford City; 1847 – 1848; With: Thomas Meagher	Succeeded by Thomas Meagher; Sir Henry Barron, Bt
Preceded by Maurice O'Connell	Member of Parliament for Tralee; 1853–1863	Succeeded by Thomas O'Hagan
