= Fort Elizabeth Meagher =

- Gallatin County, Montana

Location
- Coordinates: 45°38′30″N 110°55′05″W

Site history
- Built: 1867

Fort Elizabeth Meagher, named for the wife of Thomas F. Meagher, secretary and former acting governor of the Montana Territory, was established in May, 1867 eight miles east of the town of Bozeman, Montana at the mouth of Rocky Creek by Brigadier General Thomas Thoroughman and Colonel Walter W. De Lacy of the Montana Territory Volunteer Militia. The post's mission was to provide settlers protection against hostile Crow and Sioux Native Americans who were expected to invade the area following the murder of John Bozeman in April 1867. The main post stockade, and a picket-post erected on the approaches to Bridger Pass, were designed to block the passes through the mountains into the valley. The post was abandoned in August 1867 when nearby Fort Ellis was built.

== See also ==
- List of military installations in Montana
