= Sir Henry Page-Turner Barron, 2nd Baronet =

Sir Henry Page-Turner Barron, 2nd Baronet of Glenanna and Barroncourt (born 27 December 1824, died 13 September 1900 in Stuttgart) was a British diplomat. He was son of politician Sir Henry Barron, 1st Baronet and Anna Leigh Guy Page-Turner.

He was educated at Prior Park College, Bath, then joined the diplomatic service. He was posted at as an attaché Berne in 1840, Turin in 1841, Florence in 1848–1850, Berlin in 1852, and Stuttgart and Brussels in 1853. He was secretary at in Lisbon 1858–1861, at Brussels in 1861–1866, and at the Embassy in Constantinople 1866–1871, where he was Acting Chargé d'Affaires from July to October 1867 and from November 1869 to May 1870. He moved back to Brussels, where he was Secretary of the Legation from 1871–1883. He served as Minister-Resident to the King of Württemberg 1883–1890. He was author of approximately forty-five official reports on Belgium, Portugal, Turkey and Württemberg.

He succeeded his father as 2nd Baronet in 1872, and was made a Companion of the Order of St Michael and St George on 20 July 1882.

The baronetcy became extinct on his death in 1900. He left his Irish estates to his first cousin once removed, Edward Alphonse Winston Barron (1876–1939), and his English estates to his nephew Cecil Polhill, with the exception of some charitable bequests including funds for the restoration of Ferrybank Roman Catholic Church, County Waterford, and the donation of ten Dutch old master paintings to the National Gallery of Ireland.

== See also ==
- Barron baronets
