= William Morris Reade =

Irish conservative politician (1787-1847)

Valentine Maher

Member of Parliament for Waterford City
- In office 12 July 1841 – 13 June 1842 Serving with William Christmas
- Preceded by: Henry Barron; Thomas Wyse
- Succeeded by: Henry Barron; Thomas Wyse

Personal details
- Born: 1787
- Died: 31 March 1847 (aged 59–60)
- Party: Conservative

William Morris Reade (1787 – 31 March 1847) was an Irish Conservative politician.

He married Elizabeth Maitland, daughter of Patrick Maitland and Anne née Bateman on 6 February 1827, with whom he had two children: William Morris Reade (1830–1886), and Louisa Reade (died 1918).

After unsuccessfully contesting the seat in 1835, Reade was first elected Conservative MP for Waterford City at the 1841 general election but was removed upon petition the following year.

Parliament of the United Kingdom
Preceded by Henry Barron; Thomas Wyse	Member of Parliament for Waterford City; 1841–1842; With: William Christmas	Succeeded by Henry Barron; Thomas Wyse
