= James Delahunty =

Irish politician (1808–1885)

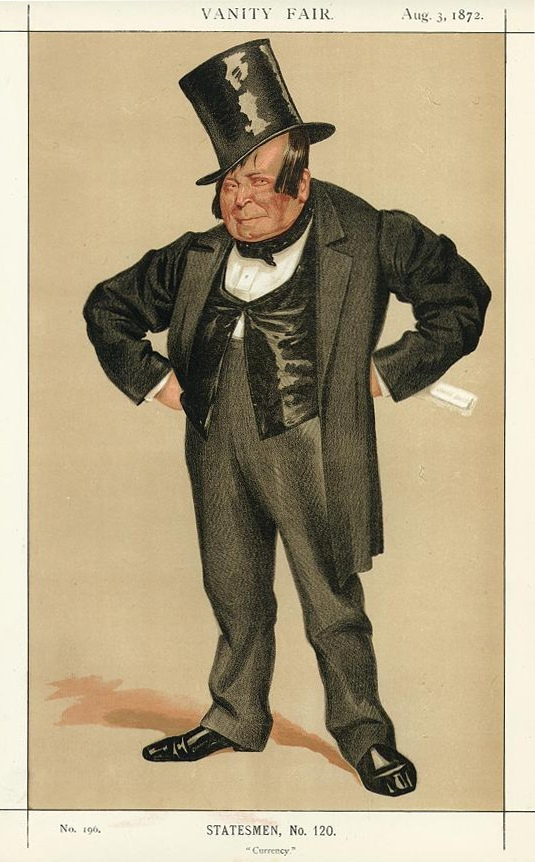
Vanity Fair caricature of Delahunty by James Tissot

James Delahunty (24 July 1808 – 15 June 1885) was an Irish Liberal Party politician from Waterford.

Born in Waterford, and educated at St. John's College, Waterford, Delahunty was chairman of the Waterford and Central Ireland Railway Company, and director of the Kilkenny Junction Railway Company.

Involved in local politics for some decades, he was elected at the 1868 general election as the Member of Parliament (MP) for Waterford City. He later lost his seat in the 1874 general election, when both the city's seats were won by candidates of the Home Rule Party.

He returned to the House of Commons three years later, when he was elected at a by-election in January 1877 as MP for County Waterford following the death of Sir John Esmonde, Bt. This time Delahunty was himself a Home Rule candidate, and he defeated his Liberal opponent by a margin of more than 3:1.

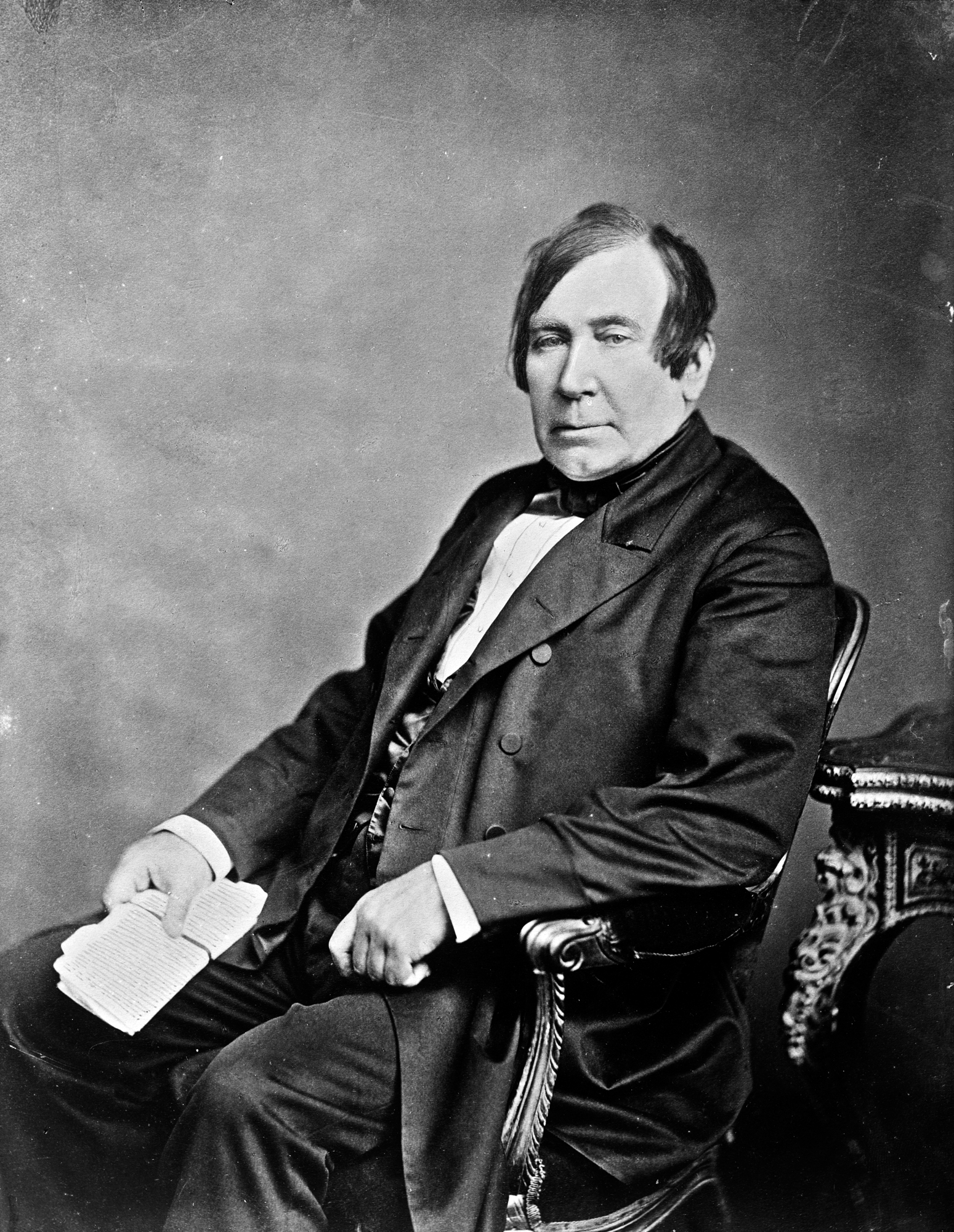
Delahunty

Delahunty "was laughed at because of the dullness of his oratory", and in 1878 caused some amusement in the Commons by spreading on his bench sundry personal items taken from his bag in a search for the notes for his speech on the Money Laws (Ireland) Bill. An 1879 description described Delhunty as "a genial, warm-hearted Irishman who is generally liked in the House". He died in 1885, aged 76.

Parliament of the United Kingdom
Preceded by Sir Henry Barron, Bt; John Aloysius Blake	Member of Parliament for Waterford City; 1868 – 1874; With: John Aloysius Blake to 1869; Sir Henry Barron, Bt 1869–70; Ralph Bernal Osborne 1870–74	Succeeded by Richard Power; Purcell O'Gorman
Preceded by Lord Charles Beresford; Sir John Esmonde, Bt	Member of Parliament for County Waterford; 1877 – 1880; With: Lord Charles Beresford	Succeeded by John Aloysius Blake; Henry Villiers-Stuart
