= Patrick Shea (civil servant) =

Northern Irish civil servant

Patrick Shea CB, OBE, FRSA (27 April 1908 – 31 May 1986) was a Northern Irish civil servant and the first Roman Catholic since A. N. Bonaparte-Wyse in the 1920s to achieve the rank of permanent secretary of a government department in Northern Ireland.

== Career ==
Shea was born in Delvin, County Westmeath, where his father, a native Irish speaker from West Kerry, was a member of the Royal Irish Constabulary. Shea grew up in various locations around the country to which his father was posted.

One of his earliest memories was being taken by his father to watch the celebrations in the Phoenix Park, Dublin that followed the passing of the Third Home Rule Bill in 1912. This would have established a devolved parliament in Dublin after it had completed its passage through the House of Lords which it was due to do by 1914. However, the outbreak of World War I caused Home Rule to be suspended for the war's duration, and following the Easter Rising of 1916, the subsequent success of Sinn Féin at the 1918 General Election and its establishment of a provisional government in Dublin in 1919 the Bill was never put into effect. During the Irish War of Independence, Shea developed a strong hostility to Irish Republicans whose primary targets were RIC policeman such as his father.

Their guns were aimed at the ones I loved. I was an uncompromising West Briton.

Following the disbandment of the RIC in 1922 upon the creation of the Irish Free State via the Anglo-Irish Treaty/Partition of Ireland, Shea's father joined the Royal Ulster Constabulary, attaining the rank of head constable and later clerk of petty sessions in Newry, County Down, where the family later lived.

Patrick Shea attended the Abbey CBS in Newry. Upon leaving, he joined the Northern Ireland Civil Service in June 1926. His postings included:

- Ministry of Labour, clerical officer 1926–1935 Belfast, outdoor officer Enniskillen 1935–1938, senior clerk, headquarters 1938–1939
- Ministry of Finance, assistant principal 1939–1941, deputy principal 1941. His initial appointment to this office was blocked because he was a Roman Catholic by the Minister of Labour John F. Gordon who was later overruled by John M. Andrews the Minister of Finance.
- Secretary Civil Service Committee for Northern Ireland 1941
- Ministry of Education, principal December 1947 – 1959, establishment officer and accountant
- Ministry of Finance, Public Buildings and Works, 1959–1963, assistant secretary 1963–1969
- Ministry of Education, permanent secretary, December 1969 – 1973

After retirement he chaired Enterprise Ulster from 1973 to 1979. Shea commented on his own career by recalling that it "was my experience that some Catholics, and especially those in Belfast, where I had been told, the Bishop advised them against seeking Government employment, looked with suspicion on Catholic civil servants. We had joined the enemy, we were lost souls".

== Honours ==
Shea was given an OBE in 1961 and CB 1972. He was made an Honorary member of the Royal Society of Ulster Architects in 1971 and a Fellow of the Royal Society of Arts in 1977. He was a long-time member of the Ulster Arts Club.

== Personal life ==
He married Eithne McHugh (d. 2000) in September 1941, and they had a daughter and two sons.

== Sources ==
- Shea, Patrick. Voices and the sound of drums, Blackstaff Press: 1981; ISBN 0-85640-247-8.
