= Marie Bonaparte-Wyse =

- Princess de Solms
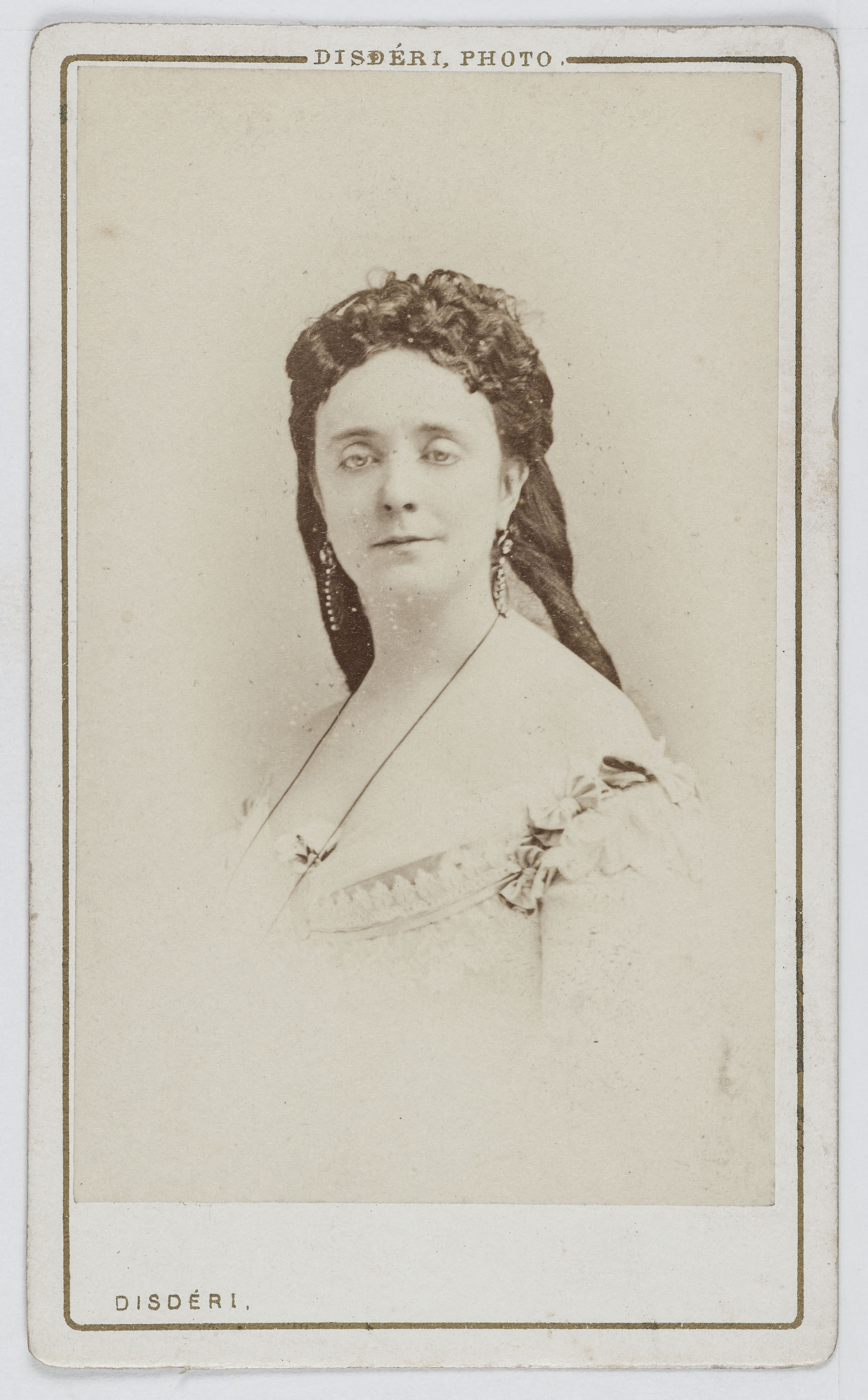
- Born: 25 April 1831; Waterford, Ireland
- Died: 6 February 1902 (aged 70); Paris
- Burial: Aix-les-Bains
- Spouse: Frédéric Joseph de Solms; Urbano Rattazzi
- Issue: Alexis de Solms; Romana Rattazzi; Teresa de Rute; Dolores de Rute
- House: House of Bonaparte
- Father: Thomas Wyse
- Mother: Princess Letizia Bonaparte
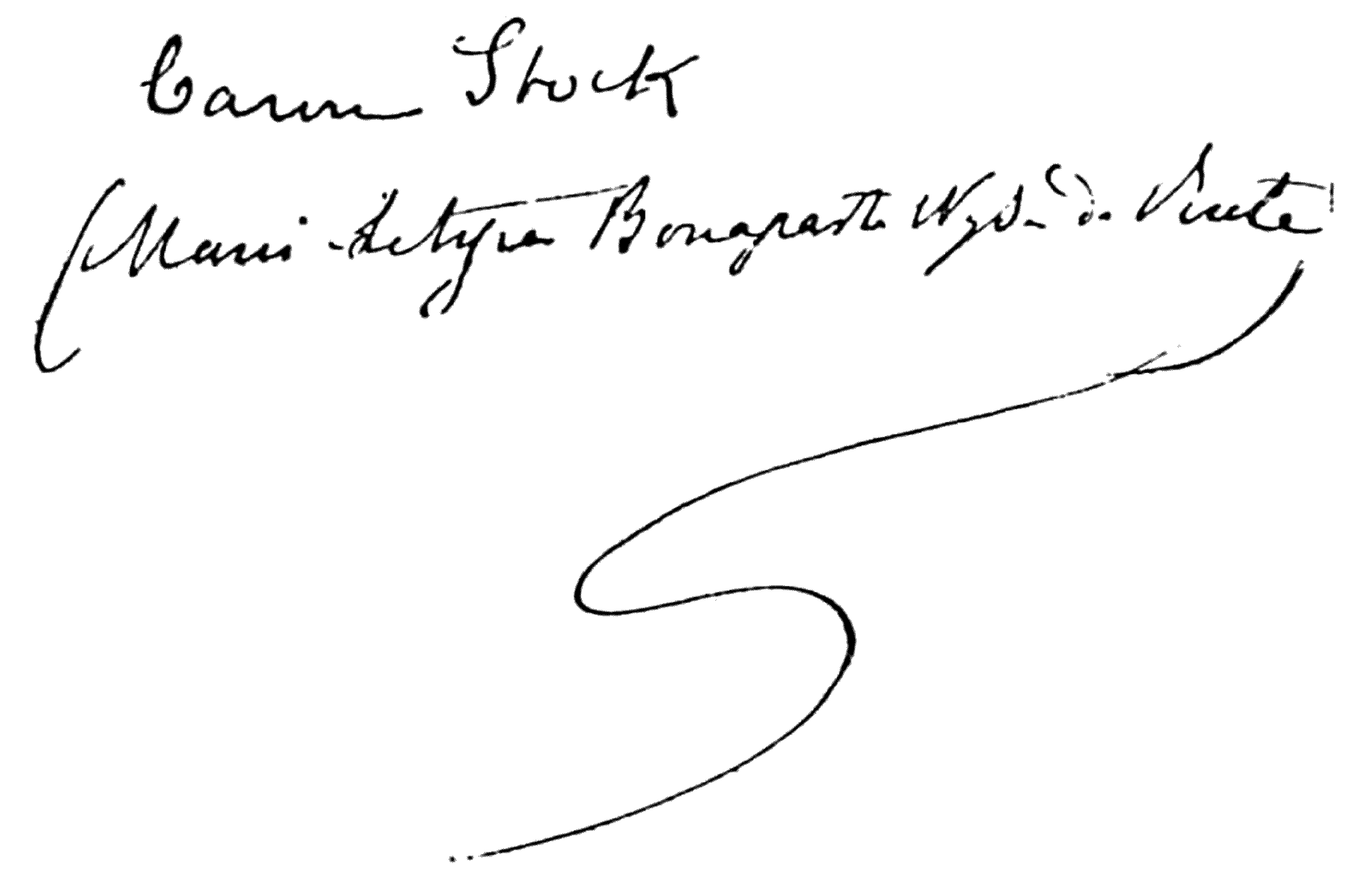
- Signature

Marie-Lætitia de Solms née Bonaparte-Wyse (25 April 1831 – 6 February 1902), was a French author and literary hostess.

== Biography ==
She was born in Waterford, Ireland, a granddaughter of Lucien Bonaparte (making her Emperor Napoleon I's great-niece) by his second wife, through the marriage of his daughter Letizia to Sir Thomas Wyse, an Irishman, British plenipotentiary at Athens, and Member of Parliament. However, she was born after her mother had been separated from Wyse for three years, and her biological father was British Army officer Captain Studholme John Hodgson.

She was educated in Paris. In December 1848, aged seventeen, Marie (secretly called Marie-Studholmine) married Frédéric Joseph de Solms (1815–63), a rich gentleman from Strasbourg who soon left her to go to America. Marie, known as the "Princess de Solms", remained with her mother, who kept a brilliant salon in Paris frequented by Victor Hugo, Eugène Sue, the younger Alexandre Dumas, and other writers.

In the early 1850s Marie had an affair with Count Alexis de Pomereu that produced a son in 1852. In February 1853, French authorities ordered her expulsion from the Empire, after accusations that she had illegally borne the name Bonaparte and had stirred up "scandalous disorders". There were however reports that Emperor Napoleon III had secretly paid his beautiful young cousin a number of visits, that the jealous Empress Eugenie had learned of the visits and told her husband that Marie maintained a salon of subversives, and that he had thereafter ordered her expulsion.

In August 1853 Marie settled at Aix-les-Bains in Savoy, then part of the Kingdom of Sardinia, where her lover (Pommereu) built her a chalet that soon became the center of a new literary salon. She went often to Turin, the kingdom's capital, where she established yet another salon at the Hôtel Feder. She maintained friendships with Hugo, Sue, Dumas and others, including Lajos Kossuth, Alphonse de Lamartine, Félicité Robert de Lamennais, Henri Rochefort, Tony Revillon, and the United States minister to Sardinia, John Moncure Daniel.

In 1859 Napoleon III's profligate cousin, Prince Napoleon, was betrothed to Clotilde, the fifteen-year-old daughter of King Vittorio Emanuele II of Sardinia. This was done as part of an agreement concluded by the king's prime minister, Count Cavour, to guarantee French support for Sardinia in the oncoming war to free northern Italy from Austrian occupation. (The king, openly unhappy with the betrothal, was secretly pleased.) Turin society was scandalized when the Princess de Solms flouted the emperor by appearing at the betrothal ball on the arm of U.S. Minister Daniel.

She was an early woman journalist, and through Sainte-Beuve, Marie contributed to Le Constitutionnel under the pen name "Baron de Stock". She also wrote for the Pays and the Turf. After Savoy was annexed to France (1860) as another part of the agreement between Napoleon III and Cavour, Marie went back to Paris where she played a prominent part in the literary and social events of the time. She gathered in her salon men of all shades of opinion. In 1863, her husband having died, she remarried the Piedmontese statesman Urbano Rattazzi, and lived with him in Italy where she was known as "Divina Fanciulla". After his death in June 1873, Madame Rattazzi returned to Paris, and a few months later married her Spanish friend, under-secretary Don Luis de Rute y Ginez (1844–89), whom she also outlived. Marie died a widow in 1902 in Paris.

She had one son, Alexis de Solms (1852–1927), fathered by her lover, Count Alexis de Pomereu; one daughter, Romana Rattazzi (1871–1943), by her second husband; and two adopted daughters, Teresa de Rute (1883–89) and Dolores de Rute (1885–88), with her third husband.

She was buried in Aix-les-Bains (France).

== Writings ==
Her writings consist of miscellaneous sketches, verses, plays, and novels, such as Si j'etais reine (1868) and Les mariages de la créole (1866), reprinted under the title La chanteuse (1870). Her 1867 novel Bicheville, a thinly disguised attack on the society of Florence, capital of the new Kingdom of Italy, caused serious embarrassment to Rattazzi, who was serving as prime minister of the recently established kingdom. She also wrote L'Aventurier des colonies (1885), a drama; and the volume of tales Enigme sans clef (1894).

In 1881 she edited Rattazzi et son temps, and in the last two or three years of her life published two volumes of her own memoirs, and edited the Nouvelle revue internationale, to which she also contributed a significant amount.
