= Andrew Bonaparte-Wyse =

British civil servant (1870–1940)

- Born: 1 November 1870; Limerick, County Limerick, Ireland
- Died: 1 June 1940 (aged 69); Dún Laoghaire, County Dublin, Ireland
- Occupation: Civil servant
- Spouse: Mariya de Chripunov
- Children: 1 son, 2 daughters
- Parent(s): William Bonaparte-Wyse; Ellen Linzee Prout
- Relatives: Sir Thomas Wyse (paternal grandfather); Lucien Bonaparte (paternal great-grandfather)

Andrew Reginald Nicholas Gerald Bonaparte-Wyse, CB, CBE (1 November 1870 – 1 June 1940) was an Irish civil servant and for many years the sole Roman Catholic in the Northern Ireland administration to rise to the rank of Permanent Secretary.

== Early life ==
Andrew Reginald Nicholas Gerald Bonaparte-Wyse was born on 1 November 1870 in Limerick, Ireland. He was the grandson of Sir Thomas Wyse, a Member of Parliament and educational reformer, and great-grandson of Lucien Bonaparte. His father, William Bonaparte-Wyse, was a poet who wrote in Provençal, was a friend of Mistral, and became the only foreign member of the consistory of the Félibrige, the Provençal cultural association.

He was educated at Downside School. He graduated from the University of London with Bachelor of Arts in French, and received a Master of Arts in Classics.

== Career ==
After teaching for some time near Chester, in 1895, he was appointed an inspector of national schools in Ireland. In 1897, he went to France and Belgium to assist an inquiry into the primary school curriculum. In 1905, he was appointed to the central office of the Commissioners of National Education, and a decade later was appointed junior secretary, the second-ranking officer in the department. Described by the historian Joseph Lee as a "hardline Unionist", Bonaparte-Wyse remarked on the change of attitude in Dublin following the Easter Rising of 1916: "there is a very menacing tone among the lower classes who openly praise the Sinn Féiners for their courage and bravery".

Following the Partition of Ireland in 1922, Bonaparte-Wyse transferred to the Northern Ireland Ministry of Education; he commuted to Belfast weekly from his home in Blackrock, County Dublin. In 1927, he was appointed Permanent Secretary, the only Roman Catholic at that grade in the service, and the last before the appointment of Patrick Shea in 1969. Bonaparte-Wyse later became a civil service commissioner for Northern Ireland before retiring in 1939.

He was a member of the Royal Irish Academy, a Knight of Malta, appointed a Commander of the Order of the British Empire (CBE) in the 1925 Birthday Honours, and a Companion of the Order of the Bath.

== Personal life ==
In 1896, he married Mariya de Chripunov, the daughter of a Russian aristocrat; the couple had had three children; two daughters, Helen Victoria and Mary Alexandrine, and a son, William Lucien, who served in the Free French Navy during the Second World War.

== Death ==
He died in a nursing home in Dún Laoghaire, Ireland, in 1940, aged 69.
