= Barron baronets =

Baronetcy in the Baronetage of the United Kingdom

The Barron Baronetcy, of Bellevue, in the County of Kilkenny was a title in the Baronetage of the United Kingdom. It was created on 12 October 1841 for Henry Winston Barron. He was a member of parliament and represented Waterford City several times. After the death of his only son, the second Baronet, a diplomat, the baronetcy became extinct.

== Barron baronets, of Bellevue (1841) ==
Escutcheon of the Barron baronets of Bellevue

- Sir Henry Winston Barron, 1st Baronet (1795–1872)
- Sir Henry Page-Turner Barron, 2nd Baronet (1824–1900)
