= John Aloysius Blake =

Irish politician (1826–1887)

John Aloysius Blake (1826 – 22 May 1887) was an Irish nationalist politician and Member of Parliament. He sat in the House of Commons of the United Kingdom of Great Britain and Ireland for Waterford County, Waterford City and County Carlow.

Blake was elected for Waterford City in 1857 and remained as member for that constituency until 1869; from 1880 to 1884 he was member for County Waterford; and in 1886 he was elected unopposed for County Carlow, in a by-election and held the seat, again unopposed, in the general election later that year.

Described as "one of the most moderate members of the Irish Nationalist party", Blake was chairman of the Fishery Harbours Commission for Ireland. He took an interest in issues of mental health, and wrote pamphlets urging improvements in the treatment of the mentally ill.

Parliament of the United Kingdom
Preceded by Thomas Meagher; Michael D. Hassard	Member of Parliament for Waterford City; 1857 – 1869; With: Michael D. Hassard to 1865; Sir Henry Barron, Bt 1865–68; James Delahunty from 1868	Succeeded by James Delahunty; Sir Henry Barron, Bt
Preceded by Lord Charles Beresford; James Delahunty	Member of Parliament for County Waterford; 1880 – 1884; With: Henry Villiers-Stuart	Succeeded by Henry Villiers-Stuart; Patrick Joseph Power
Preceded by Edmund Dwyer Gray	Member of Parliament for County Carlow; 1886–1887	Succeeded by James Patrick Mahon
