= Montana Territory Volunteer Militia =

- Flag of Montana
- Active: April 1867 to January 1868
- Country: United States
- Allegiance: Montana Territory
- Branch: Militia
- Engagements: none

Commanders
- Notable commanders: Brigadier General A. Thomas Thoroughman

The Montana Territory Volunteer Militia was a Militia organized in Montana Territory in 1867 as a result of increased incidents with Native Americans.

== History ==
With sharply increased settlement in Montana Territory at the end of the American Civil War, incidents with Native Americans on Montana's Benton Road and the Bozeman Trail increased dramatically. On May 4, 1867, G. S. Townsend of the U.S. War Department wrote to the acting Territorial Governor of Montana Thomas Francis Meagher on behalf of the U. S. Secretary of War Edwin M. Stanton concerning raising a Montana Territorial Militia:

"In answer to your telegram of April (28) twenty eight in relation to Indian invasion, I am instructed by the Sec'y. of War to inform you that authority has been given by this department to Liet. Genl. Sherman, to call out, organize, officer, arm and subsist such militia force in Montana Territory as he deems necessary for the protection of that Territory, against hostile Indians. Any suggestion you make to Genl. Sherman at St. Louis on matter relating to this subject, will receive his attention. Acknowledge receipt."

— G. S. Townsend to Acting Montana Territorial Governor Thomas F. Meagher, May 4, 1867

By the end of April 1867, a volunteer militia of 80 men had already been organized, and by the end of May, that number had grown to 150, consisting mostly of mounted horsemen. Acting governor Thomas Francis Meagher commissioned Thomas Thoroughman, an ex-Confederate lieutenant colonel, a brigadier general to command the Montana Militia in spring of 1867, and commissioned Walter W. De Lacy Colonel. In May 1867, the Montana Volunteer Militia under Thoroughman and De Lacy built Fort Elizabeth Meagher at the mouth of Rocky Creek in Gallatin County, Montana, to provide settlers protection from "hostile" Sioux and Crow Indians. By the end of July 1867, the Volunteer Militia force numbered 513 men present for duty, consisting of 32 officers and 481 enlisted men. Desertions were common, and in the summer a detachment of about one hundred men stationed on the Upper Yellowstone River deserted at once. On July 1, 1867, Acting Governor Meagher drowned in the Missouri River at Fort Benton, Montana, while receiving a shipment of ammunition for the Montana Militia. Governor Green Clay Smith then demoted Thomas Thoroughman to colonel, giving him principal responsibility in the Gallatin Valley. At the end of July, Smith issued a proclamation "calling for the service of 800 men for six months from the 1st of August, and inviting the old force to reenlist."

The arrival of United States Army regiments in Montana Territory from 1866 to 1867, including companies from the 2nd Cavalry, 7th Infantry, First Battalion, 13th Infantry and Second Battalion, 18th Infantry (redesignated the 27th Infantry), relieved the need for a Territorial Militia, and after fighting no battles, the Montana Territory Volunteer Militia was disbanded by January 1868.

== See also ==
- Thomas Francis Meagher
- Fort Elizabeth Meagher
