= William Bonaparte-Wyse =

Irish soldier and poet (1826–1892)

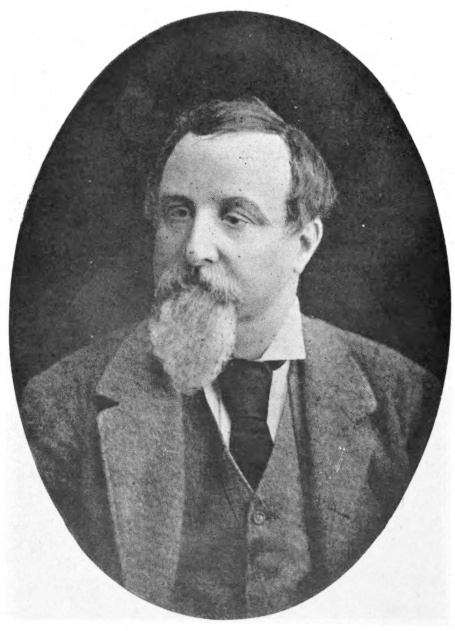
- Born: 20 January 1826; Waterford, County Waterford Ireland
- Died: 3 December 1892 (aged 66); Cannes, French Third Republic
- Resting place: Cannes
- Occupation: Poet
- Title: Captain
- Spouse: Ellen Linzee Prout
- Children: 4 sons, including Andrew Bonaparte-Wyse
- Parent(s): Thomas Wyse; Laetitia Bonaparte
- Relatives: Lucien Bonaparte (maternal grandfather)

Captain William Charles Bonaparte-Wyse (20 January 1826 – 3 December 1892) was an Irish soldier and poet.

== Early life ==
William Charles Bonaparte-Wyse was born in Waterford, the son of the politician and educational reformer Sir Thomas Wyse, and Laetitia, daughter of Lucien Bonaparte.

== Career ==
Nicknamed lo felibre irlandés, he wrote in Provençal, was a friend of Frédéric Mistral, and became the only foreign member of the consistory of the Félibrige, the Provençal cultural association. His collection Li Parpaioun Blu (The Blue Butterflies) was published in 1868, with a foreword by Mistral. He created the Provençal dish of dried figs poached in whiskey.

Bonaparte-Wyse was appointed High Sheriff of County Waterford for 1855. He was commissioned Captain in the 9th Wiltshire Rifle Volunteer Corps in July 1866. He also served in the Waterford Artillery.

== Personal life ==
He married in 1864, in London, Ellen Linzee Prout (1842–1925, niece of Servant of God Sister Elizabeth Prout), and they had four sons. He was the father of Permanent Secretary Andrew Nicholas Bonaparte-Wyse (1870–1940). His eldest son's godfather was Frédéric Mistral.

== Death ==
He died, aged 66, in 1892, at Cannes, and is buried there in the Cimetière du Grand Jas.
