= Robert Keating =

Irish politician

Robert Keating was an Irish politician from Cashel in County Tipperary.

== Biography ==
He was elected at the 1847 general election as a Member of Parliament (MP) for County Waterford, as a Repeal Association candidate. The Times newspaper of London reported that at the time of his election he was employed by the Board of Works a rate of 7s/6d per day, claiming that this proved "beyond a shadow of a doubt" that he was unqualified to be an MP.

He did not defend the seat at the 1852 general election, but stood instead as an Irish Whig Party candidate in Waterford City. He won that seat, and held it until 1857, when he did not stand again.

Parliament of the United Kingdom
Preceded by Hon. Robert Carew; William Villiers-Stuart	Member of Parliament for County Waterford; 1847 – 1852; With: Nicholas Mahon Power	Succeeded by John Esmonde; Nicholas Mahon Power
Preceded by Henry Barron; Thomas Meagher	Member of Parliament for Waterford City; 1852 – 1857; With: Thomas Meagher	Succeeded by Thomas Meagher; Michael D. Hassard
