= Michael D. Hassard =

Irish politician

Michael Dobbyn Hassard (1817 – 7 April 1869) was an Irish Conservative Party politician from County Waterford.

He was educated at Trinity College Dublin, where graduated with a gold medal (the university's award for an outstanding student), and became a lawyer. In 1846 he married his cousin Anne Hassard, the daughter of Sir Francis John Hassard. They lived at Glenville, County Waterford, and had 2 sons: William and Richard.

He was elected at the 1857 general election as the Member of Parliament (MP) for Waterford City, and was re-elected in 1859. In each session, he acted as Chair of Committees.

He stood down from the House of Commons at the 1865 general election, and became a member of the House of Commons Court of Referees, which considers whether a petitioner is entitled to make a challenge against a Private Bill.

Hassard died aged 51 on 7 April 1869, at his home in Glenville, after being ill with a fever for three weeks.

Parliament of the United Kingdom
Preceded by Robert Keating; Thomas Meagher	Member of Parliament for Waterford City; 1857 – 1865; With: Thomas Meagher to 1859; John Aloysius Blake from 1859	Succeeded by John Aloysius Blake; Henry Barron
