= The Immortal Irishman =

2016 non-fiction book by American author Timothy Egan

The Immortal Irishman: The Irish Revolutionary Who Became an American Hero
- First edition
- Author: Timothy Egan
- Language: English
- Subject: History
- Genre: Non-fiction
- Published: 2016
- Publisher: Houghton Mifflin Harcourt
- Publication place: USA
- Pages: 384
- ISBN: 0544272889

The Immortal Irishman: The Irish Revolutionary Who Became an American Hero is a 2016 non-fiction book by American author Timothy Egan. The books details the life and times of Thomas Francis Meagher, from his rise as a public speaker during the Great Hunger, his time in Tasmania, his leadership of the Irish Brigade during the American Civil War, and his final adventure to Montana.

The book received a positive review in the Boston Globe while it was criticized in a review in the Washington Post.
