= William Christmas (Waterford MP) =

Irish politician

William Christmas (c. 1798 – 22 March 1867) was an Irish Conservative Party politician from Waterford.

== Biography ==
He was the eldest son of Thomas Christmas of Whitfield, High Sheriff of County Waterford and his cousin Ada Osborne, daughter of Sir William Osborne, 8th Baronet and Elizabeth Christmas, daughter of Thomas Christmas. The Christmas family had been dominant in Waterford politics for generations. William in his turn was High Sheriff in 1824.

He was elected at the 1832 general election as the Member of Parliament (MP) for Waterford City, but was defeated at the 1835 general election. He served again briefly as MP in 1841-2. He was a firm opponent of any democratic reform, and a political enemy of Daniel O'Connell, who called him "a Christmas of the darkest winter".

In later life, he became extremely unpopular. At Christmas time 1866, he was set upon by an angry crowd and savagely assaulted, and died from his injuries three months later.

He married Octavia Whinyates, daughter of Colonel Thomas Whinyates. They had no children. William left all his possessions to Octavia for life; the estate passed on her death to his nephew, William Osborne Christmas. Octavia died in 1882.

Parliament of the United Kingdom
Preceded by Sir John Newport, Bt	Member of Parliament for Waterford City; 1832 – 1835; With: Henry Barron	Succeeded by Henry Barron; Thomas Wyse
Preceded by Henry Barron; Thomas Wyse	Member of Parliament for Waterford City; 1841 – 1842; With: William Morris Reade	Succeeded by Henry Barron; Thomas Wyse
