= Thomas Meagher (MP) =

Irish businessman and politician

- Born: 1796; St. John's, Newfoundland
- Died: 1874 (aged 77–78); Waterford, Ireland
- Occupation: Mayor of Waterford
- Spouse: Alicia Quan
- Children: 5

Thomas Meagher (1796–1874) was an Irish businessman and politician, born and raised in St. John's, Colony of Newfoundland.

His father, also named Thomas Meagher (1763–1837), had emigrated from Tipperary to St. John's, Colony of Newfoundland, where he became a successful businessman. The younger Thomas was born in St. John's and returned to Ireland in his 20s to represent his father's business interests, where he prospered.

Meagher was Mayor of Waterford in 1843 and 1844, the first Roman Catholic mayor of the city since the penal laws. He was elected at the 1847 general election as the Member of Parliament (MP) for Waterford City. He was re-elected in 1852, and held the seat until he stood down at the 1857 general election.

Meagher and his wife (Alicia Quan Meagher) had five children, only two of whom survived childhood. One of these, Thomas Francis Meagher (1823–1867), would garner renown as a leader of the Young Irelander Rebellion of 1848. The death sentence for his role in the rebellion was commuted to transportation to Australia. He escaped and went to United States, where he rose to the rank of brigadier general in the U.S. Army during the American Civil War, and later became acting governor of the Montana Territory.

== Death ==
Thomas Meagher, who died in 1874, having been predeceased by all save possibly one of his children; the year of death of his daughter, Christine Mary Meagher, is unknown.

Thomas Meagher's grave is located at Faithlegg Church cemetery, Checkpoint, County Waterford.

Parliament of the United Kingdom
Preceded by Sir Henry Barron, Bt; Thomas Wyse	Member of Parliament for Waterford City; 1847 – 1857; With: Daniel O'Connell Jnr 1847–48; Sir Henry Barron, Bt 1848–52; Robert Keating 1852–57	Succeeded by Michael Dobbyn Hassard; John Aloysius Blake
