= Waterford City (UK Parliament constituency) =

UK parliamentary constituency in Ireland, 1801–1922

- Former borough constituency for the House of Commons
- County: County Waterford
- Borough: Waterford

1801–1922
- Seats: 1 (1801–1832); 2 (1832–1885); 1 (1885–1922)
- Created from: Waterford City (IHC)
- Replaced by: Waterford–Tipperary East

Waterford City was a parliamentary constituency in southeast Ireland represented in the House of Commons of the United Kingdom from 1801 to 1922.

== History ==
Waterford was represented in Parliament from when the Union of Great Britain and Ireland took effect on 1 January 1801. It received a second MP under the Representation of the People (Ireland) Act 1832. It was reduced to one MP again under the Redistribution of Seats Act 1885.

Sinn Féin contested the 1918 general election on an abstentionist platform that instead of taking up any seats at Westminster, they would establish a revolutionary assembly in Dublin, which would be titled Dáil Éireann. The seat was won by William Redmond, who had been elected in the 1918 Waterford City by-election, succeeding his father John Redmond. Waterford City was the only Irish constituency outside of Ulster won by the IPP. All MPs elected to Irish seats were invited to participate in the First Dáil convened in January 1919; in practice, only Sinn Féin members did so.

Under the Government of Ireland Act 1920, the area became part of Waterford–Tipperary East, a 5-seat constituency for the Southern Ireland House of Commons and a single-seat constituency at Westminster. At the 1921 Southern Ireland House of Commons election, the five seats were won uncontested by Sinn Féin, who treated it as part of the election to the Second Dáil. It was never used as a Westminster constituency; under s. 1(4) of the Irish Free State (Agreement) Act 1922, no writ was to be issued "for a constituency in Ireland other than a constituency in Northern Ireland". Therefore, after the House of Commons was dissolved on 26 October 1922, no vote was held in Waterford–Tipperary East at the 1922 United Kingdom general election on 15 November 1922, shortly before the Irish Free State left the United Kingdom on 6 December 1922.

William Redmond represented the Dáil constituency of Waterford from 1923 until his death in 1931. Bridget Redmond, his wife, represented the constituency from 1932 until her own death in 1952.

== Boundaries ==
This was a borough constituency, comprising the parliamentary borough of Waterford in County Waterford. The boundary commissioners indicated in their report of December 1831 that as the limits of the county of the city were connected with the elective franchise, they were not authorised to propose any curtailment of them, nor was it necessary to extend them. It was defined by the Parliamentary Boundaries (Ireland) Act 1832 as: "The County of the City of Waterford".

Under the Representation of the People (Ireland) Act 1868, its boundaries were defined to include all of the municipal borough of Waterford. This had been defined in the Municipal Corporations (Ireland) Act 1840 as:

From the Point on the North-west Extremity of the Town where the Yard Wall of the Brewery of Messieurs Davis, Strangman, and Company joins the River Suir, in a straight Line to the Point where Summer Hill, Gallows Road, and Morgan's Street meet; thence along the Military Road, Morrisson's Road, Barrack Street, Manor Hill, College Street, Bath Street, across John's Pill at Wyse's Bridge, along Poleberry Street, to near the South Corner of Mr. Deleander's House; thence in a straight Line to where the John's Town Road and Upper Newtown Road meet; thence along the Upper Newtown Road towards East Passage to the Centre of the Road in front of the Orphan House; thence in a straight Line across the River to the Roman Catholic Chapel in the Abbey Church Lands; thence in a straight Line to Mr. Charles Gatson's Cottage on the Side of Mount Misery; thence across the River to the Point first described.

The 1917 Boundary Commission had recommended the abolition of the constituency, to become part of East Waterford. However, under the Redistribution of Seats (Ireland) Act 1918, it was retained, taking in part of the county outside the city, with East Waterford and West Waterford replaced by a single County Waterford constituency. It lost the Kilculliheen area to South Kilkenny. It was defined as:

The county borough of Waterford and the part of the rural district of Waterford No. 1 which consists of the district electoral divisions of Ballynakill, Kilbarry, Killoteran, and Waterford Rural.

== Members of Parliament ==
=== MPs 1801–32 ===
Election	Member	Party
1801	William Congreve Alcock	Tory
1803	Sir John Newport, Bt.	Whig

=== MPs 1832–85 ===
Representation increased to two members

Election	1st Member	1st Party	2nd Member	2nd Party
1832	Henry Barron	Repeal Association	William Christmas	Tory
1834	Henry Barron	Repeal Association	William Christmas	Conservative
1835	Henry Barron	Repeal Association	Thomas Wyse	Whig
1841	William Christmas	Conservative	William Morris Reade	Conservative
1841	Henry Barron	Whig	Thomas Wyse	Whig
1847	Thomas Meagher	Repeal Association	Daniel O'Connell Jnr	Repeal Association
1848 by-election	Thomas Meagher	Repeal Association	Henry Barron	Whig
1852	Thomas Meagher	Ind. Irish	Robert Keating	Ind. Irish
1857	John Aloysius Blake	Ind. Irish	Michael D. Hassard	Conservative
1859	John Aloysius Blake	Liberal	Michael D. Hassard	Conservative
1865	John Aloysius Blake	Liberal	Henry Barron	Liberal
1868	John Aloysius Blake	Liberal	James Delahunty	Liberal
1869	Henry Barron	Liberal	James Delahunty	Liberal
1870 by-election	Ralph Bernal Osborne	Liberal	James Delahunty	Liberal
1874	Richard Power	Home Rule League	Purcell O'Gorman	Home Rule League
1880	Richard Power	Home Rule League	Edmund Leamy	Parnellite Home Rule League
1882	Richard Power	Irish Parliamentary Party	Edmund Leamy	Irish Parliamentary Party
1885	Reduced to 1 seat			

=== MPs 1885–1918 ===
Representation reduced to one member

Election	Member	Party
1885	Richard Power	Nationalist
1890	Richard Power	Parnellite
1892 by-election	John Redmond	Parnellite
1900	John Redmond	Nationalist
1918 by-election	William Redmond	Nationalist
1922	UK constituency abolished	

== Elections ==
The single-member elections in this constituency took place using the first past the post electoral system. Multi-member elections used the plurality-at-large voting system.

=== Elections in the 1830s ===
General election 1830: Waterford City
Party	Candidate	Votes	%
Whig	John Newport	Unopposed	
Whig hold			

General election 1831: Waterford City
Party	Candidate	Votes	%
Whig	John Newport	Unopposed	
Registered electors		1,300	
Whig hold			

General election 1832: Waterford City (2 seats)
Party	Candidate	Votes	%
Repeal	Henry Barron	570	28.9
Tory	William Christmas	570	28.9
Repeal	Roger Hayes	453	23.0
Whig	Thomas Wyse	379	19.2
Turnout		1,140	91.9
Registered electors		1,241	
Majority		191	9.7
Repeal gain from Whig			
Majority		117	5.9
Tory win (new seat)			

General election 1835: Waterford City (2 seats)
Party	Candidate	Votes	%	±%
Whig	Thomas Wyse	587	34.2	+15.0
Repeal (Whig)	Henry Barron	561	32.7	−19.2
Conservative	William Christmas	440	25.6	+11.2
Conservative	William Morris Reade	129	7.5	−7.0
Turnout		965	65.5	−26.4
Registered electors		1,473		
Majority		147	8.6	N/A
Whig gain from Conservative		Swing	+6.5	
Majority		121	7.1	−2.6
Repeal hold		Swing	−10.7	

General election 1837: Waterford City (2 seats)
Party	Candidate	Votes	%	±%
Whig	Thomas Wyse	632	31.5	−2.7
Repeal (Whig)	Henry Barron	602	30.0	−2.7
Conservative	William Beresford	427	21.3	−4.3
Conservative	John Tracy O'Reilly	347	17.3	+9.8
Turnout		1,035	69.7	+4.2
Registered electors		1,486		
Majority		30	1.5	−7.1
Whig hold		Swing	−2.7	
Majority		175	8.7	+1.6
Repeal hold		Swing	−2.7	

Wyse was appointed as a Commissioner of the Treasury, requiring a by-election.

By-election, 6 September 1839: Waterford City
Party	Candidate	Votes	%	±%
Whig	Thomas Wyse	Unopposed		
Whig hold				

=== Elections in the 1840s ===
General election 1841: Waterford City (2 seats)
Party	Candidate	Votes	%	±%
Conservative	William Christmas	285	30.2	+8.9
Conservative	William Morris Reade	259	27.4	+10.1
Whig	Henry Barron	202	21.4	−10.1
Whig	Thomas Wyse	199	21.1	−8.9
Majority		57	6.0	N/A
Turnout		c. 473	c. 59.0	c. −10.7
Registered electors		802		
Conservative gain from Repeal		Swing	+8.9	
Conservative gain from Whig		Swing	+10.1	

On petition, Christmas and Reade were unseated and Wyse and Barron were declared elected on 13 June 1842.

General election 1847: Waterford City (2 seats)
Party	Candidate	Votes	%	±%
Repeal	Thomas Meagher	521	33.3	New
Repeal	Daniel O'Connell Jnr	499	31.9	New
Whig	Henry Barron	294	18.8	−2.6
Whig	Thomas Wyse	252	16.1	−5.0
Majority		205	13.1	N/A
Turnout		783 (est)	46.2 (est)	−12.8
Registered electors		1,696		
Repeal gain from Conservative		Swing		
Repeal gain from Conservative		Swing		

O'Connell resigned by accepting the office of Steward of the Chiltern Hundreds, causing a by-election.

By-election, 1 March 1848: Waterford City
Party	Candidate	Votes	%	±%
Whig	Henry Barron	318	41.1	+6.2
Repeal	Patrick Costello	301	38.9	−26.3
Irish Confederate	Thomas Francis Meagher	154	19.9	New
Majority		17	2.2	N/A
Turnout		773	45.6 (est)	−0.6
Registered electors		1,696 (1847 figure)		
Whig gain from Repeal		Swing	+16.3	

=== Elections in the 1850s ===
General election 1852: Waterford City (2 seats)
Party	Candidate	Votes	%	±%
Independent Irish	Thomas Meagher	463	29.5	−3.8
Independent Irish	Robert Keating	445	28.3	−3.6
Conservative	William Christmas	355	22.6	New
Whig	Henry Barron	309	19.7	−15.2
Majority		90	5.7	N/A
Turnout		786 (est)	69.3 (est)	+27.1
Registered electors		1,135		
Independent Irish gain from Repeal		Swing	+1.9	
Independent Irish gain from Repeal		Swing	+2.0	

General election 1857: Waterford City (2 seats)
Party	Candidate	Votes	%	±%
Independent Irish	John Aloysius Blake	519	33.1	−24.7
Conservative	Michael D. Hassard	479	30.5	+7.9
Whig	Henry Barron	330	21.0	+1.3
Radical	Andrew O'Dwyer	242	15.4	N/A
Turnout		785 (est)	67.7 (est)	−1.6
Registered electors		1,160		
Majority		40	2.6	−3.1
Independent Irish hold		Swing	−16.3	
Majority		149	9.5	N/A
Conservative gain from Independent Irish		Swing	+16.3	

General election 1859: Waterford City (2 seats)
Party	Candidate	Votes	%	±%
Conservative	Michael D. Hassard	536	35.3	+4.8
Liberal	John Aloysius Blake	529	34.8	+1.7
Liberal	Henry Barron	455	29.9	+8.9
Majority		7	0.5	−9.0
Turnout		760 (est)	67.0 (est)	−0.7
Registered electors		1,134		
Conservative hold		Swing	−2.9	
Liberal hold		Swing	−0.4	

=== Elections in the 1860s ===
General election 1865: Waterford City (2 seats)
Party	Candidate	Votes	%	±%
Liberal	John Aloysius Blake	592	40.8	+6.0
Liberal	Henry Barron	516	35.5	+5.6
Liberal	John Barrington	344	23.7	N/A
Majority		172	11.8	N/A
Turnout		726 (est)	62.8 (est)	−4.2
Registered electors		1,156		
Liberal gain from Conservative		Swing	N/A	
Liberal hold		Swing	N/A	

General election 1868: Waterford City (2 seats)
Party	Candidate	Votes	%	±%
Liberal	John Aloysius Blake	796	44.0	+3.2
Liberal	James Delahunty	583	32.2	N/A
Liberal	Henry Barron	430	23.8	+0.1
Majority		153	8.4	−3.4
Turnout		905 (est)	65.4 (est)	+2.6
Registered electors		1,383		
Liberal hold		Swing	N/A	
Liberal hold		Swing	N/A	

Blake resigned after he was appointed inspector of Irish fisheries, causing a by-election.

By-election, 22 November 1869: Waterford City
Party	Candidate	Votes	%	±%
Liberal	Henry Barron	487	50.8	+27.0
Liberal	Ralph Bernal Osborne	471	49.2	N/A
Majority		16	1.6	−6.8
Turnout		958	69.3	+3.9
Registered electors		1,383		
Liberal hold		Swing	N/A	

=== Elections in the 1870s ===
Barron was unseated on petition, causing a by-election.

By-election, 25 Feb 1870: Waterford City (1 seat)
Party	Candidate	Votes	%	±%
Liberal	Ralph Bernal Osborne	483	50.4	N/A
Ind. Nationalist	Patrick Joseph Smyth	475	49.6	New
Majority		8	0.8	−0.8
Turnout		958	69.3	0.0
Registered electors		1,383		
Liberal hold		Swing	N/A	

General election 1874: Waterford City (2 seats)
Party	Candidate	Votes	%	±%
Home Rule	Richard Power	526	27.8	New
Home Rule	Purcell O'Gorman	480	25.4	New
Conservative	Edward Gibson	365	19.3	New
Home Rule	James Delahunty	360	19.0	New
Liberal	Ralph Bernal Osborne	160	8.5	N/A
Majority		115	6.1	N/A
Turnout		1,208 (est)	87.7 (est)	+22.3
Registered electors		1,378		
Home Rule gain from Liberal		Swing	N/A	
Home Rule gain from Liberal		Swing	N/A	

=== Elections in the 1880s ===
General election 1880: Waterford City (2 seats)
Party	Candidate	Votes	%	±%
Home Rule	Richard Power	661	42.0	+14.2
Parnellite Home Rule League	Edmund Leamy	494	31.4	+12.4
Home Rule	Purcell O'Gorman	420	26.7	+1.3
Majority		74	4.6	−1.5
Turnout		788 (est)	54.3 (est)	−33.4
Registered electors		1,449		
Home Rule hold		Swing	N/A	
Home Rule hold		Swing	N/A	

1885 general election: Waterford City
Party	Candidate	Votes	%	±%
Irish Parliamentary	Richard Power	2,420	89.8	N/A
Irish Conservative	Fitzmaurice Gustavus Bloomfield	276	10.2	New
Majority		2,144	79.6	N/A
Turnout		2,696	68.3	+14.0 (est)
Registered electors		3,946		
Irish Parliamentary hold		Swing	N/A	

1886 general election: Waterford City
Party	Candidate	Votes	%	±%
Irish Parliamentary	Richard Power	Unopposed		
Registered electors		3,946		
Irish Parliamentary hold				

=== Elections in the 1890s ===
Power died, causing a by-election.

By-election 1891: Waterford City
Party	Candidate	Votes	%	±%
Irish National League	John Redmond	1,775	59.1	N/A
Irish National Federation	Michael Davitt	1,229	40.9	N/A
Majority		546	18.2	N/A
Turnout		3,004	74.2	N/A
Registered electors		4,046		
Irish National League gain from Irish Parliamentary		Swing	N/A	

1892 general election: Waterford City
Party	Candidate	Votes	%	±%
Irish National League	John Redmond	1,676	56.4	N/A
Irish National Federation	David Sheehy	1,293	43.6	N/A
Majority		383	12.8	N/A
Turnout		2,969	74.7	N/A
Registered electors		3,974		
Irish National League gain from Irish Parliamentary		Swing	N/A	

1895 general election: Waterford City
Party	Candidate	Votes	%	±%
Irish National League	John Redmond	1,788	59.3	+2.9
Irish National Federation	Thomas Joseph Farrell	1,229	40.7	−2.9
Majority		559	18.6	+5.8
Turnout		3,017	76.8	+2.1
Registered electors		3,927		
Irish National League hold		Swing	+2.9	

=== Elections in the 1900s ===
1900 general election: Waterford City
Party	Candidate	Votes	%	±%
Irish Parliamentary	John Redmond	Unopposed		
Registered electors		3,941		
Irish Parliamentary hold				

1906 general election: Waterford City
Party	Candidate	Votes	%	±%
Irish Parliamentary	John Redmond	Unopposed		
Registered electors		3,354		
Irish Parliamentary hold				

=== Elections in the 1910s ===
January 1910 general election: Waterford City
Party	Candidate	Votes	%	±%
Irish Parliamentary	John Redmond	Unopposed		
Registered electors		3,104		
Irish Parliamentary hold				

December 1910 general election: Waterford City
Party	Candidate	Votes	%	±%
Irish Parliamentary	John Redmond	Unopposed		
Registered electors		3,104		
Irish Parliamentary hold				

1918 by-election: Waterford City
Party	Candidate	Votes	%	±%
Irish Parliamentary	William Redmond	1,242	62.5	N/A
Sinn Féin	Vincent White	745	37.5	New
Majority		497	25.0	N/A
Turnout		1,987	66.9	N/A
Registered electors		2,972		
Irish Parliamentary hold		Swing	N/A	

General Election 14 December 1918: Waterford City
Party	Candidate	Votes	%	±%
Irish Parliamentary	William Redmond	4,915	52.6	N/A
Sinn Féin	Vincent White	4,431	47.4	N/A
Majority		484	5.2	N/A
Turnout		9,346	77.5	N/A
Registered electors		12,063		
Irish Parliamentary hold		Swing	N/A	

== Sources ==
- GITHENS-MAZER, Jonathan. Myths and Memories of the Easter Rising, Cultural and Political Nationalism in Ireland. Dublin and Portland, OR: Irish Academic Press, 2006, 238p.
- The Parliaments of England by Henry Stooks Smith (1st edition published in three volumes 1844–50), 2nd edition edited (in one volume) by F.W.S. Craig (Political Reference Publications 1973)
- Walker, Brian M., ed. (1978). Parliamentary Election Results in Ireland, 1801–1922. Royal Irish Academy.
- Stenton, M.; Lees, S., eds. (1978). Who's Who of British members of parliament: Volume II 1886–1918. The Harvester Press.
- Stenton, M.; Lees, S., eds. (1979). 'Who's Who of British members of parliament: Volume III 1919–1945. The Harvester Press.
- Leigh Rayment's Historical List of MPs – Constituencies beginning with "W" (part 1)
