= Edward Barron =

Irish-born academic and missionary bishop

Edward Barron (1801–1854) was an Irish-born missionary bishop who led a Catholic mission to Liberia.

== Life ==
Edward Barron was born on 18 June 1801, one of ten children of Pierce and Anna Winston Barron of Ballyneale, Clonea, Rathgormack, County Waterford. At the age of thirteen, Edward and his younger brother William were sent to St Edmund's College, Ware in Hertfordshire, England. In 1817, his eldest brother Pierce and four of his five sisters drowned when the packet William and Mary sank en route from Bristol to Waterford. From England Barron next attended the Lycée Henri-IV in Paris, before returning to Dublin to enter Trinity College to study law. He left without completing exams and entered St. John's College, Waterford to study for the priesthood. In 1823 Patrick Kelly (bishop of Waterford and Lismore) sent him to the Propaganda College in Rome to complete his studies, where he obtained a Doctorate in Theology.

He was ordained at St Agatha's church in Rome in 1829. Barron was appointed professor in St. John's College, Waterford, where he taught French, Hebrew and Philosophy for seven years. He then accepted the invitation of Dublin-born Francis Kenrick, coadjutor bishop of Philadelphia, to come to America. There he became in turn pastor of St. Mary's Church, Philadelphia, president of St. Charles Borromeo Seminary, and then vicar-general of the diocese.

== Liberia ==
In 1822 the American Colonization Society began sending black volunteers to the Pepper Coast to establish a colony for free people of color from the United States. A number of the first American colonists were Catholics sent to Liberia under the auspices of the Maryland State Colonization Society. In 1833, John England, Bishop of Charleston, had drawn attention to the West Coast of Africa, and had urged the sending of missioners to those regions. This appeal was renewed at the second Provincial Council of Baltimore, and the assembled Fathers commissioned Barron to undertake the work at Cape Palmas. Barron went over the ground carefully for a few years, and then repaired to Rome to give an account of the work, and to receive further instructions. On 21 December 1841, Barron, John Kelly of New York, and Denis Pindar, a lay catechist from Baltimore, set sail from Baltimore for Monrovia. After a time, finding that he did not receive missionaries enough to accomplish anything practical, Barron returned to Europe and the United States for more help.

While in Rome he was consecrated, 22 January 1842, titular Bishop of Constantia and Vicar Apostolic of Upper Guinea—an area encompassing both Liberia and Sierra Leone. He returned to Africa on 30 November 1843, arriving at Cape Palmas with seven priests and three brothers of the Congregation of the Holy Spirit. Five of these priests died on the mission of fever, to which Denis Pindar, the lay catechist, also succumbed on 1 January 1844. Barron and Kelly held out for two years, and then, wasted by fever, they determined to return to the United States, feeling that it was impossible to withstand the climate any longer.

Here, as far as his impaired health allowed, he again took up the duties of a missionary priest and assisted in the work of the episcopate in Philadelphia, St. Louis, and Florida. He died of yellow fever at Savannah on 12 September 1854 while helping the bishop of that see during an epidemic. After a long pastorate, Kelly died at Jersey City, New Jersey, 28 April 1866.

Barron's brother Sir Henry Barron, 1st Baronet served as an MP for Waterford City.
