= Thomas Meagher (merchant) =

Irish merchant and tailor (c. 1764–1837)

- Born: c. 1764; County Tipperary, Ireland
- Died: January 26, 1837 (aged 72–73); Waterford, Ireland
- Occupations: Merchant, tailor
- Spouse: Mary Crotty
- Children: 3 sons, including Thomas
- Relatives: Thomas Francis Meagher (grandson)

Thomas Meagher (c. 1764 – 26 January 1837) was an Irish merchant and tailor who arrived in Newfoundland Colony around 1780 as an apprentice to a clothier surnamed Crotty. After Mr Crotty's death, Meagher married his widow, Mary Crotty, and took over the Crotty business.

By 1808 Meagher had bought the Mary, which he replaced the following year with the Triton; in the fall of 1809 he shipped more than 1,350 quintals of cod and other products to Waterford. On the return voyage the Triton carried provisions and 62 migrants. His trading routes expanded to include other ports in North America. Demand for fish such as cod in southern Europe was growing and profits from the passenger and supply trades were considerable.

Meagher had sent his eldest son Thomas to Ireland to establish a branch of his business in Waterford. The younger Thomas married Alicia Quan, daughter of Alicia Forristall and Thomas Quan, of Wyse, Cashen and Quan, one of the largest trading companies in Waterford, at her parents' residence. Their most famous child, Thomas Francis Meagher, one of five siblings, was born on 23 August 1823.

Meagher's business in St. John's had suffered a major setback when the premises were wiped out in the Great Fire of 1817. The firm was rebuilt but never recovered from the loss which in 1820 declared insolvency and was dissolved on 31 August 1820.

== Sources ==
- Mannion, John (1988). "Meagher, Thomas". In Halpenny, Francess G. (ed.). Dictionary of Canadian Biography. Vol. VII (1836–1850) (online ed.). University of Toronto Press.
