= Thomas Wyse =

Irish politician and diplomat (1791–1862)

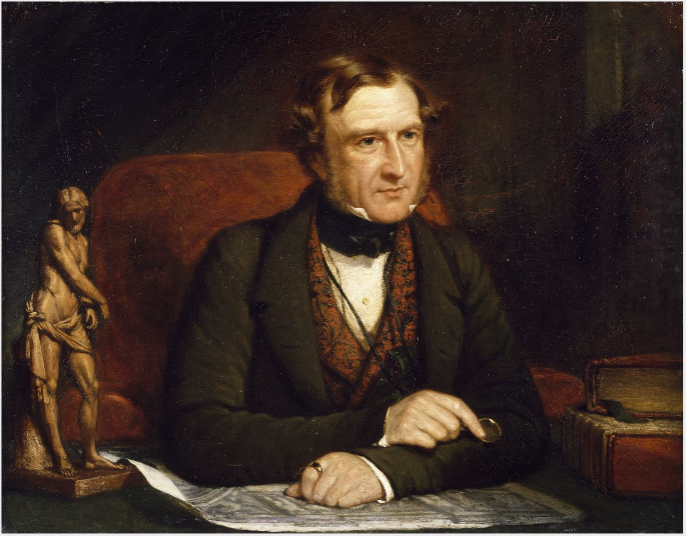

Member of the Parliament of the United Kingdom
- In office 1830–1832
- In office 1835–1847

British Minister to Greece
- In office 1849–1862

Sir Thomas Wyse KCB (24 December 1791 – 16 April 1862), an Irish politician and diplomat, belonged to a family claiming descent from a Devon Squire, Andrew Wyse, who is said to have crossed over to Ireland during the reign of Henry II and obtained lands near Waterford, of which city thirty-three members of the family are said to have been Mayors or other municipal officers: one, John Wyse, was Chief Baron of the Irish Exchequer in the 1490s.

== Life ==
From the Reformation the family had been consistently attached to the Catholic Church. Wyse was educated at Stonyhurst College and at Trinity College Dublin, where he distinguished himself as a scholar. After 1815, he passed some years in travel, visiting Italy, Greece, Egypt and Palestine. In 1821, he married Princess Laetitia Bonaparte (1804–1871), daughter of Lucien Bonaparte, and after residing for a time at Viterbo he returned to Ireland in 1825, having by this time inherited the family estates.

He now devoted his great oratorical and other talents to forwarding the cause of Catholic emancipation, and his influence was specially marked in his own county of Waterford, while his standing among his associates was shown by his being chosen to write the address to the people of England.

In 1830, after the passing of the Roman Catholic Relief Act 1829, he was returned to parliament for County Tipperary. He attached himself to the Whig Party and voted for the great measures of the reform era. But he was specially anxious to secure some improvement in the education of the Irish people, and some of his proposals were accepted by Edward Stanley, later 14th Earl of Derby, and the government, he was chairman of a committee which inquired into the condition of education in Ireland, and it was partly owing to his efforts that provincial colleges were established at Cork, Galway and Belfast.

His work as an educational pioneer also bore fruit in England, where the principles of state control and inspection, for which he had fought, were adopted, and where a training college for teachers at Battersea was established on lines suggested by him. From 1835 to 1847 he was MP for the Waterford City constituency, from 1839 to 1841 he was a Lord of the Treasury, from 1846 to 1849 he was Secretary to the Board of Control, and in 1849 he was sent as British minister to Greece. In that capacity he was a major figure in the notorious Don Pacifico Incident. He was very successful in his diplomacy, and he showed a great interest in the educational and other internal affairs of Greece. In 1857, he was made a KCB, and he died at Athens on 16 April 1862.

Wyse wrote Historical Sketch of the late Catholic Association of Ireland (London 1829), Education reform or the necessity of a national system of education (London 1836), An Excursion in the Peloponnesus (1858, new ed. 1865), and Impressions of Greece (London 1871).

His two sons shared his literary tastes: They were Napoleon Alfred Bonaparte-Wyse (1822–1895) and William Charles Bonaparte-Wyse (1826–1892), a student of the dialect of Provence. The marriage to his wife Laetitia, thirteen years younger than he and only sixteen years old when the wedding took place, did not last. After an especially violent fight in 1824 (so fierce that their carriage rocked on its springs), she fled to a convent and asked for a separation. Wyse and Laetitia got a papal order of seclusion in the convent. After eight months, when Wyse threatened to leave Italy without her, she submitted and travelled to Ireland with him.

However the arguments continued and in May 1828, they agreed to a separation. Laetitia threw herself in a suicide attempt into the Serpentine and was rescued by Captain Studholme John Hodgson (1805–1890), a British Army officer who became her lover. They had three children who survived to adulthood: the writer Marie Laetitia Bonaparte-Wyse (1831–1902, called secretly Studholmina-Maria) who was known as Princess Marie de Solms in her first marriage; Adeline (1838–1899), who married in 1861 the Hungarian general István Türr; and the explorer Lucien Napoléon Bonaparte-Wyse (1845–1909). All of them married and left children; all the children of Captain Hodgson and Princess Laetitia used the surname Bonaparte-Wyse.

Wyse was the subject of a biography written by James Auchmuty, Sir Thomas Wyse, 1791–1862: the life and career of an educator and diplomat, London 1939.

== Family and children ==
Wyse married Princess Laetitia Bonaparte (Milan, 1 December 1804 – Viterbo, 15 March 1871), daughter of Lucien Bonaparte and his second wife Alexandrine de Bleschamp, in Canino on 4 March 1821. Their children were:

- Napoleon Alfred Bonaparte-Wyse, Esq. (Rome, 1822 – Paris, 1895), unmarried and without issue;
- William Charles Bonaparte-Wyse (Waterford, 1826 - Cannes, 1892);
- Marie Laetitia Bonaparte-Wyse (Waterford, 1831 - Paris, 1902);
- Adelina Bonaparte Wyse (Waterford, 1838 – Berck, 1899), married in Mantua in 1861 to István Türr (Baja, 1825 - 1908);
- Lucien Napoléon Bonaparte-Wyse (Paris, 1845 - 1909).

Though legally his children, Marie Laetitia, Adeline and Lucien Napoléon were the biological children of Bonaparte and her lover, Captain Studholme John Hodgson.

== Sources ==
- Paz, D. G. "Wyse, Sir Thomas (1791–1862)". Oxford Dictionary of National Biography (online ed.). Oxford University Press. doi:10.1093/ref:odnb/30176. (Subscription, Wikipedia Library access or UK public library membership required.)

Parliament of the United Kingdom
Preceded by Francis Aldborough Prittie; John Hely Hutchinson	Member of Parliament for County Tipperary; 1830 – 1832; With: Francis Aldborough Prittie to 1831; John Hely Hutchinson 1831–32; Robert Otway-Cave 1832	Succeeded by Cornelius O'Callaghan; Richard Lalor Sheil
Preceded by William Christmas; Henry Barron	Member of Parliament for Waterford City; 1835 – 1841; With: Henry Barron	Succeeded by William Christmas; William Morris Reade
Preceded by William Christmas; William Morris Reade	Member of Parliament for Waterford City; June 1842 – 1847; With: Henry Barron	Succeeded by Thomas Meagher; Daniel O'Connell
Political offices
Preceded by Edward Adolphus Seymour; Robert Stewart; Richard More O'Ferrall; John Parker	Junior Lord of the Treasury; 1839–1841	Succeeded by James Milnes Gaskell; Henry Bingham Baring; Alexander Pringle; John Young
Preceded by Viscount Mahon	Secretary to the Board of Control; 1846–1849	Succeeded by John Edmund Elliot
Diplomatic posts
Preceded by Sir Edmund Lyons, Bt	British Minister to Greece; 1849–1862	Succeeded by Peter Campbell Scarlett
