= Thomas Francis Meagher =

Irish nationalist and American Union army officer (1823–1867)

General Thomas Francis Meagher
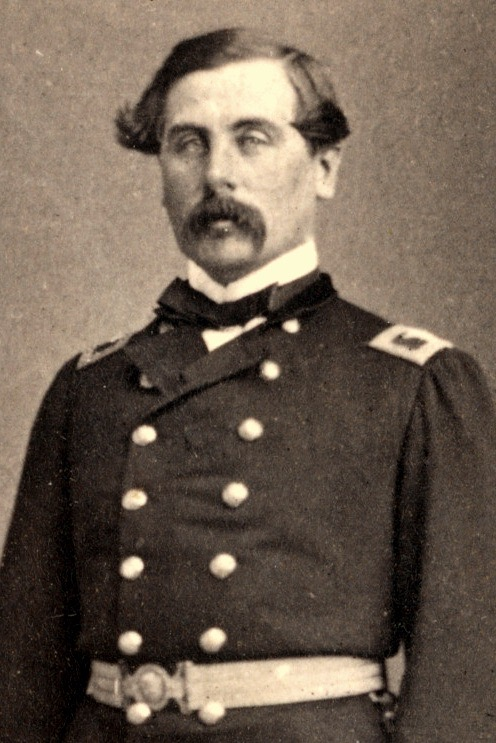
- Meagher (1860s) in his formal military uniform

Territorial Secretary of Montana Acting Territorial Governor of Montana
- In office September 1865 – 3 October 1866
- Preceded by: Sidney Edgerton
- Succeeded by: Green Clay Smith
- In office December 1866 – 1 July 1867
- Preceded by: Green Clay Smith
- Succeeded by: Green Clay Smith

Personal details
- Born: 3 August 1823 Waterford, County Waterford, Ireland
- Died: 1 July 1867 (aged 43) Missouri River, Montana Territory
- Party: Irish Confederation (Ireland); Democratic (U.S.)
- Spouse(s): Catherine Bennett (1851–1854; her death); Elizabeth Townsend (1856–1867; his death)
- Children: 2
- Nickname(s): Meagher of the Sword; O'Meagher (self given)

Military service
- Allegiance: Young Ireland; Irish Confederation; United States
- Branch/service: United States Army
- Years of service: 1848 (Young Irelanders); 1861–1865 (USA)
- Rank: Brigadier General
- Commands: Company K, 69th New York Militia; Irish Brigade
- Battles/wars: Young Irelander Rebellion of 1848; American Civil War; First Battle of Bull Run; Peninsula Campaign; Battle of Antietam; Battle of Fredericksburg; Battle of Chancellorsville

Thomas Francis Meagher (/mɑːr/ MAR; 3 August 1823 – 1 July 1867) was an Irish nationalist and leader of the Young Irelanders in the Rebellion of 1848. After being convicted of sedition, he was first sentenced to death but received transportation for life to Van Diemen's Land (now Tasmania) in Australia.

In 1852, Meagher escaped and made his way to the United States, where he settled in New York City. He studied law, worked as a journalist, and traveled to present lectures on the Irish cause.

The widower married for a second time in New York. At the beginning of the American Civil War, Meagher joined the U.S. Army and rose to the rank of brigadier general. He was most notable for recruiting and leading the Irish Brigade and encouraging support among Irish immigrants for the Union. By his first marriage in Ireland, he had one surviving son; the two never met.

Following the Civil War, Meagher was appointed Montana's Territorial Secretary of State by President Andrew Johnson and served as acting territorial governor. In 1867, Meagher drowned in the Missouri River after falling from a steamboat at Fort Benton, Montana. Historians have questioned the circumstances around his death, with varying hypotheses including weakness from dysentery, intoxication, suicide, and murder. A 2016 analysis by Timothy Egan in The Immortal Irishman suggested Meagher may have been murdered by Montana political opponents.

== Family ==
Thomas Francis Meagher was born on 3 August 1823 in Waterford City in what is now the Granville Hotel on the Quay. From the age of two he lived with his family at Derrynane House in nearby Number 19, The Mall.

His father, Thomas Meagher (1796–1874), was a rich merchant who had retired to enter politics. He was twice elected Mayor of the city, which he represented in Parliament from August 1847 to March 1857. He had lived in the city since he was a young man, having migrated from Newfoundland in present-day Canada.

The senior Meagher was born in St John's, Newfoundland. His father, also named Thomas (1763–1837), had emigrated as a young man from County Tipperary just before the turn of the 18th century. Starting as a farmer, the grandfather Meagher became a trader, and advanced to merchant, and shipowner. Newfoundland was the only British colony where people of Irish descent constituted a majority of the population. The senior Thomas Meagher married a widow, Mary Crotty. He established a prosperous trade between St. John's and Waterford, Ireland. Later, the grandfather placed his eldest son Thomas in Waterford to represent their business interests. The son Thomas became a successful merchant in Waterford, whose economic success was followed by political office.

Thomas Francis Meagher's mother, Alicia Quan (1798–1827), was the second eldest daughter of Thomas Quan and Alicia Forristall. Her father was a partner in the trading and shipping firm known as Wye, Cashen and Quan of Waterford. She died when Meagher was three and a half years old, after the birth of twin girls. (One of the girls also died then; the other at age seven.) Meagher had four siblings; a brother Henry and three sisters. Only he and his older sister Christine Mary Meagher lived past childhood.

== Early life and education ==
Meagher was educated at Roman Catholic boarding schools. When Meagher was eleven, his family sent him to the Jesuits at Clongowes Wood College in County Kildare. It was at Clongowes that he developed his skill of oratory, becoming at age 15 the youngest medalist of the Debating Society. These oratory skills would later distinguish Meagher during his years as a leading figure in Irish Nationalism. Although he gained a broad and deep education at Clongowes, as was typical, it did not include much about the history of his country or matters relating to Ireland.

After six years, Meagher left Ireland for the first time, to study in Lancashire, England, at Stonyhurst College, also a Jesuit institution. Meagher's father regarded Trinity College, the only university in Ireland, as being both anti-Irish and anti-Catholic.

The younger Meagher established a reputation for developed scholarship and "rare talents." While Meagher was at Stonyhurst, his English professors struggled to overcome his "horrible Irish brogue"; he acquired an Anglo-Irish upper-class accent that in turn grated on the ears of some of his countrymen. He became a popular speaker "who had no compare" in Conciliation Hall, the meeting place of the Irish Repeal Association.

The white in the centre signifies a lasting truce between the 'Orange' and the 'Green', and I trust that beneath its folds the hands of the Irish Protestant and the Irish Catholic may be clasped in generous and heroic brotherhood.

— Thomas Francis Meagher: On presenting the flag to the people of Dublin April 1848

== Young Ireland ==
Meagher returned to Ireland in 1843, with undecided plans for a career in the Austrian army, a tradition among a number of Irish families.

In 1844 he traveled to Dublin with the intention of studying for the bar in order to become a lawyer. He became involved in the Repeal Association, which worked for repeal of the Act of Union between Great Britain and Ireland. Meagher was influenced by writers of The Nation newspaper and fellow workers in the Repeal movement.

The movement became nationwide. At a Repeal meeting held in Waterford on 13 December, at which his father presided, Meagher acted as one of the Secretaries. He soon became popular on Burgh Quay, his eloquence at meetings making him a celebrated figure in the capital. Any announcement of Meagher's speaking would ensure a crowded hall.

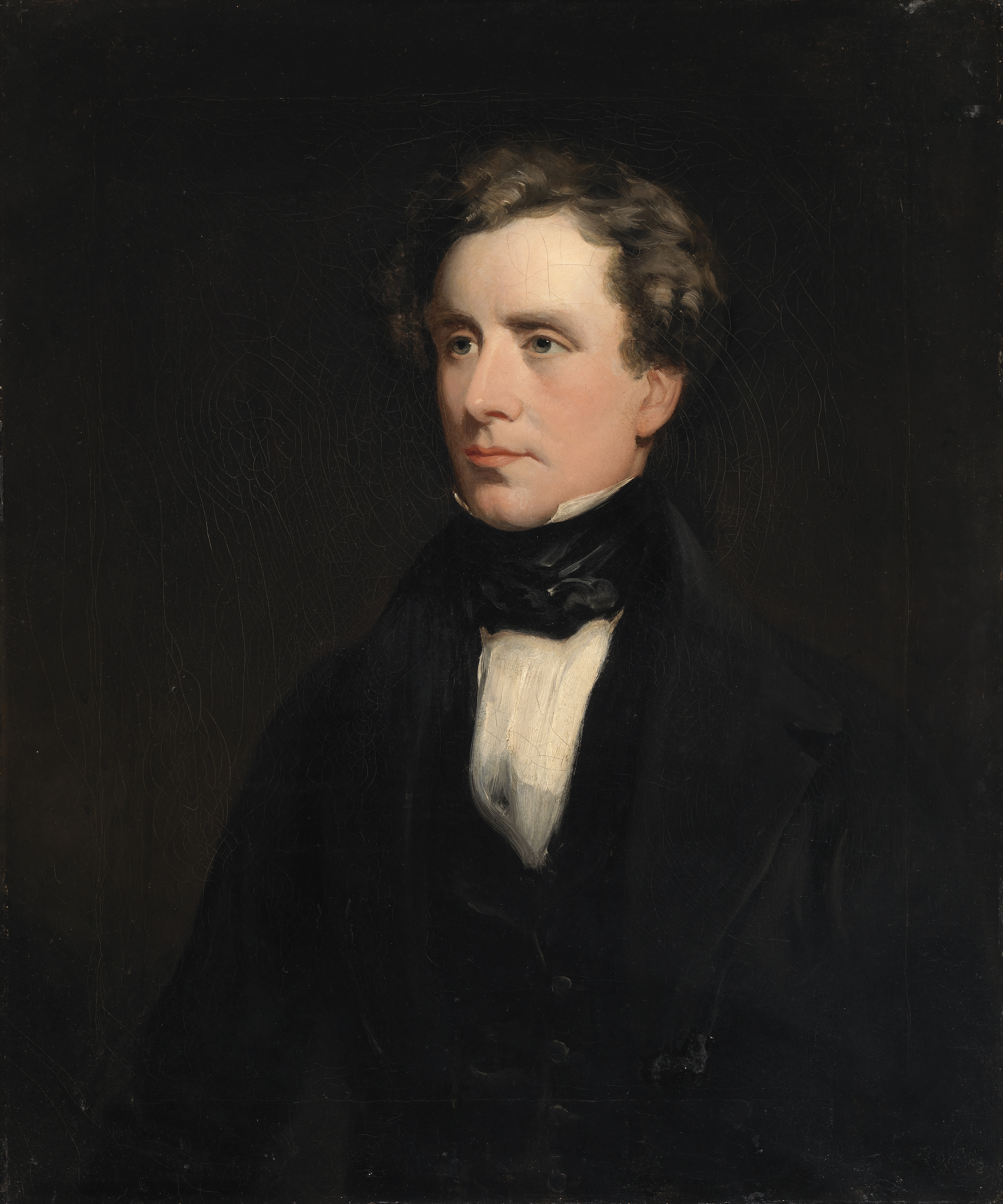
Portrait of Meagher c. 1845

In June 1846, the administration of Sir Robert Peel's Tory Ministry fell, and the Liberals under Lord John Russell came to power. Daniel O'Connell tried to lead the Repeal movement to support both the Russell administration and English Liberalism. Repeal agitation was damped down in return for a distribution of generous patronage through Conciliation Hall.

On 15 June 1846, Meagher denounced English Liberalism in Ireland, as he suspected the national cause of Repeal would be sacrificed to the Whig government. He felt the Irish would be "purchased back into factious vassalage." Meagher and the other "Young Irelanders" (the epithet used by O'Connell to describe the young men of The Nation) vehemently denounced any movement toward English political parties, so long as Repeal was denied.

The promise of patronage and influence divided the Repeal Movement. Those who hoped to gain by government positions, also called The "Tail", and described as the "corrupt gang of politicians who fawned on O'Connell" wanted to drive the genuinely ecumenical Young Irelanders from the Repeal Association. Such opponents portrayed the ecumenical Young Irelanders as revolutionaries, factionists, infidels and secret enemies of the Catholic Church. On 13 July, O'Connell's followers introduced resolutions to declare that under no circumstances was a nation justified in asserting its liberties by force of arms.

In fact, the Young Irelanders had not, until then, advocated the use of physical force to advance the cause of repeal and opposed any such policy. The "Peace Resolutions" declared that physical force was immoral under any circumstances to obtain national rights. Although Meagher agreed that only moral and peaceful means should be adopted by the Association, he added that if Repeal could not be carried by those means, he would adopt the more perilous and risky, but no less honorable choice of arms. When the Peace resolutions were proposed again on 28 July, Meagher responded with his famous "Sword Speech".

Meagher dissented from the Resolutions, not wanting to pledge to the unqualified repudiation of physical force "in all countries, at all times, and in every circumstance". He knew there were times when arms would suffice, and when political amelioration called for "a drop of blood, and many thousand drops of blood". He "eloquently defended physical force as an agency in securing national freedom."

As Meagher carried the audience to his side, O'Connell's supporters believed they were at risk in not being able to drive out the Young Irelanders. O'Connell's son John interrupted Meagher to declare that one of them had to leave the hall. William Smith O'Brien protested against this attempt to suppress legitimate speech and left the meeting with other prominent Young Irelanders in defiance, never to return.

== Irish Confederation ==
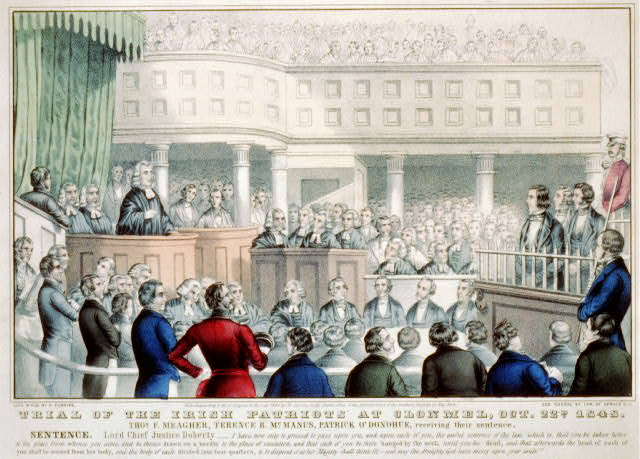
Trial at Clonmel of Meagher, Terence MacManus, and Patrick O'Donoghue, all sentenced to death

Plaque commemorating Meagher's arrest at 19 The Mall, Waterford, 12 July 1848

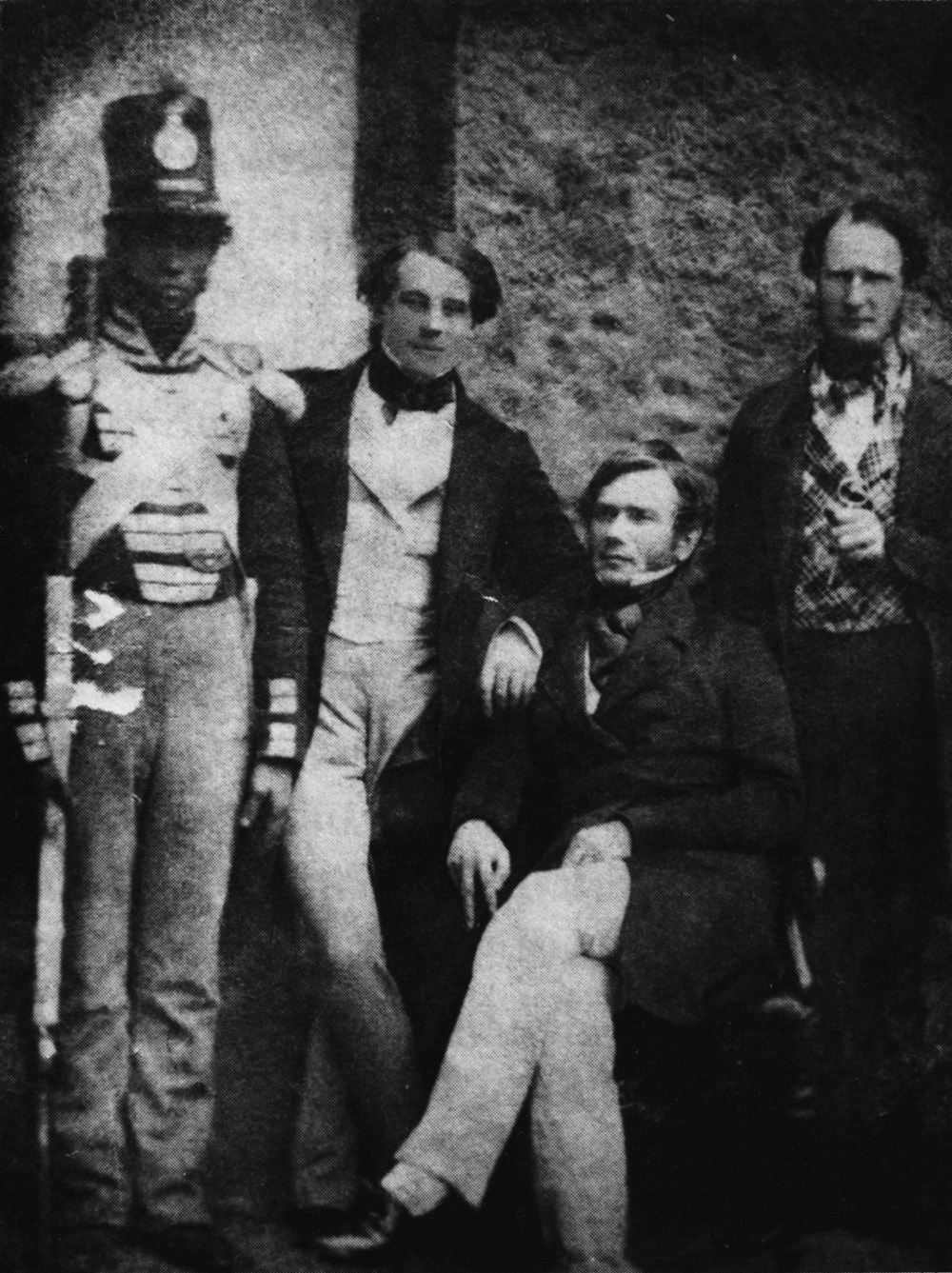
Daguerreotype of Thomas Francis Meagher and William Smith O'Brien with soldier and jailer in Kilmainhaim Gaol, 1848

In January 1847, Meagher, together with John Mitchel, William Smith O'Brien, and Thomas Devin Reilly formed a new repeal body, the Irish Confederation. In 1848, Meagher and O'Brien went to France to seek French support for Irish efforts, the group planning a rebellion that would secure an Irish legislative. The group did not receive the support desired, France tending to its own affairs and unwilling to anger the British government. The group did return to Ireland with a version of what would later become the Flag of Ireland, a tricolour of green, white and orange. This was not a new symbol, having been flown popularly in the 1830s in flag, banner and rosette form following its creation in Dublin by Emelia Eleanor Hamilton, of Annadale Cottage, Dublin in September 1830. However, the groups later adoption of the symbol gave the device a 'rebel edge' which was important in its later adoption by Fenian groups like Clan na Gael and the Irish Republican Brotherhood.

Following the incident known as the Young Irelander Rebellion of 1848 or "Battle of Ballingarry" in August 1848, Meagher, Terence MacManus, O'Brien, and Patrick O'Donoghue were arrested, tried and convicted for sedition. Due to a newly passed ex post facto law, the sentence meant that Meagher and his colleagues were sentenced to be "hanged, drawn and quartered". It was after his trial that Meagher delivered his famous Speech From the Dock.

While awaiting execution in Richmond Gaol, Meagher and his colleagues were joined by Kevin Izod O'Doherty and John Martin. But, due to public outcry and international pressure, royal clemency commuted the death sentences to penal exile for life to "the other side of the world".

In 1849 all were sent to Van Diemen's Land (Tasmania, Australia). On July 20, the day after being notified of his exile to Van Diemen's Land, Meagher announced that he wished henceforth to be known as Thomas Francis O'Meagher.

== Van Diemen's Land ==
My Lord, this is our first offense, but not our last. If you will be easy with us this once, we promise on our word as gentlemen to try better next time.

— Thomas Francis Meagher: Promising the judge before passing sentence

Meagher accepted the "ticket-of-leave" in Van Diemen's Land (Tasmania), giving his word not to attempt to escape without first notifying the authorities, in return for comparative liberty on the island. A further stipulation was that each of the Irish "gentleman" convicts was sent to reside in separate districts: Meagher to Campbell Town and shortly after to Ross (where his cottages still stand); MacManus to Launceston and later near New Norfolk; Kevin O'Doherty to Oatlands; John Mitchel and John Martin to Bothwell; and O'Brien (who initially refused a ticket-of-leave) to the "Penal Station" on Maria Island and later to New Norfolk. During his time in Van Diemen's Land, Meagher managed to meet clandestinely with his fellow Irish rebels, especially at Interlaken on Lake Sorell.

== Marriages and family ==
On 22 February 1851, in Van Diemen's Land, Meagher married Catherine Bennett, daughter of Bryan Bennett, a farmer who, in 1817, had been convicted of mail robbery and in 1818 transported to Van Diemen's Land. Meagher's fellow exiles disapproved of his marriage because she was a "dead-common girl", or the child of a common criminal. Although his friends believed her social status made them an unsuitable match, Meagher was unperturbed, and he and his wife lived in a house Meagher built on the shore of Lake Sorell. Soon after they were married, Catherine became ill.

Less than a year after his wedding in January 1852, Meagher abruptly surrendered his "ticket-of-leave" and planned his escape to the United States. Meagher sent his "ticket-of-leave" and a letter to the authorities, along with notifying them he would consider himself a free man in twenty-four hours. When he escaped, Catherine was in an advanced stage of pregnancy and stayed behind. Following Meagher's departure from Van Diemen's Land, their son, Henry Emmett Fitzgerald O'Meagher, was born, but he died at 4 months of age, shortly after Meagher reached New York City.

Henry Emmett Fitzgerald O'Meagher was buried on 8 June 1852 at St. John's Catholic Church, the oldest Catholic church in Australia, in Richmond, Tasmania, Australia. The small grave is next to the church. A plaque notes his father having been an Irish Patriot and member of the Young Irelanders.

Following Meagher's escape, Catherine travelled to London, where she was met by her father-in-law and then they both travelled on to Waterford. On arrival at Waterford railway station, she was welcomed by thousands of citizens, such was her husband's fame in Ireland as a nationalist. However, she was not well and rested at her father-in-law's home for a short time (where a crowd of 20,000 'serenaded' her). Eventually she was able to spend a short time in the United States with Meagher. She returned to Ireland pregnant and in poor health. She gave birth to Meagher's only child to reach adulthood: Thomas Bennett Meagher, named after his father. She died in Ireland on 12 May 1854, at the home of her father-in-law. Meagher never met his son, who was raised by relatives.

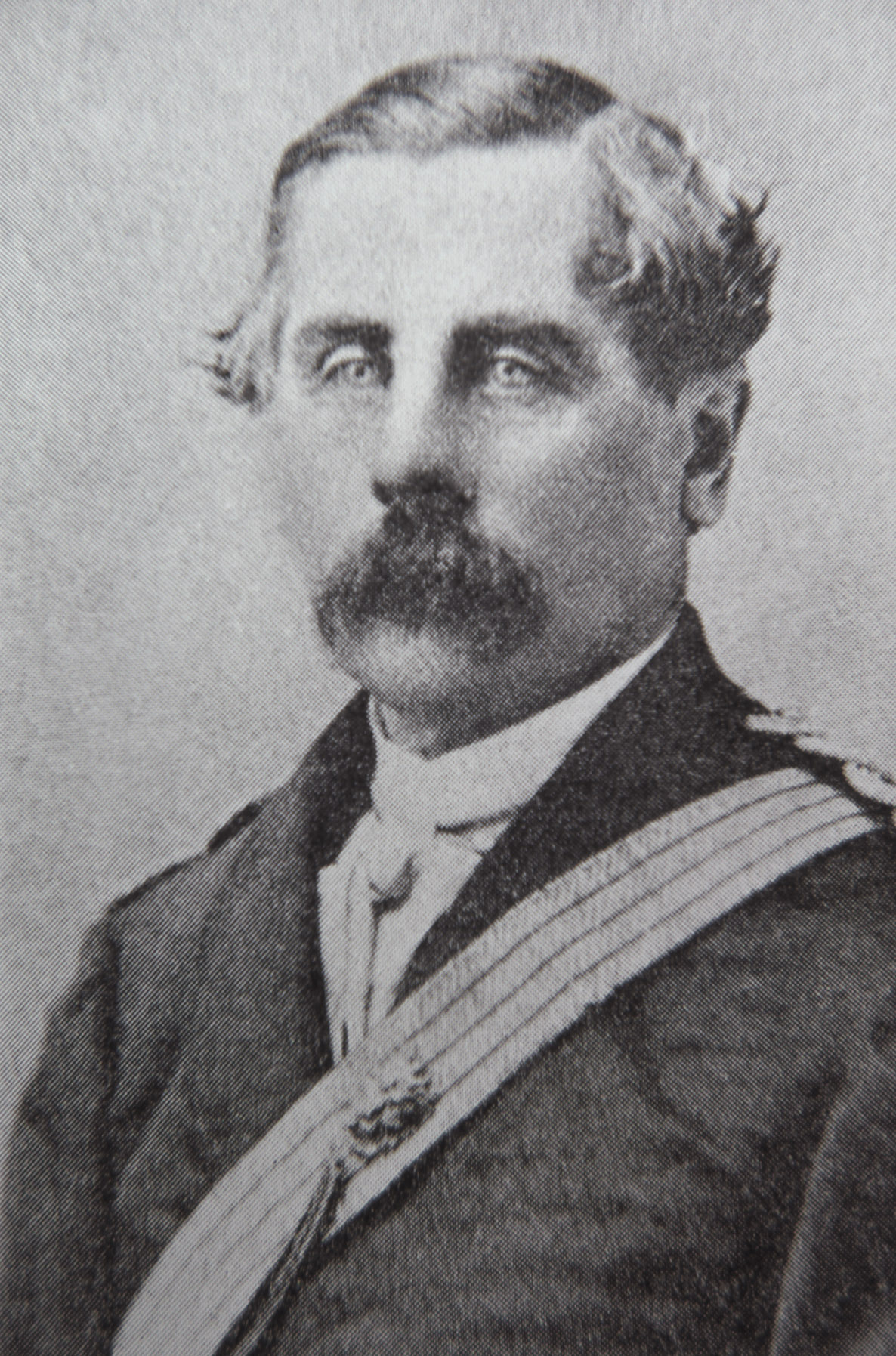
Meagher in the 1860s

After Meagher settled in New York, he soon courted Elizabeth "Libby" Townsend (1830–1906), the daughter of Peter Townsend and Caroline (née) Parrish of Monroe, New York. The Townsend family were wealthy Protestants, who opposed Meagher's marrying their daughter but eventually relented. Elizabeth converted to Roman Catholicism, and, in 1856, she and Meagher married.

== Immigration to the United States ==
Meagher arrived in New York City in May 1852. He studied law and journalism, and became a noted lecturer. Soon after, Meagher became a United States citizen. He eventually founded a weekly newspaper called the Irish News. Meagher and John Mitchel, who had also since escaped, published the radical pro-Irish independence Citizen. After his escape, the question of "honor" was raised by Mitchel, among others. Meagher agreed to be "tried" by American notables, and vowed to return to Van Diemen's Land if they held against him. The simulated court martial found for Meagher, and he was vindicated.

Prior to the outbreak of the American Civil War, Meagher traveled to Costa Rica, in part to determine whether Central America would be suitable for Irish immigration. He used his experiences as the basis for writing travel articles which were published in Harper's Magazine. He was commissioned as a captain in the New York State Militia.

== American Civil War ==
It is not only our duty to America, but also to Ireland. We could not hope to succeed in our effort to make Ireland a Republic without the moral and material support of the liberty-loving citizens of these United States.

— Thomas Francis Meagher, On deciding to fight for the Union

Meagher's decision to serve the Union was not a simple one; before the onset of the war, he had supported the South. He had visited the South to lecture, and was sympathetic to its people. Further, his Irish friend John Mitchel, who had settled in the South, supported the secessionists. Meagher and Mitchel split over the issue of slavery. Mitchel went to the Confederate capitol in Richmond, Virginia, and his three sons served with the Confederate States Army.

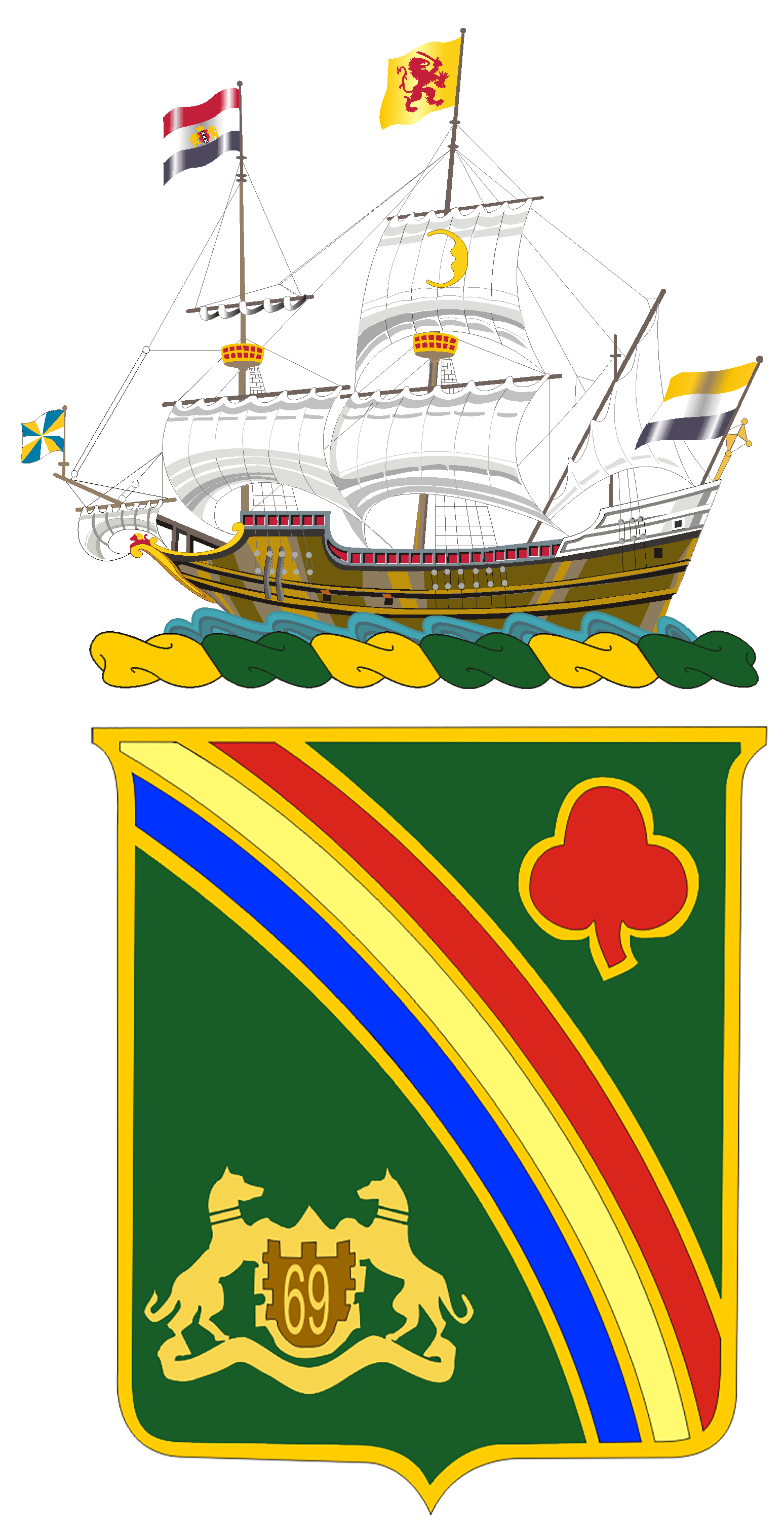
Coat of arms of the 69th New York Militia

On 12 April 1861, the first shots were fired at U.S.-held Fort Sumter in Charleston Harbor, South Carolina. This action by the South pushed Meagher into support of the Union cause.

He began recruiting men for the Union Army. One of his ads in the New York Daily Tribune read: "One hundred young Irishman—healthy, intelligent and active—wanted at once to form a Company under command of Thomas Francis Meagher." On April 29, his recruits were enlisted as Company K of the 69th Infantry Regiment of the New York State Militia (the "Fighting 69th"). Under the command of Colonel Michael Corcoran, another leading Irish political figure, the 69th fought in the First Battle of Bull Run, a Confederate victory. Corcoran was captured, and Meagher succeeded him as colonel.

After Bull Run, Meagher returned to New York to form the Irish Brigade. In lectures, including a famous speech made at the Boston Music Hall in September 1861, he implored the Irish of the North to defend the Union. He was commissioned brigadier general (effective 3 February) to lead the Brigade in the Peninsula Campaign of 1862.

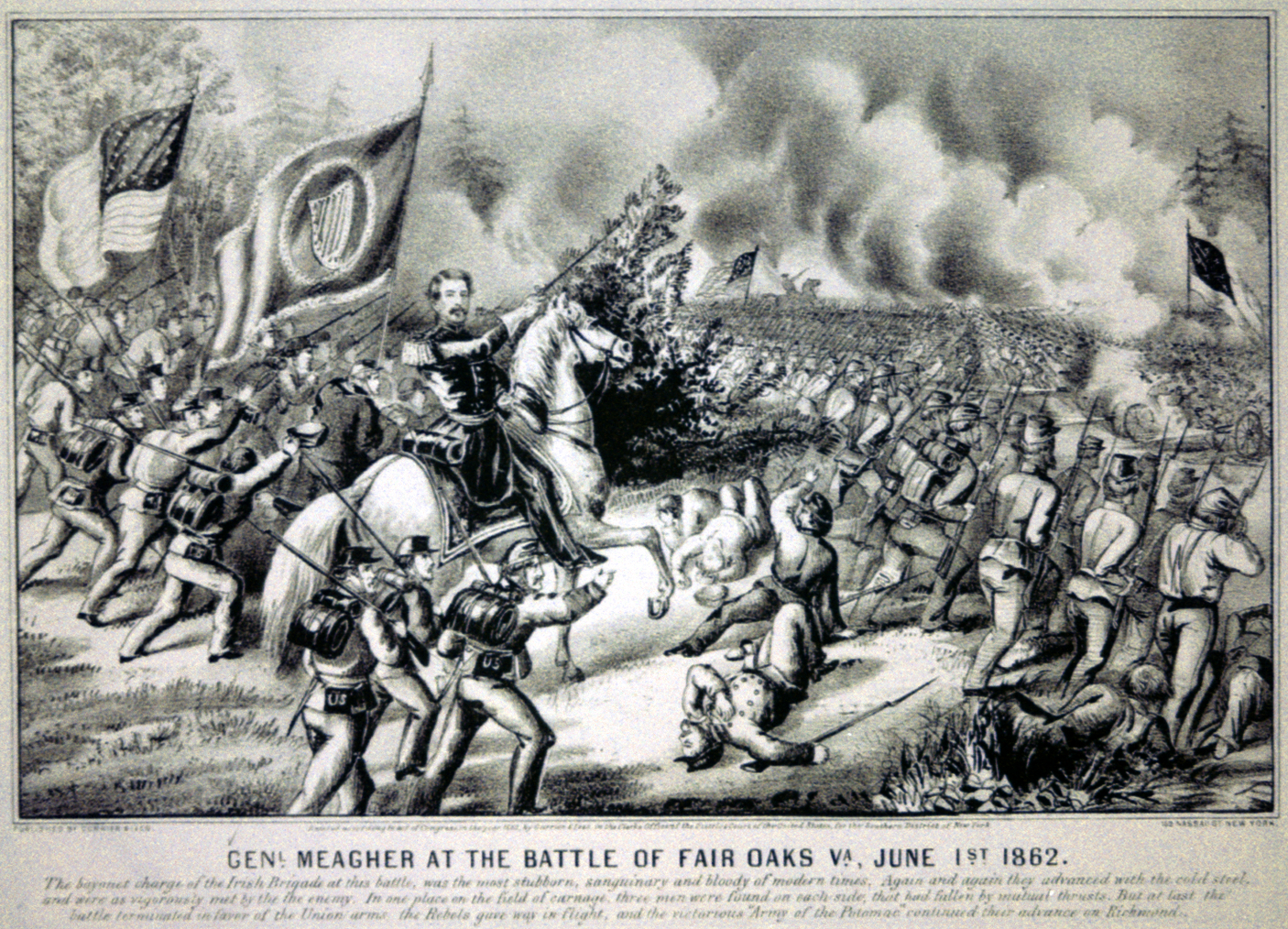
General Meagher at the Battle of Fair Oaks, 1 June 1862

At the Battle of Fair Oaks in May, Meagher first led the Brigade in battle. The Union won a defensive victory, and the Irish Brigade furthered their reputation as fierce fighters.

This reputation was solidified when the New York printmaker Currier and Ives published a lithograph depicting Meagher on horseback, leading his brigade in a bayonet charge. Following the Battle of Fair Oaks, Meagher was given command of a non-Irish regiment. This experiment was unsuccessful, and thereafter Meagher would command only Irishmen. Meagher's troops fought at the Battle of Gaines' Mill on 27 June. The Irish Brigade arrived in battle after a quick march through the Chickahominy River, as reinforcements for the weakening V Corps. Later, this march and battle were considered by historians as the highlight of Meagher's military career.

The Irish Brigade suffered huge losses at the Battle of Antietam that fall. Meagher's brigade led an attack at Antietam on September 17 against the Sunken Road (later referred to as "Bloody Lane") and lost 540 men to heavy volleys before being ordered to withdraw. During the battle, Meagher was injured when he fell off his horse. Some reports said Meagher had been drunk, but Maj. Gen. George B. McClellan's official report noted that Meagher's horse had been shot. Meagher had faced reports of drunkenness at the First Battle of Bull Run. The high number of casualties at Antietam, and the rumors of his being drunk on the battlefield, increased criticism of Meagher's command ability.

The Irish Brigade suffered its largest losses at the Battle of Fredericksburg. Brigade chaplain Father William Corby later said it was "a body of about 4,000 Catholic men marching – most of them – to death." Meagher led 1,200 men into battle, and "two hundred and eighty men only appeared under arms to represent the Irish Brigade" the next morning. Meagher took no direct part in this battle, remaining at the rear when his brigade began their advance, due to, what he described in his official report as 'a most painful ulcer in the knee joint'.

Meagher spent the next four months recovering from his injuries, and resumed his command three days prior to the Battle of Chancellorsville. After limited engagement at Chancellorsville, Meagher resigned his commission on 14 May 1863. The Army had refused his request to return to New York to raise reinforcements for his battered brigade. The brigade was 4,000 strong in mid–May 1862, but by late May 1863, it had only a few hundred combat-ready men left.

Meagher's fellow Irish leader, Col. Corcoran, had been exchanged and promoted Brigadier General, but he died in December 1863. So the Army rescinded Meagher's resignation on 23 December. He was assigned to duty in the Western Theater beginning in September 1864. He commanded the District of Etowah in the Department of the Cumberland from 29 November to 5 January 1865. Meagher briefly commanded a provisional division in the Army of the Ohio (9–25 February); he resigned from the Army on May 15.

== Territorial governorship of Montana ==
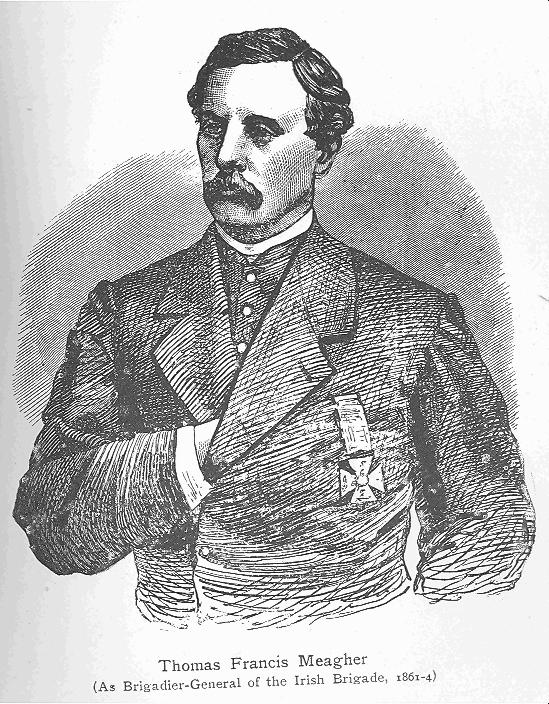
Brigadier General Thomas Francis Meagher

After the war, Meagher was appointed Secretary of the new Territory of Montana; soon after arriving there, he was designated Acting Governor.

Meagher attempted to create a working relationship between the territory's Republican executive and judicial branches, and the Democratic legislative branch. He failed, making enemies in both camps. Further, he angered many when he pardoned a fellow Irishman who had been convicted of manslaughter.

The Territory of Montana was created from the eastern portion of Idaho Territory as its population increased with an influx of settlers following the discovery of gold in 1862. When the Civil War ended, many more settlers entered the territory. Searching for riches, they often disregarded U.S. treaties with the local Native American tribes.

In 1867, Montana pioneer John Bozeman was allegedly killed by a band of Blackfeet, who attacked other settlers as well. Meagher responded by organizing the Montana Territory Volunteer Militia to retaliate. He secured funding from the federal government to campaign against the Native Americans, but was unable to find the offenders, or retain the militia's cohesion. He was later criticized for his actions.

Meagher called Montana's first constitutional convention to develop a constitution as a step toward statehood. Not enough residents voted for the constitution and statehood to qualify. In addition, copies of the constitution were lost on the way to a printer, and Congress never received copies for review. Montana gained statehood in 1889, more than 20 years after Meagher's death.

== Disappearance ==
In the summer of 1867, Meagher traveled to Fort Benton, Montana, to receive a shipment of guns and ammunition sent by General William Tecumseh Sherman for use by the Montana Militia. On the way to Fort Benton, the Missouri River terminus for steamboat travel, Meagher fell ill and stopped for six days to recuperate. When he reached Fort Benton, he was reportedly still ill.

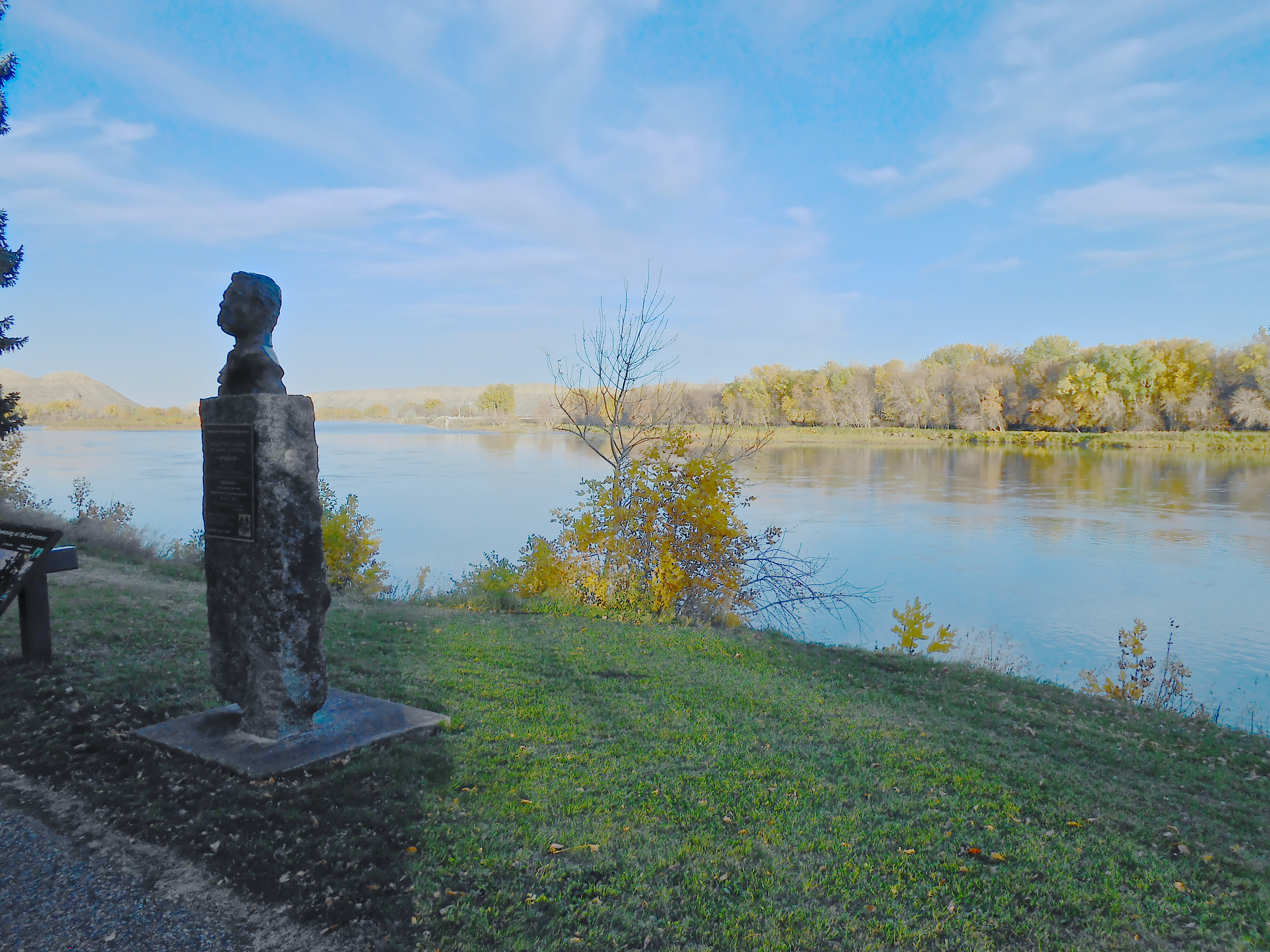
Memorial to Meagher near the location of his disappearance into the Missouri River, Fort Benton, Montana

Sometime in the early evening of 1 July 1867, Meagher fell overboard from the steamboat G. A. Thompson, into the Missouri River. The pilot described the waters as "instant death – water twelve feet deep and rushing at the rate of ten miles an hour." His body was never recovered.

Some believed his death to be suspicious and many theories circulated about his death. Early theories included a claim that he was murdered by a Confederate soldier from the war, or by Native Americans. In 1913 a man claimed to have carried out the murder of Meagher for the price of $8000, but then recanted. In the same vein, American journalist and novelist Timothy Egan, who published a biography of Meagher in 2016, noted that his political nemesis, Wilbur Fisk Sanders, was in Fort Benton at the same time. Egan wrote that the ship's captain stated that he was sober and ill and hypothesized that Meagher may have been set up for murder by his Montana political enemies or powerful and still active vigilantes.

In 2008, John T. Hubbell suggested that Meagher had been drinking and fell overboard. Other hypotheses included the possibility that he had been weakened by dysentery or that his fall was a suicide. A fictionalized account shown on Death Valley Days (1960) had him survive the assassination attempt because his aide had been mistakenly murdered when he accepted one of his trademark cigars; and Meagher used his seeming death as leverage over his political opponents.

Meagher was survived by his American second wife, Elizabeth "Libby" (née Townsend; 1840–1906). He was also survived by his second son by his first wife, Catherine.

== Legacy and honours ==
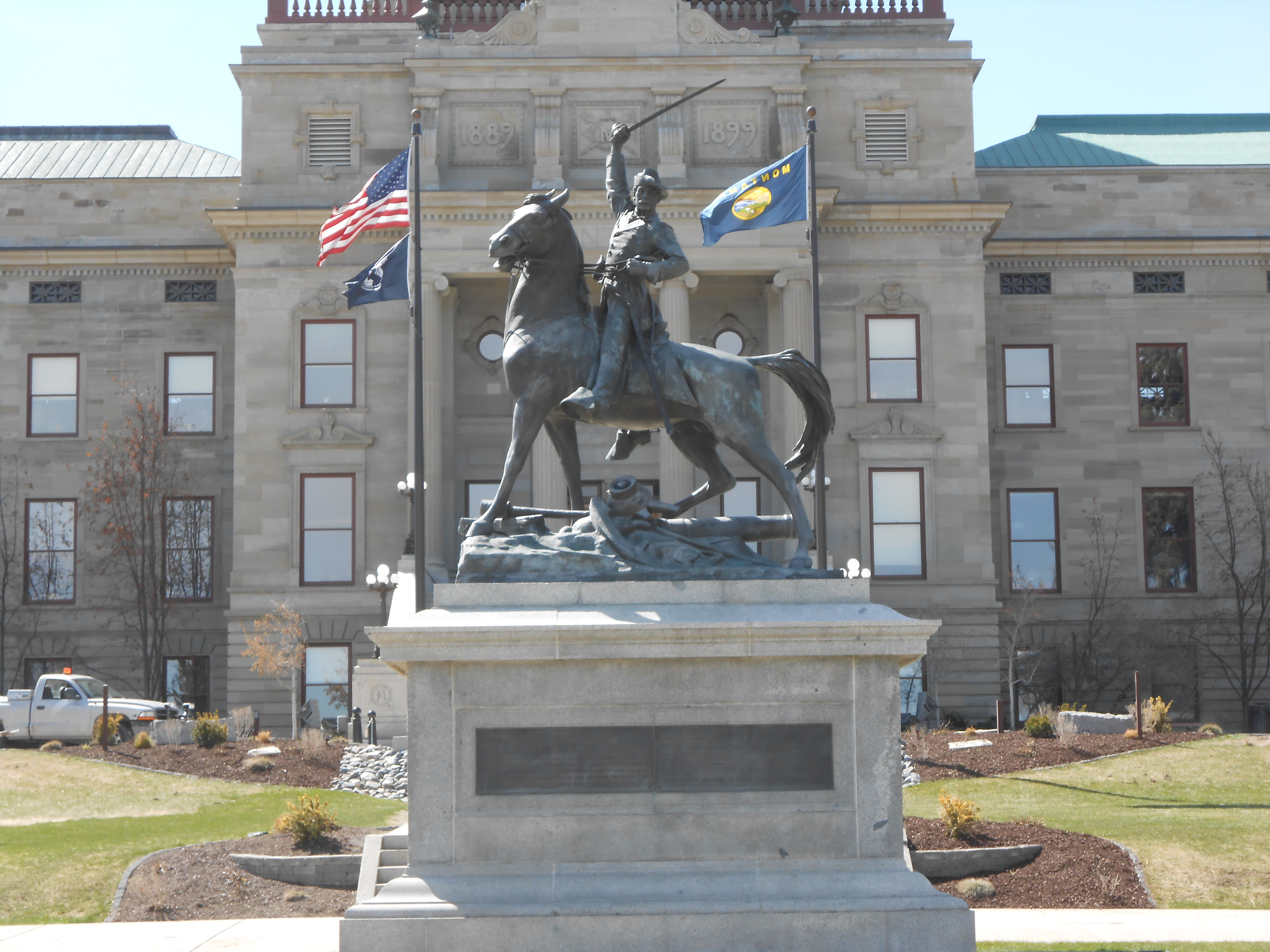
Statue of Meagher in front of the Montana state capitol building installed in 1905

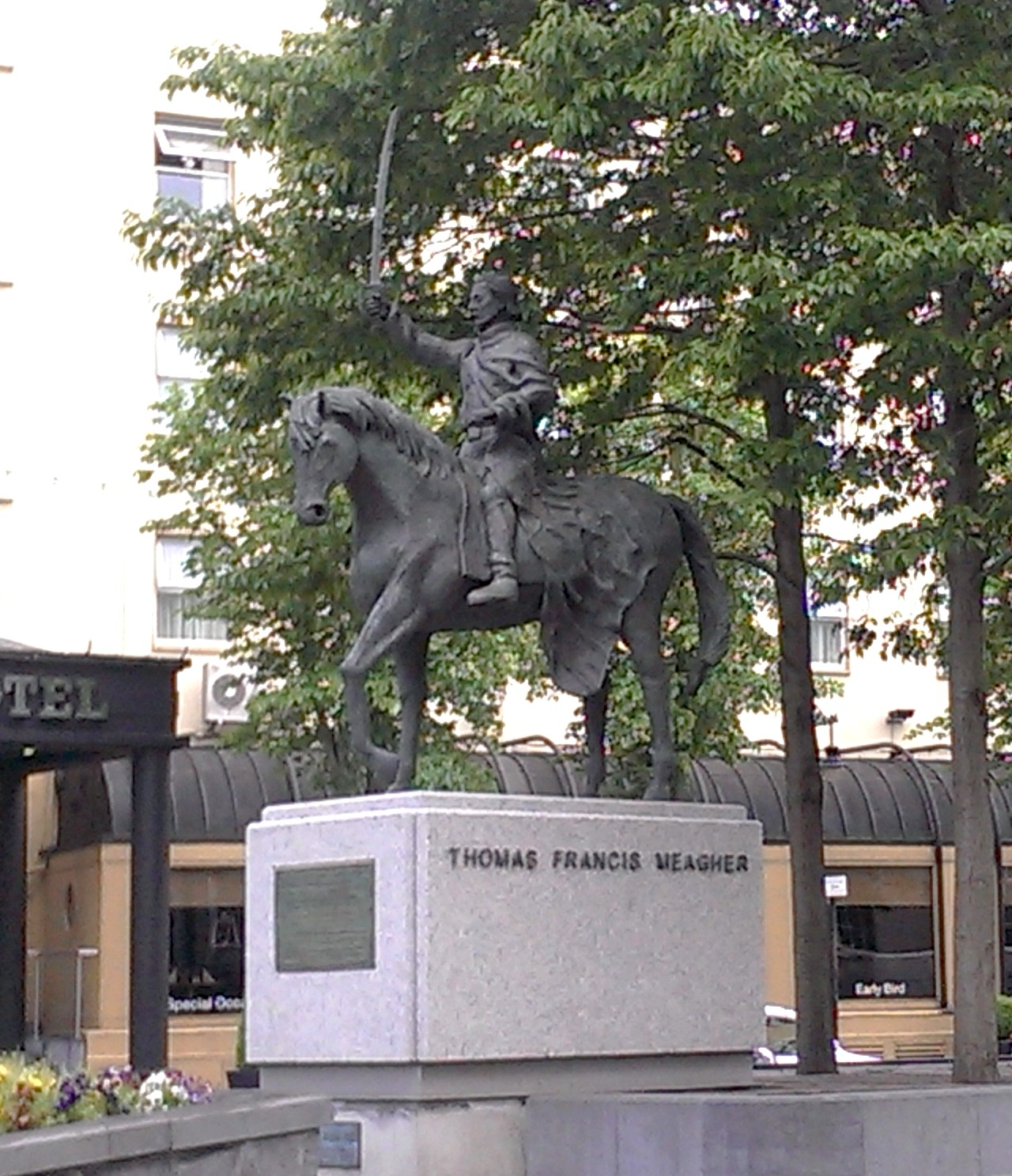
The statue of Meagher at the Mall in Waterford, Ireland, which was unveiled in 2004

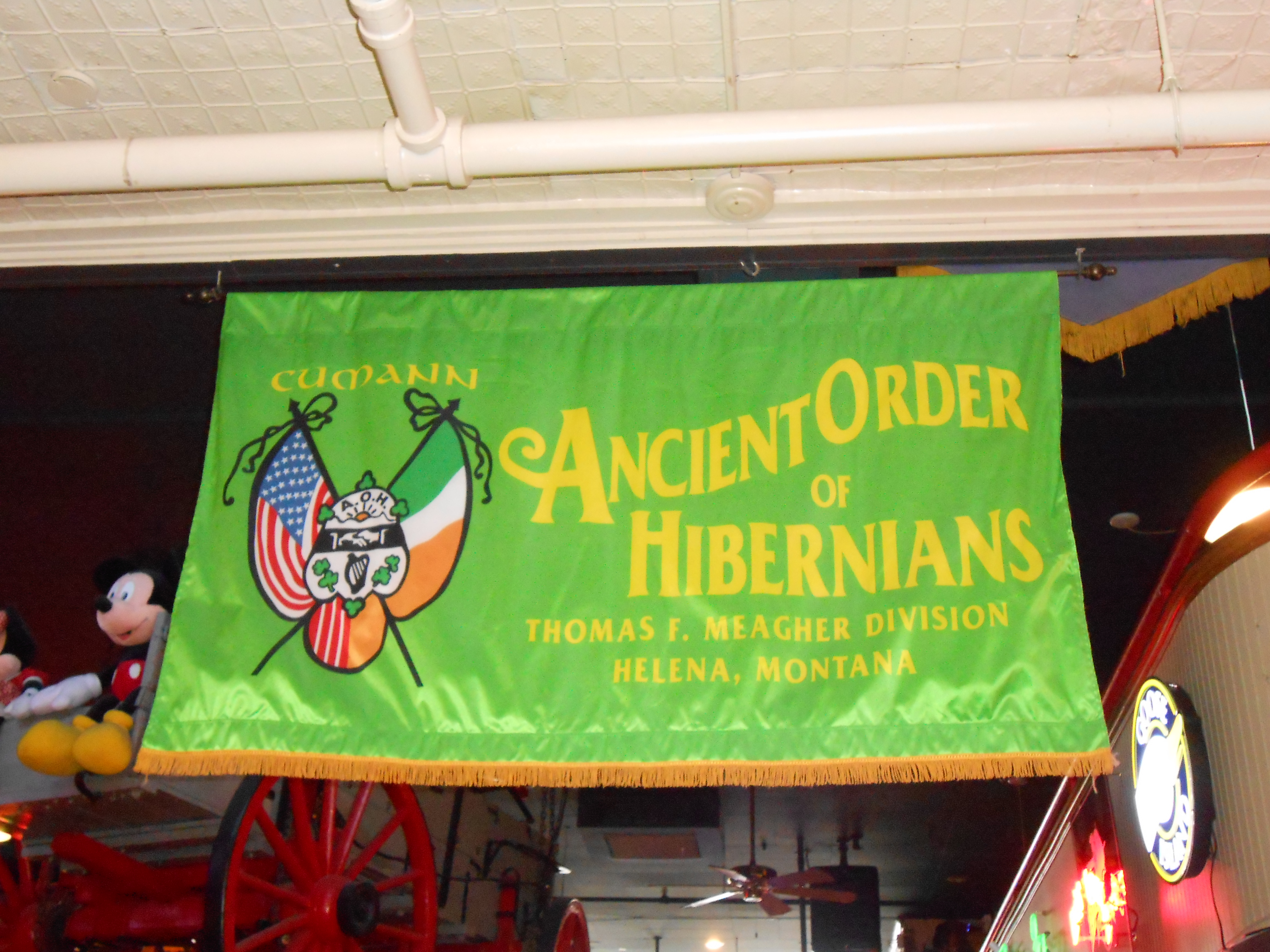
Helena, Montana Chapter of the Ancient Order of Hibernians Banner

- A statue of Meagher, on horseback with sword raised, is on the front lawn of the Montana State Capitol in Helena, created by Charles J. Mulligan, unveiled and dedicated on July 4, 1905.
- A similar statue honoring him was erected in 2004 in Waterford, Ireland near his childhood home at Number 19, The Mall.
- The actor Richard Webb was cast as Meagher in the 1960 episode "The General Who Disappeared" on the syndicated television anthology series, Death Valley Days, hosted by Stanley Andrews. In the story line, Meagher as acting governor of the Montana Territory seeks to clean up corrupt politics.
- In 1963, President Kennedy spoke of Meagher's legacy, leading the Irish Brigade into battle in the American Civil War. He presented the battle flag of the Brigade to the people of Ireland, and it hangs to this day in Leinster House, the location of the Irish Parliament.
- In 1982, the Ancient Order of Hibernians formed the Thomas Francis Meagher Division #1 in Helena, Montana, dedicated to the principles of the Order and to restoring a historically accurate record of Meagher's contributions to Montana.
- The military fort at Camden near Crosshaven, County Cork, was renamed Fort Meagher.
- Meagher County, Montana, was named for him.
- A monument at the Antietam battlefield was dedicated in his honor. The inscription on the granite monument reads:
  The Irish Brigade commander was born in Waterford City, Ireland on August 23, 1823; a well educated orator, he joined the young Ireland movement to liberate his nation. This led to his exile to a British Penal Colony in Tasmania Australia in 1849. He escaped to the United States in 1852 and became an American citizen. When the Civil War broke out, he raised Company K, Irish Zouaves, for the 69th New York State Militia Regiment, which fought at First Bull Run under Colonel Michael Corcoran. Subsequently Meagher raised the Irish Brigade and commanded it from February 3, 1862 to May 14, 1863 til later commanded a military district in Tennessee. After the War Meagher became Secretary and Acting Governor of the Montana Territory. He drowned in the Missouri River near Fort Benton on July 1, 1867. His body was never recovered.
- A cenotaph memorial to Meagher is located in Greenwood Cemetery, Brooklyn, New York, adjacent to the grave of his second wife.
- In the spring of 1867, the U.S. Army established a post near Rocky Creek, east of Bozeman, Montana, and named it Fort Elizabeth Meagher in honor of Meagher's second wife.
- At the New York-New York Hotel & Casino in Las Vegas, a statue depicting Meagher in uniform was dedicated near the Brooklyn Bridge directly facing the Las Vegas strip.
- On 3 December 1944, the Liberty Ship S.S. Thomas F. Meagher was launched.
- In March 2015, the Suir Bridge, crossing the river Suir outside Meagher's native Waterford, was renamed the Thomas Francis Meagher Bridge by the President of Ireland Michael D. Higgins.
- In December 1987, the General Thomas F. Meagher Division 1 of the City of Fredericksburg (Virginia) of the Ancient Order of Hibernians was formed.
- A memorial featuring a bust of Meagher was dedicated in 2009 on the bank of the Missouri River in Fort Benton, Montana, believed to be near the site of the riverboat where he was said to have fallen overboard.
- Missoula, Montana has named a Hurling Club and a downtown bar after Meagher.
- On 1 July 2017, marking 150 years since Thomas Francis Meagher's death, a bronze bust sculpted by Michael J. Keropian was dedicated to General Thomas Francis Meagher in Green-Wood Cemetery in Brooklyn, New York. The monument sits just in back of his wife's grave marker.

== See also ==
- List of convicts transported to Australia
- List of American Civil War generals (Union)
- Irish military diaspora

== Sources ==
- Akenson, Donald H. (2006). An Irish History of Civilization. McGill-Queen's Press-MQUP. ISBN 0-7735-2891-1.
- Bruce, Susannah Ural (2006). The Harp and the Eagle: Irish–American Volunteers and the Union Army, 1861–1865. NYU Press. ISBN 0-8147-9940-X.
- Cavanagh, Michael (1892). Gen. Thomas Francis Meagher—The Leading Events of his career. Worcester, MA: The Messenger Press.
- Doheny, Michael (1951). The Felon's Track. Dublin: M. H. Gill & Son.
- Duffy, Charles Gavan (1888). Four Years of Irish History 1845–1849. London: Cassell, Petter, Galpin & Co.
- Duffy, Charles Gavan (1880). Young Ireland. London: Cassell, Petter, Galpin & Co.
- Dungan, Myles (2006). How the Irish Won the West. Dublin: New Ireland. ISBN 978-1-905494-60-6.
- Egan, Timothy, The Immortal Irishman: The Irish Revolutionary Who Became an American Hero, HMH, 2016.
- Eicher, John H.; Simon, John Y. (2001). Civil War High Commands. Stanford University Press. ISBN 0-8047-3641-3.
- Griffith, Arthur (1916). Meagher of the Sword, :Speeches of Thomas Francis Meagher in Ireland 1846–1848. Dublin: M. H. Gill & Son, Ltd.
- Jones, Donald R. (2009). The Harp & The Eagle. Baltimore, MD: American Literary Press. ISBN 978-1-934696-40-8.
- Keneally, Thomas (1998). The Great Shame: And the Triumph of the Irish in the English-Speaking World. London: Chatto & Windus. ISBN 978-1-856197-88-5.
- Lonergan, Thomas S. (1913). Daly, Edward Hamilton (ed.). "General Thomas Francis Meagher". The Journal of the American–Irish Historical Society. XII. The Society: 111–26.
- Lyons, W.F. (1870). Brigadier-General Thomas Francis Meagher—His Political and Military Career. D. & J. Sadlier & Company.
- O'Sullivan, T.F. (1945). Young Ireland. The Kerryman Ltd.
- Ua Cellaigh, Seán; Sullivan, T.D.; Sullivan, A.M.; Sullivan, D.B. (1953). Speeches from the Dock. Dublin: M. H. Gill & Son.
- Wylie, Paul R. (2007). The Irish General: Thomas Francis Meagher. University of Oklahoma Press. ISBN 978-0-8061-3847-3.
