= Sir Henry Barron, 1st Baronet =

Irish baronet and politician

Sir Henry Barron, 1st Baronet DL
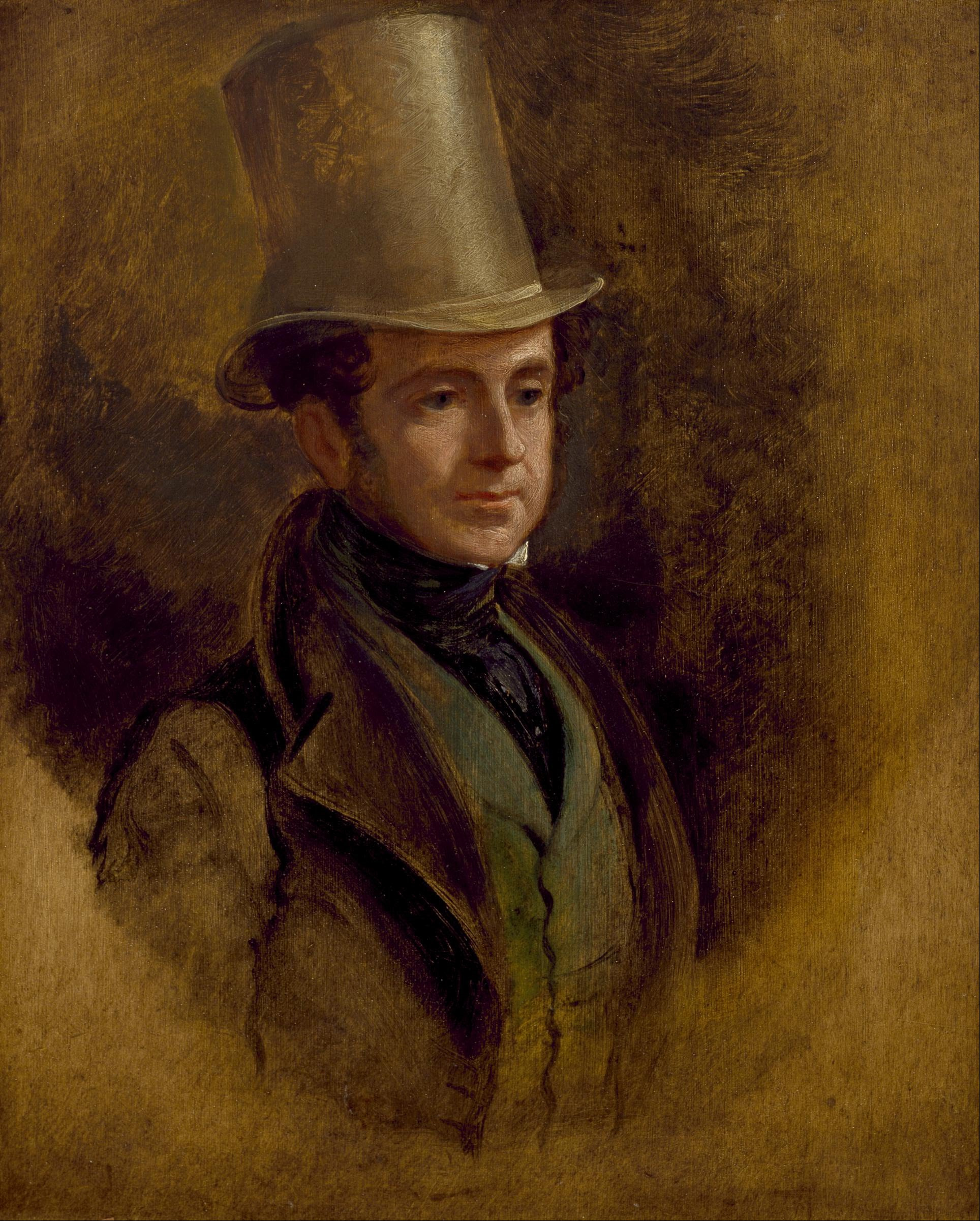

Member of Parliament for Waterford City
- In office: 1832–1841; 1842–1847; 1848–1852; 1865–1868; 1869–1870

High Sheriff of County Waterford
- In office 1858

Personal details
- Born: 15 October 1795 Ballymil, County Waterford, Ireland
- Died: 19 April 1872 (aged 76) Ferrybank, Waterford, Ireland
- Party: Liberal Party
- Other political affiliations: Repeal Association; Whigs
- Relations: Edward Barron (brother)
- Education: Trinity College Dublin

Sir Henry Winston Barron, 1st Baronet DL (15 October 1795 – 19 April 1872) was an Irish baronet and politician, who stood at nine different general elections.

== Background ==
Born at Ballymil in County Waterford, he was the son of Pierce Barron and his wife Anna, only daughter of Henry Winston. His younger brother was the bishop Edward Barron. Barron was educated at Trinity College Dublin.

== Career ==
He entered the British House of Commons for Waterford City in 1832, however he lost his seat in the general election of 1841. In October of the same year, he was created a baronet, of Bellevue, in the County of Kilkenny. A year later, both representatives for the constituency were unseated and Barron was returned to parliament until 1847. He was re-elected in 1848, sitting for the next four years. Barron was again successful in the general election of 1865 and represented Waterford City until 1868. Although he won the constituency's by-election in the following year, the result was declared void because of bribery in 1870. Barron served as High Sheriff of County Waterford for 1858 and also as a justice of the peace and a deputy lieutenant of the county.

== Family ==
On 1 May 1822, he married Anna Leigh Guy Page-Turner, the only daughter of Sir Gregory Page-Turner (1748–1805), Third Baronet. They had a son, Sir Henry Page-Turner Barron, 2nd Baronet (1824–1900), and a daughter, Emily Frances Barron (c. 1827–1913). His first wife died in 1852, and Barron married secondly Augusta Anna, youngest daughter of Lord Charles Somerset at St George's, Hanover Square on 1 August 1863. This marriage was childless.

Barron died aged 76 in 1872 and was buried at Ferrybank, Waterford. He was succeeded in the baronetcy by his son, who never married.

Emily Frances Barron married Frederick Polhill-Turner in 1852.

== Works ==
- Notes on Education in Germany and Holland (1840)

Parliament of the United Kingdom
Preceded by Sir Simon Newport, 1st Bt	Member of Parliament for Waterford City; 2-seat constituency from 1832; 1832 – 1841; With: William Christmas 1832–1835; Thomas Wyse 1835–1841	Succeeded by William Christmas; William Morris Reade
Preceded by William Christmas; William Morris Reade	Member of Parliament for Waterford City; 1842 – 1847; With: Thomas Wyse	Succeeded by Thomas Meagher; Daniel O'Connell
Preceded by Thomas Meagher; Daniel O'Connell	Member of Parliament for Waterford City; 1848 – 1852; With: Thomas Meagher	Succeeded by Thomas Meagher; Robert Keating
Preceded by John Aloysius Blake; Michael Dobbyn Hassard	Member of Parliament for Waterford City; 1865 – 1868; With: John Aloysius Blake	Succeeded by John Aloysius Blake; James Delahunty
Preceded by John Aloysius Blake; James Delahunty	Member of Parliament for Waterford City; 1869–1870; With: James Delahunty	Succeeded by James Delahunty; Ralph Bernal Osborne
Baronetage of the United Kingdom
New creation	Baronet (of Bellevue); 1841–1872	Succeeded by Henry Page Barron
