= Osborne baronets of Ballintaylor and Ballylemon (1629) =

Osborne baronets
- Escutcheon of the Osborne baronets of Ballintaylor and Ballylemon
- Creation date: 1629
- Status: extant
- Motto: Pax in bello (Peace in war)
- Arms: Gules, on a fess or cotised argent two fountains proper, over all a bend of the last
- Crest: A sea lion sejant proper holding the dexter paw a trident sable, headed or

The Osborne baronetcy, of Ballintaylor and Ballylemon in County Waterford, was created in the Baronetage of Ireland on 15 October 1629 for Richard Osborne, a court clerk in the King's courts of the Kingdom of Ireland in County Waterford and County Tipperary. He represented County Waterford in the Irish House of Commons from 1639 to 1649, and from 1661 to 1666.

The 2nd Baronet represented Dungarvan from 1639 to 1649, the 7th Baronet represented Lismore 1719 to 1727 and County Waterford from 1727 to 1743, and the 8th Baronet represented Carysfort from 1761 to 1768, Dungarvan 1768 to 1783, and in 1783 Carysfort again. The 11th Baronet sat in Parliament for Carysfort 1798–9, and Enniskillen in 1800, and voted against the Act of Union in 1799 and in 1800. The former family seat was Newtown Anner House, County Tipperary.

== Osborne baronets, of Ballintaylor and Ballylemon (1629) ==
- Sir Richard Osborne, 1st Baronet (died 1667)
- Sir Richard Osborne, 2nd Baronet (died 1685)
- Sir John Osborne, 3rd Baronet (died April 1713)
- Sir Richard Osborne, 4th Baronet (died October 1713)
- Sir Thomas Osborne, 5th Baronet (died 1715)
- Sir Nicholas Osborne, 6th Baronet (died 1719)
- Sir John Osborne, 7th Baronet (died 1743)
- Sir William Osborne, 8th Baronet (died 1783)
- Sir Thomas Osborne, 9th Baronet (1757–1821)
- Sir William Osborne, 10th Baronet (1817–1824)
- Sir Henry Osborne, 11th Baronet (died 1837)
- Sir Daniel Toler Osborne, 12th Baronet (1783–1853)
- Sir William Osborne, 13th Baronet (1805–1875)
- Sir Charles Stanley Osborne, 14th Baronet (1825–1879)
- Sir Francis Osborne, 15th Baronet (1856–1948)
- Sir George Francis Osborne, 16th Baronet (1894–1960)
- Sir Peter George Osborne, 17th Baronet (born 1943)

The heir apparent is the present holder's eldest son George Osborne, the former chancellor of the exchequer.

Line of succession: Osborne of Ballintaylor and Ballylemon Baronets
- Sir Richard Osborne of Ballintaylor and Ballylemon, 1st Baronet (d. b. 1667)
  - Sir Richard Osborne, 2nd Baronet (died 1685)
    - Sir John Osborne, 3rd Baronet (died 1713)
    - Sir Richard Osborne, 4th Baronet (1713)
  - Nicholas Osborne (d. 1695/6)
    - Sir Thomas Osborne, 5th Baronet (died 1715)
      - Nicholas Osborne (died 1714)
        - Sir John Osborne, 7th Baronet (died 1743)
          - Rt. Hon. Sir William Osborne, 8th Baronet (died 1783)
            - Sir Thomas Osborne, 9th Baronet (1757—1821)
              - Sir William Osborne, 10th Baronet (1817—1824)
            - Sir Henry Osborne, 11th Baronet (a. 1758—1837)
              - Sir Daniel Toler Osborne, 12th Baronet (1783—1853)
                - Sir William Osborne, 13th Baronet (1805—1875)
                - Sir Charles Stanley Osborne, 14th Baronet (1825—1879)
              - Charles Osborne (1816—1871)
                - Sir Francis Osborne, 15th Baronet (1856—1948)
                  - Sir George Francis Osborne, 16th Baronet (1894—1960)
                    - Sir Peter George Osborne, 17th Baronet (born 1943)
                      - (1) Rt. Hon. George Gideon Oliver Osborne, CH (born 1971)
                        - (2) Luke Benedict Osborne (born 2001)
                      - (3) Benedict George Osborne (born 1973)
                      - (4) Adam Peter Osborne (born 1976)
                      - (5) Theo Grantley Osborne (born 1985)
                    - (6) James Francis Osborne (born 1946)
                      - (7) Harry Lucas Osborne (born 1988)
                - Edward Osborne (1861—1939)
                  - Stanley Patrick Osborne (1904—1989)
                    - (8) Anthony Trevor Osborne (born 1934)
                      - (9) Marcus Duncan Fitzwilliam Osborne (born 1967)
                    - Edward Peter Osborne (1938—2002)
                      - (10) John Philip Osborne (born 1963)
