= Richard Osborne (disambiguation) =

Richard Osborne is a former Australian rules footballer.

Richard Osborne may also refer to:

- Sir Richard Osborne, 1st Baronet (1593–1666/67), Irish baronet, lawyer and politician
- Sir Richard Osborne, 2nd Baronet (1618–1685), Irish baronet and politician
- Richard Osborne (American football) (1953–2025), American football player
- Richard Osborne (rugby union) (1848–1926), rugby union international who represented England in the first international in 1871
- Richard Osborne (politician), American politician

== See also ==
- Richard Osborn, academic administrator
