= Lord May =

Lord May may refer to:

- Baron May, a hereditary title created in 1935
  - George May, 1st Baron May (1871–1946), British financial expert and public servant
- Robert May, Baron May of Oxford (1936–2020), Australian scientist and President of the Royal Society

== See also ==
- Erskine May, 1st Baron Farnborough (1815–1886), British constitutional theorist and Clerk of the House of Commons
- Lady May (disambiguation)
