= May baronets =

Baronetcy in the Baronetage of the United Kingdom

There have been two baronetcies created for persons with the surname May, one in the Baronetage of Ireland and one in the Baronetage of the United Kingdom.

The May Baronetcy, of Mayfield in the County of Waterford, was created in the Baronetage of Ireland on 30 June 1763 for the Anglo-Irish politician James May. The second Baronet represented Belfast in the House of Commons between 1801 and 1814. The title became extinct on the death of the fourth Baronet in 1834.

The May Baronetcy, of the Eyot, was created in the Baronetage of the United Kingdom on 27 January 1931 for George May. For more information on this creation, see the Baron May.

== May baronets, of Mayfield (1763) ==
- Sir James May, 1st Baronet (c. 1724–1811)
- Sir Edward May, 2nd Baronet (1751–1814)
- Sir Humphrey May, 3rd Baronet (died 1819)
- Sir George Stephen May, 4th Baronet (c. 1763–1834)

== May baronets, of the Eyot (1931) ==
- see the Baron May
