= George Beresford, 1st Marquess of Waterford =

Anglo-Irish politician (1735–1800)

The Most Honourable The Marquess of Waterford KP PC (Ire)
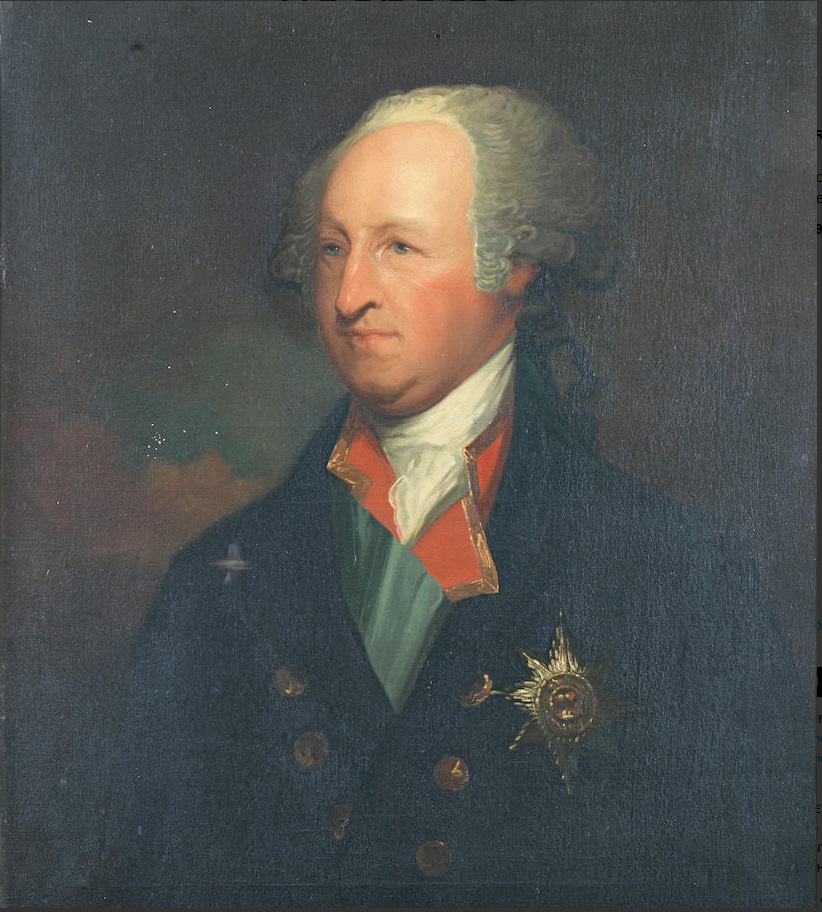
- Portrait of Lord Waterford, after Gilbert Stuart

Member of Parliament for Coleraine
- In office 1761–1763 Serving with Richard Jackson
- Preceded by: Richard Jackson; Hamilton Gorges
- Succeeded by: Richard Jackson; George Paul Monck

Member of Parliament for County Waterford
- In office 1757–1760 Serving with Aland Mason, James May
- Preceded by: Beverley Ussher; Aland Mason
- Succeeded by: James May; Hon. John Beresford

Personal details
- Born: George de la Poer Beresford; 8 January 1735
- Died: 3 December 1800 (aged 65)
- Spouse: Elizabeth Monck (m. 1769)
- Children: 10, including Henry Beresford, 2nd Marquess of Waterford
- Parent(s): Marcus Beresford, 1st Earl of Tyrone; Lady Catherine Power
- Education: Kilkenny College
- Alma mater: Trinity College Dublin

George de la Poer Beresford, 1st Marquess of Waterford, KP, PC (Ire) (8 January 1735 – 3 December 1800), styled Earl of Tyrone from 1763 to 1789, was an Anglo-Irish politician.

== Early life ==
Beresford was the eldest surviving son of Marcus Beresford, 1st Earl of Tyrone and his wife, Lady Catherine Power, suo jure Baroness de la Poer. Among his siblings were the Hon. John Beresford, MP (who married Countess Anne Constantin de Ligondes), and William Beresford, 1st Baron Decies (who married Elizabeth FitzGibbon, sister of John FitzGibbon, 1st Earl of Clare).

His mother was the only daughter and heiress of James Power, 3rd Earl of Tyrone (who was also the 8th Baron Power), of Curraghmore, County Waterford. His father was the only son of Sir Tristram Beresford, 3rd Baronet, and his wife Nichola Sophia Hamilton (youngest daughter of Hugh Hamilton, 1st Viscount of Glenawly).

He was educated at Kilkenny College and Trinity College Dublin.

== Career ==
Painting of Beresford circa 1780 by Johann Zoffany

From 1757 to 1760, he was a Member of the Irish House of Commons for County Waterford from 1757 to 1760, and for Coleraine from 1761 until 1763, when he inherited his father's earldom, entered the Irish House of Lords and was admitted to the Privy Council of Ireland.

He was Governor of Waterford from 1766 and custos rotulorum of that county from 1769 to 1800, during which time he was made a Knight of St Patrick, created Baron Tyrone in the Peerage of Great Britain in 1786, and elevated as a marquess in 1789.

== Personal life ==
On 19 April 1769, he married Elizabeth Monck, the daughter of Henry Monck, of Charleville, and the former Lady Isabella Bentinck (second daughter of Henry Bentinck, 1st Duke of Portland). Elizabeth was also the cousin of Charles Monck, 1st Viscount Monck. Together, they were the parents of eight children:

- Marcus Beresford, Lord Le Poer (1771–1783), who died young.
- Henry de la Poer, Beresford, 2nd Marquess of Waterford (1772–1826), politician who married Lady Susanna Carpenter, only daughter of George Carpenter, 2nd Earl of Tyrconnell, by his second wife Hon. Sarah Delaval (a younger daughter of John Delaval, 1st Baron Delaval), in 1805.
- Most Rev. Lord John George (1773–1862), Archbishop of Armagh.
- Lt.-Gen. Lord George Thomas Beresford (1781–1839), politician and soldier.
- Lady Isabella Anne Beresford (1776–1850), who married Sir John Brydges, MP, in 1812.
- Lady Catharine Beresford (1777–1843)
- Lady Anne Beresford (1779–1842)
- Lady Elizabeth Louisa Beresford (1783–1856), who married Maj.-Gen. Sir Denis Pack, in 1816, and Sir Thomas Reynell, 6th Baronet, in 1831.

He also had two illegitimate sons, William Carr Beresford, 1st Viscount Beresford, and Sir John Beresford, 1st Baronet.

Lord Waterford died in 1800 and his titles passed to his eldest surviving legitimate son, Henry.

Parliament of Ireland
Preceded by Beverley Ussher; Aland Mason	Member of Parliament for County Waterford; 1757–1760; With: Aland Mason 1757–1759; James May 1759–1760	Succeeded by James May; Hon. John Beresford
Preceded by Richard Jackson; Hamilton Gorges	Member of Parliament for Coleraine; 1761–1763; With: Richard Jackson	Succeeded by Richard Jackson; George Paul Monck
Peerage of Ireland
New creation	Marquess of Waterford; 1789–1800	Succeeded by Henry Beresford
Preceded by Marcus Beresford	Earl of Tyrone; 1763–1800	Succeeded by Henry Beresford
Preceded by Katherine Beresford	Baron La Poer; 1769–1800	Succeeded by Henry Beresford
Peerage of Great Britain
New creation	Baron Tyrone; 1786–1800	Succeeded by Henry Beresford
