= Richard Jackson (Coleraine MP) =

Irish politician

Richard Jackson (c. 1729 – 23 October 1789) was an Irish politician.

He sat in the House of Commons of Ireland from 1751 to 1789, as one of the two members for the borough of Coleraine. In 1777 he was appointed to the Privy Council of Ireland.

He was twice elected for another borough — Lisburn in 1776 and Randalstown in 1783 — but in each case was also re-elected for Coleraine, and chose to sit for Coleraine.

Parliament of Ireland
Preceded by Henry Carey; Thomas Jackson	Member of Parliament for Coleraine; 1751–1789; With: Henry Carey to 1757; Hamilton Gorges 1757–61; Lord La Poer 1761–63; George Paul Monck 1763–68; John Beresford 1768; Theophilus Jones 1768–76; Hon. Richard Annesley 1776–83; John Beresford 1783; Arthur Wolfe 1783	Succeeded by George Jackson; John Beresford
