= Beverley Ussher =

Beverley Ussher may refer to:

- Beverley Ussher (MP) (c. 1700–1757), Irish member of Parliament
- Beverley Ussher (architect) (1868–1908), Australian architect
