= Lady May =

Lady May may refer to:

== People ==
- Theresa May, Baroness May of Maidenhead (born 1956), Prime Minister of the United Kingdom from 2016 to 2019
- Lady May Abel Smith (1906–1994), member of the British royal family
- Lady May (Namibian singer) (born 1986), singer from Namibia
- Lady May (rapper) (born 1974), American rapper, singer, songwriter and model

== Other ==
- Lady May (cartoon character), a character in the television series Tiny Toon Adventures
- "Lady May" (song), a song by Tyler Childers
- "Lady May", a song by Glim Spanky

== See also ==
- The Lady of May, a 16th-century play by Philip Sidney
- Lord May (disambiguation)
