= High Sheriff of County Waterford =

The High Sheriff of County Waterford was the Sovereign's judicial representative in County Waterford. Initially, an office for a lifetime, assigned by the Sovereign, the High Sheriff became an annual appointment following the Provisions of Oxford in 1258. Besides his judicial importance, the sheriff had ceremonial and administrative functions and executed High Court Writs.

The first High Sheriff of County Waterford whose name is known for certain seems to be Maurice de Porta in 1235; Sir William de la Rochelle was High Sheriff in 1262–3, and William of London in 1270–3. Probably the most powerful of the early Sheriffs was Sir Walter de la Haye, a highly regarded Crown administrator and later a judge, who held office from 1272 to 1284. Unusually, instead of stepping down after a year, De la Haye's term in office continued year after year for more than a decade. He was then appointed Chief Escheator in 1285, and was briefly Justiciar of Ireland in 1294–6.

The first (High) Shrievalties were established before the Norman Conquest in 1066 and date back to Saxon times. In 1908, an Order in Council made the Lord-Lieutenant the Sovereign's prime representative in a county and reduced the High Sheriff's precedence. Despite that, however, the office retained his responsibilities for the preservation of law and order in a county.

== High Sheriffs of County Waterford ==
- 1235-1236: Maurice de Porta
- 1262-1263: Sir William de la Rochelle
- 1270-1271: William of London
- 1272-1284: Sir Walter de la Haye
- 1390: Peter Poer
- 1408: John Lyverpole
- 1414: Nicholas Walshe
- 1424: Nicholas Poer
- 1535: Sir Richard Poer
- 1607: Laurence Esmonde, 1st Baron Esmonde of Lymbricke
- 1613: Sir Richard Smyth of Ballynatray
- 1639: Edward Fitzgerald
- 1644: Andrew Lynn
- 1663: Valentine Greatrakes
- 1666: Richard Moore of Clonwel
- 1670: John Nettles of Toureen
- 1671: Sir Richard Osborne, 2nd Baronet
- 1672: Sir Thomas Osborne, 5th Baronet
- 1673:
- 1678: Thomas Christmas
- 1676: Richard Christmas
- 1687: Richard Fitzgerald
- 1689: John Hore
- 1690: Benjamin Bolton
- 1691:

== 18th century ==
- 1700: Charles Bolton
- 1703: Robert Carew
- 1704:
- 1710: Grice Smyth of Ballynatray
- 1711: Robert Carew
- 1714: James Roch
- 1715: Thomas Christmas
- 1717: Rodolphus Greene of Kilmanahan
- 1721: Benjamin Greene of Dungarvan
- 1722:
- 1725: James Ussher
- 1726:
- 1727: Beverley Ussher
- 1732: Richard Gumbleton of Castlerichard
- 1733:
- 1738: Cornelius Bolton
- 1740: David Lewis of Waterford
- 1742: Thomas Carew of Balinamona
- 1743: Cornelius Bolton
- 1744: Rodolphus Greene
- 1745:
- 1750: Sir William Osborne, 8th Baronet
- 1752: James May, later Sir James May, 1st Baronet of Mayfield
- 1755: John Congreve of Mount Congreve
- 1760: John Fitzgerald of Williamstown
- 1764: Richard Power of Clashmore
- 1772: Richard Gumbleton (son of Richard, HS 1732)
- 1772: William Daunt of Kilcascan
- 1776: Henry Coughlan of Ardo
- 1778: Cornelius Bolton
- 1779: Robert Thomas Carew of Ballinamona
- 1781: Edward May, later Sir (James) Edward May, 2nd Baronet
- 1782: Robert Uniacke of Woodhouse
- 1783: John Shee of Gardenmorris
- 1784: William Power of Gurteen
- 1785: John Jackson of Glanmore
- 1786: Sir Richard Musgrave, 1st Baronet, of Tourin
- 1789: Pierce Power
- 1790: Henry Bolton
- 1792: John Congreve of Landscape
- 1795: Sir Thomas Osborne, 9th Baronet
- 1798: Humphrey May, later Sir Humphrey May, 3rd Baronet

== 19th century ==
- 1800:
- 1802: John Palliser of Derryluskan
- 1803:
- 1804: Edward Lee of Tramore Park
- 1805: Charles W. Wall
- 1806: Ambrose Usher Congreve
- 1807: Percy Scott Smyth of Headborough
- 1808: Richard Keane
- 1809: Anthony Chearnley of Salterbridge
- 1810: Nuttal Greene
- 1811: Richard Power, jnr
- 1812: John Nugent Humble
- 1813: Arthur Fleming
- 1814: Walter Maguire
- 1815: Arthur Kelly
- 1816: Wray Palliser of Derryluskan
- 1817: John Henry Alcock
- 1818: Robert Uniacke
- 1819: John Keily of Strancally Castle
- 1820: Richard Musgrave, of Tourin
- 1821: Richard Smith
- 1822: W. Smith
- 1823: John Congreve
- 1824: William Christmas, of Whitfield
- 1825: James William Well, of Coolasmuck, Carrick-on-Suir
- 1826: Henry Amyas Bushe of Glencairn Abbey
- 1827: J. Power, of Mounrivers, Cappoqin.
- 1828: John O'Dell, of Mount O'Dell, Dungarven
- 1829:
- 1832: John Power O'Shee of Gardenmorris
- 1833:
- 1835: Pierce George Barron of Eastland, Tramore
- 1836: Robert Power of Clashmore House
- 1837: Gervase Bushe of Glencairne Abbey
- 1838: John Fitzgerald of Little Island, Waterford (born John Purcell)
- 1839:
- 1841: John William Power of Gurteen
- 1842: Richard Chearnley of Salterbridge
- 1843: Richard Wall of Rockenham
- 1844: John Palliser of Comragh
- 1845: John Bowen Gumbleton, of Fortwilliam
- 1846: Sir Robert Joshua Paul, 3rd Baronet of Paulville, Ballyglan
- 1848: S. Bagge of Ardmore House, Ardmore
- 1849: Robert Shapland Carew, 2nd Baron Carew of Ballinamona, Waterford.
- 1850: Henry Bolton, of Mecairn Castle, Lowtherstown.
- 1850: Richard Anthony Chearnley of Salterbridge.
- 1851: Richard Musgrave, later Sir Richard Musgrave, 4th Baronet of Tourin.
- 1852: Thomas St John Grant of Kilmurry.
- 1853: George Beresford Poer of Belleville Park.
- 1855: Patrick Joseph Mahon Power of Faithlegg House.
- 1855: William Charles Bonaparte-Wyse
- 1856: Sir John Henry Keane, 3rd Baronet of Cappoquin House, Cappoquin
- 1857:
- 1858: Sir Henry Barron, 1st Baronet of Barron's Court, Waterford
- 1859: George Whitelocke Lloyd of Strancally Castle.
- 1860: Thomas Fitzgerald.
- 1861: Henry Davis.
- 1861: Nicholas Richard Power O'Shea of Gardenmorris.
- 1862: Charles William More, 5th Earl Mountcashell.
- 1863: Benjamin Geale Humfrey.
- 1864: Robert Perceval Maxwell.
- 1865:
- 1866: Robert Thomas Carew of Ballinamona.
- 1867: James Galwey.
- 1868: Pierse-Marcus Barron of Glenview and Killoen.
- 1869:
- 1870: Dudley Francis Fortescue.
- 1871: Ambrose Congreve of Mount Congreve
- 1872: Percy Smyth of Headborough.
- 1873:
- 1878: William John Perceval-Maxwell of Moore Hill, Tallow.
- 1879: Edmond de la Poer, 1st Count de la Poer of Gurteen le Poer
- 1880: Sir Richard John Musgrave, 5th Baronet
- 1881:
- 1882: Henry Philip Chearnley of Salterbridge.
- 1883: Wray Bury Palliser of Annestown.
- 1884: Sir John Charles Kennedy, 3rd Baronet of Johnstown Kennedy
- 1885: Thomas William Anderson of Grace Dieu.
- 1886:
- 1887: Sir Thomas Henry Grattan Esmonde.
- 1888: Hubert Power.
- 1889: Henry Windsor Villiers-Stuart.
- 1890: Richard H Woodroofe of Ballysaggartmore.
- 1891: Robert Thomas Carew of Ballinamona Park.
- 1892: Sir William Goff Davis-Goff, 1st Baronet.
- 1893: Charles Perceval Bolton of Mount Bolton.
- 1894: Charles Nugent Humble of Cloncoskoraine.
- 1895:
- 1898: Henry Charles Windsor Villiers-Stuart of Dromana-within-the-Decies.
- 1899: Ambrose William Bushe Power of Barrettstown.

== 20th century ==
- 1900: Lucien William Bonaparte Wyse of the Manor of St Johns.
- 1901: Richard John Ussher of Cappagh House.
- 1902: John Henry Graham Holroyd Smyth
- 1903:
- 1905: William Joseph Gallwey of Rockfield, Tramore.
- 1906: John Congreve of Mount Congreve.
- 1907: Henry Chavasse.
- 1908: William Moore Perceval-Maxwell of Moore Hill, Tallow.
- 1909: Hon. Claud Anson.
- 1909: Robert Conway Dobbs Dobbs.
- 1910: James Grove White of Kilbyrne.
- 1911: Sir John Keane, 5th Baronet.
- 1913: John William Rivallon de la Poher Poer, 2nd (papal) Count de la Poer.
- 1914: Sir Herbert William Davis-Goff, 2nd Baronet.
- 1915:
- 1919: Sir Alexander Kay Muir, 2nd Baronet.
