= Sir Thomas Osborne, 5th Baronet =

Irish landowner

The arms of the Osborne of Ballentaylor baronets: Gules, on a fess or cotised argent two fountains proper, over all a bend of the last

Sir Thomas Osborne, 5th Baronet, of Tichenor, County Waterford (1639 – 10 October 1715) was an Irish baronet and landowner.

== Biography ==
He was the eldest son of Nicholas Osborne (1620 – 18 April 1696), Clerk of the Crown of Ireland, who was seated at Cappagh, County Tyrone.

After serving as High Sheriff of County Waterford for 1672–73, Thomas Osborne was knighted in 1679. The senior patrilineal grandson of Sir Richard Osborne, 1st Baronet and wife Mary Dalton, Sir Thomas was heir presumptive to the baronetcy from April until October 1713 when he succeeded his cousin, the 4th baronet, in the title.

== Family ==
Sir Thomas Osborne married firstly Katherine Butler, and had one son (and daughters including):

- Nicholas Osborne (1669 – 25 December 1714), married 3 July 1684 Anne Parsons, daughter of Sir Laurence Parsons, 1st Baronet, of Birr Castle and wife Frances Savage daughter of William Savage, of Castle Rheban, County Kildare, and had two sons and four daughters:
  - Sir Nicholas Osborne, 6th Baronet (1686 – 13 January 1718), succeeded in the baronetcy on 10 October 1715, married in 1709 Mary Smyth (died 9 February 1762; Lady Osborne married secondly Colonel John Ramsay), daughter of the Rt Revd Thomas Smyth, Bishop of Limerick, and had two daughters:
    - Anne Osborne, married on 15 October 1733 Henry Vereker, of Roxborough, son of Connel Vereker, High Sheriff of Limerick, and wife Mary Godsell, having issue (see Viscount Gort)
    - Dorothy Osborne, married William Taylor, of Mallow and Sheriff of Cork City
  - Sir John Osborne MP, 7th Baronet
  - Frances Osborne married John Jephson, of Carrick, County Tipperary
  - Mary Osborne, married on 22 December 1716 William Moore, Deputy Muster-Master General (died 18 March 1735)
  - Arabella Osborne, married in 1753 Robert Marshall, Justice of the Irish Court of Common Pleas (died 1774)
- Alice Osborne, married firstly Thomas Warter, of Cullen, County Tipperary, without issue, and married secondly Robert Blennerhassett MP (1652–1712), and had issue (see Blennerhassett family).

Sir Thomas Osborne married secondly on 9 October 1703 his first cousin Anne Ussher, sister of John Ussher MP, and youngest daughter of Colonel Beverley Ussher, of Ballyfin, County Cork and of Kilmeadan, County Waterford.

== Sources ==
- Charles Mosley, editor, Burke's Peerage, Baronetage & Knightage, 107th edition, 3 volumes (Wilmington, Delaware, U.S.A.: Burke's Peerage (Genealogical Books) Ltd, 2003), volume 2, page 3031.
- Hugh Montgomery-Massingberd, editor, Burke's Irish Family Records (London, U.K.: Burkes Peerage Ltd, 1976), pages 27, 136 and 1156.

Baronetage of Ireland
Preceded by Sir Richard Osborne	Baronet (of Ballentaylor and Ballylemon); 1713–1715	Succeeded by Sir Nicholas Osborne
