= Sir John Osborne, 7th Baronet =

Irish politician and landowner

Sir John Osborne, 7th Baronet (died 11 April 1743), was an Irish baronet, landowner and politician.

== Biography ==
He was the younger son of Nicholas Osborne (died 25 December 1714) and wife Anne née Parsons, and grandson of Sir Thomas Osborne, 5th Baronet and Sir Laurence Parsons, 1st Baronet. He succeeded his brother, Sir Nicholas Osborne, 6th Baronet, in 1719.

Educated at the Middle Temple, he practised as a barrister after being called to the Bar at King's Inns, Dublin in 1726.

Sir John served as member of Parliament in the Irish House of Commons for Lismore from 1719 until 1727 and for County Waterford between 1727 and 1743.

=== Marriage ===
Osborne married Editha Proby (died 19 January 1745), daughter of William Proby of Fort St George in India.

Sir John and Lady Osborne had five surviving daughters and one surviving son, Rt. Hon. Sir William Osborne, 8th Baronet, who succeeded his father in the baronetcy in 1743.

== Sources ==
- L. G. Pine, The New Extinct Peerage 1884–1971: Containing Extinct, Abeyant, Dormant and Suspended Peerages With Genealogies and Arms (London, U.K.: Heraldry Today, 1972), page 60.
- Charles Mosley, editor, Burke's Peerage, Baronetage & Knightage, 107th edition, 3 volumes (Wilmington, Delaware, U.S.A.: Burke's Peerage (Genealogical Books) Ltd, 2003), volume 2, page 3031.

Parliament of Ireland
Preceded by Thomas Meredyth; Sir Arthur Shaen, Bt	Member of Parliament for Lismore; 1719–1727; With: Sir Arthur Shaen, Bt; Hugh Dixon	Succeeded by Noblett Dunscomb; Richard Aldworth
Preceded by James May; Edward May	Member of Parliament for County Waterford; 1727–1743; With: Edward May 1727–1729; Lord Villiers 1730–1732; James May 1733–1734; Ambrose Congreve 1735; Beverley Ussher 1735–1743	Succeeded by Thomas Christmas; Beverley Ussher
Baronetage of Ireland
Preceded by Sir Nicholas Osborne	Baronet (of Ballentaylor and Ballylemon); 1719–1743	Succeeded by Sir William Osborne
