= Matthew Williamson =

English fashion and interior designer

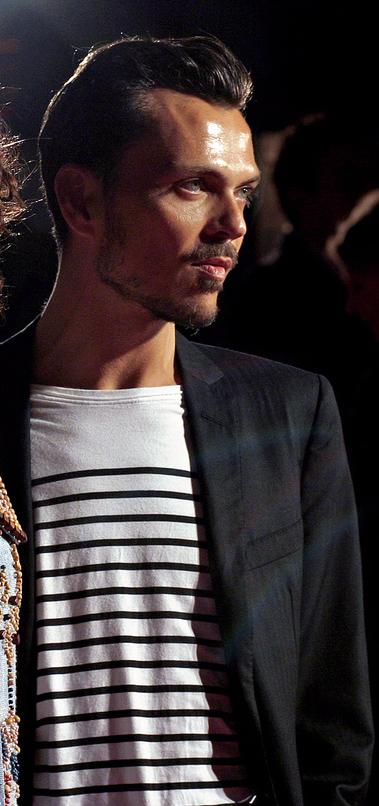
- Williamson in 2007
- Born: 23 October 1971 (age 54); Manchester, England
- Education: Central Saint Martin's College of Art and Design
- Labels: Matthew Williamson; Pucci

Matthew Williamson (born 23 October 1971) is an interior designer known for his use of bold, colourful and carefully constructed designs.

== Early years and education ==
Williamson was born in Manchester and studied in Loreto College until he was 17 years old. He then moved to London to attend school at Central Saint Martin's College of Art and Design, graduating in 1994.

== Career ==
=== Fashion ===
Together with Joseph Velosa, Williamson founded his eponymous fashion house in February 1997. The same year, he debuted his collection 'Electric Angels' at London Fashion Week. His collections were displayed during New York Fashion week in 2002. His store at 28 Bruton Street, in Mayfair, London, followed in 2004.

In 2005, Williamson launched his perfume range.

In addition to designing his eponymous line, Williamson served as creative director at Pucci from 2006 to 2008; he succeeded Christian Lacroix.

In 2007, a runway show of his designs was incorporated into the video for Prince's song "Chelsea Rodgers" from his Planet Earth album.

In September 2008, Williamson returned to London full-time to focus fully on his own label's forthcoming ventures and expansion.

In 2010, Williamson's brand debuted at retail his first men's capsule collection.

In Autumn 2010, a self-titled book was published by Rizzoli. The book is written by Colin McDowell with a foreword by Sienna Miller, and contributions from Anna Wintour, Alexandra Shulman and Diane von Fürstenberg. An accompanying photographic exhibition marked the book launch at Somerset House.

In 2011, Williamson launched MW by Matthew Williamson, a diffusion line as part of a license agreement with Italian company Mariella Burani Fashion Group.

September 2012 marked the 15th anniversary of Williamson's career. To commemorate the occasion, a short film was commissioned in association with Swarovski. The film, titled XV, stars friends of the brand including Sienna Miller, Andrea Riseborough and Poppy Delevingne. It was showcased exclusively on Net-a-Porter.com alongside a limited edition Swarovski collection of crystal dresses.

By 2015, Williamson moved to selling his brand's collections online with a renewed focus on licenses and closed his London flagship.

=== Home and lifestyle ===
Williamson then expanded into the home and lifestyle sectors. 2013 saw the launch of his collaboration with Osborne & Little on a range of home furnishing fabrics and wallpapers. The second collection was released in 2014, titled 'Samana', and the third in 2015, titled 'Cubana'. In 2016, Williamson collaborated with Duresta to launch his first furniture collection, as well as cards, stationery and a designer colouring book featuring notable prints from the designer's previous fashion collections. In October 2016, Williamson launched a collaboration with United States homeware brand CB2, a division of Crate & Barrel.

Williamson also has had collaborations with Linda Farrow for sunglasses and The Rug Company.

In 2022, Williamson launched a homeware collection for John Lewis. The range is characterised by his signature bold colours and maximalist botanical wallpapers, bedding, cushions, and towels alongside mirrors, lighting, and candles. Matthew's collaboration is the biggest of its kind for the department store chain and will be ongoing, with a new collection to launch in 2023.

In 2022, Williamson designed The Cocktail Club's Birmingham location. The cocktail bar's decadent interior highlights Matthew's distinct use of pattern and colour through the inclusion of leopard print sofas, gold leaf ceiling hangings, and a 1970s London Zoo cheetah centrepiece.

In 2023, Williamson designed the Design Kitchen, a dining space located at the Design Museum in Kensington, London. For this project, he worked closely with UK-based artisans to create a green lounge filled with soft leather furnishings which contrast the building's otherwise minimalist, industrial aesthetic.

Also in 2023, Williamson collaborated with luxury British footwear and accessories brand, Kurt Geiger, to launch a limited-edition summer collection. This curation of beachwear and furnishings included handbags, deck chairs, shoes, swimwear, and jewellery in a range of bespoke prints created by Williamson.

== Other activities ==
In 2010, Williamson made a guest appearance on season 7 of Project Runway. The episode aired on 28 January 2010.

In 2019, Williamson was the guest judge on episode 1 of the first series of Interior Design Masters, which aired on 14 August 2019 on BBC Two. He returned in the eighth week to help judge the final, alongside fellow guest judge Naomi Cleaver. Matthew is a continuing guest judge on the competition series, offering advice and appraisal to designers looking for their big break. Matthew will be returning to judge season 4 which airs in spring 2023.

In 2023, Williamson released a book entitled, Living Bright: Fashioning Colourful Interiors, published by Thames & Hudson, who describe it as: "A practical guide for how to turn bland corners of your home into a technicolour paradise."

Williamson designed the Brit statuette for the 2026 Brit Awards, the first to be held outside of London, with the design inspired by the honey produced by worker bees, the symbol of the ceremony's host city Manchester.

== Recognition ==
=== Exhibitions ===
In 2007, the Design Museum in London hosted a retrospective of Williamson's work entitled "Matthew Williamson – 10 years in Fashion".

=== Awards ===
In 2008, Williamson was awarded the "Red Carpet Designer" accolade at the British Fashion Awards, where he has also received three nominations for Designer of the Year.
