= Mark Alliegro =

American politician

Member of the New Hampshire House of Representatives from the Grafton 7th district
- In office December 2, 2020 – December 7, 2022
- Preceded by: Richard Osborne

Personal details
- Party: Republican

Mark Alliegro is an American politician. He served as a Republican member for the Grafton 7th district of the New Hampshire House of Representatives.

== Life and career ==
Alliegro is a former senior scientist of the Marine Biological Laboratory.

In 2020, Alliegro defeated Richard Osborne in the general election for the Grafton 7th district of the New Hampshire House of Representatives, winning 51 percent of the votes.
