= Sir John Charles Kennedy, 3rd Baronet =

Irish soldier

Sir John Kennedy, Bt DL JP

High Sheriff of County Waterford
- In office 1884–1885
- Preceded by: Wray Bury Palliser
- Succeeded by: Thomas William Anderson

Personal details
- Born: 23 March 1856
- Died: 21 March 1923 (aged 66); Dublin, Ireland
- Spouse: Sydney Harriet Maude Higginson (m. 1879; died 1923)
- Children: 4
- Parent(s): Sir Charles Kennedy, 2nd Baronet; Augusta Maria Pery
- Education: Eton College
- Alma mater: Trinity College, Cambridge

Sir John Charles Kennedy, 3rd Baronet DL JP (23 March 1856 – 21 March 1923) was an Irish soldier.

== Early life ==
Kennedy was born on 23 March 1856. He was the son of Sir Charles Kennedy, 2nd Baronet and the former Augusta Maria Pery. His younger brother was George Edward de Vere Kennedy, a Lt. in the 5th Lancers who married a daughter of Sir John Carden, 4th Baronet.

His paternal grandparents were Sir John Kennedy, 1st Baronet and the former Maria Beauman. His maternal grandparents were Henry Pery, Lord Glentworth (eldest son and heir apparent of Edmund Pery, 1st Earl of Limerick) and Annabella Edwards.

He was educated at Eton College before attending Trinity College, Cambridge, from where he graduated in 1879.

== Career ==
Kennedy served as a Lieutenant in the 3rd Battalion, Royal Dublin Fusiliers. Upon the death of his father on 4 December 1880, he succeeded as the 3rd Baronet Kennedy, of Johnstown Kennedy, County Dublin. The family seat was Johnstown Kennedy, Rathcoole, County Dublin.

He served as High Sheriff of County Waterford in 1884. He held the office of Deputy Lieutenant of County Dublin and was a Justice of the Peace for County Dublin.

== Personal life ==
On 11 November 1879, Kennedy married Sydney Harriet Maude Higginson (d. 1939), a daughter of Sir James Macaulay Higginson, Governor of Mauritius. Together, they were the parents of:

- Augusta Mabel Kennedy (d. 1954), who married Lloyd Edward Hughes, son of Capt. George William Bulkeley Hughes, in 1913.
- Gladys Maude Kennedy (d. 1915)
- Sir John Ralph Bayly Kennedy, 4th Baronet (1896–1968), a Lt. in the Royal Artillery who fought in both World Wars; he died unmarried.
- Sir James Edward Kennedy, 5th Baronet (1898–1974), who also died unmarried.

Sir John died at Johnstown Kennedy on 21 March 1923, and Lady Kennedy died on 10 August 1939. He was, in turn, succeeded in the baronetcy by both of his sons. As neither of them married, after the death of his youngest son in 1974, the baronetcy passed to Derrick Edward de Vere Kennedy, the 3rd Baronet's nephew.

Honorary titles
Preceded by Wray Bury Palliser	High Sheriff of County Waterford; 1884–1885	Succeeded by Thomas William Anderson
Baronetage of the United Kingdom
Preceded by Charles Edward Bayly Kennedy	Baronet (of Johnstown Kennedy); 1880–1923	Succeeded by John Ralph Bayly Kennedy
