= Sir Edward May, 2nd Baronet =

Irish politician (died 1814)

Member of Parliament for Belfast

2nd Baronet, of Mayfield (cr. 1763)
- In office 1 January 1801 – 23 July 1814
- Monarch: George III
- Preceded by: Constituency established
- Succeeded by: Stephen May

Member of Parliament for Belfast
- In office 3 February 1800 – 31 December 1800
- Preceded by: Alexander Hamilton (Irish lawyer)
- Succeeded by: Constituency abolished

Sovereign of Belfast
- In office 1803–1806

Sovereign of Belfast
- In office 1809–1810

High Sheriff of County Waterford
- In office 1781–1782

Personal details
- Born: c. 1751 Mayfield, County Waterford, Ireland
- Died: 23 July 1814 (aged 63)
- Spouses: Elizabeth Bragg (m. 1773); Elizabeth Lumley (m. c. 1809)
- Children: Sir Stephen May; Rev. Edward Sylvester May; Anna, Marchioness of Donegall; Elizabeth May
- Parents: Sir James May, 1st Baronet (father); Anne Moore (mother)
- Education: Trinity College Dublin
- Occupation: Politician, barrister

Sir (James) Edward May, 2nd Baronet (1751? – 23 July 1814) of Mayfield, County Waterford, was an Irish politician who was twice Sovereign of Belfast, a Member of Parliament in successive Irish and United Kingdom parliaments, and High Sheriff of County Waterford.

He was born the eldest son of Sir James May, 1st Baronet of Mayfield, and privately educated before entering Trinity College, Dublin (TCD), and studying law at the Middle Temple in London, where he was called to the bar in 1789. He succeeded his father to the baronetcy in 1811.

He was appointed High Sheriff of Waterford for 1781–82.

He was an MP in the Parliament of Ireland in 1800, the last parliament before the Union of Great Britain and Ireland. He continued afterwards as the member for Belfast in the Parliament of the United Kingdom from 1801 to 1814. He also served as Sovereign of Belfast (an earlier title for the mayor) from 1803 to 1806 and 1809 to 1810.

He married twice and had 2 illegitimate sons and 2 daughters. He was accordingly succeeded in the baronetcy by his younger brother Humphrey. An illegitimate daughter, Anna, married The 2nd Marquess of Donegall.

Parliament of the United Kingdom
Preceded by Parliament of Great Britain	Member of Parliament for Belfast; 1801–1814	Succeeded by Stephen Edward May
Baronetage of Ireland
Preceded by James May	Baronet (of Mayfield); 1811–1814	Succeeded by Humphrey May
