= Neisha Crosland =

British textile designer

- Born: 11 December 1960 (age 65)
- Occupations: textile designer, fashion and accessories designer,
- Notable credit(s): Royal Designer for Industry, RSA, 2006

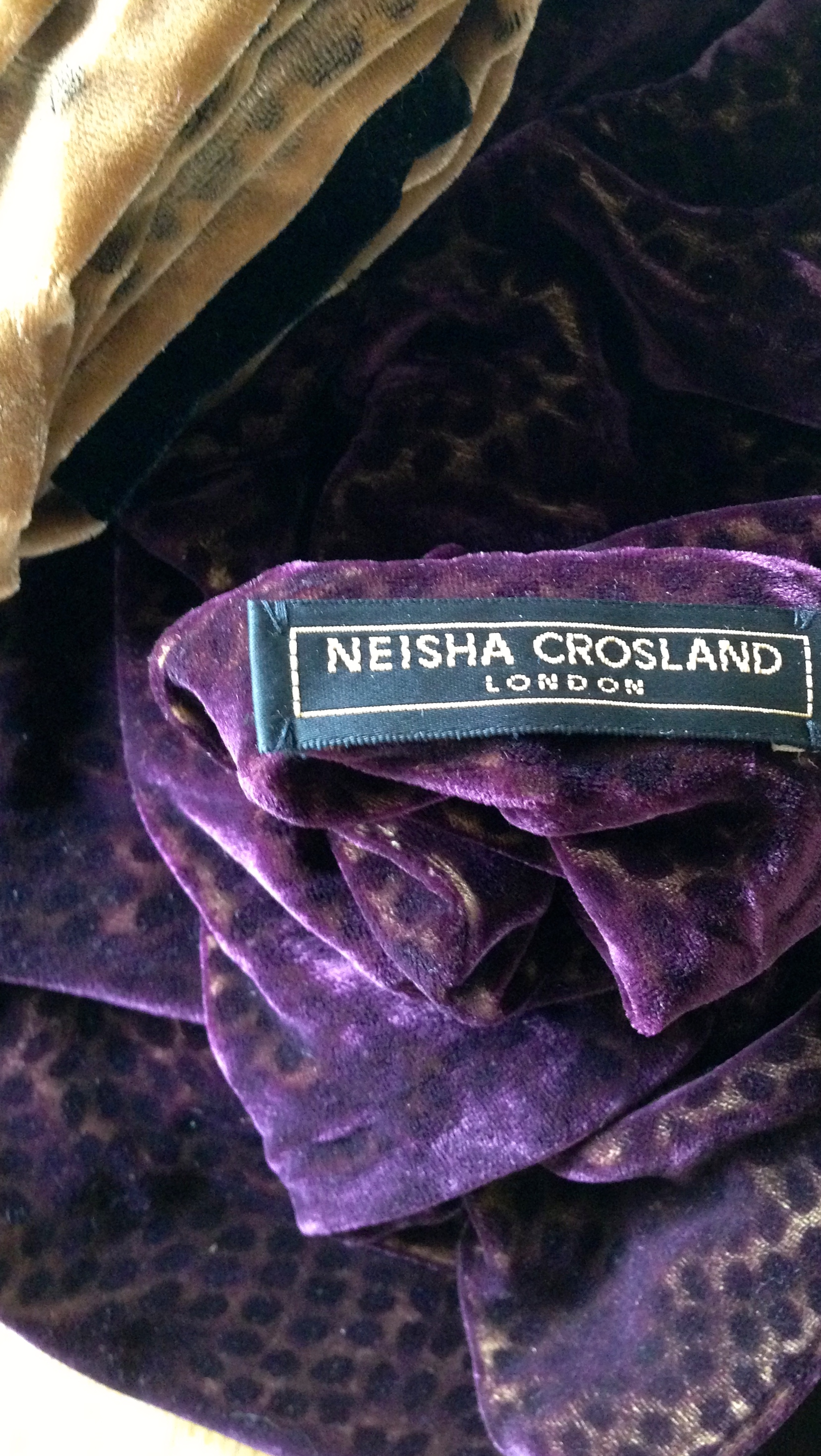
Neisha Crosland printed silk velvet scarves from around 1997

Neisha Crosland RDI is a British-born, London-based textile designer, who works in the fields of furnishing fabric, wallpaper and interiors products. Her designs have featured in the ranges of British brands such as Osborne & Little and John Lewis. Internationally, her work is also recognised and she has a collection for Hankyu department stores in Japan.

In the 1990s, she was also involved in fashion accessories, designing a range of printed velvet scarves. Examples of her work in both fashion and interiors are part of the permanent collection of the Victoria and Albert Museum (V&A) and her interior designs are part of the archive of the Geffrye Museum. She is a Royal Designer for Industry.

== Background ==
Crosland studied textile design at Camberwell College of Arts, followed by a MA at Royal College of Art. Her work was spotted at her graduation show in 1986 and she was commissioned by designer brand Osborne & Little to design a wallpaper collection – known as the Star collection, it became a best-seller. She also designed for more mainstream wallpaper companies, including Harlequin Wallcoverings, and her designs retailed in Texas Homecare DIY outlets in the early 1990s; some of the originals of these designs are now held in the V&A's archives.

=== Freelance design ===
Crosland worked as a freelance designer from 1994, selling designs painted on paper to fashion and fabric houses. In 1996 she launched her range of scarves, which retailed at stores such as Harrods; subsequently she was asked to produce a diffusion line for Debenhams. Her first eponymous collection of wallpapers was launched in 1999 and was distributed by the Paint & Paper Library in Chelsea.

=== Recent work ===
In recent years, Crosland has expanded into other design areas, including flooring tiles and rugs. She has designed her own range of clothing and accessories called Ginka and her online retail store still sells a collection of scarves under her eponymous brand. She now produces under licence – including for Japanese retailer Hankyu and The Rug Company – putting over 50 designs a year onto products. Her wallpaper designs have been used in London locations such as Annabel's nightclub and Claridge's and The Dorchester hotels.

== Academic roles and awards ==
During her early career Crosland held external teaching appointments at several art colleges, including Glasgow School of Art. More recently, she has been an external examiner at the Royal College of Art. Crosland was elected a Royal Designer for Industry by the RSA in 2006 for her work in textile design. She was named as one of Time's style and design 100 for her textile work in 2007. In 2013, Homes & Gardens magazine in the UK named her Surface Designer of the year.
