= Osborne & Little =

British fabric manufacturer and retailer

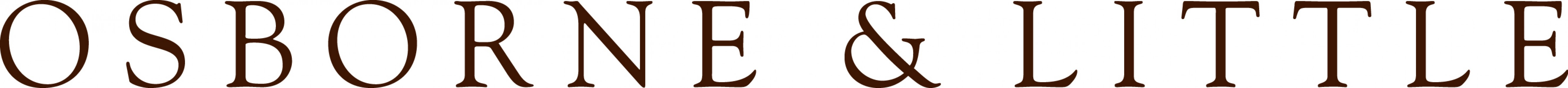
- Traded as: Osborne & Little
- Industry: wallpaper fabric, interiors products
- Founded: London, England (1968)
- Founder: Sir Peter Osborne; Antony Little
- Headquarters: London, England
- Website: osborneandlittle.com

Osborne & Little Limited is a British manufacturer and retailer of upmarket wallpaper and fabrics. It was established in 1968 and now has showrooms worldwide. It was among the brands included in the Victoria and Albert Museum's British Design 1948–2012: Innovation in the Modern Age exhibition in 2012.

== History ==
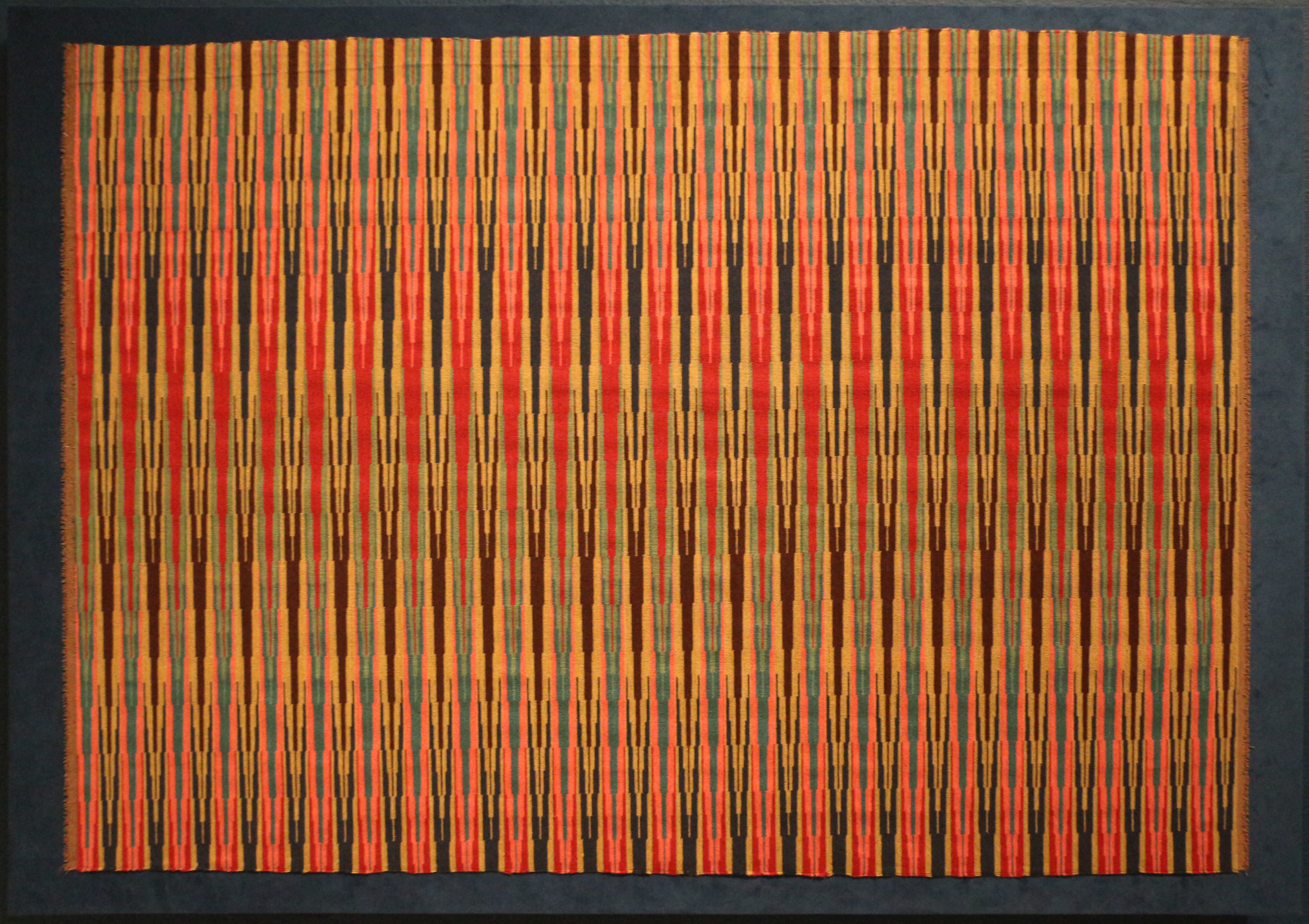
A 1988 Osborne & Little textile housed at the Art Institute of Chicago

Osborne & Little was established by Sir Peter Osborne (father of Conservative Party politician George Osborne) and his brother-in-law Antony Little. The company's shop, in the King's Road, Chelsea, put it in the heart of Swinging London.

Little was the designer – he had been responsible for Biba's distinctive black and gold logo – and created most of the company's early ranges. Hand-printed papers were inspired by everything from the designs of Aubrey Beardsley to the Brighton Pavilion Its success in reinterpreting classic designs in new ways during the 1970s and '80s meant that Little soon presided over a large design team. In the book Twentieth Century Pattern Design, Lesley Jackson described the brand as distinctive for its bold reinterpretations of traditional patterns, adding: "historical references tend to be lateral rather than literal".

== Expansion ==
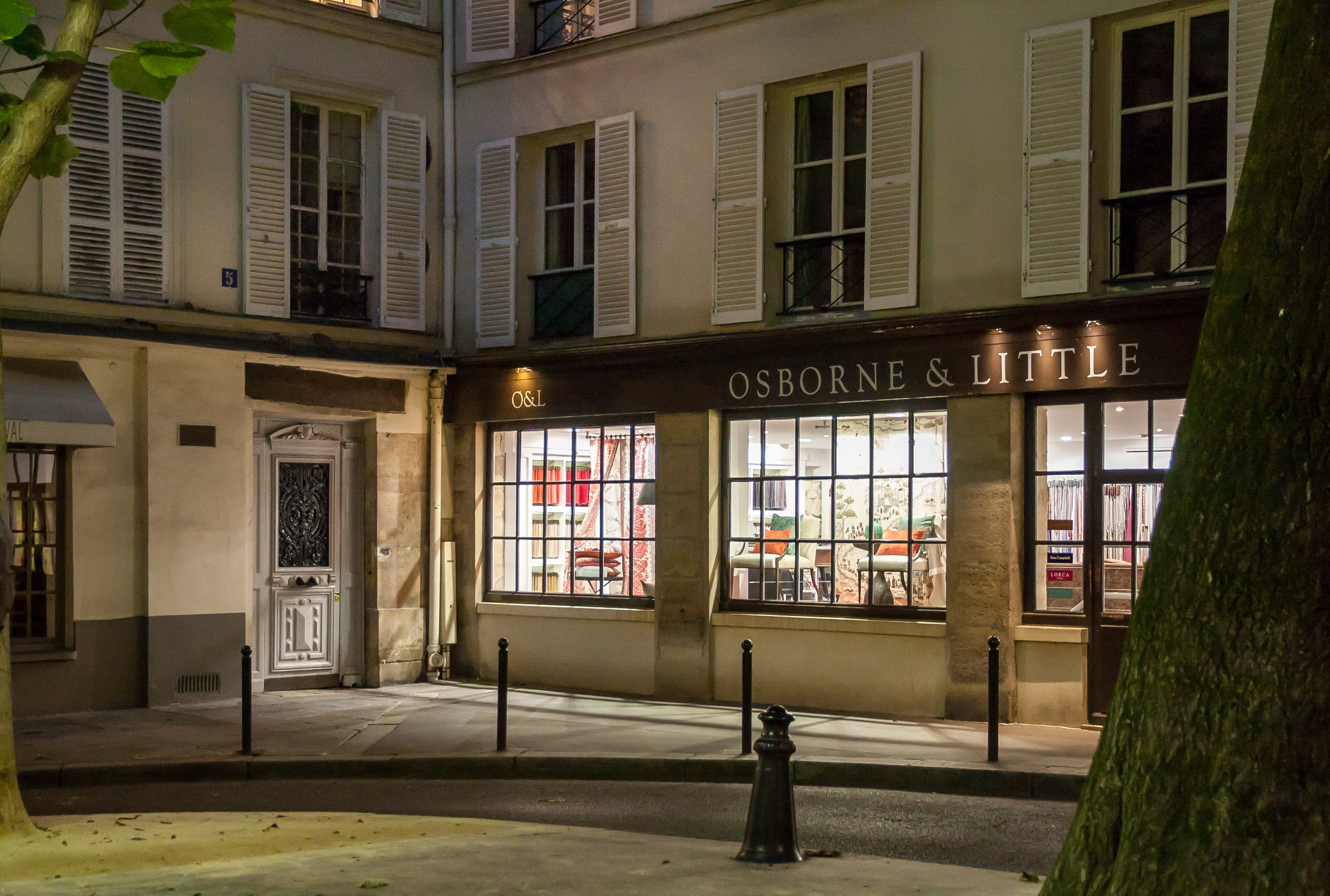
Branch in Paris, 2014

The company took over Isabel Tisdall's Tamesa Fabrics in 1985 and later acquired the distribution rights to Lorca fabrics and Liberty Furnishings. It has a longstanding association with interior designer Nina Campbell, distributing her collections. The company has a wholly owned US subsidiary and showrooms across Europe, in addition to retailing via UK stores such as John Lewis. Its high-profile clients have included Bill and Hillary Clinton, who used Osborne & Little designs in their private apartment at the White House.

The company was formerly listed on the London Stock Exchange, delisting in 2003; it had a turnover of almost £33M in 2011, with a quarter of this coming from sales in mainland Europe. Little retired from the business in 2005 and Osborne remains CEO. Former Chancellor of the Exchequer George Osborne retains a shareholding in the company.

== Tax 'deferral' ==
The company recorded a pre-tax profit of £722,000 on turnover of £34 million in 2014/5. In 2015 it was revealed by Private Eye that, despite this profit, the company paid no corporation tax for the year 2015 – thereby avoiding a "tax bill" of £179,000. The magazine also revealed that the company had not paid any corporation tax since 2008 and had even received a tax credit of £12,000 in the year 2010. This was due to the company making losses totalling £9 million between 2009 and 2014, which allow the carry forward of credits for losses against the 2015 corporation tax bill. Despite these losses, the companies' directors were paid a total of £1.2million in the year 2012 alone. The former Chancellor of the Exchequer, George Osborne, owns a 15% stake in the company, which is estimated to be worth between 15 and 30 million pounds.

== Design collaborations ==
Osborne & Little has collaborated with a number of other British fashion and textile designers over the years, including Zandra Rhodes, Neisha Crosland and Matthew Williamson.
