= Sir James May, 1st Baronet =

Anglo-Irish politician (1723–1811)

Sir James May, 1st Baronet (6 November 1723 – 8 November 1811) was an Anglo-Irish politician.

May was the son of James May and Letitia Ponsonby, daughter of William Ponsonby, 1st Viscount Duncannon. He was the Member of Parliament for County Waterford between 1759 and 1797. On 30 June 1763 he was created a baronet, of Mayfield in the Baronetage of Ireland; he was succeeded in his title by his son, Edward May.

Parliament of Ireland
Preceded by Lord La Poer; Aland Mason	County Waterford; 1759–1797; With: Lord La Poer (1759–1761); Hon. John Beresford (1761–1797)	Succeeded by Hon. John Beresford; Richard Power
Baronetage of Ireland
New creation	Baronet (of Mayfield); 1763–1811	Succeeded by Edward May
