= Sir George Francis Osborne, 16th Baronet =

Irish Baronet

Lieutenant-Colonel Sir George Francis Osborne Bt MC
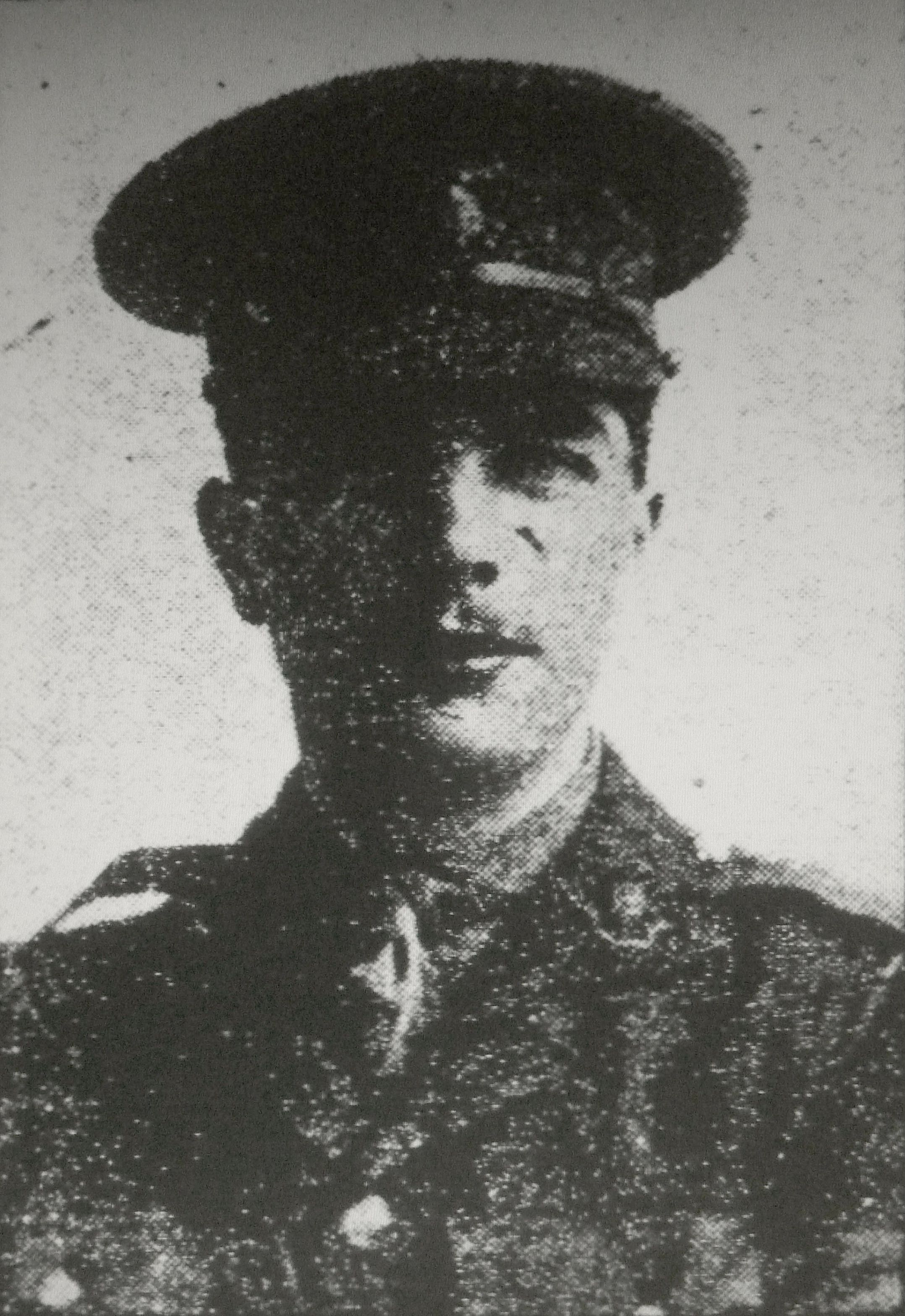
- Captain G.F. Osborne, in 1915
- Born: 27 July 1894
- Died: 21 July 1960 (aged 65)
- Education: Repton School
- Alma mater: Royal Military Academy Sandhurst
- Occupation: Military officer
- Spouse: Mary Grace Horn (m. 1938)
- Children: 4
- Parent(s): Sir Francis Osborne, 15th Baronet; Kathleen Eliza Whitfield

Sir George Francis Osborne, 16th Baronet, MC (27 July 1894 – 21 July 1960) was an Anglo-Irish baronet and British Army officer. He was decorated for gallantry during the First World War.

== Biography ==
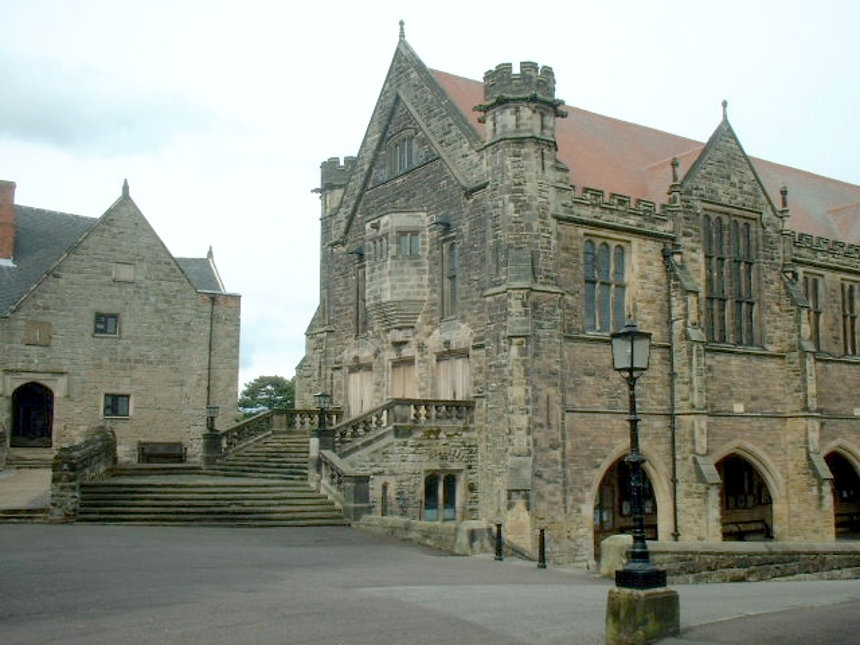
Repton School, Derbyshire

Osborne was born on 27 July 1894. He was the eldest son of Sir Francis Osborne, 15th Baronet and wife Kathleen Eliza née Whitfield, of Framfield Grange, Sussex.

Osborne was educated at Repton School, Derbyshire before entering the Royal Military Academy Sandhurst, Berkshire.

== Career ==
Osborne fought with distinction in the First World War, receiving mentions in despatches.

Wounded in combat twice, Osborne was awarded the Military Cross in 1917 and was promoted major in 1932 before retiring from regular service with the Royal Sussex Regiment in the rank of lieutenant-colonel.

Osborne of Ballintaylor arms

Osborne succeeded to the family title, the Osborne Baronetcy of Ballentaylor and Ballylemonon, on 23 October 1948.

== Personal life and death ==
On 27 February 1938 Osborne married Mary Grace Horn (1903–1987), daughter of Clement Samuel Horn (1871–1946) and Juliet Ivy Sceales (1881–1969), of Goring-by-Sea, Sussex. His wife had previously been married to Robert Stavali Aspinall, a British Army surgeon, by whom she had had a son, the zoo and casino owner John Victor Aspinall.

Osborne and his wife had four children:

- Jennifer Jane Osborne (1939–2022)
- Caroline Mary Osborne (b. 1941)
- Sir Peter Osborne, 17th Baronet, of Highclere, Hampshire (b. 1943), father of George Osborne, former Chancellor of the Exchequer
- James Francis Osborne (b. 1946)

He died on 21 July 1960.

Coat of arms of Osborne of Ballentaylor and Ballylemon

Crest
A sea lion sejant proper holding the dexter paw a trident sable, headed or
Escutcheon
Gules, on a fess or cotised argent two fountains proper, over all a bend of the last
Motto
Pax in bello ("Peace in war")
Other elements
Red Hand of Ulster

== Sources ==
- Charles Mosley, editor, Burke's Peerage, Baronetage & Knightage, 107th edition, 3 volumes (Wilmington, Delaware, U.S.A.: Burke's Peerage (Genealogical Books) Ltd, 2003), volume 2, pages 3031 and 3032.

Baronetage of Ireland
Preceded by Sir Francis Osborne	Baronet (of Ballentaylor and Ballylemon); 1948–1960	Succeeded by Sir Peter Osborne
