= Robert Blennerhassett (1652–1712) =

Irish lawyer and politician

Robert Blennerhassett (1652 – October 1712) was an Irish lawyer and politician.

Blennerhasset was the second son of Arthur Blennerhassett of Ballycarty Castle, County Kerry, and his wife Mary FitzGerald, daughter of the Reverend Gerald FitzGerald, Archdeacon of Emly, and Annabella Rice. He matriculated from Trinity College Dublin in 1667, and was called to the Bar. Although he had a house in Dublin, he lived mainly in Clonmel, and was a burgess of the town.

He sat in the Irish House of Commons for Clonmel in 1692 and 1695, and Limerick from 1703. He was Seneschal of County Tipperary in 1705. He served briefly as Prime Serjeant 1711–12, having previously served as Recorder of Clonmel. He died aged 60, while still serving as Serjeant.

He married Alice Osborne, daughter of Sir Thomas Osborne, 5th Baronet and Katherine Butler, and widow of Thomas Warter, and by her was the father of Arthur Blennerhassett, justice of the Court of King's Bench (Ireland), as well as four daughters.
