= Sir Peter Osborne, 17th Baronet =

British businessman (born 1943)

Sir Peter Osborne Bt
- Born: 29 June 1943 (age 83)
- Education: Wellington College
- Alma mater: Christ Church, Oxford
- Occupation: Businessman
- Spouse: Felicity Loxton-Peacock (m. 1968)
- Children: 4, including George
- Parent(s): Sir George Osborne, 16th Baronet; Mary Horn

Sir Peter George Osborne, 17th Baronet (born 29 June 1943) is a British businessman, who co-founded the interior design firm Osborne & Little in 1968. He is the father of George Osborne, the Conservative politician and former Chancellor of the Exchequer.

== Early life ==
Osborne of Ballintaylor arms

Peter Osborne was born on 29 June 1943. He is the elder son of Sir George Osborne, 16th Baronet, who as an officer in the Royal Sussex Regiment, was decorated during the First World War, and Mary Horn. Osborne was educated at Wellington College, Berkshire, and received an MA from Christ Church, Oxford. He succeeded to the baronetcy, becoming the 17th Osborne baronet of Ballentaylor and Ballylemon, on 21 July 1960, upon the death of his father.

== Career ==
In 1968, Osborne and his brother-in-law Anthony Little co-founded Osborne & Little, a successful manufacturer and retailer of upmarket wallpaper and fabrics, opening its initial showroom in Chelsea. It was revealed in 2016 that the firm had made £6 million in a 2004 property deal with a developer from the British Virgin Islands, a tax haven, and had not paid any corporation tax for seven years. Osborne's personal wealth, amassed through inheritance and his business career, has been the subject of controversy during his son's political career, especially after an interview with the Financial Times in which he discussed his "expensive tastes", such as the purchase of a £19,000 Italian desk.

== Family ==
On 16 October 1968 Osborne married Felicity Alexandra Loxton-Peacock, daughter of Clarisse Loxton Peacock, of Belgravia, London. They had four children:

- George Gideon Oliver Osborne (b. 23 May 1971), who served as Chancellor of the Exchequer from 2010 to 2016
- Benedict George Osborne (b. 25 July 1973)
- Adam Peter Osborne (b. 25 March 1976)
- Theodore Grantley Osborne (b. 28 March 1985)

== Arms ==
Coat of arms of Osborne of Ballentaylor and Ballylemon

Crest
A sea lion sejant proper holding the dexter paw a trident sable, headed or
Escutcheon
Gules, on a fess or cotised argent two fountains proper, over all a bend of the last
Motto
Pax in bello ("Peace in war")
Other elements
Red Hand of Ulster

== See also ==
- Osborne & Little
- Osborne baronets
- George Osborne

Baronetage of Ireland
Preceded by George Francis Osborne	Baronet (of Ballentaylor and Ballylemon); 1960–present	Incumbent
