= George Osborne =

British newspaper editor and politician (born 1971)

The Right Honourable George Osborne CH
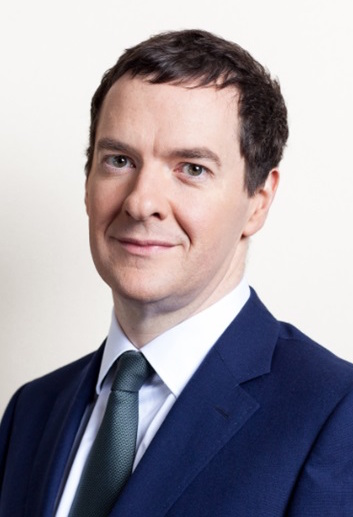
- Official portrait, 2015

First Secretary of State
- In office 8 May 2015 – 13 July 2016
- Prime Minister: David Cameron
- Preceded by: William Hague
- Succeeded by: Damian Green (Note: Office vacant between July 2016 and June 2017)

Chancellor of the Exchequer
- In office 11 May 2010 – 13 July 2016
- Prime Minister: David Cameron
- Preceded by: Alistair Darling
- Succeeded by: Philip Hammond
Shadow Cabinet posts
Shadow Chancellor of the Exchequer
In office 10 May 2005 – 11 May 2010
Leader	Michael Howard; David Cameron
Preceded by	Oliver Letwin
Succeeded by	Alistair Darling
Shadow Chief Secretary to the Treasury
In office 14 June 2004 – 10 May 2005
Leader	Michael Howard
Preceded by	Howard Flight
Succeeded by	Philip Hammond

Member of Parliament for Tatton
- In office 7 June 2001 – 3 May 2017
- Preceded by: Martin Bell
- Succeeded by: Esther McVey

Personal details
- Born: Gideon Oliver Osborne; 23 May 1971 (age 55) Paddington, London, England
- Party: Conservative
- Spouses: Frances Howell (m. 1998; div. 2019) Thea Rogers (m. 2023)
- Children: 5
- Parent(s): Sir Peter Osborne, 17th Baronet; Felicity Loxton-Peacock
- Education: Magdalen College, Oxford (BA)
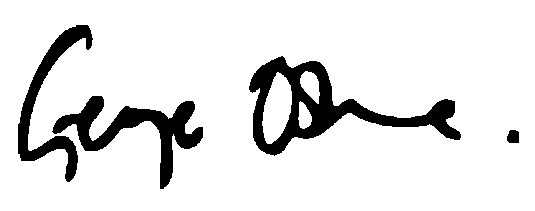
- Signature
- George Osborne's voice Osborne explains the 2015 Spending Review; Recorded 21 July 2015

George Gideon Oliver Osborne CH (born 23 May 1971) is a British former politician and newspaper editor who served as Chancellor of the Exchequer from 2010 to 2016 and First Secretary of State from 2015 to 2016 in the Cameron government. A member of the Conservative Party, he was the Member of Parliament (MP) for Tatton from 2001 to 2017.

The son of the Osborne & Little co-founder and baronet Sir Peter Osborne, Osborne was born in Paddington and educated at Norland Place School, Colet Court and St Paul's School, London, before studying at Magdalen College, Oxford. After working briefly as a freelancer for The Daily Telegraph, he joined the Conservative Research Department in 1994 and became head of its political section. He went on to be a special adviser to the Minister of Agriculture, Fisheries and Food, Douglas Hogg, and to work for John Major at 10 Downing Street, including on Major's unsuccessful 1997 general election campaign. In Opposition he worked as a speechwriter and political secretary to Major's successor as party leader, William Hague. Osborne was elected as MP for Tatton in 2001, becoming the youngest Conservative member of the House of Commons. He was appointed Shadow Chief Secretary to the Treasury by Conservative leader Michael Howard in 2004. In the following year Howard appointed him Shadow Chancellor of the Exchequer, a position Osborne kept after running David Cameron's successful party leadership campaign.

After the 2010 general election, Osborne was appointed Chancellor of the Exchequer in the Cameron–Clegg coalition. He succeeded Alistair Darling, inheriting a large deficit in government finances due to the effects of the 2008 financial crisis. As Chancellor, Osborne's tenure pursued notably severe austerity policies aimed at reducing the budget deficit, and launched the Northern Powerhouse initiative. In 2012, Osborne significantly reduced taxes for the top rate of earners. After the Conservatives won an overall majority in the 2015 general election, Cameron reappointed him Chancellor in his second government and gave him the additional title of First Secretary of State. He was widely viewed as a potential successor to David Cameron as Leader of the Conservative Party; one Conservative MP, Nadhim Zahawi, suggested that the closeness of his relationship with Cameron meant that the two effectively shared power during the duration of the Cameron governments. Following the 2016 referendum vote to leave the European Union and Cameron's consequent resignation, he was dismissed by Cameron's successor, Theresa May.

Osborne served on the backbenches for a year before leaving public office at the 2017 general election. He was editor of the Evening Standard from 2017 to 2020. He has been chair of the Northern Powerhouse Partnership since 2016 and of the British Museum since 2021. He has also hosted the politics podcast Political Currency with Ed Balls since 2023.

== Early life and education ==
Osborne was born in Paddington, London, as Gideon Oliver Osborne. His father is Sir Peter Osborne, 17th Baronet, co-founder of the firm of fabric and wallpaper designers Osborne & Little. His mother is Felicity Alexandra Loxton-Peacock, the daughter of Hungarian-born Jewish artist Clarisse Loxton-Peacock (née Fehér). He is the eldest of four boys. He decided when he was 13 to be known by the additional first name of "George". In an interview in July 2005, he said: "It was my small act of rebellion. I never liked it [the name 'Gideon']. When I finally told my mother she said, 'Nor do I'. So I decided to be George after my grandfather [Sir George Francis Osborne], who was a war hero. Life was easier as a George; it was a straightforward name." Osborne is to inherit his father's baronetcy; he would thus become Sir George Osborne, 18th Baronet.

Osborne was educated at private schools: Norland Place School, Colet Court and St Paul's School. In 1990 he began undergraduate study at Magdalen College, Oxford, having been awarded a demyship there; in 1993 he received an upper second class (2:1) bachelor's degree in Modern History. Whilst there, he was a member of the Bullingdon Club, an exclusive and controversial drinking society. He also attended Davidson College in North Carolina for a semester, as a Dean Rusk Scholar.

In 1993, Osborne intended to pursue a career in journalism. He was shortlisted for, but failed to gain a place on, The Times' trainee scheme; he also applied to The Economist, where he was interviewed and rejected by Gideon Rachman. In the end, he had to settle for freelance work on the 'Peterborough' diary column in The Daily Telegraph. One of his Oxford friends, journalist George Bridges, alerted Osborne some time later to a research vacancy at Conservative Central Office.

== Early political career ==
Osborne joined the Conservative Research Department in 1994, and became head of its Political Section. One of his first roles was to go to Blackpool and observe the October 1994 Labour Party Conference.

Between 1995 and 1997 he worked as a special adviser to Minister of Agriculture, Fisheries and Food Douglas Hogg (during the BSE crisis), and in the Political Office at 10 Downing Street. Osborne worked on Prime Minister John Major's campaign team in 1997, in the run-up to the Tories' heavy election defeat that year. After the election, he again considered journalism, approaching The Times to be a leader writer, though nothing came of it.

Between 1997 and 2001 he worked for William Hague, Major's successor as Conservative Party leader, as a speechwriter and political secretary. He helped to prepare Hague for the weekly session of Prime Minister's Questions, often playing the role of Prime Minister Tony Blair. Under the subsequent leaderships of Michael Howard and David Cameron, he remained on the Prime Minister's Questions team.

== Member of Parliament ==
Osborne was elected as the Member of Parliament (MP) for Tatton, Cheshire, at the June 2001 election. He succeeded Independent MP Martin Bell, who had defeated the controversial former Conservative minister Neil Hamilton in 1997 but had kept his promise not to stand there at the following election. Osborne won with a majority of 8,611 over the Labour candidate, becoming (at that time) the youngest Conservative MP in the House of Commons. At the 2005 election he was re-elected with an increased majority of 11,731 (securing 51.8% of the vote), and in 2010 increased his majority still further to 14,487.

== Shadow Chancellor (2005–2010) ==
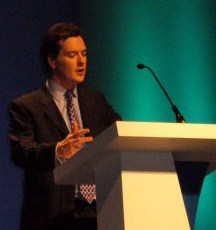
Osborne at Conservative Spring Forum 2006 in Manchester

He was appointed in September 2004 by then Conservative leader Michael Howard to the Shadow Cabinet, as Shadow Chief Secretary to the Treasury.

Following the 2005 general election, Howard promoted him to Shadow Chancellor of the Exchequer at the young age of 33. Howard had initially offered the post to William Hague, who turned it down. Press reports suggest that the second choice for the post was David Cameron, who also rejected the job, preferring to take on a major public service portfolio (he was made Shadow Secretary of State for Education). Thus, Howard seems to have turned to Osborne as his third choice for the role. His promotion prompted speculation he would run for the leadership of the Conservative Party when Howard stepped down, but he ruled himself out within a week. Osborne served as campaign manager for David Cameron's leadership campaign, and kept the Shadow Chancellor's post when Cameron became leader later that year.

When David Cameron was asked in 2009 whether or not he would be willing to sack a close colleague such as Osborne, he stated, "With George, the answer is yes. He stayed in my shadow cabinet not because he is a friend, not because we are godfathers to each other's children but because he is the right person to do the job. I know and he knows that if that was not the case he would not be there."

At this time Osborne expressed an interest in the ideas of "tax simplification" (including the idea of flat tax). He set up a "Tax Reform Commission" in October 2005 to investigate ideas for how to create a "flatter, simpler" tax system. The system then proposed would reduce the income tax rate to a flat 22%, and increase the personal allowance from £4,435 to between £10,000 and £15,500. However, the idea of a flat tax was not included in the 2010 Conservative Party manifesto.

=== Comments on Gordon Brown ===
During Osborne's response to the Chancellor of the Exchequer Gordon Brown's Pre-Budget Report on 5 December 2005, he accused Brown of being "a Chancellor past his sell-by-date, a Chancellor holding Britain back". In an interview the same week, he also referred to Brown as "brutal" and "unpleasant". Osborne was rebuked in October 2006 by Michael Martin, the Speaker of the House of Commons, when he attacked the Chancellor at Oral Questions by citing a comment attributed to the Secretary of State for Work and Pensions John Hutton, describing the Chancellor as likely to make an "effing awful" Prime Minister. It was widely suggested that Osborne was leading an assault on Brown that would allow the Conservatives to discredit him without damaging David Cameron's public image. That month, Osborne faced criticism from some quarters for appearing to suggest that Brown was "faintly autistic". After Osborne spoke in an interview about his own ability to recall odd facts, a host suggested to him that he may have been "faintly autistic"; he responded by saying that "We're not getting onto Gordon Brown yet".

=== Pledge to match Labour spending ===
In September 2007, ahead of the publication of the 2007 Comprehensive Spending Review, Osborne pledged that the Conservative Party would match Labour's public spending plans for the next three years. He promised increases in public spending of 2% a year, and said Labour charges that the Conservatives would cut public spending were "a pack of lies". He also ruled out any "upfront, unfunded tax cuts".

=== Deripaska claim ===
Osborne's school and university contemporary, financier Nathaniel Rothschild, said in October 2008 that Osborne had tried to solicit a £50,000 donation from the Russian aluminium magnate Oleg Deripaska, which would have been a violation of the law against political donations by foreign citizens. Rothschild had hosted Deripaska, Osborne, Peter Mandelson and others at a party in his villa in Corfu. The alleged solicitation of a donation occurred on Deripaska's yacht during the party.

The Electoral Commission received a formal complaint initiated in a letter by the Liberal Democrats' Home Affairs spokesperson, Chris Huhne, urging them to investigate the allegations against Osborne. The Commission rejected the claims and said it saw "no information" suggesting an offence. The accusation was referred to by the press as 'Yachtgate'. Osborne denied claims he had attempted to solicit a donation from Deripaska and said that he had "made a mistake" by meeting with him.

=== "Run on the pound" ===
On 14 November 2008, in an intervention described by the BBC's Nick Robinson as "pretty extraordinary", Osborne publicly warned that the more the government borrows, the less attractive sterling becomes to hold. He said: "We are in danger, if the government is not careful, of having a proper sterling collapse, a run on the pound." Labelling Gordon Brown's tactic a "scorched-earth policy" that a future Conservative government would have to clear up, Osborne continued: "His view is he probably won't win the next election. The Tories can clear this mess up after I've gone."

=== Expenses ===
In 2009 and 2012 Osborne was criticised for his expense claims, in particular for the claims for mortgage interest payments on his Cheshire properties. Osborne had funded the purchase of a country farmhouse and adjoining paddock in Cheshire before he became an MP in 2001 by way of a £455,000 extension of the mortgage on his London home. In 2003 he substituted a new £450,000 mortgage on the Cheshire property, which he then designated as his second home, or "flipped". As a result, he was able to claim up to £100,000 in mortgage interest on the house and paddock between 2003 and 2010, when the regulations changed. In 2012 it was revealed that the paddock had been legally separate from the farmhouse.

The Liberal Democrats said he had a "moral obligation" to pay an estimated £55,000 in capital gains tax to the public purse which he had saved through the designation or "flipping" of his London property as his main home. He had previously paid back £1,193 spent on chauffeur fares and overpayments on his mortgage after a complaint from a Labour activist, and it also emerged that he had claimed £47 for two copies of a DVD of his own speech on "value for taxpayers' money". The report of the Parliamentary Commissioner for Standards found that although Osborne had breached the rules, the offence was "unintended and relatively minor". Osborne said he had received "flawed" advice and not benefited personally.

=== 2010 general election campaign ===
During the 2010 general election campaign Osborne was considered to have been sidelined, owing to his perceived unpopularity and the perception by both Liberal Democrat and Labour strategists that he was a "weak link".

== Chancellor of the Exchequer (2010–2016) ==
Osborne was appointed Chancellor of the Exchequer on 11 May 2010, and was sworn in as a Privy Counsellor two days later. On 4 October 2010, in a speech at the Conservative conference in Birmingham, Osborne announced a cap on the overall amount of benefits a family can receive from the state, estimated to be around £500 a week from 2013. He also announced that he would end the universal entitlement to child benefit, and that from 2013 the entitlement would be removed from people paying the 40% and 50% income tax rates.

In February 2011 Osborne announced Project Merlin, whereby banks aimed to lend about £190 billion to businesses in 2011, curb bonuses and reveal some salary details of their top earners; meanwhile, the bank levy would increase by £800 million. Osborne's 2011 Autumn Statement was delivered to Parliament on 29 November 2011. It included a programme of supply-side economic reforms such as investments in infrastructure intended to support economic growth.

In 2012, Osborne cut the 50% income tax rate on top earners and figures from Her Majesty's Revenue and Customs showed that the amount of additional-rate tax paid had increased under the new rate from £38 billion in 2012/13 to £46 billion in 2013/14, which Osborne said was caused by the new rate being more "competitive", however HMRC predictions in March 2012 predicted that around £6.25 billion in tax revenue would be delayed from 2012/13 to 2013/14 due to the expected lower tax rate, possibly explaining much of the increased revenue, and that the change would cost around £2.4 billion in 2012, however this cost would decrease and was expected to be nullified by 2016/17. In October 2012, Osborne proposed a new policy to boost the hiring of staff, under which companies would be able to give new appointees shares worth between £2,000 and £50,000, but the appointees would lose the right to claim unfair dismissal and time off for training.

In February 2013, the UK lost its AAA credit rating—which Osborne had indicated to be a priority when coming to power—for the first time since 1978. His March 2013 budget was made when the Office for Budget Responsibility had halved its forecast for that year's economic growth from 1.2% to 0.6%.

Osborne announced on 16 May that he would deliver a second Budget on 8 July, and promised action on tax avoidance by the rich by bringing in a "Google tax" designed to discourage large companies diverting profits out of the UK to avoid tax. The second Budget also increased funding for the National Health Service, more apprenticeships, efforts to increase productivity and cuts to the welfare budget. The July budget postponed the predicted arrival of a UK surplus from 2019 to 2020, and included an extra £18 billion more borrowing for 2016–20 than planned for the same period in March.

In Osborne's 2016 budget he introduced a sugar tax and raised the tax-free allowance for income tax to £11,500, as well as lifting the 40% income tax threshold to £45,000. According to The Guardian, Osborne was "the driving force" behind the BBC licence fee agreement which saw the BBC responsible for funding the £700 million welfare cost of free TV licences for the over-75s, meaning that it lost almost 20% of its income. The Guardian also noted Osborne's four meetings with News Corp representatives and two meetings with Rupert Murdoch before the deal was announced. Following the UK's vote to leave the European Union in June 2016, Osborne pledged to further lower corporation tax to "encourage businesses to continue investing in the UK". Osborne had already cut the corporation tax rate from 28% to 20%, with plans to lower it to 17% by 2020.

=== Reception ===
Osborne's chancellorship has been subject to much critical assessment. His austerity measures are generally now viewed as having failed to reduce unemployment, lower interest rates, or stimulate growth. Extensive cuts in his 2010 budget to benefits, meant to force beneficiaries into work, have been linked to a steep rise in inequality. While the Gini coefficient for disposable income in 2011–12 fell to 32.3 per cent, the lowest level since 1986, it quickly rose again. Reviewing his performance in July 2016, The Guardian said that the UK still had a budget deficit of 4%, a balance-of-payments (trade) deficit of 7% of GDP, and (apart from Italy) the worst productivity among the G7 nations. An Office for National Statistics graph including the period 2010–2016 shows a worsening balance-of-trade deficit. One study by the Progressive Economy Forum assessed that the United Kingdom lost £540 billion in public spending since Osborne initiated austerity measures. The study claimed he could have "maintained historic rates of growth in public spending and still have reduced Britain's government debt burden by 2019". Another by the New Economics Foundation claimed austerity had shrunk the British economy by £100 billion by 2019, due to its slower growth in every year since 2010. The Institute for Public Policy Research (IPPR) issued a report in 2019 claiming that austerity was linked to 130,000 preventable deaths since 2012. That was the year of the 2012 United Kingdom budget– dubbed the "omnishambles budget" by the then Labour leader Ed Miliband – viewed as the nadir of Osborne's political fortunes. Osborne reduced taxation for the wealthy, cutting the 50% income tax rate on top earners – which he said had been specially designated by his predecessor as "temporary" – to 45%.

Overall, Osborne's policies have been linked to worsened inequality and poverty, a rise in political instability, and, allegedly, the decline of the NHS. After polling in 2012 revealed Osborne to be the least popular member of parliament, he was loudly booed by the crowd while presenting medals at the London Paralympics. In 2023, the magazine Prospect also described Osborne as the "architect of austerity" and described him as the worst chancellor in postwar British history, second perhaps only to Kwasi Kwarteng (who served 38 days).

== Political views ==
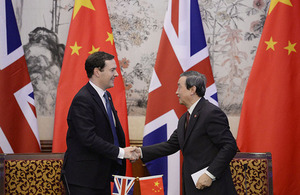
Osborne at an official visit to China in October 2013

The Financial Times describes Osborne as "metropolitan and socially liberal. He is hawkish on foreign policy with links to Washington neo-conservatives and ideologically committed to cutting the state. A pragmatic Eurosceptic". There is evidence of this commitment to cutting the state in his party's manifesto, with Osborne and the Conservatives seeking to cut the deficit "faster and deeper" than any other main party as well as committing to various tax cuts such as inheritance tax and national insurance. According to an IFS report before the 2010 general election, the Conservatives needed to find more money from cuts beyond what they had outlined than any other major party, although the report was also critical of Labour and the Liberal Democrats. He has stated that the British economy must diversify away from London following the 2008 banking crisis, most notably in the form of the Northern Powerhouse policy proposals which aim to improve transport links and boost science and technology investment in the cities of the North in order to increase economic output.

After previously drawing parallels between Ed Miliband's economic views and those of Karl Marx in Das Kapital, in a 2017 interview with former Treasury colleague Lord O'Neill, Osborne said Marx's thesis in Das Kapital that capitalists would take an increasing share of wealth from the proceeds of economic production at the expense of workers could be argued as an accurate description of something that appeared to be occurring under the process of globalization, arguing that there was a need to "democratise capital" and ensure "that people have more capital in capitalism", such as larger pensions and more opportunities for savings and home and share ownership.

=== Brexit ===
At the time of the 2016 referendum Osborne was prominently in favour of the UK remaining in the EU.

== Political relationships ==
Whilst David Cameron was prime minister, Osborne was widely viewed as a potential future leader of the Conservatives were Cameron to stand down and trigger a leadership contest, despite being seen as a relatively unpopular figure with the general public. Conservative MP Nadhim Zahawi suggested that the closeness of his relationship with Cameron meant the two effectively shared power in the 2010–16 government, whilst commentators pointed to Osborne's hand in Cabinet reshuffles. He worked hard on rebuilding his image after the much-criticised 2012 budget.

Michael Deacon of The Daily Telegraph has described Osborne as "the prince of the parliamentary putdown" after, during one House of Commons debate, he managed to taunt both Ed Balls and Norman Baker in one sentence. Osborne denied rumours that he had referred to his colleague Iain Duncan Smith as "not clever enough", which were published in Matthew d'Ancona's book In It Together.

On 28 June 2016, Osborne ruled out standing as a candidate in that year's party leadership election, stating he was "not the person to provide the unity" his party needed.

== Backbencher (2016–2017) ==
Osborne was sacked by Theresa May on 13 July 2016, following her appointment as Prime Minister. He returned to the backbenches and Philip Hammond replaced him as Chancellor. It was announced on 4 August 2016 that Osborne was to be made a Member of the Order of the Companions of Honour in the Resignation Honours list following David Cameron's resignation. Unlike Cameron, Osborne intended to remain an MP and stand for Parliament again in 2020, although proposed boundary changes could have led to the abolition of his Tatton constituency.

In September 2016, he launched the Northern Powerhouse Partnership, a body bringing together business leaders and politicians to promote regional devolution.

By October 2016, he was writing a book called Age of Unreason; it is a diatribe against "populist nationalism". Osborne's lucrative speaking engagements for a range of financial institutions since his dismissal as Chancellor helped make him the highest earning MP in 2016. In February 2017 he started a new role as a part-time advisor to BlackRock, the world's largest fund manager, for a salary of £650,000 for a one-day a week. The job was approved by the Advisory Committee on Business Appointments, which stated that during Osborne's time as Chancellor "there were no specific policy decisions ... that would have affected BlackRock", and the Permanent Secretary at the Treasury had "no concerns" about Osborne taking up the role.

In 2017, Osborne became the first Kissinger Fellow at the McCain Institute for International Leadership. While the institute is based in John McCain's home state of Arizona, Osborne remained in the UK.

Osborne announced he would be standing down as MP for Tatton in April 2017, a day after the 2017 general election was declared. He did not rule out returning to the Commons at some point. "It's still too early to be writing my memoirs", he wrote in a letter to his constituency party, adding he did not "want to spend the rest of my life just being an ex-chancellor. I want new challenges".

== Career after Parliament ==
=== Evening Standard editor ===
Then still an MP, Osborne was announced on 17 March 2017 as the next editor of the Evening Standard, a position which he assumed on 2 May. Critics of his appointment questioned his lack of journalistic experience and his intention to remain MP for Tatton during his tenure with the newspaper, which other MPs said would constitute a conflict of interest and devalued the role of an MP. He was also accused of breaking the post-ministerial employment rules of the Advisory Committee on Business Appointments by accepting the editorship without the committee's approval.

Private Eye subsequently documented in detail the relationship between Osborne and Standard owner Evgeny Lebedev, who appointed Osborne as editor. During Osborne's time as Chancellor of the Exchequer he regularly pledged Treasury money to Standard charitable campaigns, such as his offer in 2015 to match readers' donations by up to £1.5 million to the Standard's Great Ormond Street Hospital appeal. In September 2015, the newspaper ranked Osborne in joint-first place on its annual 'Progress 1000' list of the most influential people in London. It was also highlighted that, as Chancellor, Osborne failed to tackle the advantageous tax status for so-called non-doms, which Lebedev was understood to benefit from, while Lebedev's paper strongly supported the Conservative Party in the 2015 general election and the Conservatives' candidate Zac Goldsmith in the 2016 London mayoral election.

After stepping down from politics, Osborne took on several engagements in addition to his work as editor. Among them was being named a distinguished visiting fellow at the Hoover Institution and a dean's fellow at the Stanford Graduate School of Business in September 2017. He specialised in research on international politics and the global economy. He continued to advise the asset manager BlackRock and also began advising his brother's firm 9Yards Capital. He joined 9Yards, a growth stage venture capital firm focused on financial technology and IT logistics investments, in 2018 as a partner and chairman.

In mid-2018, the Standard reported a loss of £10 million for the last year to the end of September. That year the paper dropped 'London' from its title to reflect greater national and international ambitions as part of a relaunch. For 2018, the Standard reported a £11.5 million loss amid speculation of "ad struggles".

In February 2020, questions were raised about Osborne's future at the Standard. On 12 June it was announced that he would step down as editor to move to the role of editor-in-chief. He was succeeded as editor by the former deputy editor of British Vogue and sister-in-law of David Cameron, Emily Sheffield, on 1 July 2020.

=== Comment on Theresa May ===
In a profile of Osborne published by Esquire magazine in September 2017, it was said that he had commented to several staff at the Evening Standard that he would not be satisfied until Theresa May was "chopped up in bags in my freezer". While Osborne had used macabre imagery about May in the past, he did not directly comment on the incident, although he was criticised for the alleged remark. An editorial in the Standard, published nearly a week later, was interpreted as Osborne's apology to May. It said "harsh words" had been said in connection with the Prime Minister's Brexit policy, but "intemperate language, even when said in jest" was inappropriate.

=== Attempts to return to politics ===
In 2018 Osborne was discussed as a potential candidate for Mayor of London in the election scheduled to be held in 2020. He said that as well as considering a bid, he would not rule out a return to Parliament. However, in an interview he said he would not stand for mayor as it would clash with his role as editor of the Evening Standard.

In July 2019, the Financial Times reported that Osborne was seeking backing to replace Christine Lagarde as managing director of the International Monetary Fund (IMF). Osborne needed to be nominated by directors on the IMF's executive board, who were elected by member countries, to enter the contest. Both European and British government sources said that Osborne, who backed Boris Johnson in the Conservative Party leadership election, would likely be the British nomination, due in part to Johnson's accession to Prime Minister. Lagarde's replacement was to be selected by the executive board, where the United States, Japan and China held the largest shares of the total vote. Several UK government figures, including Chancellor of the Exchequer Sajid Javid, endorsed Osborne for the role. Boris Johnson spoke to US President Donald Trump in a phone call to rally support for Osborne. On 6 September 2019, Osborne abandoned his IMF leadership attempt, and sources later confirmed that the chief executive of the World Bank, Kristalina Georgieva, had been put forward as the European Union's nominee.

=== Career diversification ===
In August 2020, Osborne's name was suggested as a possible candidate for chairman of the BBC as, according to the i newspaper, he had maintained "good relations" with Boris Johnson. In October The Telegraph reported that ministers had raised the salary cap to £160,000 a year for the role, and that they might have raised it further to £280,000 in order to tempt Osborne. Richard Sharp was later appointed.

Osborne left his roles at the Evening Standard and BlackRock in March 2021, and in April became an investment banker at Robey Warshaw.

In June 2021, it was announced that British Museum had unanimously elected Osborne as its chairman. He joined the museum's board of trustees on 1 September 2021 and formally became chairman on 4 October 2021.

On 25 September 2022, Osborne and Ed Balls became regular commentators on The Andrew Neil Show on Channel 4. Subsequently, on 14 September 2023, Osborne and Balls started hosting the economics-focused politics podcast Political Currency.

In December 2025, Osborne took up a role with artificial intelligence firm OpenAI, leading the company's dealings with governments around the world.

== In popular culture ==
Osborne was portrayed by Sebastian Armesto in the 2015 Channel 4 television film Coalition.

== Personal life ==
Osborne is heir apparent to his family's Irish baronetcy, of Ballentaylor and Ballylemon in County Waterford. In 2009, he had an estimated personal fortune of around £4 million, as the beneficiary of a trust fund that owns a 15% stake in Osborne & Little, the wallpaper-and-fabrics company co-founded by his father, Sir Peter Osborne.

Osborne married Frances Howell, author and elder daughter of Lord Howell of Guildford, a Conservative politician, on 4 April 1998. They have two children—Luke Benedict (born 15 June 2001) and Liberty Kate (born 27 June 2003)—who were both born in Westminster.

In May 2018, The Daily Telegraph reported that Osborne and his siblings had discovered "with delight" that their maternal grandmother Clarisse Loxton-Peacock (a Hungarian émigrée) was Jewish, and therefore that in Jewish law they are Jewish too.

In July 2019, Osborne and his wife announced that they were to divorce.

In April 2021, Osborne announced his engagement to Thea Rogers after two years of dating. Rogers had been recruited from the BBC, as his special adviser and later became Chief of Staff, while he was Chancellor. The couple's first child, a son named Beau, was born on 15 July 2021. Rogers gave birth to their second child, a son named Arthur, on 30 December 2022. Before their wedding in July 2023, a poison pen email was circulated. The couple were married on 8 July 2023. A protester, initially believed to be from the environmental group Just Stop Oil, threw orange confetti over them as they left the church following the wedding ceremony. Just Stop Oil denied responsibility for the incident. The couple welcomed a third son, Pax, in February 2024.

== Honours ==
- 13 May 2010: appointed to the Privy Council of the United Kingdom, giving the honorific style of "The Right Honourable" for life.
- 4 August 2016: appointed Member of the Order of the Companions of Honour in David Cameron's Resignation Honours. This appointment granted him the Post Nominal Letters "CH" for Life.

=== Awards ===
- 2015 British GQ Politician of the Year award

== See also ==
- Osborne baronets
- United Kingdom government austerity programme

Parliament of the United Kingdom
Preceded by Martin Bell	Member of Parliament for Tatton; 2001–2017	Succeeded by Esther McVey
Political offices
Preceded by Howard Flight	Shadow Chief Secretary to the Treasury; 2004–2005	Succeeded by Philip Hammond
Preceded by Oliver Letwin	Shadow Chancellor of the Exchequer; 2005–2010	Succeeded by Alistair Darling
Preceded by Alistair Darling	Chancellor of the Exchequer; 2010–2016	Succeeded by Philip Hammond
Preceded by Alistair Darling	Second Lord of the Treasury; 2010–2016	Succeeded by Philip Hammond
Preceded by William Hague	First Secretary of State; 2015–2016	Vacant Title next held by Damian Green
Media offices
Preceded by Sarah Sands	Editor of the Evening Standard; 2017–2020	Succeeded by Emily Sheffield
Business positions
Preceded by Sir Richard Lambert	Chairman of the British Museum; 2021–present	Incumbent
