= Clarisse Loxton Peacock =

Hungarian-born artist

Clarisse Loxton Peacock, born Klára Fehér (died 2004) was a Hungarian-born artist, later styled Lady Dunnett. An admirer of the Italian still life painter Giorgio Morandi, she was particularly known for her own still life compositions, though later in life also painted stylised human forms.

== Life ==
Klára Fehér was born to a Jewish family in Budapest, the daughter of Isobel Fehér. One source gives her date of birth as 7 May 1926, while other sources give her year of birth as 1928. Her Times obituarist reported her age at death as a "closely guarded secret", and she was later reported to have been 90 when she died in 2004.

After study at Budapest University, Fehér came to Bristol, England to study art, matriculating at Bristol University. In one interview she is said to have been eighteen years old when she arrived in England. She trained at the Chelsea School of Art. She went on to postgraduate study at Saint Martin's School of Art and the Central School of Art and Design.

Fehér married the English businessman Grantley Loxton Peacock some time before 1959. She sold her first paintings to the Walker Art Gallery and the San Francisco Museum of Art. After her first exhibition in 1959, her paintings would appear in 17 shows in London, Germany, New York and Paris. The Salon de Paris awarded her the Medaille d'argent.

In 1968 her daughter Felicity married Sir Peter Osborne, 17th Baronet: their eldest son would be the politician and newspaper editor George Osborne. In the mid-1970s Clarisse Loxton Peacock commuted between the family house in Kensington and Paris, where her husband was working. He died in 1979, and she married Sir Anthony Grover, the Chairman of Lloyd's Register of Shipping. Sir Anthony died in 1981, and in 1983 she married Sir James Dunnett. Her last exhibition was in 1996. After her third husband died in 1997, she gave up painting, no longer feeling she could keep standing to paint.

She died on 24 July 2004.
