= James Macaulay Higginson =

Anglo-Irish colonial administrator

Sir James Macaulay Higginson (1805 – 28 June 1885) was an Anglo-Irish colonial administrator who was Governor of Antigua from 1847 to 1850.

== Early life ==
Higginson was born in County Antrim, Ireland, the son of Major James Higginson and Mary Macaulay. He was educated at Trinity College, Dublin.

== Career ==
He entered the Bengal Army in 1824. He was secretary to Sir Charles Metcalfe, administrator in British India, and accompanied him when Metcalfe was posted to Jamaica and then Canada. He was the eighth Governor of Mauritius. from 8 January 1851 to 20 September 1857.

He was appointed Companion of the Order of the Bath in 1851 and Knight Commander of the Order in 1857.

== Personal life ==
In 1835 Higginson married Louisa Shakespear, the eldest daughter of Henry Davenport Shakespear, in Calcutta. Secondly, he married Olivia Nichola Dobbs at Leamington Spa, on 11 November 1854. A daughter of his second marriage, Sydney Harriet Maude Higginson, married Sir John Charles Kennedy, 3rd Baronet, in 1879.

He died on 28 June 1885 in Tulfarris, County Wicklow, aged 79.

Government offices
Preceded by Sir George William Anderson	Governor of Mauritius; 1851–1857	Succeeded by Sir William Stevenson
