= The Rug Company =

British rug brand

- Founded: 1997
- Founder: Christopher and Suzanne Sharpe

The Rug Company is a British rug brand founded in 1997 by Christopher and Suzanne Sharp. The company is known for producing handmade rugs, cushions and wallhangings. Its collections often feature collaborations with international designers and artists.

== History ==
The Rug Company was established in London in 1997 by husband-and-wife duo Christopher and Suzanne Sharp. Its rugs are primarily hand-knotted using traditional Tibetan knot techniques (Tibetan rug). In November 2015, private equity firm Palamon Capital Partners acquired a majority stake in The Rug Company.
