= County Waterford (Parliament of Ireland constituency) =

Pre-1801 Irish constituency

- Former county constituency for the Irish House of Commons
- County: County Waterford

–1801
- Seats: 2
- Replaced by: County Waterford (UKHC)

County Waterford was a constituency represented in the Irish House of Commons until 1800.

== Members of Parliament ==
- 1376: Richard Botiller and David Cogan were elected to come to England to consult with the king and council about the government of Ireland and about an aid for the king.
- 1560 Thomas Power and Peter Aylwarde
- 1585 Richard Aylwarde and James Sherlock
- 1613–1615 Sir James Gough and John Power of Compyer
- 1634–1635 James Walshe and John Power of Dowshill
- 1639–1649 Sir Richard Osborne, 1st Baronet and John Power of Dowshill
- 1661–1666 Richard Power of Curraghmore (succeeded to peerage, 1661 and replaced by James, Lord Annesley) and Sir Richard Osborne, 1st Baronet

=== 1689–1801 ===
Election	First MP	Second MP
1689	John Power	Matthew Hore
1692	Edward FitzGerald-Villiers	Joseph Ivey
1695	Hon. Henry Petty	John Mason
1703	William Steuart	John Mason
1715	Edward May	Stephen Stanley
1725	Edward May	James May
1727	Edward May	Sir John Osborne, 7t Bt
1730	Lord Villiers	Sir John Osborne, 7t Bt
1733	James May	Sir John Osborne, 7t Bt
October 1735	Ambrose Congreve	Sir John Osborne, 7t Bt
December 1735	Beverley Ussher	Sir John Osborne, 7t Bt
1743	Beverley Ussher	Thomas Christmas
1749	Beverley Ussher	Aland Mason
1757	Lord La Poer	Aland Mason
1759	Lord La Poer	James May
1761	Hon. John Beresford	James May
1798	Hon. John Beresford	Richard Power
1801	Constituency replaced by County Waterford	
