= John Beresford (Waterford MP) =

Anglo-Irish statesman (1738–1805)

The Right Honourable John de la Poer Beresford PC, PC (Ire)
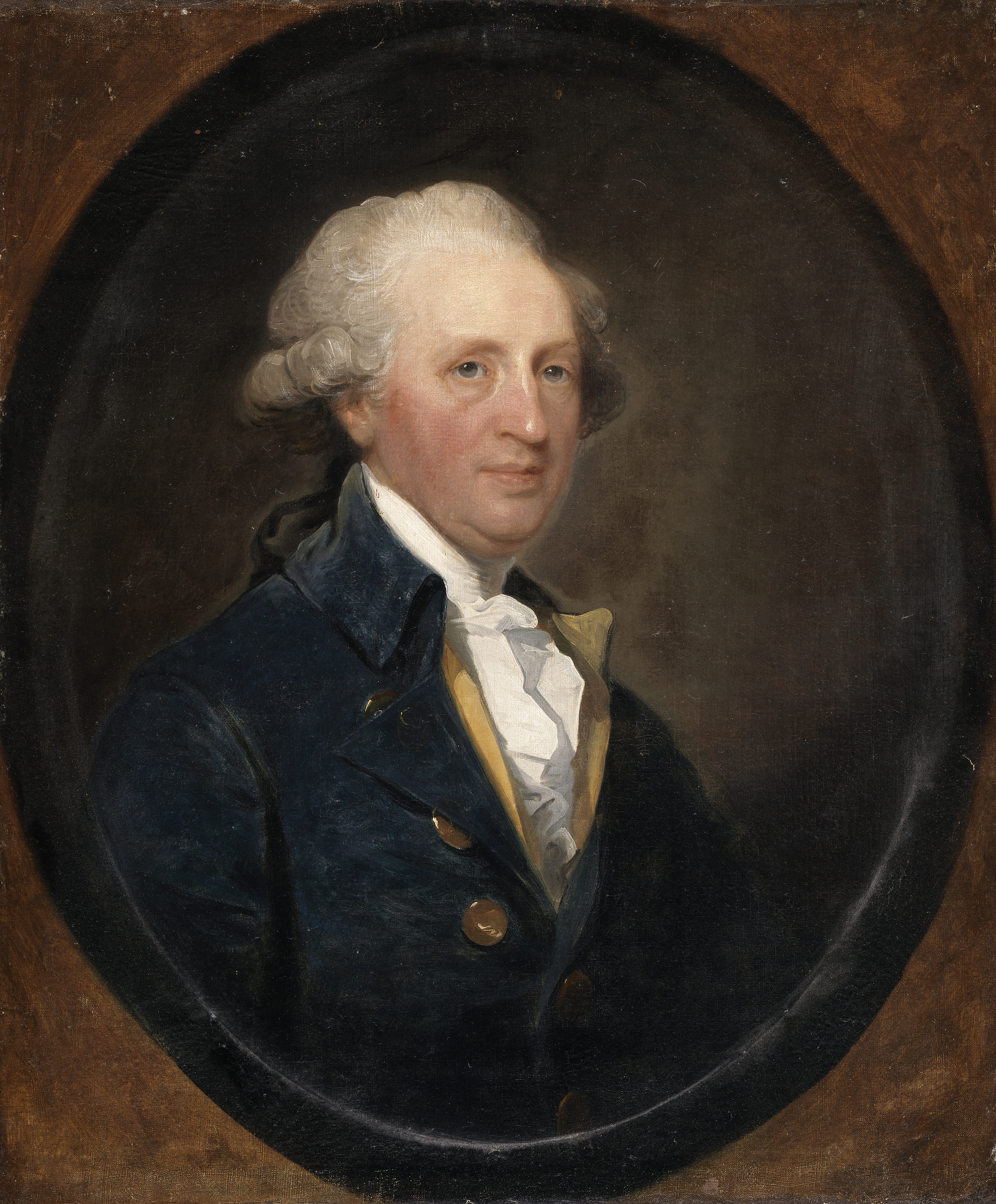
- Born: 14 March 1738
- Died: 5 November 1805 (aged 67)
- Spouse(s): Constantia Ligondes (died 1772); Barbara Montgomery (married 1774)
- Children: John Claudius Beresford
- Parent(s): Marcus Beresford, 1st Earl of Tyrone; Catherine de la Poer

John de la Poer Beresford, PC, PC (Ire) (14 March 1738 – 5 November 1805) was an Anglo-Irish statesman.

== Background and education ==
Beresford was a younger son of Sir Marcus Beresford, who, having married Catherine, sole heiress of James Power, 3rd Earl of Tyrone, was created Earl of Tyrone in 1746. After the death of the earl in 1763, Beresford's mother successfully asserted her claim suo jure to the barony of La Poer. John Beresford thus inherited powerful family connections. He was educated at Kilkenny College, Trinity College Dublin and was called to the Irish bar.

== Political career ==
Beresford entered the Irish House of Commons as member for County Waterford in 1761. In 1768, 1783, 1789 and finally in 1798, he stood also for Coleraine, however choosing each time to sit for County Waterford.

His industry, added to the influence of his family, procured his admission to the Privy Council of Ireland in 1768, and his appointment as one of the commissioners of revenue two years later. In 1780 he became first commissioner of revenue, a position which gave him powerful influence in the Irish administration. He introduced some useful reforms in the machinery of taxation; and he was the author of many improvements in the architecture of the public buildings and streets of Dublin. He was first brought into conflict with Henry Grattan and the popular party, in 1784, by his support of the proposal that the Irish parliament in return for the removal of restrictions on Irish trade should be bound to adopt the English navigation laws.

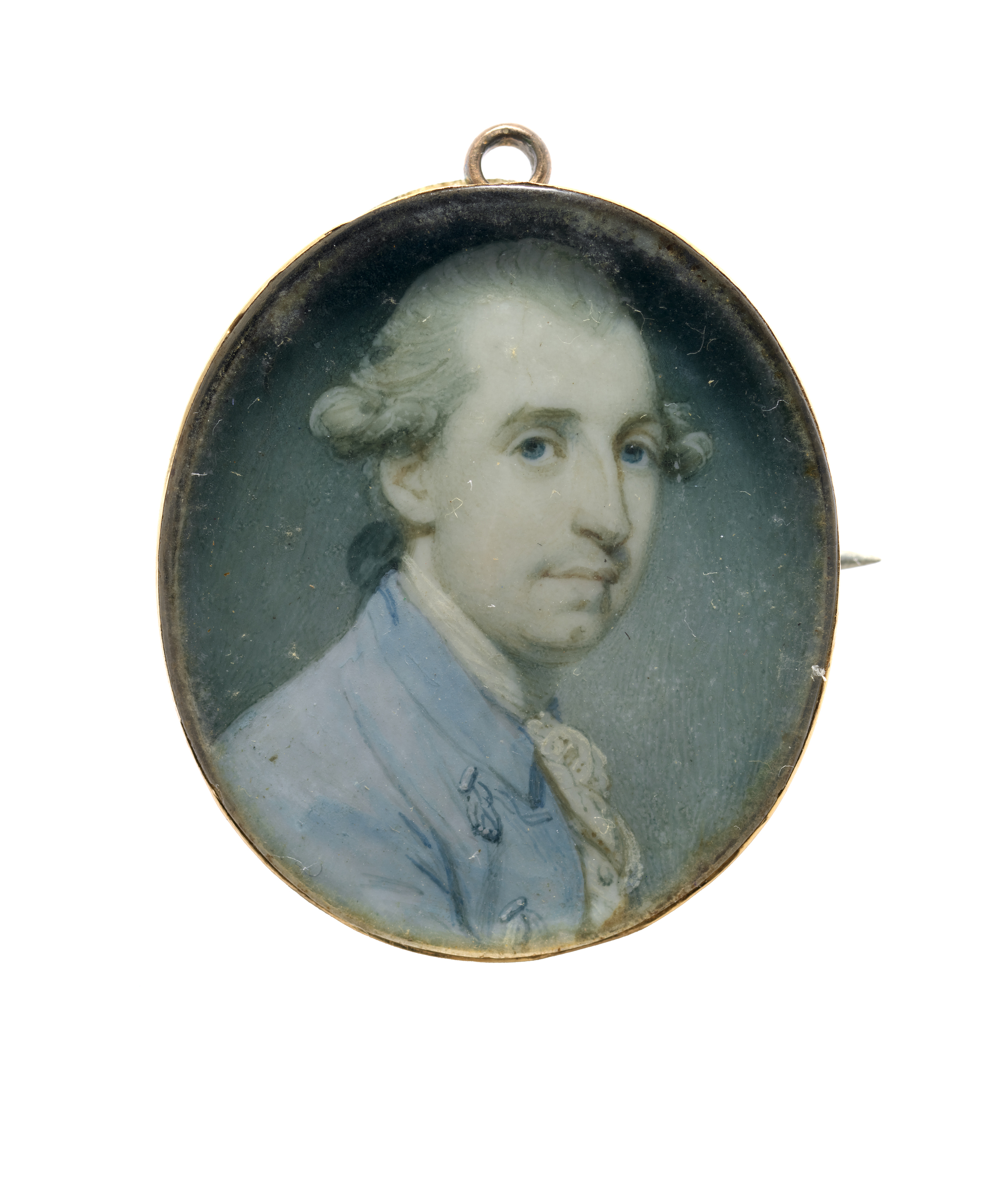
miniature by Richard Crosse

In 1786, he was sworn a member of the Privy Council of Great Britain, and the power which he wielded in Ireland through his numerous dependants and connections grew to be so extensive that a few years later he was spoken of as the 'King of Ireland'. He was a vehement opponent of the increasing demand for Catholic Emancipation; and when it became known that the Earl FitzWilliam was to succeed Westmorland as Lord Lieutenant in 1795 for the purpose of carrying out a conciliatory policy, Beresford expressed strong hostility to the appointment. One of Fitzwilliam's first acts was to dismiss Beresford from his employment for corruption, but with permission to retain his entire official salary for life, and with the assurance that no other member of his family would be removed. FitzWilliam had been encouraged in this course of action by William Ponsonby. Beresford immediately exerted all his influence with his friends in England, to whom he described himself as an injured and persecuted man; he appealed to Pitt, and went in person to London to lay his complaint before the English ministers.

The recall of FitzWilliam, which was followed by such momentous consequences in the history of Ireland, was, as the viceroy himself believed, mainly due to Beresford's dismissal. There had been a misunderstanding on the point between Pitt and FitzWilliam. The latter, whose veracity was unimpeachable, asserted that previous to his coming to Ireland he had informed the prime minister of his intention to dismiss Beresford, and that Pitt had raised no objection. Pitt denied all recollection of any such communication, and on the contrary described the dismissal as an open breach of the most solemn promise. In a letter to Lord Carlisle, justifying his action, FitzWilliam mentioned that malversation had been imputed to Beresford. Beresford sent a challenge to FitzWilliam, but the combatants were interrupted on the field and FitzWilliam then made an apology.

When The Earl Camden replaced FitzWilliam in the viceroyalty in March 1795, Beresford resumed his former position. On the eve of the rebellion in 1798 his letters to Lord Auckland gave an alarming description of the condition of Ireland and he counselled strong measures of repression. When first consulted by Pitt on the question of the union Beresford appears to have disliked the idea; but he soon became reconciled to the policy and warmly supported it. After the union Beresford continued to represent County Waterford in the imperial parliament, and he remained in office until 1802, taking an active part in settling the financial relations between Ireland and Great Britain.

== Family ==
John Beresford was twice married: in 1760 to Constantia Ligondes, who died in 1772; and, secondly, in 1774 to Barbara Montgomery, daughter of Sir William Montgomery, 1st Baronet, a celebrated beauty who figures in Sir Joshua Reynolds's picture of The Graces. He had large families by both marriages. His sons included Marcus Beresford, George Beresford, John Claudius Beresford and Rev. Charles Cobbe Beresford, who married his aunt, Amelia, daughter of Sir William Montgomery, 1st Baronet.

He died near Derry, Ireland, on 5 November 1805.

He resided mainly at Abbeville, Dublin while also owning a house on Dominick Street, Dublin.

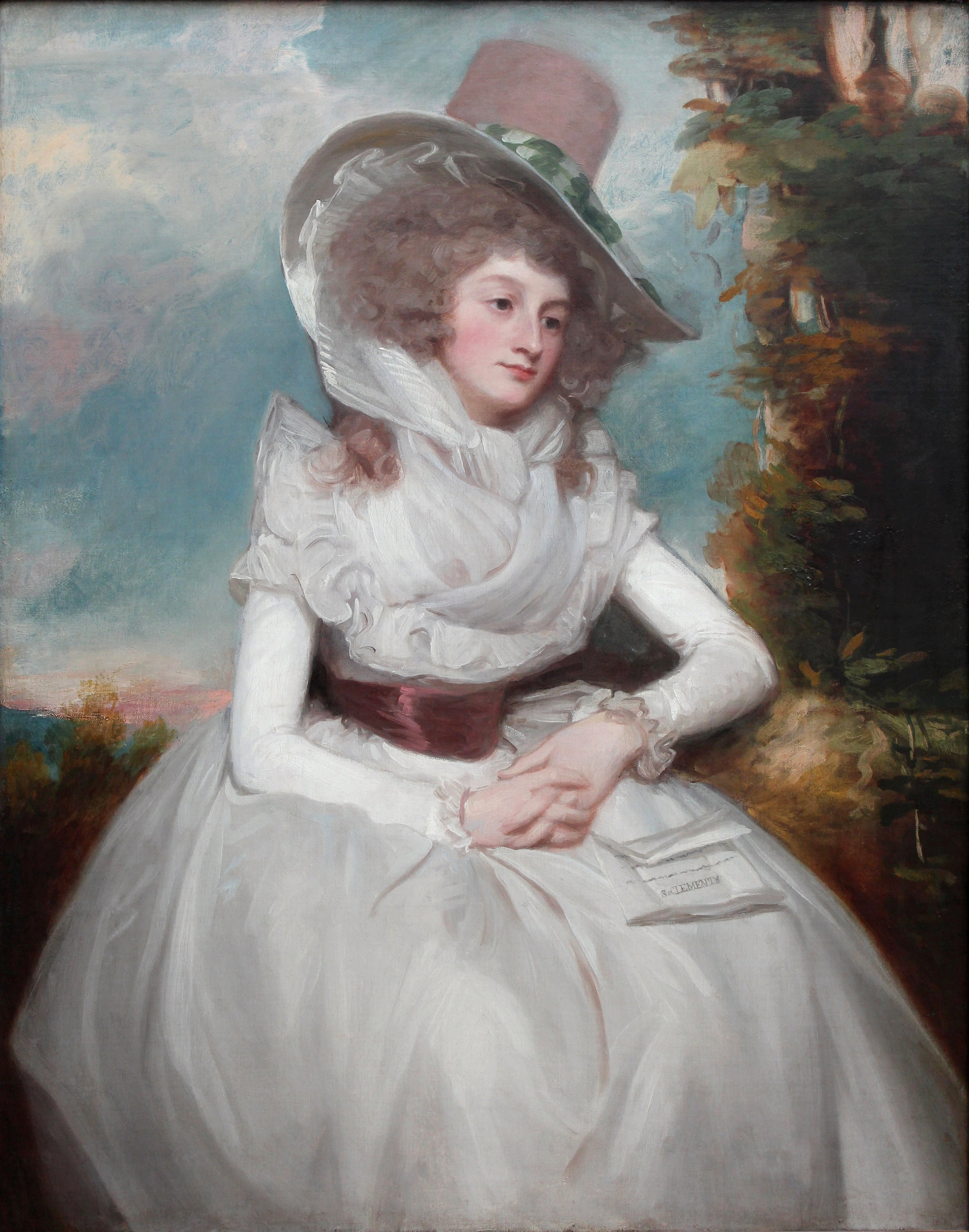
Catherine Beresford (1760-1836), eldest daughter of John Beresford. Portrait by George Romney, 1788.

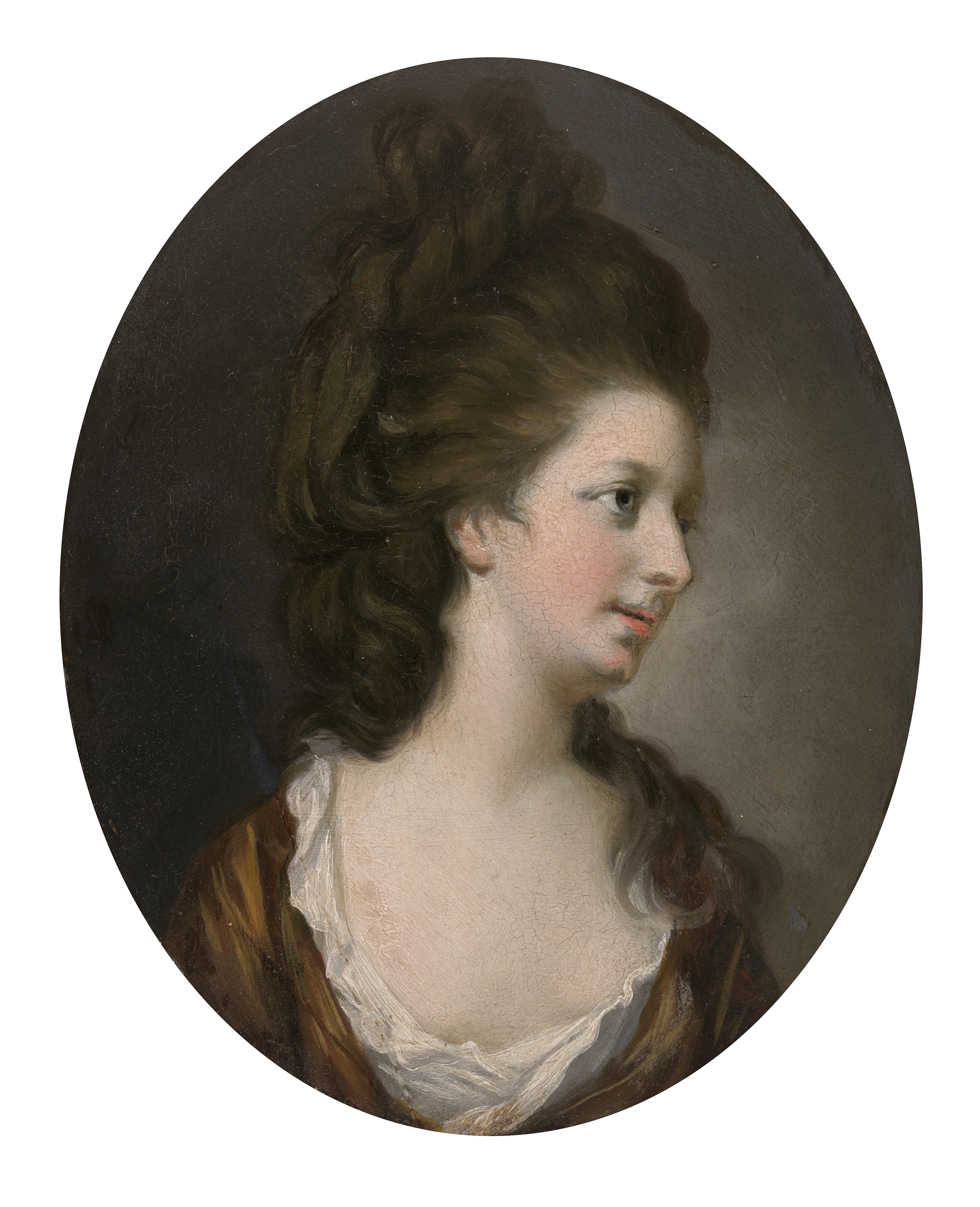
Barbara Montgomery (?1757-1788), second wife. Portrait by Hugh Douglas Hamilton.

== Notes ==
Parliament of Ireland
Preceded by George Beresford, Lord La Poer; James May	Member of Parliament for County Waterford; 1761–1801; With: James May 1761–1798; Richard Power 1798–1801	Succeeded by Parliament of the United Kingdom
Parliament of the United Kingdom
New constituency	Member of Parliament for County Waterford; 1801–1805; With: Richard Power 1801–1802; Edward Lee 1802–1805	Succeeded by Edward Lee; John Claudius Beresford
