= The Lady of May =

Play by Philip Sidney

The Lady of May is a one-act play by the English Renaissance poet Sir Philip Sidney. The play, which draws upon the literary tradition of pastoral, is notable for its allegorical content relating to Queen Elizabeth I, for whom the first production was performed at the Earl of Leicester's country estate at Wanstead. Queen Elizabeth was asked to mediate the outcome of the masque itself.

== Plot summary ==
A woman approaches the queen whilst walking in Wanstead Garden as a supplicant, saying that her daughter - the Lady of May - has two suitors, and that she would like the queen to judge which of the two should win her hand. Having left, a crowd of people come into view. There are six foresters and six shepherds (among them the suitors), the Lady of May herself, and a schoolmaster called Rombus. After a brief quarrel between Rombus and the May Lady, the two suitors, Therion and Espilus, begin a singing competition. With this finished a second debate starts between Rixus, a forester (like Therion) and Dorcas, a shepherd (like Espilus). This is moderated by Rombus. The Queen judges Espilus to have won the contest and Espilus sings to celebrate. Finally, the characters take their leave of the queen and the play ends.

== Allegorical Content ==
The critic Helen Cooper has suggested that the figures of Therion and Espilus relate to two real life suitors of Queen Elizabeth, the Earl of Leicester and Sir Christopher Hatton respectively. The etymologies of the names are used as evidence of this claim: Therion comes from the Greek meaning 'wild beast', which relates to Leicester's badge of a bear, and Espilus comes from the Greek meaning 'felt presser', which is a description of a hatter (from which occupation the surname of Hatton originates). Sidney's recommendation of Hatton for Elizabeth's hand would have been particularly edgy given that Wanstead, where the play is both set and presented, was owned by Leicester, who would presumably have been present at the performance.

Other interpretations of the allegory see the contest as relating to the French Catholic Prince Alençon.

== Publication history ==
This masque was first published (though without a title) in Sidney's 1598 folio of the Arcadia.
