= Musgrave baronets of Tourin (1782) =

Baronetcy in Ireland

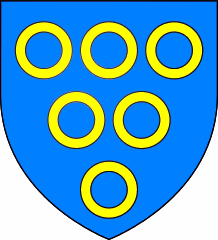
Escutcheon of the Musgrave baronets of Tourin

The Musgrave baronetcy, of Tourin in the County of Waterford, was created in the Baronetage of Ireland on 2 December 1782 for Richard Musgrave, Member of the Irish House of Commons for Lismore. There was a special remainder in default of male issue of his own to his younger brothers and the heirs male of the body. On his death in 1818 he was succeeded according to the special remainder by his younger brother, the 2nd Baronet.

The 3rd Baronet sat as Member of Parliament for County Waterford in the 1830s. The 4th Baronet served as Lord-Lieutenant of County Waterford from 1851.

The family seat was Tourin House, near Cappoquin, County Waterford. It was inherited by Joan Jameson.

== Musgrave baronets, of Tourin (1782) ==
- Sir Richard Musgrave, 1st Baronet, of Tourin (1746–1818)
- Sir Christopher Frederick Musgrave, 2nd Baronet (1738–1826)
- Sir Richard Musgrave, 3rd Baronet (1790–1859)
- Sir Richard Musgrave, 4th Baronet (1820–1874)
- Sir Richard John Musgrave, 5th Baronet (1850–1930)
- Sir Christopher Norman Musgrave, 6th Baronet (1892–1956)
- Sir Richard James Musgrave, 7th Baronet (1922–2000)
- Sir Christopher John Shane Musgrave, 8th Baronet (born 1959)

The heir presumptive is the present holder's only brother Michael Shane Musgrave (born 1968), whose heir is his son Mateo Rodriguez Larreta Musgrave (born 2009).
