= Sir Richard Osborne, 1st Baronet =

Irish lawyer and politician

Sir Richard Osborne, 1st Baronet (1593–1666/67) was an Irish baronet, lawyer and politician.

== Biography ==
Osborne served as Clerk of the King's Court of Ireland between 1616 and 1629 before being created a baronet in the Baronetage of Ireland of Ballintaylor and Ballylemon, County Waterford, on 15 October 1629.

He sat as a Member of Parliament for County Waterford being returned to the Irish House of Commons between 1639 and 1649, and between 1661 and 1666.

== Marriage and issue ==
Osborne and his wife Mary, daughter of Roger Dalton, of Knockmahon, County Waterford, had the following surviving sons:

- Sir Richard Osborne, 2nd Baronet (1618 - 2 March 1685)
- Nicholas Osborne, of Cappagh, County Tyrone (1620 - 1695), Clerk of the Crown of Ireland, married Anne Parsons, and had two sons and one daughter:
  - Sir Thomas Osborne, 5th Baronet (c. 1639 - 10 October 1715)
  - Grace Osborne, married firstly in 1656 John Stoute, of Youghal, County Cork, without issue, married secondly Piers Power, of Knockanore, County Waterford, without issue, and married thirdly Philip Fitzjames Ronayne, of Ronayne's Court, County Cork and had female issue
- John Osborne (c. 1622 - 1667), educated at Trinity College Dublin
- Roger Osborne (c. 1623 - 17 February 1679), educated at TCD, married Mabel, Lady Tynte (née Smyth)

== Coat of arms ==
Coat of arms of Sir Richard Osborne, 1st Baronet

Notes
By grant of the College of Arms
Adopted
1629
Crest
A Sealion sejant Proper holding in the dexter paw a Trident Sable headed Or
Helm
That of a baronet
Escutcheon
Gules on a Fess Or cotised Argent two Fountains Proper over all a Bend of the Second
Motto
Pax In Bello (Eng: Peace in war)
Other elements
The mark of a baronet for distinction

== Sources ==
- Charles Mosley, editor, Burke's Peerage, Baronetage & Knightage, 107th edition, 3 volumes (Wilmington, Delaware, U.S.A.: Burke's Peerage (Genealogical Books) Ltd, 2003), volume 2, pages 3030 and 3031.
- Hugh Montgomery-Massingberd, editor, Burke's Irish Family Records (London, U.K.: Burkes Peerage Ltd, 1976), page 429.

Parliament of Ireland
Vacant	Member of Parliament for County Waterford; 1639–1649; With: John Power	Vacant
Vacant	Member of Parliament for County Waterford; 1661–1666; With: Richard Power	Vacant
Baronetage of Ireland
New creation	Baronet (of Ballentaylor and Ballylemon); 1629 1667	Succeeded by Richard Osborne
