= Richard Osborne (politician) =

American politician

Member of the New Hampshire House of Representatives
- In office December 2, 2018 – December 2, 2020
- Succeeded by: Mark Alliegro
- Constituency: Grafton 7

Personal details
- Party: Democratic

Richard G. Osborne is an American politician from New Hampshire. He served in the New Hampshire House of Representatives from 2018 to 2020 as a member of the Democratic Party.

Osborne represented the Grafton 7 district, which covers a large part of the eastern section of Grafton County, New Hampshire. He was narrowly defeated in the 2020 New Hampshire House of Representatives election by Republican Mark Alliegro.
