= George May, 1st Baron May =

British financial expert and public servant (1871–1946)

The Right Honourable The Lord May Bt KBE
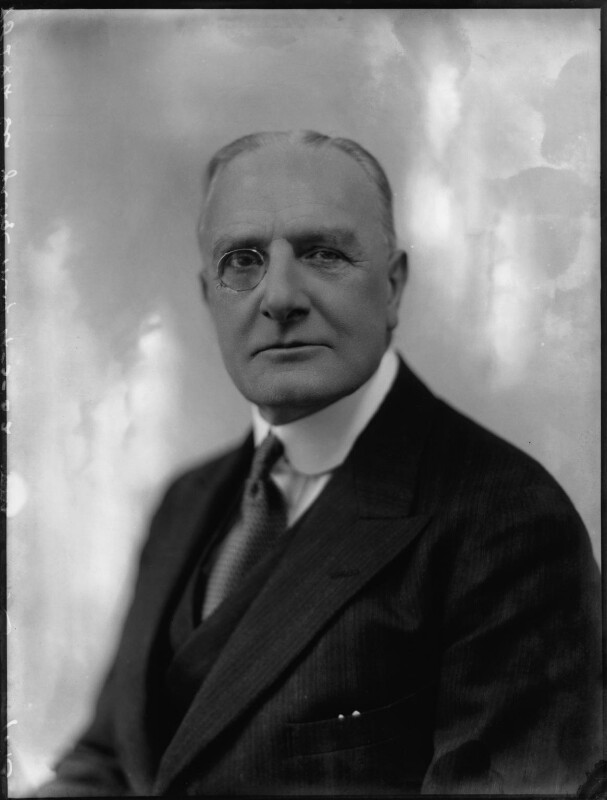
- May in 1932

Member of the House of Lords Lord Temporal
- In office 28 June 1935; Hereditary Peerage – 10 April 1946
- Preceded by: new creation
- Succeeded by: John Lawrence May, 2nd Baron May, 2nd Baronet

Personal details
- Born: 20 June 1871
- Died: 10 April 1946 (aged 74)
- Spouse: Lily Julia Strauss OBE (m. 1903)
- Children: John Lawrence May, 2nd Baron May, 2nd Baronet; The Hon. Elizabeth Frances May; The Hon. Patrick W. May
- Parents: William May; Julia Ann Mole
- Education: Cranleigh School
- Title: Baron May
- Tenure: 28 June 1935 – 10 April 1946
- Predecessor: new creation
- Successor: John Lawrence May, 2nd Baron May, 2nd Baronet

George Ernest May, 1st Baron May KBE (20 June 1871 – 10 April 1946) was a British financial expert and public servant.

== Early life and career ==
May was the younger son of William May, a grocer and wine merchant, of Cheshunt, Hertfordshire, and his wife Julia Ann Mole. He was educated at Cranleigh School. At the age of 16, he joined the Prudential Assurance Company as a clerk. He was to remain with this firm until his retirement in 1931, serving as the Company Secretary from 1915 until 1931. By 1931, May was blind in one eye and had a cataract in the other.

=== Financial expert ===
May quickly made his mark as a financial expert. During the First World War, he was Manager of the American Dollars Securities Committee from 1915 to 1918. This committee was set up by the government to oversee the collection of securities held by British firms in the United States, and to make them available to the British government in aid of the war effort.

=== Committee on National Expenditure ===
In 1931, after retiring as Secretary of the Prudential Assurance Company, he was appointed by the Chancellor of the Exchequer Philip Snowden to oversee a committee on national expenditure. The majority report found that there was a prospective deficit of £120 million, and recommended savings of £96,578,000 for the next financial year, of which £66.6 million were to come from reductions in Unemployment Insurance and £13.6 million from cuts in education. The chairman and the members suggested by the Conservative and Liberal parties supported the recommendations. Two members from the Labour Party submitted a minority report fundamentally disagreeing with the committee's recommendations. After a run on the pound sterling raised the deficit to grow to £170 million in August 1931, Prime Minister Ramsay MacDonald decided to implement the report's recommendations for budget cuts despite opposition from the rest of the Labour Party, leading to the collapse of his government and the formation of a new National Government led by MacDonald's breakaway National Labour Organisation alongside Conservatives and Liberals.

=== Oversees reorganisation of iron and steel industry ===
In early 1932, May was appointed Chairman of the Import Duties Advisory Committee by the new Chancellor, Neville Chamberlain. The committee oversaw the introduction and implementation of a general tariff over the next three years. As one of three members on the committee (along with Sir Sydney Chapman and Sir Allan Powell), May was specifically responsible for overseeing the reorganisation of the British iron and steel industry. The committee's activities were largely suspended after the outbreak of the Second World War, but May remained chairman until 1941.

== Personal life ==
=== Marriage ===
On 15 October 1903, George May married Lily Julia Strauss OBE (b. 1887; d. 15 Jan 1955), the second daughter of Gustave Strauss, a wealthy Bohemian glass merchant of 2 West Bolton Gardens, Kensington, London. The marriage took place in the Theistic Church in Swallow Street, Piccadilly, London, and was officiated by Charles Voysey, a freethinking Yorkshire vicar who was deposed for publishing heretical sermons and for denying the doctrine of everlasting hell. Lily's elder sister and suffragist, Florence Annie Strauss, had married MP and barrister-at-law Charles Augustus Vansittart Conybeare in the same church seven years earlier.

==== Issue ====
George and Lily May had three children:

- John Lawrence May, 2nd Baron May, 2nd Baronet
- The Hon. Elizabeth Frances May
- The Hon. Patrick W. May

=== Honours ===
For his services, May was made a KBE in the 1918 New Year Honours and was created a baronet, of The Eyot in the Baronetage of the United Kingdom, on 27 January 1931. May was further honoured in the 1935 Birthday Honours when he was raised to the peerage becoming Baron May, of Weybridge in the County of Surrey.

Peerage of the United Kingdom
New creation	Baron May; 1935–1946	Succeeded by John Lawrence May
Baronetage of the United Kingdom
New creation	Baronet (of the Eyot); 1931–1946	Succeeded by John Lawrence May
