= Beverley Ussher (MP) =

Irish Member of Parliament

Beverley Ussher (c. 1700 – September 1757) was an Irish Member of Parliament.

== Biography ==
He was the son of Beverley Ussher of Kilmeadan in County Waterford. He was High Sheriff of County Waterford in 1733 and then represented the county in the Irish House of Commons from 1735 until his death. He also served as Mayor of Waterford in 1744. Two of his daughters married MPs: Mary married John Congreve in 1758 and Elizabeth married Henry Alcock in 1766.
