= Baron May =

Barony in the Peerage of the United Kingdom

Baron May, of Weybridge in the County of Surrey, is a title in the Peerage of the United Kingdom. It was created on 28 June 1935 for the financial expert Sir George May, 1st Baronet. He was for many years secretary of the Prudential Assurance Company. May had already been created a Baronet, of the Eyot, in the Parish of Weybridge in the County of Surrey on 27 January 1931, in the Baronetage of the United Kingdom. Since 2006, the titles are held by his great-grandson.

== May Baronets (1931) ==
- Sir George Ernest May, 1st Baronet (1871–1946), created Baron May in 1935

== Barons May (1935) ==
- George Ernest May, 1st Baron May, 1st Baronet (1871–1946)
- John Lawrence May, 2nd Baron May, 2nd Baronet (1904–1950)
- Michael St John May, 3rd Baron May, 3rd Baronet (1931–2006)
- Jasper Bertram St John May, 4th Baron May, 4th Baronet (b. 1965)

There is no heir to the barony.

Coat of arms of Baron May
Crest A Demi-Leopard proper holding in the dexter paw a Bezant and resting the sinister paw on a Terrestrial Globe also proper Escutcheon Gules on a Chevron between in chief three Billets Or and in base an Eagle Argent three Roses of the field barbed and seeded proper Supporters Dexter: a Griffin; Sinister: a Dragon Or, each charged on the shoulder with a Sprig of Mayflower slipped and leaved proper Motto Deo Adjuvante Labor Proficit (With God's help work prospers)
