= Sir Richard Osborne, 2nd Baronet =

Irish politician

Sir Richard Osborne, 2nd Baronet, MP (1618 – 2 March 1685) was an Irish baronet and politician.

== Biography ==
Osborne was admitted to Gray's Inn in 1628 and sat as a Member of Parliament for Dungarvan in the Irish House of Commons between 1639 and 1649.

The eldest surviving son of Sir Richard Osborne and his wife Mary, daughter of Roger Dalton, of Knockmahon, he succeeded his father in the baronetcy in 1667 and served as High Sheriff of County Waterford for 1671–72.

== Marriage and issue ==
Sir Richard Osborne and Elizabeth née Carew had two sons and three daughters:

- Sir John Osborne, 3rd Baronet (1659 – 4 April 1713), succeeded in the baronetcy on 2 March 1685, married in 1699 Elizabeth Walsingham (died 22 February 1733), daughter of Colonel Thomas Walsingham, of Scadbury, Kent and wife Lady Anne Howard, without issue. He is buried in the nave of the Parish Church of St Mary The Virgin, Saffron Walden.
- Sir Richard Osborne, 4th Baronet (c. 1662 – October 1713), succeeded in the baronetcy on 4 April 1713, unmarried without issue
- Grace Osborne, married as his second wife Lieutenant-Colonel Beverley Ussher, of Ballyfin, County Cork (died 1683), 5th son of Arthur Ussher MP, of Donnybrook, County Dublin and wife Judith daughter of Sir Robert Newcomen, and had issue: including John Ussher MP and the Dukes of Leinster
- Elizabeth Osborne, married the Very Rev Arthur Pomeroy (1623 – 1708), and had issue: including Arthur Pomeroy, 1st Viscount Harberton
- Anne Osborne, married in 1678 Captain Charles Odell, of Castletown, County Limerick

== See also ==
- Burke's Peerage & Baronetage
- Parliament of Ireland

Parliament of Ireland
Vacant	Member of Parliament for Dungarvan; 1639–1649; With: Unknown	Vacant
Baronetage of Ireland
Preceded by Sir Richard Osborne	Baronet (of Ballentaylor and Ballylemon) bef. 1667 – 1685	Succeeded by Sir John Osborne
