= Osborne baronets =

Set index for Shelley baronets

There have been three baronetcies created for persons with the surname Osborne, two in the Baronetage of England and one in the Baronetage of Ireland. Two creations are extant.

- Osborne baronets of Kiveton (1620): see Duke of Leeds
- Osborne, later Osborn baronets, of Chicksands (1662): see Osborn baronets
- Osborne baronets of Ballintaylor and Ballylemon (1629)
