= Richard Keane (disambiguation) =

Richard Keane was an Australian politician.

Richard Keane may also refer to:

- Richard J. Keane (1933-2008), politician from Buffalo, New York
- Sir Richard Keane, 2nd Baronet (1780–1855) of the Keane baronets, MP for County Waterford
- Sir Richard Francis Keane, 4th Baronet (1845–1892) of the Keane baronets
- Sir Richard Michael Keane, 6th Baronet (1909–2010) of the Keane baronets

== See also ==
- Richard Keen, Baron Keen of Elie (born 1954), Scottish lawyer and politician
- Richard Keene (disambiguation)
