= Clodagh =

Clodagh (/ˈkloʊdə/ KLOH-də) is a female given name of Irish origin. Lady Clodagh Anson, daughter of John Beresford, 5th Marquess of Waterford, was named after the River Clodiagh, which flows through the Marquess's estate at Curraghmore at County Waterford. Lady Clodagh married Claud Anson, son of Thomas Anson, 2nd Earl of Lichfield, and had a daughter who later wrote, "She called me Clodagh too and hoped, in vain, that we'd be the only two." The name Clodagh is popular in Ireland but is little used elsewhere.

== People named Clodagh ==
- Lady Clodagh Anson, Anglo-Irish philanthropist, writer and aristocrat
- Clodagh Hope Knox Sparrow (1905–1957), British poster artist
- Clodagh Jayasuriya, Ceylonese politician
- Clodagh McKenna, Irish chef
- Clodagh O'Shea, Irish biologist
- Clodagh Rodgers (1947–2025), Northern Irish singer
- Clodagh Simonds, Irish singer

== Fictional characters ==
- Countess Clodagh, the fiancé of the narrator in The Purple Cloud, a 1901 novel by M. P. Shiel.
- Clodagh Asshlin, the heroine of The Gambler, a 1905 novel by Katherine Cecil Thurston.
- Sister Clodagh, a main character in the 1939 novel Black Narcissus, played by Deborah Kerr in the 1947 film adaptation.
- Clodagh Pine, character in Maeve Binchy's Circle of Friends (novel).
- Clodagh Piper, mother of the heroine of the 1994 novel An Imaginative Experience by Mary Wesley.
- Clodagh, protagonist of Grasshopper, a 2000 novel by Barbara Vine.
- Dr. Clodagh Delaney, in the RTÉ series The Clinic, played by Leigh Arnold.
- Clodagh, protagonist of Heir to Sevenwaters, a fantasy novel set in medieval Ireland.

== Other uses ==
- Storm Clodagh, a windstorm in north-western Europe in November 2015
- Clodagh Standing Stones, in County Cork, Ireland
- Clodagh Eastern Colony, Sri Lanka
- River Clodagh, a main tributary of the River Ilen in County Cork, Ireland

== See also ==
- List of Irish-language given names
