= 1873 County Waterford by-election =

UK Parliamentary by-election

A 1873 by-election to the constituency of County Waterford was fought on 5 July 1873. It was held due to the resignation of the incumbent Liberal MP, Edmond de la Poer. It was won by the unopposed Liberal candidate Henry Villiers-Stuart.
