= John Matthew Galwey =

Irish politician (c.1787 – 1842)

John Matthew Galwey (1787 or 1788 – 25 March 1842) was an Irish politician.

Galwey lived at Duckspool in County Waterford. He managed the estates of Lord Donoughmore and Lord Cremorne.

Galwey stood in the 1832 UK general election as an Irish Repeal candidate in both Dungarvan and in County Waterford. He narrowly lost the first, but won a seat in the second, as an Irish Repeal candidate. At the 1835 UK general election, he only contested Dungarvan, where he was defeated by a larger margin. He was again unsuccessful there in 1835 and 1837 by-elections, and at the 1837 UK general election.

Parliament of the United Kingdom
Preceded by Richard Musgrave; Robert Power	Member of Parliament for County Waterford; 1832 – 1835; With: Richard Keane	Succeeded by Richard Musgrave; Patrick Power
