= Gaillimh inion Breasail =

Irish river goddess

Gaillimh inion Breasail is the name of the mythical woman from whom the river and city of Galway, Ireland, derives its name.

According to James Hardiman, quoting Lughaidh Ó Cléirigh, "that the city of Galway took its name from the river, in which was drowned Gaillimh, the daughter of Breasail." Hardiman goes on to state that in the mid-17th map of the town, "a rock is shown in the river" (now called the Corrib), "where" it is stated, that "a woman, named Galva, was drowned, near a great rock, in the river," (which is delineated on the map) "and that from this circumstance the town originally took its name."

She was said to be the daughter of a chief of the Fir Bolg, Breasail. It is now generally held that she was a tribal or local goddess of the river, much like other Gaelic deities such as Boann. The etymology of the name is thought to translate, roughly, as stony river, and probably dates back to at least the late Irish pre-historic era.

== See also ==
- Boann
- Brasil (mythical island)
- Clodagh
- Danu
