= William Villiers-Stuart =

British soldier and politician

Member of Parliament for County Waterford
- In office 1835–1847 Serving with Sir Richard Musgrave, Bt (1835–1837); John Power (1837–1840); Hon. Robert Carew (1840–1847)

Personal details
- Born: William Stuart; 21 August 1804
- Died: 7 November 1873 (aged 69)
- Spouse: Catherine Cox (m. 1833)
- Relatives: Henry Villiers-Stuart (brother); George Mason-Villiers (grandfather); John Stuart (grandfather)

Captain William Villiers-Stuart (21 August 1804 – 7 November 1873), was a British soldier and Member of Parliament.

== Biography ==
Born William Stuart, he was the second son of Lord Henry Stuart, third son of John Stuart, 1st Marquess of Bute of County Kilkenny, Ireland. His mother was Lady Gertrude Amelia, only child and heiress of George Mason-Villiers, 2nd Earl Grandison, while Lord Stuart de Decies was his elder brother. In 1822 he assumed by Royal licence the additional surname of Villiers.

Villiers-Stuart was a captain in the 12th Lancers. In 1835 he was returned to parliament as one of two representatives for County Waterford, a seat he held until 1847. He was appointed High Sheriff of County Kilkenny for 1848–49.

Villiers-Stuart married Catherine, daughter of Michael Cox of Castletown Cox, in 1833. They had several children. He died in November 1873, aged 69. His wife survived him by six years and died in September 1879.

Parliament of the United Kingdom
Preceded by Sir Richard Musgrave, Bt; Patrick Power	Member of Parliament for County Waterford; 1835–1847; With: Sir Richard Musgrave, Bt 1835–1837; John Power 1837–1840; Hon. Robert Carew 1840–1847	Succeeded by Nicholas Mahon Power; Robert Keating
