= Dungarvan (UK Parliament constituency) =

UK parliamentary constituency in Ireland, 1801–1885

- Former borough constituency for the House of Commons
- County: County Waterford
- Borough: Dungarvan

1801–1885
- Seats: 1
- Created from: Dungarvan
- Replaced by: West Waterford

Dungarvan was a parliamentary constituency in Ireland, which from 1801 to 1885 returned one Member of Parliament (MP) to the House of Commons of the Parliament of the United Kingdom.

== History ==
The constituency was created when the Union of the Kingdom of Great Britain and the Kingdom of Ireland took effect on 1 January 1801, replacing the earlier Dungarvan constituency in the Irish House of Commons.

It was disfranchised under the Redistribution of Seats Act 1885, which took effect at the 1885 general election.

== Boundaries ==
This constituency was the parliamentary borough of Dungarvan in County Waterford. Until the Parliamentary Boundaries (Ireland) Act 1832 (passed alongside the Representation of the People (Ireland) Act 1832) it was coterminous with the manor of Dungarvan, and the franchise was exercised by potwallopers of the town and forty-shilling freeholders of the manor. The manor extended far beyond the urban area, including Abbeyside on the east bank of the Colligan River. Commissioners appointed in 1831 to revise Irish parliamentary boundaries described "Manor as shown upon our plan contains about 10,000 statute acres, and about 11,858 inhabitants, but the limits of it are very imperfectly known". Besides the main portion around the town, the borough included three detached townlands further west (Knockampoor, Canty, and Ballymullala) and excluded 15 small enclaves (one within Dungarvan town, one to the west, and thirteen on the east bank of the Colligan, of which nine belonged to the manor of Dromana, including the townlands of Tournore, Clonanagh and Croughtanaul). The 1832 commissioners suggested radical simplification in the boundary, "in the event of a boundary being required to separate the Town of Dungarvan from the Manor". However, the only change in 1832 was to exclude the detached parts and include the enclosed enclaves to create a single area. It was defined by the Parliamentary Boundaries (Ireland) Act 1832 as:

The present Borough or Manor of Dungarvan, with the Exception of such Parts of the same as lie entirely detached from the rest; also, in addition to the present Manor, all those Portions of Land, which, though not belonging to the same, are locally situate within it, or entirely surrounded by the Lands of the Manor.

This boundary is marked on the Ordnance Survey of Ireland's six-inch map, published a few years later. Commissioners appointed in 1836 to revise Irish municipal borough boundaries similarly described the limits of the borough as "ill defined".

== Members of Parliament ==
| Election | Member | Party |
|---|---|---|
| 1801 | Edward Lee | Whig |
| 1802 | William Greene | Whig |
| 1806 | Hon. George Walpole | Whig |
| 1820 | Augustus Clifford | Whig |
| 1822 | Hon. George Lamb | Whig |
| 1834 | Ebenezer Jacob | Radical |
| 1835 | Michael O'Loghlen | Whig |
| Feb. 1837 | John Power | Whig |
| Aug. 1837 | Cornelius O'Callaghan | Whig |
| 1841 | Richard Lalor Sheil | Radical |
| 1851 | Charles Ponsonby, later Baron de Mauley | Whig |
| 1852 | John Maguire | Ind. Irish |
| 1859 | John Maguire | Liberal |
| 1865 | Charles Robert Barry | Liberal |
| 1868 | Henry Matthews | Liberal |
| 1874 | John O'Keeffe | Home Rule |
| 1877 | Frank Hugh O'Donnell | Home Rule |

== Elections ==
=== Elections in the 1830s ===
General election 1830: Dungarvan
| Party | Candidate | Votes | % |
|---|---|---|---|
| Whig | George Lamb | 370 | 88.1 |
| Repeal | Dominick Ronayne | 50 | 11.9 |
| Majority | | 320 | 76.2 |
| Turnout | | 420 | c. 48.2 |
| Registered electors | | c. 871 | |
| Whig hold | | | |

General election 1831: Dungarvan
| Party | Candidate | Votes | % |
|---|---|---|---|
| Whig | George Lamb | Unopposed | |
| Registered electors | | c. 871 | |
| Whig hold | | | |

General election 1832: Dungarvan
| Party | Candidate | Votes | % |
|---|---|---|---|
| Whig | George Lamb | 307 | 53.2 |
| Repeal | John Matthew Galwey | 270 | 46.8 |
| Majority | | 37 | 6.4 |
| Turnout | | 577 | 85.2 |
| Registered electors | | 677 | |
| Whig hold | | | |

Lamb's death caused a by-election.

By-election, 15 February 1834: Dungarvan
| Party | Candidate | Votes | % | ±% |
|---|---|---|---|---|
| Radical | Ebenezer Jacob | 307 | 53.6 | N/A |
| Whig | Pierce George Barron | 260 | 45.4 | N/A |
| Whig | Philip Cecil Crampton | 6 | 1.0 | N/A |
| Majority | | 47 | 8.2 | N/A |
| Turnout | | 573 | c. 84.6 | c. −0.6 |
| Registered electors | | c. 677 | | |
| Radical gain from Whig | | Swing | | |

Jacob was unseated on petition, causing a further by-election.

By-election, 16 May 1834: Dungarvan
| Party | Candidate | Votes | % | ±% |
|---|---|---|---|---|
| Radical | Ebenezer Jacob | 293 | 52.1 | N/A |
| Whig | Pierce George Barron | 269 | 47.9 | −5.3 |
| Majority | | 24 | 4.2 | N/A |
| Turnout | | 562 | c. 83.0 | c. −2.2 |
| Registered electors | | 677 | | |
| Radical hold | | Swing | | |

General election 1835: Dungarvan
| Party | Candidate | Votes | % |
|---|---|---|---|
| Whig | Michael O'Loghlen | Unopposed | |
| Registered electors | | 707 | |
| Whig hold | | | |

O'Loghlen was appointed as Solicitor-General for Ireland, causing a by-election.

By-election, 4 May 1835: Dungarvan
| Party | Candidate | Votes | % |
|---|---|---|---|
| Whig | Michael O'Loghlen | 360 | 80.4 |
| Repeal | John Matthew Galwey | 88 | 19.6 |
| Majority | | 272 | 60.8 |
| Turnout | | 448 | 63.3 |
| Registered electors | | 708 | |
| Whig hold | | | |

O'Loghlen was appointed as Attorney-General for Ireland, causing a by-election.

By-election, 21 September 1835: Dungarvan
| Party | Candidate | Votes | % |
|---|---|---|---|
| Whig | Michael O'Loghlen | 315 | 67.3 |
| Repeal | John Matthew Galwey | 153 | 32.7 |
| Majority | | 162 | 34.6 |
| Turnout | | 468 | 65.6 |
| Registered electors | | 713 | |
| Whig hold | | | |

O'Loghlen was appointed Baron of the Irish Court of Exchequer and resigned, causing a by-election.

By-election, 16 February 1837: Dungarvan
| Party | Candidate | Votes | % |
|---|---|---|---|
| Whig | John Power | 283 | 63.3 |
| Repeal | John Matthew Galwey | 164 | 36.7 |
| Majority | | 119 | 26.6 |
| Turnout | | 447 | 60.3 |
| Registered electors | | 741 | |
| Whig hold | | | |

General election 1837: Dungarvan
| Party | Candidate | Votes | % |
|---|---|---|---|
| Whig | Cornelius O'Callaghan | 261 | 62.4 |
| Repeal (Whig) | John Matthew Galwey | 157 | 37.6 |
| Majority | | 104 | 24.8 |
| Turnout | | 418 | 56.0 |
| Registered electors | | 747 | |
| Whig hold | | | |

=== Elections in the 1840s ===
General election 1841: Dungarvan
| Party | Candidate | Votes | % | ±% |
|---|---|---|---|---|
| Radical | Richard Lalor Sheil | Unopposed | | |
| Registered electors | | 434 | | |
| Radical gain from Whig | | | | |

Sheil was appointed as Master of the Mint, requiring a by-election.

By-election, 10 July 1846: Dungarvan
| Party | Candidate | Votes | % | ±% |
|---|---|---|---|---|
| Radical | Richard Lalor Sheil | Unopposed | | |
| Radical hold | | | | |

General election 1847: Dungarvan
| Party | Candidate | Votes | % | ±% |
|---|---|---|---|---|
| Radical | Richard Lalor Sheil | 151 | 52.8 | N/A |
| Repeal | John Maguire | 135 | 47.2 | New |
| Majority | | 16 | 5.6 | N/A |
| Turnout | | 286 | 50.6 | N/A |
| Registered electors | | 565 | | |
| Radical hold | | Swing | N/A | |

=== Elections in the 1850s ===
Due to both ill health and to become a diplomat in Tuscany, Sheil resigned by accepting the office of Steward of the Chiltern Hundreds, causing a by-election.

By-election, 22 March 1851: Dungarvan
| Party | Candidate | Votes | % | ±% |
|---|---|---|---|---|
| Whig | Charles Ponsonby | 158 | 65.6 | N/A |
| Radical | John Maguire | 83 | 34.4 | −12.8 |
| Majority | | 75 | 31.2 | N/A |
| Turnout | | 241 | 76.8 | +26.2 |
| Registered electors | | 314 | | |
| Whig gain from Radical | | Swing | | |

General election 1852: Dungarvan
| Party | Candidate | Votes | % | ±% |
|---|---|---|---|---|
| Independent Irish | John Maguire | 127 | 52.3 | +5.1 |
| Whig | Edmund O'Flaherty | 116 | 47.7 | N/A |
| Majority | | 11 | 4.6 | N/A |
| Turnout | | 243 | 77.4 | +26.8 |
| Registered electors | | 314 | | |
| Independent Irish gain from Radical | | Swing | | |

In order to enable the withdrawal of an election petition filed by O'Flaherty, Maguire resigned by accepting the office of Steward of the Chiltern Hundreds, causing a by-election.

By-election, 26 August 1853: Dungarvan
| Party | Candidate | Votes | % | ±% |
|---|---|---|---|---|
| Independent Irish | John Maguire | 150 | 65.8 | +13.5 |
| Conservative | William Henry Gregory | 78 | 34.2 | New |
| Majority | | 72 | 31.6 | +27.0 |
| Turnout | | 228 | 75.2 | −2.2 |
| Registered electors | | 303 | | |
| Independent Irish hold | | Swing | | |

General election 1857: Dungarvan
| Party | Candidate | Votes | % | ±% |
|---|---|---|---|---|
| Independent Irish | John Maguire | 123 | 54.2 | +1.9 |
| Conservative | Sir John Nugent Humble, 2nd Baronet | 104 | 45.8 | N/A |
| Majority | | 19 | 8.4 | +3.8 |
| Turnout | | 227 | 85.3 | +7.9 |
| Registered electors | | 266 | | |
| Independent Irish hold | | Swing | | |

General election 1859: Dungarvan
| Party | Candidate | Votes | % | ±% |
|---|---|---|---|---|
| Liberal | John Maguire | Unopposed | | |
| Registered electors | | 280 | | |
| Liberal gain from Independent Irish | | | | |

=== Elections in the 1860s ===
General election 1865: Dungarvan
| Party | Candidate | Votes | % | ±% |
|---|---|---|---|---|
| Liberal | Charles Robert Barry | 112 | 54.4 | N/A |
| Conservative | William Palliser | 94 | 45.6 | New |
| Majority | | 18 | 8.8 | N/A |
| Turnout | | 206 | 80.2 | N/A |
| Registered electors | | 257 | | |
| Liberal hold | | Swing | N/A | |

General election 1868: Dungarvan
| Party | Candidate | Votes | % | ±% |
|---|---|---|---|---|
| Liberal | Henry Matthews | 155 | 59.6 | N/A |
| Liberal | Charles Robert Barry | 105 | 40.4 | −14.0 |
| Majority | | 50 | 19.2 | N/A |
| Turnout | | 260 | 83.6 | +3.4 |
| Registered electors | | 311 | | |
| Liberal hold | | Swing | N/A | |

=== Elections in the 1870s ===
General election 1874: Dungarvan
| Party | Candidate | Votes | % | ±% |
|---|---|---|---|---|
| Home Rule | John O'Keefe | 131 | 53.3 | New |
| Liberal | Henry Matthews | 115 | 46.7 | −12.9 |
| Majority | | 16 | 6.6 | N/A |
| Turnout | | 246 | 85.4 | +1.8 |
| Registered electors | | 288 | | |
| Home Rule gain from Liberal | | Swing | N/A | |

O'Keefe's death caused a by-election.

By-election, 23 June 1877: Dungarvan
| Party | Candidate | Votes | % | ±% |
|---|---|---|---|---|
| Home Rule | Frank Hugh O'Donnell | 137 | 53.5 | +0.2 |
| Liberal | Henry Matthews | 119 | 46.5 | −0.2 |
| Majority | | 18 | 7.0 | +0.4 |
| Turnout | | 256 | 80.5 | −4.9 |
| Registered electors | | 318 | | |
| Home Rule hold | | Swing | +0.2 | |

=== Elections in the 1880s ===
General election 1880: Dungarvan
| Party | Candidate | Votes | % | ±% |
|---|---|---|---|---|
| Home Rule | Frank Hugh O'Donnell | 132 | 57.6 | +4.3 |
| Liberal | Henry Matthews | 97 | 42.4 | −4.3 |
| Majority | | 35 | 15.2 | +8.6 |
| Turnout | | 229 | 97.4 | +12.0 |
| Registered electors | | 235 | | |
| Home Rule hold | | Swing | +4.3 | |

== Sources ==
- The Parliaments of England by Henry Stooks Smith (1st edition published in three volumes 1844–50), 2nd edition edited (in one volume) by F.W.S. Craig (Political Reference Publications 1973)
- Walker, B.M., ed. (1978). Parliamentary Election Results in Ireland, 1801–1922. Dublin: Royal Irish Academy. ISBN 0901714127.
- Leigh Rayment's Historical List of MPs – Constituencies beginning with "D" (part 4)
