= Edmond de la Poer, 1st Count de la Poer =

Irish politician, died 1915

Edmond de la Poer

Member of Parliament for County Waterford
- In office 31 December 1866 – 10 February 1874 Serving with John Esmonde
- Preceded by: John Beresford; John Esmonde
- Succeeded by: Henry Villiers-Stuart; John Esmonde

Personal details
- Born: Edmond James Power; 6 March 1841
- Died: 30 August 1915 (aged 74) London, England
- Party: Liberal
- Spouse: Mary Olivia Augusta Monsell (m. 1881)
- Children: Six
- Parent(s): John William Power; Frances Power

Edmond James de Poher de la Poer, 1st Count de la Poer (6 March 1841 – 30 August 1915), known as Edmond James Power until 1863, and 18th Baron le Power and Coroghmore from 1851 to 1864, was an Irish Liberal politician.

== Family ==
De la Poer was born as Edmond James Power to John William Power and Frances (née Power), daughter of John Power. On 12 May 1851, he succeeded to the Irish peerage as 18th Baron le Power and Coroghmore of County Waterford.

In 1863, he commissioned the building of Castle Gurteen de la Poer, an Elizabethan Revival house in County Waterford, Ireland, replacing an earlier house on the estate. On 19 August 1864, he was made 1st Count de la Poer in the Papal States.

In 1881, he married Mary Olivia Augusta Monsell, daughter of Thomas William Gaston Monsell and Frances Vincent de la Poer, and they had at least six children: Edmond Alan Tremeur de Poher de la Poer-Monsell; John William Rivallon de Poher de la Poer (1882–1939); Elinor Mary Trifine de Poher de la Poer (1884–1973); William Stephen Arnold Trémeur de Poher de la Poer (1885–1936); Ermyngarde Berthe Frances de Poher de la Poer (1887–1967); and Mary Frances Yseult de Poher de la Poer (born 1889).

== Political career ==
De la Poer was elected MP as a Liberal candidate for County Waterford at a by-election in 1866—caused by the succession of John Beresford to 5th Marquess of Waterford—and held the seat until 1873 when he resigned.

He was also a Justice of the Peace for County Waterford, High Sheriff of County Waterford in 1879, Private Chamberlain to Pope Pius IX, and Lord Lieutenant of Waterford and City of Waterford in 1909. He was also a Knight of Malta.

Parliament of the United Kingdom
Preceded by John Beresford; John Esmonde	Member of Parliament for County Waterford; 1866 – 1873; With: John Esmonde	Succeeded by Henry Villiers-Stuart; John Esmonde
