= 1877 Dungarvan by-election =

UK Parliamentary by-election

The 1877 Dungarvan by-election was fought on 23 June 1877. The by-election was fought due to the death of the incumbent Home Rule MP, John O'Keeffe. It was won by the Home Rule candidate Frank Hugh O'Donnell.
