= County Waterford (UK Parliament constituency) =

UK parliamentary constituency in Ireland, 1801–1922

- Former county constituency for the House of Commons
- County Waterford within Ireland
- County: County Waterford

1801–1885
- Seats: 2
- Created from: County Waterford (IHC)
- Replaced by: East Waterford; West Waterford

1918–1922
- Seats: 1
- Created from: East Waterford; West Waterford
- Replaced by: Waterford–Tipperary East

County Waterford was a parliamentary constituency in Ireland, represented in the British House of Commons.

== Boundaries and boundary changes ==
This constituency comprised County Waterford, except for the parliamentary boroughs of Dungarvan (1801–1885) and Waterford City (1801–1885 and 1918–1922). It returned two Members of Parliament from 1801 to 1885 and one from 1918 to 1922.

It was an original constituency represented in Parliament when the Union of Great Britain and Ireland took effect on 1 January 1801.

Between 1885 and 1918 the area had been divided between the constituencies of East Waterford and West Waterford. From 1922 it was no longer represented in the House of Commons of the United Kingdom.

== Politics ==
In the 1918 election Sinn Féin defeated by 3 to 1 the Nationalist candidate J. J. O'Shee representing the Irish Parliamentary Party.

The newly elected Sinn Féin MP for the constituency was Cathal Brugha. Like other Sinn Féin MPs elected that year, he did not take his seat at Westminster but instead, took a seat in the revolutionary First Dáil which assembled in Dublin on 21 January 1919. As better known figures were under arrest, Brugha became the first presiding officer (with the title of Ceann Comhairle) and a day later the first head of government (with the title of President of Dáil Éireann), of the Irish Republic.

== First Dáil ==
Sinn Féin contested the 1918 general election on the platform that instead of taking up any seats they won in the United Kingdom Parliament, they would establish a revolutionary assembly in Dublin. In republican theory every MP elected in Ireland was a potential Deputy to this assembly. In practice only the Sinn Féin members accepted the offer.

The revolutionary First Dáil assembled on 21 January 1919 and last met on 10 May 1921. The First Dáil, according to a resolution passed on 10 May 1921, was formally dissolved on the assembling of the Second Dáil. This took place on 16 August 1921.

In 1921 Sinn Féin used the 1921 Northern Ireland and Southern Ireland general elections as a poll for the Irish Republic's Second Dáil. This area was part of the five-seat Dáil constituency of Waterford–Tipperary East.

== Members of Parliament ==
=== MPs 1801–1885 ===
Year	1st Member	1st Party	2nd Member	2nd Party
1801	Hon. John Beresford		Richard Power	Whig
21 Jul 1802	Hon. John Beresford		Edward Lee	Whig
6 Jan 1806	John Claudius Beresford	Tory	Edward Lee	Whig
18 Nov 1806	John Claudius Beresford	Tory	Richard Power	Whig
28 Jun 1811	Sir William Beresford	Tory	Richard Power	Whig
25 Apr 1814	Sir William Beresford	Tory	Richard Power	Whig/Catholic Association
25 May 1814	Lord George Beresford	Tory	Richard Power	Whig/Catholic Association
1 Jul 1826	Henry Villiers-Stuart	Whig	Richard Power	Whig/Catholic Association
2 Mar 1830	Lord George Beresford	Tory	Richard Power	Whig/Catholic Association
13 Aug 1830	Lord George Beresford	Tory	Daniel O'Connell	Repeal/Catholic Association
11 May 1831	Sir Richard Musgrave, Bt	Whig	Robert Power	Whig
26 Dec 1832	John Matthew Galwey	Repeal Association	Sir Richard Keane, Bt	Whig
19 Jan 1835	Sir Richard Musgrave, Bt	Repeal Association	Patrick Power	Whig
21 Sep 1835	Sir Richard Musgrave, Bt	Repeal Association	William Villiers-Stuart	Whig
9 Aug 1837	John Power	Whig	William Villiers-Stuart	Whig
24 Aug 1840	Hon. Robert Carew	Whig	William Villiers-Stuart	Whig
11 Aug 1847	Nicholas Mahon Power	Repeal	Robert Keating	Repeal
26 Jul 1852	Nicholas Mahon Power	Independent Irish	Sir John Esmonde, Bt	Independent Irish
2 Apr 1857	Nicholas Mahon Power	Radical	Sir John Esmonde, Bt	Whig
12 May 1859	Walter Talbot	Conservative	Sir John Esmonde, Bt	Liberal
18 Jul 1865	Earl of Tyrone	Conservative	Sir John Esmonde, Bt	Liberal
31 Dec 1866	Edmond de la Poer	Liberal	Sir John Esmonde, Bt	Liberal
5 Jul 1873	Henry Villiers-Stuart	Liberal	Sir John Esmonde, Bt	Liberal
10 Feb 1874	Lord Charles Beresford	Conservative	Sir John Esmonde, Bt	Home Rule League
24 Jan 1877	Lord Charles Beresford	Conservative	James Delahunty	Home Rule League
9 Apr 1880	Henry Villiers-Stuart	Liberal	John Aloysius Blake	Home Rule League
25 Aug 1884	Henry Villiers-Stuart	Liberal	Patrick Power	Irish Parliamentary Party
1885	Constituency divided: see East Waterford and West Waterford			

=== MPs 1918–1922 ===
Election	Member	Party
1918	Cathal Brugha	Sinn Féin
1922	Constituency abolished	

== Elections ==
The single-member elections in this constituency took place using the first past the post electoral system. Multi-member elections used the plurality-at-large voting system.

=== Elections in the 1830s ===
Villiers Stuart resigned, causing a by-election.

By-election, 2 March 1830: County Waterford
Party	Candidate	Votes	%	±%
Tory	George Beresford	461	59.2	
Whig	John Barron	318	40.8	
Majority		143	18.4	
Turnout		779	100.0	
Registered electors		779		
Tory gain from Whig		Swing		

General election 1830: County Waterford (2 seats)
Party	Candidate	Votes	%
Tory	George Beresford	Unopposed	
Repeal	Daniel O'Connell	Unopposed	
Registered electors		1,210	
Tory gain from Whig			
Repeal gain from Whig			

General election 1831: County Waterford (2 seats)
Party	Candidate	Votes	%
Whig	Richard Musgrave	Unopposed	
Whig	Robert Power (British politician)	Unopposed	
Registered electors		1,210	
Whig gain from Tory			
Whig gain from Repeal			

General election 1832: County Waterford (2 seats)
Party	Candidate	Votes	%
Repeal	John Matthew Galwey	443	41.1
Whig	Richard Keane	332	30.8
Whig	Robert Power (British politician)	303	28.1
Turnout		675	46.6
Registered electors		1,448	
Majority		140	13.0
Repeal gain from Whig			
Majority		29	2.7
Whig hold			

General election 1835: County Waterford (2 seats)
Party	Candidate	Votes	%
Repeal (Whig)	Richard Musgrave	Unopposed	
Whig	Patrick Power	Unopposed	
Registered electors		1,478	
Repeal hold			
Whig hold			

Power's death caused a by-election.

By-election, 21 September 1835: County Waterford
Party	Candidate	Votes	%
Whig	William Villiers-Stewart	Unopposed	
Whig hold			

General election 1837: County Waterford (2 seats)
Party	Candidate	Votes	%
Whig	William Villiers-Stuart	Unopposed	
Whig	John Power (Irish MP)	Unopposed	
Registered electors		1,563	
Whig hold			
Whig gain from Repeal			

=== Elections in the 1840s ===
Power resigned by accepting the office of Steward of the Chiltern Hundreds, causing a by-election.

By-election, 24 August 1840: County Waterford
Party	Candidate	Votes	%	±%
Whig	Robert Carew	Unopposed		
Whig hold				

General election 1841: County Waterford (2 seats)
Party	Candidate	Votes	%	±%
Whig	Robert Carew	Unopposed		
Whig	William Villiers-Stuart	Unopposed		
Registered electors		802		
Whig hold				
Whig hold				

General election 1847: County Waterford (2 seats)
Party	Candidate	Votes	%	±%
Repeal	Nicholas Mahon Power	Unopposed		
Repeal	Robert Keating	Unopposed		
Registered electors		872		
Repeal gain from Whig				
Repeal gain from Whig				

=== Elections in the 1850s ===
General election 1852: County Waterford (2 seats)
Party	Candidate	Votes	%	±%
Independent Irish	Nicholas Mahon Power	1,404	36.1	N/A
Independent Irish	John Esmonde	1,261	32.4	N/A
Conservative	Richard Hely-Hutchinson	1,228	31.5	New
Majority		33	0.9	N/A
Turnout		2,561 (est)	78.8 (est)	N/A
Registered electors		3,248		
Independent Irish gain from Repeal		Swing	N/A	
Independent Irish gain from Repeal		Swing	N/A	

General election 1857: County Waterford (2 seats)
Party	Candidate	Votes	%	±%
Radical	Nicholas Mahon Power	Unopposed		
Whig	John Esmonde	Unopposed		
Registered electors		3,293		
Radical gain from Independent Irish				
Whig gain from Independent Irish				

General election 1859: County Waterford (2 seats)
Party	Candidate	Votes	%	±%
Liberal	John Esmonde	Unopposed		
Conservative	Walter Talbot	Unopposed		
Registered electors		3,384		
Liberal hold				
Conservative gain from Liberal				

=== Elections in the 1860s ===
General election 1865: County Waterford (2 seats)
Party	Candidate	Votes	%	±%
Conservative	John Beresford	Unopposed		
Liberal	John Esmonde	Unopposed		
Registered electors		3,477		
Conservative hold				
Liberal hold				

Esmonde was appointed a Lord Commissioner of the Treasury, causing a by-election.

By-election, 7 June 1866: County Waterford
Party	Candidate	Votes	%	±%
Liberal	John Esmonde	Unopposed		
Registered electors		3,477		
Liberal hold				

Beresford succeeded as 5th Marquess of Waterford, causing a by-election.

By-election, 31 December 1866: County Waterford
Party	Candidate	Votes	%	±%
Liberal	Edmond de la Poer	1,481	60.1	N/A
Conservative	Walter Talbot	984	39.9	N/A
Majority		497	20.2	N/A
Turnout		2,465	70.9	N/A
Registered electors		3,477		
Liberal gain from Conservative				

General election 1868: County Waterford (2 seats)
Party	Candidate	Votes	%	±%
Liberal	Edmond de la Poer	Unopposed		
Liberal	John Esmonde	Unopposed		
Registered electors		3,445		
Liberal hold				
Liberal gain from Conservative				

=== Elections in the 1870s ===
de la Poer resigned, causing a by-election.

By-election, 5 Jul 1873: County Waterford (1 seat)
Party	Candidate	Votes	%	±%
Liberal	Henry Villiers-Stuart	Unopposed		
Registered electors		3,407		
Liberal hold				

General election 1874: County Waterford (2 seats)
Party	Candidate	Votes	%	±%
Conservative	Charles Beresford	1,767	49.0	New
Home Rule	John Esmonde	1,390	38.6	New
Home Rule	Abraham Pearson Longbottom	446	12.4	New
Majority		377	10.4	N/A
Turnout		3,157 (est)	95.2 (est)	N/A
Registered electors		3,317		
Conservative gain from Liberal		Swing	N/A	
Home Rule gain from Liberal		Swing	N/A	

Esmonde's death caused a by-election.

1877 County Waterford by-election (1 seat)
Party	Candidate	Votes	%	±%
Home Rule	James Delahunty	1,799	77.1	+26.1
Liberal	Frederick Lehmann	534	22.9	New
Majority		1,265	54.2	N/A
Turnout		2,333	71.2	−24.0
Registered electors		3,276		
Home Rule hold		Swing		

=== Elections in the 1880s ===
General election 1880: County Waterford (2 seats)
Party	Candidate	Votes	%	±%
Liberal	Henry Villiers-Stuart	1,751	41.2	N/A
Home Rule	John Aloysius Blake	1,625	38.3	−12.7
Conservative	Charles Beresford	870	20.5	−28.5
Turnout		2,558 (est)	81.6 (est)	−13.6
Registered electors		3,135		
Majority		881	20.7	N/A
Liberal gain from Conservative		Swing	N/A	
Majority		755	17.8	
Home Rule hold		Swing	+0.8	

Blake resigned, causing a by-election.

By-election, 21 Aug 1884: County Waterford
Party	Candidate	Votes	%	±%
Irish Parliamentary	Patrick Power	Unopposed		
Registered electors		3,060		
Irish Parliamentary hold				

=== Elections in the 1910s ===
General Election 14 December 1918: County Waterford
Party	Candidate	Votes	%	±%
Sinn Féin	Cathal Brugha	12,890	75.3	
Irish Parliamentary	J. J. O'Shee	4,217	24.7	
Majority		8,673	50.6	
Turnout		17,107	70.0	
Registered electors		24,439		
Sinn Féin win (new seat)				

== See also ==
- List of United Kingdom Parliament constituencies in Ireland and Northern Ireland
- Redistribution of Seats (Ireland) Act 1918
- List of MPs elected in the 1918 United Kingdom general election
- Historic Dáil constituencies
- Members of the 1st Dáil
