= Richard Keene (disambiguation) =

Richard Keene may refer to:

- Richard Keene (1825–1894), British photographer
- Richard Keene (politician) (born 1957), American politician

== See also ==
- Richard Keen, politician
- Richard Keen (racing driver)
- Richard Keane (disambiguation)
