= Nicholas Mahon Power =

Nicholas Mahon Power (1787 – 1873) was an Irish nationalist politician. He sat in the House of Commons of the United Kingdom from 1847 to 1859.

== Career ==
Nicholas Mahon Power was among the principal lessors in the parishes of Ballynakill and Faithlegg, barony of Gaultiere, County Waterford, at the time of Griffith's Valuation.

Standing as a Repeal Association candidate, he was elected in 1847 as one of the two Members of Parliament (MPs) for County Waterford. He was re-elected in 1852.

Power and his fellow Waterford MP John Esmonde were elected as candidates of the Irish Whig Party, which had been in alliance with nationalists. Power's brother, Patrick, had represented Waterford in 1835.

After the election, and Power and Esmonde were among the 40 Irish Whigs who joined the new Independent Irish Party. The new party did not survive, and Power was re-elected as a Whig in 1857. He did not contest the 1859 election, and retired from Parliament.

== Family ==
Nicholas Mahon Power and his wife, Margaret, had seven children. The family home was Faithlegg House, Cheekpoint, County Waterford.

Parliament of the United Kingdom
Preceded by Hon. Robert Carew; William Villiers-Stuart	Member of Parliament for County Waterford; 1847–1859; With: Robert Keating 1847–52; John Esmonde from 1852	Succeeded by John Esmonde; Walter Cecil Talbot
