= West Waterford =

Former parliamentary constituency in the United Kingdom

- Former county constituency for the House of Commons

1885–1918
- Seats: 1
- Created from: County Waterford and Dungarvan
- Replaced by: County Waterford

West Waterford was a UK Parliament constituency in Ireland, returning one Member of Parliament from 1885 to 1918.

Prior to the 1885 United Kingdom general election and after the dissolution of Parliament in 1918 the area was part of the County Waterford constituency.

The West Waterford constituency, 1885–1918

== Boundaries ==
This constituency comprised the western part of County Waterford. It included the baronies of Coshmore and Coshbride, Decies within Drum, and that part of the barony of Decies-without-Drum not contained within the constituency of East Waterford.

== Members of Parliament ==
Election	Member	Party
1885	Jasper Douglas Pyne	Nationalist
1888	Seat vacant'	
1890	Alfred Webb	Nationalist
1892	Alfred Webb	Anti-Parnellite Nationalist
1895	James John O'Shee (formerly Shee)	Anti-Parnellite Nationalist
1900	James John O'Shee (formerly Shee)	Nationalist
1918	Constituency abolished – see County Waterford	

== Elections ==
=== Elections in the 1880s ===
1885 general election: West Waterford
Party	Candidate	Votes	%	±%
Irish Parliamentary	Douglas Pyne	3,746	91.3	
Irish Conservative	Richard Francis Keane	359	8.6	
Majority		3,387	82.7	
Turnout		4,105	68.1	
Registered electors		6,025		
Irish Parliamentary win (new seat)				

1886 general election: West Waterford
Party	Candidate	Votes	%	±%
Irish Parliamentary	Douglas Pyne	Unopposed		
Registered electors		6,025		
Irish Parliamentary hold				

=== Elections in the 1890s ===
Pyne's death causes a by-election.

By-election, 1890: West Waterford
Party	Candidate	Votes	%	±%
Irish Parliamentary	Alfred Webb	Unopposed		
Registered electors		6,353		
Irish Parliamentary hold				

1892 general election: West Waterford
Party	Candidate	Votes	%	±%
Irish National Federation	Alfred Webb	Unopposed		
Registered electors		6,667		
Irish National Federation gain from Irish Parliamentary				

1895 general election: West Waterford
Party	Candidate	Votes	%	±%
Irish National Federation	Alfred Webb	Unopposed		
Registered electors		5,235		
Irish National Federation hold				

Webb's resignation causes a by-election.

By-election, 1895: West Waterford
Party	Candidate	Votes	%	±%
Irish National Federation	J. J. Shee (Note: Shee changed his name to O'Shee after the 1900 election)	Unopposed		
Registered electors		5,235		
Irish National Federation hold				

=== Elections in the 1900s ===
1900 general election: West Waterford
Party	Candidate	Votes	%	±%
Irish Parliamentary	J. J. Shee	Unopposed		
Registered electors		5,067		
Irish Parliamentary hold				

1906 general election: West Waterford
Party	Candidate	Votes	%	±%
Irish Parliamentary	J. J. O'Shee	Unopposed		
Registered electors		4,426		
Irish Parliamentary hold				

=== Elections in the 1910s ===
January 1910 general election: West Waterford
Party	Candidate	Votes	%	±%
Irish Parliamentary	J. J. O'Shee	1,753	57.3	N/A
Ind. Nationalist	E. Arthur Ryan	1,309	42.7	New
Majority		444	14.6	N/A
Turnout		3,062	74.0	N/A
Registered electors		4,139		
Irish Parliamentary hold		Swing	N/A	

December 1910 general election: West Waterford
Party	Candidate	Votes	%	±%
Irish Parliamentary	J. J. O'Shee	2,402	76.8	+19.5
All-for-Ireland	Maurice Healy	727	23.2	New
Majority		1,675	53.6	+39.0
Turnout		3,129	75.6	+1.6
Registered electors		4,139		
Irish Parliamentary hold		Swing		

== Notes and references ==
Notes

== Sources ==
- Leigh Rayment's Historical List of MPs – Constituencies beginning with "W" (part 1)
- Walker, Brian M., ed. (1978). Parliamentary Election Results in Ireland, 1801–1922. Dublin: Royal Irish Academy. ISBN 0901714127.
