= 1877 County Waterford by-election =

UK Parliamentary by-election

A 1977 by-election was held on 20 January 1877 for the UK House of Commons constituency of County Waterford to fill the vacancy caused by the death of Home Rule League MP Sir John Esmonde, one of the two members returned in the 1874 general election. The by-election was won by the Home Rule candidate, James Delahunty.

A Home Rule meeting in Dungarvan on 2 January 1877 endorsed the candidacy of James Esmonde, Kilkenny landlord and brother of the deceased MP, ahead of those of Delahunty, Denis Joseph Rearden and G. C. P. Fitzgerald. When the meeting had asked candidates to stand down if not endorsed by it, Delahunty had declined to give such an undertaking. The Kilkenny Farmers' Association had placed an advertisement in The Freeman's Journal and The Waterford News warning voters that Esmonde was "the true type of a bad Irish landlord".

On 14 January, Delahunty and Esmonde were formally nominated, as was Liberal candidate Frederick Lehmann; Esmonde withdrew before polling day.

County Waterford by-election, 1877 (1 seat)
| Party | Candidate | Votes | % | ±% |
|---|---|---|---|---|
| Home Rule | James Delahunty | 1,799 | 77.1 | +26.1 |
| Liberal | Frederick Lehmann | 534 | 22.9 | New |
| Majority | | 1,265 | 54.2 | N/A |
| Turnout | | 2,333 | 71.2 | −24.0 |
| Registered electors | | 3,276 | | |
| Home Rule hold | | Swing | | |
