= Sir Richard Musgrave, 3rd Baronet, of Tourin =

Irish baronet and politician

Sir Richard Musgrave, Bt

Member of Parliament for County Waterford
- In office 1835–1837 Serving with Patrick Power, William Villiers-Stuart
- Preceded by: Sir Richard Keane, Bt; John Matthew Galwey
- Succeeded by: William Villiers-Stuart; John Power
- In office 1831–1832 Serving with Robert Power
- Preceded by: Daniel O'Connell; Lord George Beresford
- Succeeded by: Sir Richard Keane, Bt; John Matthew Galwey

Personal details
- Born: Richard Musgrave; 6 January 1790
- Died: 7 July 1859 (aged 69) Whiting Bay, County Waterford
- Spouse: Frances Newcome (after 1815)
- Relations: Sir Richard Musgrave, Bt (grandson)
- Children: 5
- Education: Trinity College Dublin

Sir Richard Musgrave, 3rd Baronet (6 January 1790 – 7 July 1859) was an Irish baronet and politician.

== Early life ==
He was the eldest son of Sir Christopher Frederick Musgrave, 2nd Baronet and Jane Beere (a daughter of John Beere of Ballyboy, County Tipperary). Among his siblings was John Musgrave and Anne Musgrave.

Musgrave's uncle, and namesake, Sir Richard Musgrave had been a collector of excise for the port of Dublin and the author of an anti-Catholic History of the Irish Rebellion of 1798, and sat for Lismore in the Irish Parliament from 1778 to 1800. On his death in 1818, his Irish estates and baronetcy had passed to his brother, Musgrave's father.

He graduated from Trinity College Dublin in 1807.

== Career ==
Musgrave was High Sheriff of County Waterford in 1820 and Member of Parliament for County Waterford in the Parliament of the United Kingdom from 1831 to 1832 and, again, from 1835 to 1837. At the 1832 dissolution, Musgrave retired from county Waterford. He was elected unopposed as a Liberal in 1835 and stood down in 1837. Thereafter he was active in the local repeal campaign and in 1843 publicly resigned his commission of the peace in protest at the Peel administration's dismissal of magistrates who had attended repeal meetings.

He succeeded to the baronetcy, of Tourin, in September 1826, which had been created for his uncle, Sir Richard Musgrave, in 1782.

== Personal life ==
On 29 July 1815, Musgrave was married to Frances Newcome, daughter of William Newcome, D.D., Primate of Ireland. Together, they were the parents of five sons:

- Sir Richard Musgrave, 4th Baronet (1820–1874), who married Frances Mary Yates, the eldest of five daughters of John Ashton Yates, MP for County Carlow. Her sister Mary Ellen Yates was the second wife of Robert Needham Philips, MP for Bury, and her youngest sister, Sophia Yates, was married to Louis Tennyson-d'Eyncourt, a cousin of the poet Alfred, Lord Tennyson, and the youngest son of the Charles Tennyson-d'Eyncourt of Bayons Manor.
- Christopher Musgrave (1823–1872)
- Robert Musgrave (1830–1878)
- Edward Musgrave (1834–1911), who married Anastasia Letitia Gee, a daughter of James Gee.
- John Musgrave (1840–1870)

Sir Richard died at Whiting Bay, County Waterford, on 7 July 1859 and was succeeded by his eldest son Richard.

=== Descendants ===
Through his eldest son Richard, he was a grandfather of Sir Richard John Musgrave, 5th Baronet (1850–1930).

Through his son Edward, he was a grandfather of James Musgraves, and great-grandfather of Sir Christopher Norman Musgrave, 6th Baronet (1892–1956)

Parliament of the United Kingdom
Preceded by Daniel O'Connell; Lord George Beresford	Member of Parliament for County Waterford; 1831 – 1832; With: Robert Power	Succeeded by Sir Richard Keane, Bt; John Matthew Galwey
Preceded by Sir Richard Keane, Bt; John Matthew Galwey	Member of Parliament for County Waterford; 1835 – 1837; With: Patrick Power 1835; William Villiers-Stuart 1835–37	Succeeded by William Villiers-Stuart; John Power
Baronetage of Ireland
Preceded by Christopher Frederick Musgrave	Baronet (of Tourin); 1826 – 1859	Succeeded by Richard Musgrave
