= Alfred Webb =

Irish Parliamentary Party politician

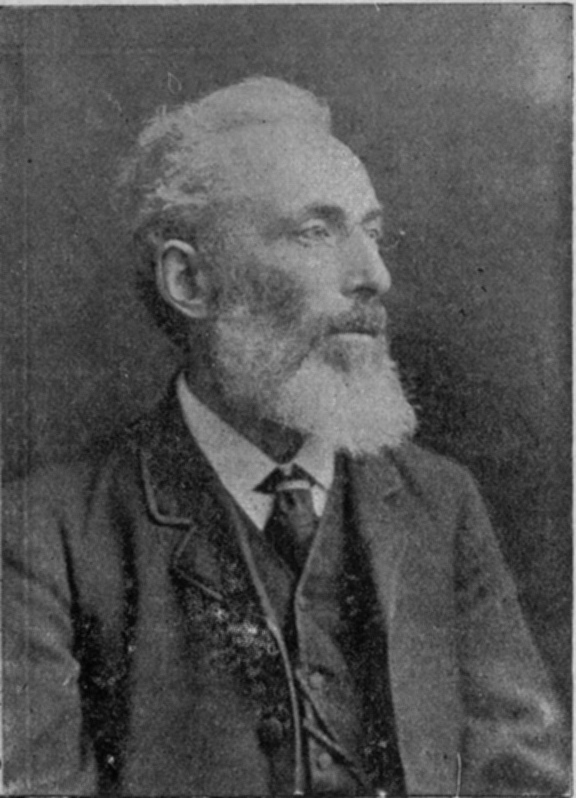

Alfred John Webb (10 June 1834 – 30 July 1908) was an Irish Quaker from a family of activist printers. He became an Irish Parliamentary Party politician and Member of Parliament (MP), as well as a participant in nationalist movements around the world. He supported Butt's Home Government Association and the United Irish League. At Madras in 1894, he became the third non-Indian (after George Yule and William Wedderburn) to preside over the Indian National Congress.

== Early life ==
Alfred Webb was the first child and only son of the three children of Richard Davis Webb and Hannah Waring Webb (1810–1862). The family ran a printing shop in Dublin and belonged to a Quaker group that supported reforms such as suffrage, the abolition of slavery and anti-imperialism. The family press printed booklets for many of these causes and, in turn, their regular customers grew to include other similar organisations, including the Irish Protestant Home Rule Association and the Ladies’ Land League, an organisation founded by Fanny and Anna Parnell in 1880 that advocated on behalf of poor tenant farmers.

== Career ==
Alfred Webb was interested in literature and history and began to write A Compendium of Irish Biography. In 1865, he began to take a more active interest in Irish politics. He was inspired by the Fenians, although he believed in non-violence and the Fenians of that time believed that Ireland could only gain independence through an armed revolution. He was first elected to the House of Commons of the United Kingdom on 24 February 1890, when he won a by-election for the West Waterford constituency. He was again returned for West Waterford in the 1892 general election, this time as an anti-Parnellite MP. In December, 1883, he resigned from the position of Land League treasurer, complaining of Parnell's 'autocratic management of funds'.

His family had taken an interest in the welfare of British colonies and had been outspoken opponents of the opium traffic into China. Webb was a close friend of Dadabhai Naoroji, a key member of the Indian National Congress, who was also a friend of other Irish nationalists including Michael Davitt and Frank Hugh O’Donnell. He was elected, as a member of the Liberal party, in 1892, the year of the Liberal landslide to the Finsbury Central Westminster seat. While O'Donnell attempted to involve Naoroji in Irish politics, Webb was invited by Naoroji to preside over the Indian National Congress in 1894.

Webb was a supporter of Anti-Caste, Britain's first anti-racism journal which fellow Quaker activist Catherine Impey founded in 1888. Webb was able to rally subscribers and activists for the journal around the world. For example, although he was not a regular subscriber, Webb and Dadabhai Naoroji co-signed a letter with others to request support for a new association: ‘The Society for the Furtherance of Human Brotherhood’.

He was laid to rest in the Quaker burial ground in Temple Hill, Monkstown, Dublin.

== See also ==
- Catherine Impey
- William Wedderburn

== Notes ==
Parliament of the United Kingdom
Preceded by Douglas Pyne	Member of Parliament for West Waterford; 1890 – 1895	Succeeded by James John O'Shee
