= Douglas Pyne =

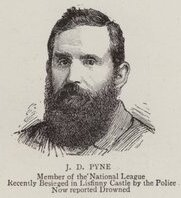
- Illustration of Pyne by Sydney Prior Hall, 1888

Member of Parliament for West Waterford
- In office 1885 – 14 November 1888
- Preceded by: New constituency
- Succeeded by: Alfred Webb (1890)

Personal details
- Born: Jasper Douglas Pyne; 1847 Oxted, Surrey, England
- Died: 14 November 1888 (aged 40–41) Irish Sea
- Cause of death: Drowning (presumed)
- Party: Irish Parliamentary Party
- Spouse: Helena Pyne (m. 1871)
- Education: Tonbridge School

Jasper Douglas Pyne (1847 – 14 November 1888) was an Irish nationalist politician from County Waterford who served as a member of parliament (MP) from 1885 until his unexplained death. Pyne was the fourth child of the Reverend William Masters Pyne and his wife Marian. Rev W. M. Pyne came from Ballyvolane near Cork but he was the Rector of St Mary's Church in Oxted, Surrey, from 1828 to 1869, a remarkable tenure of 41 years. The Pyne family lived in the Rectory (now called Oxted Place) until the Rev W. M. Pyne inherited Ballyvolane House on his father's death.

== Career ==
Douglas Pyne was educated at Tonbridge School and inherited Lisfinny Castle near Tallow, County Waterford from his uncle. Pyne was an ardent advocate for the rights of the Irish tenant farmers. As an Irish Parliamentary Party candidate for the Western division of Waterford at the general election in October 1885, he was called to court to show cause why he should not give security to keep the peace. Pyne had made a speech in which he had said that "there are two ways of treating a land-grabber – one was to shoot him, and the other, which he believed was the best, was to treat him with all charity and the cold of silence." However, the magistrates refused to consider the authorities' application and Pyne was set free, winning the subsequent election with over 90% of the votes cast, and taking his seat in the House of Commons of the United Kingdom.

In November 1887, during the Land War, a warrant was issued for Pyne's arrest. Pyne had previously destroyed the entrance to his Castle, and retreated to an upper storey, where he had laid in provisions. When there was a crowd gathered Pine would descend on the pulley and bucket which he had fixed to the third floor and address the crowd from 30 ft off the ground, while the police looked on helplessly.

On the night of 9 November 1887 the people of Tallow marched to the Castle led by the town band. Thousands of visitors came to Lisfinny day after day, encouraging and cheering Pyne. He addressed the crowd at Lisfinny for the last time on 12 December, but escaped that night, having passed unrecognised through the police cordon after the cattle were driven in earlier to surround the castle.

Pyne was arrested in London on 10 February 1888, as he was entering the House of Commons. On 14 February, he was sentenced to three months' imprisonment, which was later reduced to six weeks.

In November 1888, Pyne disappeared off a boat between Holyhead and Dublin, and was presumed to have drowned. His parliamentary seat remained vacant for a further fifteen months, before the writ was moved for the by-election.

Parliament of the United Kingdom
New constituency	Member of Parliament for West Waterford; 1885 – 1888	Succeeded by Alfred Webb
