= Sir John Esmonde, 10th Baronet =

Irish nationalist politician (1826–1876)

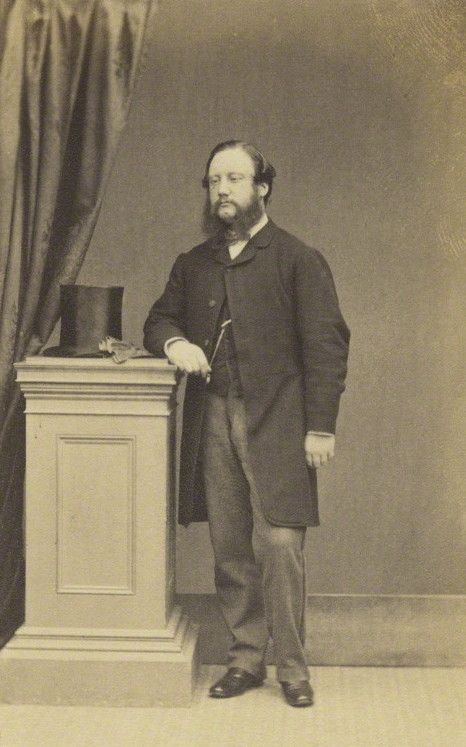
Sir John Esmonde, 10th Baronet.

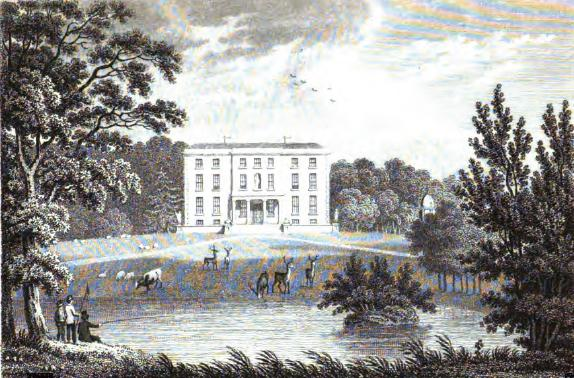
Ballynastragh House, County Wexford, home of the Esmonde family- from a drawing published 1826,

Sir John Esmonde, 10th Baronet (16 May 1826 – 9 December 1876) was an Irish nationalist politician. He sat in the House of Commons of the United Kingdom from 1852 until his death 25 years later.

== Early life and family ==
Esmonde was the son of Royal Navy officer James Esmonde and his wife Anna Maria (née Murphy).

He was educated at Clongowes Wood College and at Trinity College Dublin, where he graduated in 1850 with an honours degree in classics.

He was called to the bar of Ireland in the same year.

In 1861 he married Louisa Grattan, the fourth daughter of Henry Grattan MP, and granddaughter of 18th-century parliamentary leader Henry Grattan. They had four sons and two daughters, Thomas, Laurence, Walter, John, Ellice, and Annette.

In 1868, he inherited the baronetcy and estates of his uncle Thomas.

== Career ==
He was elected at the 1852 general election as one of the two members of parliament (MPs) for County Waterford. Both Esmonde and his fellow Waterford MP Nicholas Mahon Power were elected as candidates of the Irish Liberal Party, which had been in alliance with nationalists. Power was accused of acting "selfishly and parsimoniously" towards Esmonde, who was described at the time as hoisting "free trade and liberal colours". Esmonde's election was the subject of a petition by the defeated Conservative candidate Richard Hely-Hutchinson, who alleged personation and intimidation. The names of people who were not entitled to vote were struck off the return, but Esmonde's election was upheld.

The alliance of nationalists and liberals faltered after the election, and Esmonde was one of 40 Irish Liberals who transferred their support to the new Independent Irish Party. The new party foundered, and Esmonde was re-elected as a Liberal at the next 4 general elections.

Sir John Esmonde, 10th Baronet
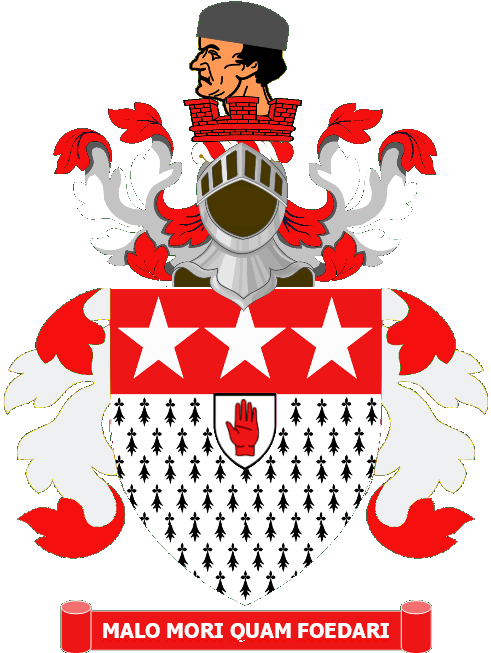
- Crest: Out of a mural crown Gules a head in profile wearing a helmet all Proper.
- Shield: Ermine on a chief Gules three mullets Argent.
- Motto: Malo Mori Quam Foedari (Had Rather Die Than Be Dishonoured)

In January 1866, Esmonde was appointed as High Sheriff of Wexford. On 2 June, he was appointed by as a Junior Lord of the Treasury in the Liberal Government of Earl Russell. As an office of profit under the Crown, the Parliamentary rules of the time required him to seek re-election, and on 9 June he was returned unopposed. However, his time in office was short, because Russell's government fell before the end of June, to be replaced by a Conservative government.

In 1869, he was appointed as a deputy lieutenant of County Wexford, succeeding his uncle Thomas. Described by The Times newspaper of London as a "zealous and attached member of the Roman Catholic communion", Esmonde was listed in 1869 as one of 50 Catholic baronets, and 38 Catholic MPs. He was one of the speakers at a rally in Dublin in November 1870 to protest at the loss of the temporal power of the Pope.

At the 1874 general election, he was returned again for Waterford, this time as a candidate of the newly reconstituted Home Rule Party. He died in office two years later, aged 50. Esmonde had also been a justice of the peace for counties Waterford, Wexford, and Wicklow, a captain in the Wexford militia, and a member of the Royal Irish Academy.

His parliamentary seat was won at the resulting by-election by the Home Rule candidate James Delahunty, and he was succeeded in the baronetcy by his son Thomas.

== See also ==
- Esmonde baronets

Parliament of the United Kingdom
Preceded by Robert Keating; Nicholas Mahon Power	Member of Parliament for County Waterford; 1852 – 1876; With: Nicholas Mahon Power to 1859; Walter Cecil Talbot 1859–65; Earl of Tyrone 1865–66; Edmond de la Poer 1866–73; Henry Villiers-Stuart 1873–74; Lord Charles Beresford from 1874	Succeeded by Lord Charles Beresford; James Delahunty
Baronetage of Ireland
Preceded by Thomas Esmonde	Baronet (of Ballynastragh); 1868–1876	Succeeded by Thomas Henry Grattan Esmonde
