= Elizabeth Cass =

English seamstress and dress designer

Elizabeth Langley (née Cass; 1863–1956) was an English seamstress and dress designer whose mistaken arrest for prostitution in 1887 became a minor cause célèbre.

== Early life ==
Cass was born in Grantham, Lincolnshire, and grew up in Stockton-on-Tees. After working as a seamstress, she moved to London to be a dress designer early in 1887. She was employed by Mrs Mary Ann Bowman, and lived on her premises at 19 Southampton Row.

== Mistaken arrest ==
On 28 June 1887 Cass went out in the late evening to do some shopping at Jay's Shop at 243–253 Regent Street (a respected retailer of silk and millinery, holding a Royal Warrant). The week had seen Queen Victoria's Golden Jubilee, and London was thronged with people enjoying a month of record sunshine.

Jay's was closed, and the pavement was full of people. As she pushed her way through the crowd on Oxford Street to go home, she was suddenly arrested by PC DR 42 Endacott, of Tottenham Court Road Police Station. She was taken to the police station and charged with solicitation and prostitution, and the next morning she appeared at Great Marlborough Street Police Court before Robert Milnes Newton, one of two stipendiary magistrates. PC Endacott gave evidence of the arrest and testified that he had seen her three times before in Regent Street late at night soliciting for prostitution.

Cass's employer, Mrs Bowman, was called in her defence and testified that she had been in London only a few months, and had never before been out late at night. Further, she was a respectable woman of perfect character in a good job. Bowman was unshakeable in her evidence, giving the magistrate no option but to find Cass not guilty. But he added the following warning:

Just take my advice: if you are a respectable girl, as you say you are, don't walk in Regent Street at night, for if you do you will either be fined or sent to prison after the caution I have given you.

The clear implication is that the magistrate believed Cass to be guilty, but had persuaded Bowman to perjure herself to secure her acquittal.

On 30 June Bowman wrote to the Metropolitan Police headquarters to complain about the police's action in the case. The day after, Llewellyn Atherley-Jones, Liberal MP for North West Durham, first raised the case in Parliament. Atherley-Jones, a barrister by profession, took up Cass's case and on 5 July he asked the Home Secretary Henry Matthews to order an inquiry. Matthews, noting that no conviction resulted, gave what seemed to Atherley-Jones to be a flippant answer and Atherley-Jones then decided he would seek to raise the matter on the adjournment. He managed to defeat the government by five votes.

The Home Secretary then ordered the Commissioner of Police for the Metropolis, Sir Charles Warren, to undertake an inquiry. PC Endacott was suspended on 6 July and the Lord Chancellor began an inquiry into the conduct of Mr. Newton. The Metropolitan Police inquiry opened on 11 July and after six days of hearings concluded on 26 July. The report did not make any findings as to whether the arrest was justified (calling for the evidence to be tested in a court under oath), but Sir Charles Warren concluded "I am not prepared to say that I can see any grounds for accusing PC Endacott of wilful perjury. However, that is a matter on which I think the Public Prosecutors should decide."

Bowman and Cass had already begun a private prosecution of PC Endacott for perjury, and after due consideration the Law Officers wrote to their solicitors offering to take over the case, or permitting the case to go ahead under their direction. They chose the second option. Colleagues within the Metropolitan Police raised a subscription to pay for Endacott's defence. Meanwhile, the informal inquiry into the magistrate had concluded in secret, with the decision to give Newton a formal reprimand. Newton had relied for justification of his warning to Cass on a statute that allowed a magistrate to issue such a warning to a defendant who had been found guilty but whom the magistrate felt was undeserving of any sentence, and the Lord Chancellor's letter highlighted this as a mistake in law.

== Perjury case ==
The Grand Jury found a true bill against PC Endacott for perjury on 13 September but the trial was postponed to the Michaelmas Term, eventually beginning on 31 October. On 1 November, Cass (now Mrs Langley) was called to give evidence; afterwards Mr. Justice Stephen heard a submission (in the absence of the jury) from the prosecution and ruled that the case was confined to whether PC Endacott committed perjury in saying that he had seen Cass three times before in Regent Street. The judge further said that in his own view, there was no evidence that Endacott had been wilfully misstating the truth: the most likely explanation was that he had been making an honest mistake. The Solicitor-General accepted that view and withdrew the prosecution.

Mrs Langley and her defenders were not pleased by this outcome. The inquiry and the trial had given the opportunity to PC Endacott's legal representatives to make further assaults on her character, and Llewellyn Atherley-Jones insisted his original objection had been to the actions of the magistrate.
