= Walter Carpenter =

Royal Navy Admiral (1834–1904)

Admiral The Honourable Walter Carpenter
- Born: Walter Talbot; 27 March 1834; Ingestre, Staffordshire, England
- Died: 13 May 1904 (aged 70)
- Burial place: Bolton-on-Swale, North Yorkshire, England
- Military career
- Allegiance: United Kingdom
- Branch: Royal Navy
- Rank: Admiral
- Commands: HMS Royal Alfred; HMS Temeraire; HMS Belleisle; Coast of Ireland Station

Admiral Walter Cecil Carpenter (27 March 1834 – 13 May 1904), also known as Walter Cecil Talbot until he changed his name by Royal licence, was a Royal Navy officer who became a senior officer, Coast of Ireland Station.

== Early life ==
Walter Talbot (then so surnamed) was born on 27 March 1834 in Ingestre, Staffordshire, England and died on 13 May 1904 at Westminster part of central London, and he was buried on 15 May 1904 in Bolton-on-Swale, North Yorkshire, England. He was the second son of Henry Chetwynd-Talbot, 18th Earl of Shrewsbury and Lady Sarah Elizabeth, the daughter of Henry Beresford, 2nd Marquess of Waterford, by his marriage to Sarah Carpenter whereupon he took her surname by royal licence. He played first-class cricket for the Marylebone Cricket Club in 1851, making a single appearance against Middlesex at Lord's.

== Naval career ==
Walter Talbot (then so surnamed) entered the Royal Navy in 1847. Promoted to lieutenant on 22 September 1854, he served on HMS Hannibal as a lieutenant from 24 June 1856 during the Crimean War in the Black Sea and then later in the Mediterranean Sea. He was assigned to HMS Nile on 6 December 1858. Promoted to commander on 16 June 1859, he was on HMS Steady from 18 November 1864 to 2 March 1865 serving in the West Indies and off North America. He was aboard HMS Fawn, in the West Indies, from 2 March 1865 to 14 April 1866.

Promoted to captain on 11 April 1866, he became commanding officer the frigate HMS Royal Alfred in September 1867. He served as commanding officer of HMS Bristol, a naval cadet training ship, from 19 January 1871 to 15 December 1871. He again commanded another naval cadet training ship, HMS Ariadne from 16 December 1871 to 2 September 1873. From 1873 until 1876 he served ashore at Portsmouth Naval Home Command and as an aide to Admiral Edward Fanshawe and he served as flag captain in HMS Duke of Wellington from 16 October 1876.

He was assigned as commanding officer of the battleship HMS Temeraire in March 1880 and became commanding officer of the battleship HMS Belleisle in March 1881. In addition he was cited as "Naval aide de camp" to Queen Victoria from 1880 to 1882.

Walter Carpenter (then so surnamed in 1868) was promoted to rear admiral on 29 December 1882 and was assigned as the Senior Officer, Coast of Ireland Station on 1 January 1887 before being promoted to vice admiral on 8 November 1888 and going on half pay in December 1888 due to illness. Promoted to full admiral on 28 May 1894, he fully retired on 11 March 1896.

== Politics ==
Carpenter served as Member of Parliament for County Waterford from 1859 to 1865.

== Family ==
Walter assumed, by Royal Licence dated 1 June 1868, the surname and arms of Carpenter, in lieu of those of Talbot, in accordance with the testamentary injunction of Sarah, Countess of Tyrconnell, widow of John Delavel Carpenter, last Earl of Tyrconnell.

Walter Carpenter (then so surnamed) married Maria Georgiana Mundy on 27 October 1869 at the Parish Church, Marylebone, London, England. She died in childbirth on 25 April 1876 in 33 Warwick Square, London, England.

Carpenter then married Beatrice, daughter of Thomas de Grey, 5th Baron Walsingham and Hon. Emily Elizabeth Julia Thellusson, on 10 February 1887 in St. George's, Hanover Square, London, England. Beatrice was born on 16 November 1853, christened in Merton, Norfolk, England and died on 16 October 1927. There were no children from this union.

== Coat of arms ==
Walter Talbot, later surnamed Carpenter, inherited, by Royal license and the required surname change, a coat of arms from his first wife, the widow Lady Carpenter. These arms appear to be of French or Norman heritage, "Paly of six argent and gules, on a chevron azure 3 cross crosslets or." Crest, on a wreath a globe in a frame all or. Supporters, two horses, party-perfess, embattled argent and gules. Motto: "Per Acuta Belli" (Through the Asperities of War). These arms descend from John Carpenter, the younger (c. 1372 – 1442) who was the noted Town Clerk of London during the reigns of King Henry V & King Henry VI.

These arms are often referred to as the Hereford Arms, named for the later ancestral home of the Carpenter family in Hereford, England. The crest, supporters and motto apparently have changed several times over the centuries.

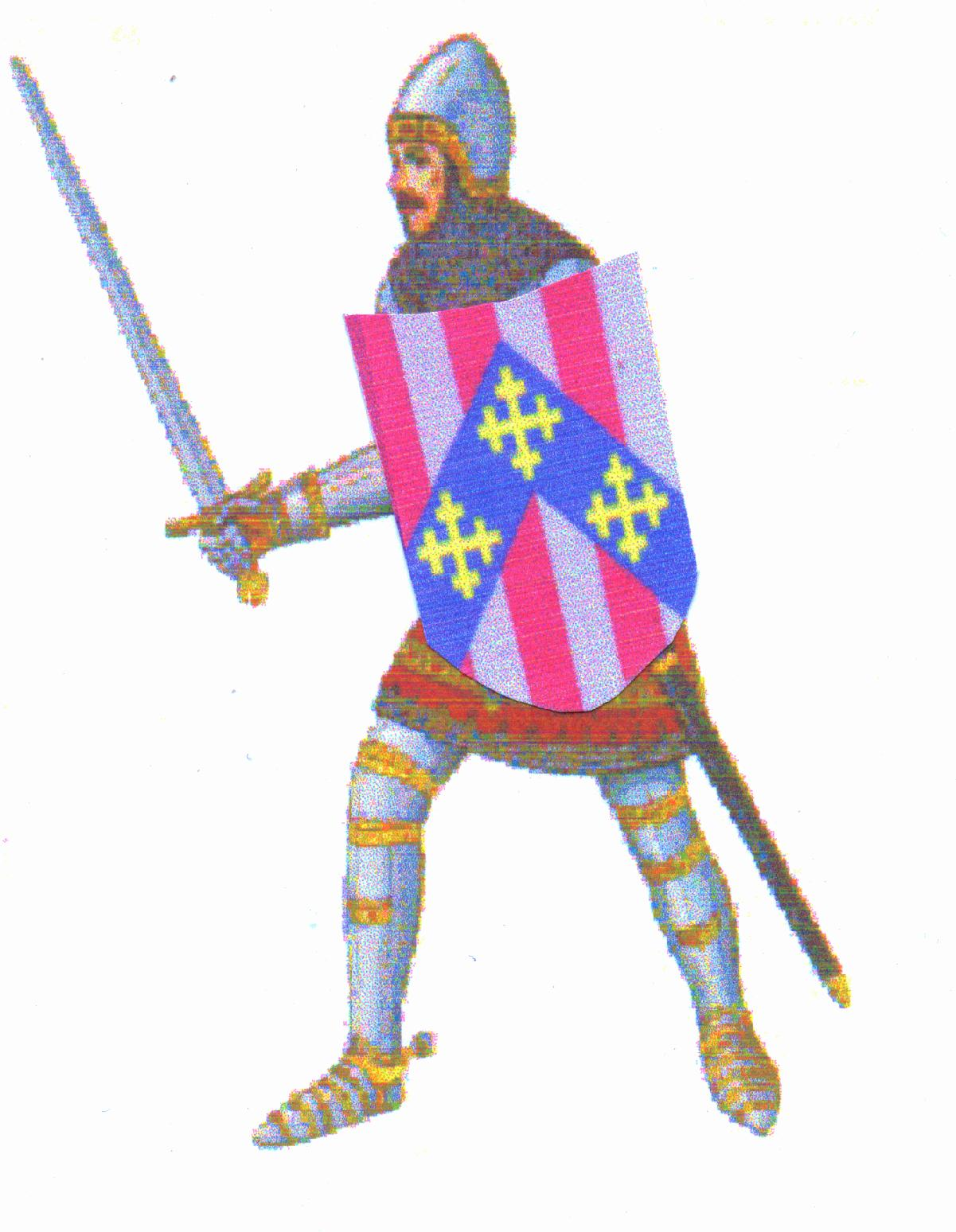
Sample of a medieval knight with an early Carpenter coat of arms on shield

Because of the lack of surviving children of Walter Carpenter the arms were later given by Royal license to another relative after his death in 1904. Sir William Boyd Carpenter (1841–1918), an English clergyman of the Established church of England, Bishop of Ripon, afterwards a Canon of Westminster and Chaplain to the reigning sovereign of England, wrote in a letter dated 7 August 1907 that his family bore the Hereford Arms. Sir Noel Paton, upon painting the Family Arms, informed him that the supporters were originally a round-handled sword, which in drawing over time became shortened, until nothing but the cross and globe were left beneath it. Those Hereford Arms were used by "John Carpenter, town clerk of London, who died 1442 A. D." His grandson, the subject of this article, John Boyd-Carpenter, Baron Boyd-Carpenter (1908–1998), continued the Arms into the new century by passing it down to his son, Thomas Boyd-Carpenter, who was himself knighted after a military career as a Lieutenant-General and for public service.

There is no direct male-to-male Carpenter descent connecting the Honorable Admiral Walter Carpenter with Sir William Boyd Carpenter. The family connection is by marriage through the females in the family.

The Hereford coat of arms described above should not be confused with the arms of Bishop Richard Carpenter (c1450s?–1503) presented in the "Visitations of the County of Oxford taken in 1566, 1574, and 1634, published in 1871, which describe the arms displayed in the buildings at the University in Oxford – "In the Lyberarye of Baliall College." – as recorded by the officials performing the visitations in those years. The Visitations describe the arms of Bishop Richard Carpenter (c1450s–1503) as: "Paly of nine Gu. and Az. on a chevron Arg. surmounted by a mitre Or, three cross crosslets of—nine pales alternating red and blue, with a silver chevron bearing three gold cross-crosslets.

== Ancestry ==
Ancestry of the Hon. Walter Cecil Carpenter

8. John Chetwynd-Talbot, 1st Earl Talbot
4. Charles Chetwynd-Talbot, 2nd Earl Talbot
9. Lady Charlotte Hill, Countess Talbot
2. Henry Chetwynd-Talbot, 18th Earl of Shrewsbury
10. Charles Lambart
5. Lady Frances Thomasine Lambart, Countess Talbot
11. Frances Dutton
1. The Hon. Walter Cecil Carpenter
12. George Beresford, 1st Marquess of Waterford
6. Henry Beresford, 2nd Marquess of Waterford
13. Elizabeth Monck, Marchioness of Waterford
3. Lady Sarah Elizabeth Beresford, Countess of Shrewsbury
14. George Carpenter, 2nd Earl of Tyrconnell
7. Susanna Carpenter, Marchioness of Waterford
15. Lady Sarah Hussey Delaval, Countess of Tyrconnell

Parliament of the United Kingdom
Preceded by Nicholas Mahon Power; Sir John Esmonde	Member of Parliament for County Waterford; 1859 – 1865; With: Sir John Esmonde	Succeeded by Earl of Tyrone; Sir John Esmonde
Military offices
Preceded by Henry Hickley	Senior Officer, Coast of Ireland Station; 1887–1888	Succeeded by James Erskine
