= John O'Keefe (Irish politician) =

John O'Keefe MP

Member of Parliament for Dungarvan
- In office 31 January 1874 – 10 June 1877
- Preceded by: Henry Matthews
- Succeeded by: Frank Hugh O'Donnell

Personal details
- Born: 1827
- Died: 10 June 1877 (aged 49–50)
- Party: Home Rule League

John O'Keefe (1827 – 10 June 1877) was an Irish Home Rule League politician.

He sat as Home Rule Member of Parliament (MP) for Dungarvan in 1874 until his death at age 49 in 1877. He was expelled from the Home Rule League in February 1877 for having supported the Liberal Frederick Lehmann against the Home Rule candidate James Delahunty at the parliamentary by-election for County Waterford in January 1877.

Parliament of the United Kingdom
Preceded by Henry Matthews	Member of Parliament for Dungarvan; 1874–1877	Succeeded by Frank Hugh O'Donnell
