= Lord Lieutenant of Waterford =

Ceremonial officer in Waterford, Ireland

This is a list of people who served as Lord Lieutenant of County Waterford.

There were lieutenants of counties in Ireland until the reign of James II, when they were renamed governors. The office of Lord Lieutenant was recreated on 23 August 1831.

== Governors ==
- George Beresford, 1st Marquess of Waterford: 1766–1800
- Henry Beresford, 2nd Marquess of Waterford 1801–1826
- Lord George Beresford: 1826–1831

== Lord Lieutenants ==
- Henry Villiers-Stuart, 1st Baron Stuart de Decies: 17 October 1831 – 23 January 1874
- Sir Richard Musgrave, 4th Baronet: 9 March 1874 – 8 July 1874
- John Beresford, 5th Marquess of Waterford: 19 August 1874 – 23 October 1895
- Spencer Cavendish, 8th Duke of Devonshire: 7 December 1895 – 24 March 1908
- Henry Villiers-Stuart 7 July 1908 – 8 September 1908
- Edmond de la Poer 5 February 1909 – 30 August 1915
- John de la Poer 22 December 1915 – 1922
