= Sir Richard Keane, 2nd Baronet =

Irish politician

Richard Keane (March 1780 – 16 February 1855) was an Irish politician.

Keane lived at Cappoquin House in County Waterford. In 1829, he succeeded his father to become the 2nd Baronet Keane. At the 1832 UK general election, he stood for the Whigs in County Waterford, winning a seat. He stood down at the 1835 UK general election. He lived for a further twenty years, becoming lieutenant colonel of the Waterford Militia.

Parliament of the United Kingdom
Preceded by Richard Musgrave; Robert Power	Member of Parliament for County Waterford; 1832 – 1835; With: John Matthew Galwey	Succeeded by Richard Musgrave; Patrick Power
