= Charles Robert Barry =

Irish lawyer and Lord Justice of Appeal

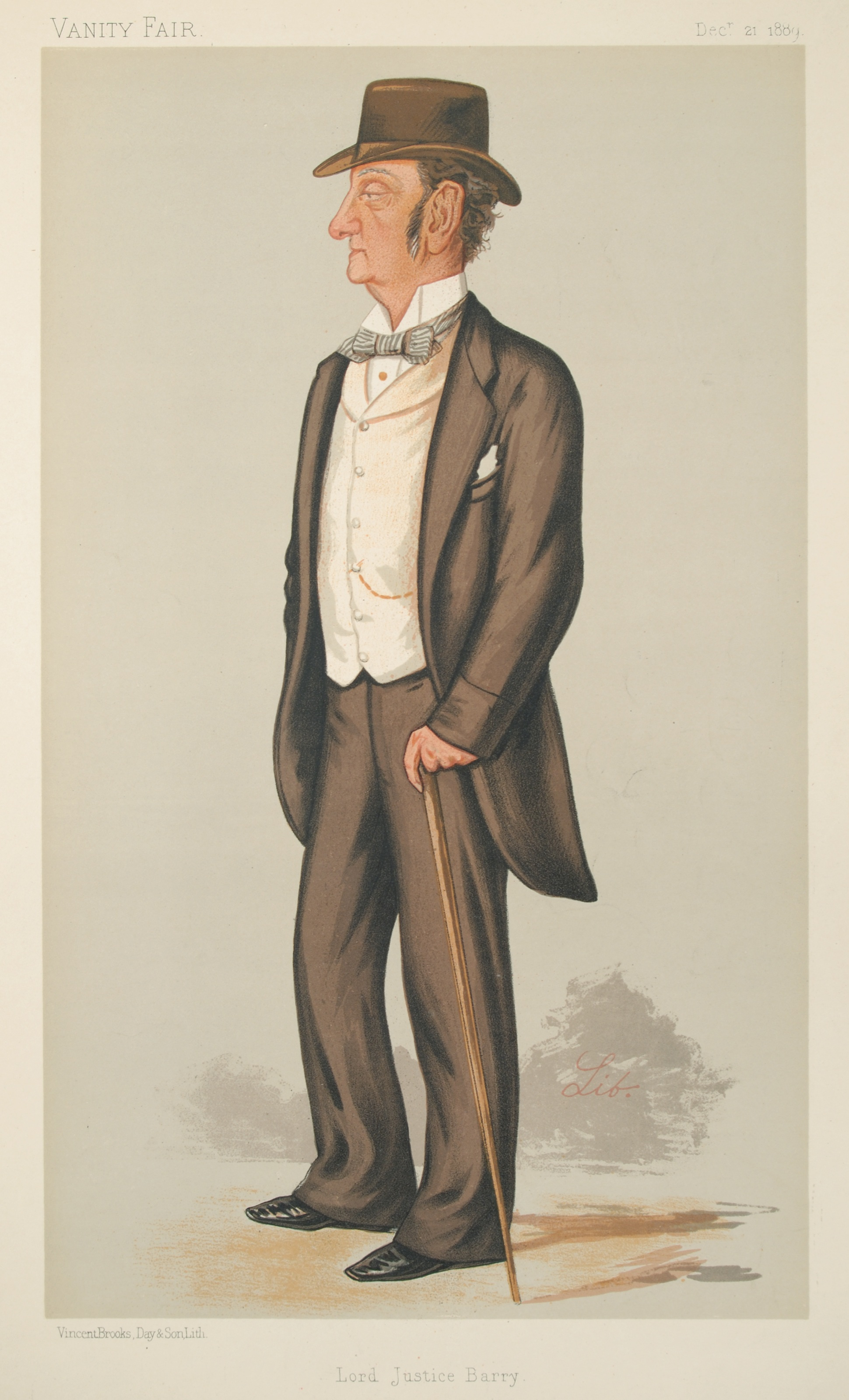
Lord Justice Barry as depicted by Liborio Prosperi in Vanity Fair, 21 December 1889

Charles Robert Barry QC, PC (3 January 1823 – 15 May 1897) was an Irish politician and lawyer who rose to become a Lord Justice of Appeal for Ireland.

== Legal and judicial career ==
He was born in Limerick, a son of James Barry, solicitor, and educated at Dalton's School, Limerick, Midleton College, County Cork, and Trinity College Dublin, and admitted to Lincoln's Inn.

Barry was admitted to the Irish Bar in 1848 and was appointed Queen's Counsel in 1859. He was Member of Parliament for Dungarvan from 1865 to 1868, He was appointed Law Adviser to the Lord Lieutenant of Ireland in 1865, and was made Third Serjeant-at-law (Ireland) in 1866. He served as Solicitor-General for Ireland from 1868 to 1870, and as such prosecuted the Fenians in 1868. From 1870 to 1872 he was Attorney-General for Ireland. In 1872 Barry was appointed a Justice of the Queen's Bench and from 1883 to 1897 served as Lord Justice of the Irish Court of Appeal. Elrington Ball attributed his rise not only to his extraordinary legal ability, but also his immense personal popularity.

== Personal life ==
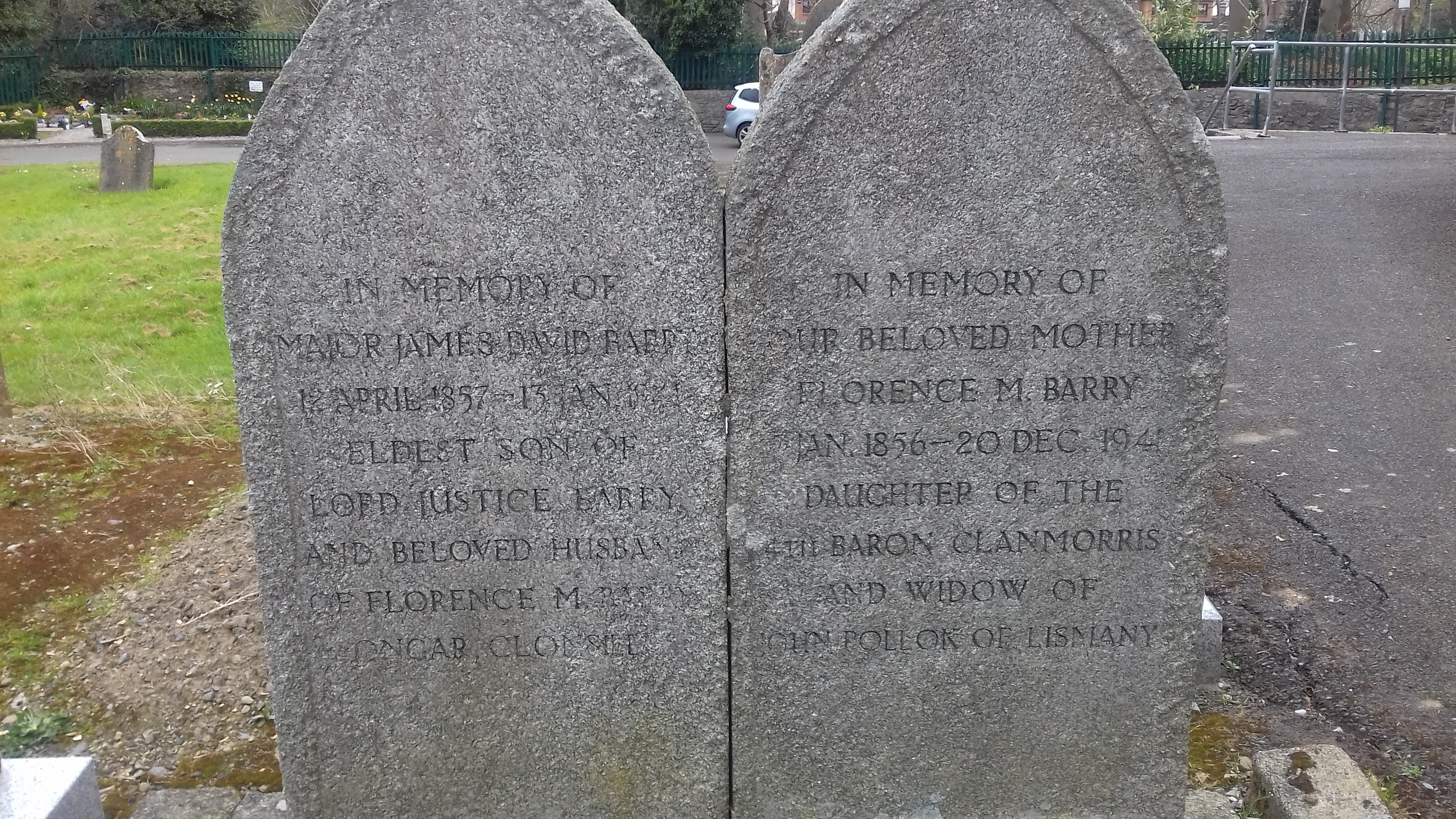
Tombstone of Major James David Barry, son of C. R. Barry

Barry married Kate, daughter of David and Catherine Fitzgerald of Dublin and sister of John David Fitzgerald, who became MP for Ennis and also a Justice of the Queen's Bench and later a Lord of Appeal in Ordinary. Sources are contradictory as to their children; some report only one son, Charles junior; others report another son, James David Barry. According to Thom's Directory, James David Barry J.P., was a soldier who served with the Royal Horse Artillery and was Aide-de-camp to Lords-Lieutenant of Ireland. Having been decorated for his service in the Boer War, he embarked with 1st Expeditionary Force in August 1914 with the rank of Major. His wife Florence was the daughter of the 4th Baron Clanmorris. The Major and his wife are buried at St Mary's church, Clonsilla, Fingal.

Kate's sister Emily married Denis Caulfield Heron, who like Barry held office as both Law Adviser to the Lord Lieutenant and Serjeant-at-law.

== Notes ==
Parliament of the United Kingdom
Preceded by John Maguire	Member of Parliament for Dungarvan; 1865–1868	Succeeded by Henry Matthews
Legal offices
Preceded by Henry Ormsby	Solicitor-General for Ireland; 1868–1870	Succeeded by Richard Dowse
Preceded by Edward Sullivan	Attorney-General for Ireland; 1870–1872	Succeeded by Richard Dowse
