= 1890 West Waterford by-election =

UK parliamentary by-election

The 1890 West Waterford by-election was a parliamentary by-election held for the United Kingdom House of Commons constituency of West Waterford on 24 February 1890. The vacancy arose because of the death of the sitting member, Douglas Pyne of the Irish Parliamentary Party. Pyne had disappeared off a boat in November 1888, and was presumed drowned.

Only one candidate was nominated, Alfred Webb of the Irish Parliamentary Party, who was therefore elected unopposed.
