= Henry Villiers-Stuart, 1st Baron Stuart de Decies =

British politician

Coat of arms of the Baron Stuart de Decies

Henry Villiers-Stuart, 1st Baron Stuart de Decies PC (8 June 1803 – 23 January 1874), was a British politician.

== Background and education ==
Born Henry Crichton-Stuart, in London, he was the eldest son of Lord Henry Crichton-Stuart, third son of John Stuart, 1st Marquess of Bute. His mother was Lady Gertrude Amilia, daughter and heiress of George Mason-Villiers, 2nd Earl Grandison. He was educated at Eton and Christ Church, Oxford. In 1822 he assumed by royal licence the surname of Villiers-Stuart in lieu of Crichton-Stuart.

== Political career ==
Stuart sat as Member of Parliament for County Waterford from 1826 to 1830 and for Banbury from 1830 to 1831. He was appointed the first ever Lord-Lieutenant of County Waterford in 1831, a post he held until his death, and was admitted to the Irish Privy Council in 1837.

In 1839, he was raised to the peerage as Baron Stuart de Decies, of Dromana within the Decies in the County of Waterford.

== Family ==
Lord Stuart de Decies was alleged to have married in 1826 Theresia Pauline Ott, both in London and under Scottish Law in Scotland. However, it was never established that Theresia was free to marry.

As a result, their son Henry Villiers-Stuart was considered illegitimate and was not allowed to succeed in the barony on his father's death. Consequently, the peerage became extinct on Lord Stuart de Decies's death in January 1874, aged 70. Theresia had died on 7 August 1867.

Parliament of the United Kingdom
Preceded by Richard Shapland Power; Lord George Beresford	Member of Parliament for County Waterford; 1826–1830; With: Richard Shapland Power	Succeeded by Richard Shapland Power; Lord George Beresford
Preceded by Arthur Charles Legge	Member of Parliament for Banbury; 1830–1831	Succeeded by John Easthope
Honorary titles
New office	Lord-Lieutenant of County Waterford; 1831–1874	Succeeded by Sir Richard Musgrave, Bt
Peerage of the United Kingdom
New creation	Baron Stuart de Decies; 1839–1874	Extinct
