= John Power (Irish MP) =

Politician, born 1816

John William Power (4 February 1816 – 12 May 1851), sometimes described as the 17th Baron Le Power and Coroghmore, was an Irish politician.

The son of Edmund Power, and stepson of Richard L. Shiel, Power was born in Castle Gurteen de la Poer. He stood in the 1837 Dungarvan by-election, and won the seat, as a Whig. In the 1837 UK general election, he instead stood in County Waterford, winning the seat without facing a contest. In 1840, he stood down by taking the office of the Chiltern Hundreds. Power also served as a deputy lieutenant and a magistrate.

== Horse Racing, Hunting and Valentine's Brook ==
Power was a keen rider to hounds and chasing along with his contemporary, the Marquis of Waterford. The pair were both stewards of the Kilkenny races as well as riding together in the Kildare hunt. They both entered horses in the 1840 Grand National, both taking the common practice of the time of riding their respective entrants.

Power also took a bet that he would be first to reach the wall, which marked the completion of half of the race and in doing so set out at a strong pace to lead. Although unreported at the time, the story grew in the years that followed of an unusual occurrence at the second brook by the canal side where Power's mount may have tried to refuse or run out. The horse corkscrewed over the obstacle hind legs first before the partnership continues to complete their bet and ultimately finish third in the race.

In the year's that followed, the story gained popularity to the point that reporters began referring to the obstacle as Valentine's Brook in the 1850s before becoming the official name of the fence today.

== Death ==
In May 1851 Power was the guarantor of a financial fund that was under investigation for embezzlement. Facing public humiliation rather than financial ruin, he fell into a deep state of depression and despite efforts from friends to prevent it, he took a pistol and shot himself.

Parliament of the United Kingdom
Preceded by Michael O'Loghlen	Member of Parliament for Dungarvan; Feb. 1837–July 1837	Succeeded by Cornelius O'Callaghan
Preceded by Richard Musgrave; William Villiers-Stuart	Member of Parliament for County Waterford; 1837–1840; With: William Villiers-Stuart	Succeeded by William Villiers-Stuart; Robert Carew
