= Lady Clodagh Anson =

Philanthropist, writer

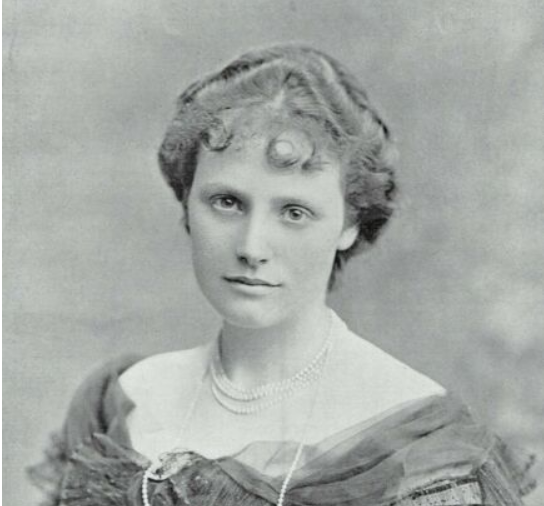
- Born: Lady Clodagh de la Poer Beresford; 6 August 1879; Westminster, England
- Died: 17 April 1957 (aged 77); Dungarvan, County Waterford
- Spouse: Claud Anson
- Father: John Henry de la Poer Beresford, 5th Marquess of Waterford
- Mother: Lady Blanche Elizabeth Adelaide Somerset

Lady Clodagh de la Poer Anson (née Beresford; 6 August 1879 – 17 April 1957) was an Anglo-Irish philanthropist, writer and aristocrat.

== Life ==
She was born Clodagh de la Poer Beresford to John Henry de la Poer Beresford, 5th Marquess of Waterford and Lady Blanche Elizabeth Adelaide Somerset on 6 August 1879. Her parents died before she was adult and she was put into the care of various family who ensured she was properly presented at court. She married Claud Anson, son of Thomas Anson, 2nd Earl of Lichfield, on 27 February 1901. They had three children.

When she married she moved to Texas where her husband had a ranch. But she stayed in close contact with Ireland and Britain, returning home often. She returned to Ireland after her eldest daughter was born and left her in Curraghmore for some months. The family soon moved to Ireland where they lived mostly at Ballysaggartmore House until the Irish War of Independence. Beresford moved to London until 1942. In 1931 Beresford published a book of memoirs which went to multiple printings. The purpose of the book was to raise money and awareness of the issue of homelessness. The book gives an insight into the last days of the Anglo-Irish aristocracy in Ireland. Her second book was for the slums of London where she set up and ran a shelter. She called them Book and Another Book. In 1942 Anson returned to live in Ireland. She died on 17 April 1957 at age 77. Her epitaph at Ardmore reads She never failed to help those in trouble.

== Bibliography ==
- Book: Discreet Memoirs (1931)
- Another Book (1937)
- Victorian Days (1957)
