= Henry Villiers-Stuart =

British soldier, clergyman and Egyptologist

Henry Windsor Villiers-Stuart (13 September 1827 – 12 October 1895), was a British soldier, clergyman, politician, Egyptologist, and author.

== Parentage ==
He was the son of Henry Villiers-Stuart, 1st and last Baron Stuart de Decies, son of Lord Henry Stuart and his wife, Lady Gertrude Amelia, daughter of George Mason-Villiers, 2nd Earl Grandison. His paternal great-grandfather was John Stuart, 1st Marquess of Bute, son of Prime Minister John Stuart, 3rd Earl of Bute. Henry Villiers-Stuart had a younger sister, Pauline, later Lady Wheeler Cuffe (died 5 July 1895).

His mother was Theresia Pauline (née Ott), an Austrian Roman Catholic from Vienna. His parents married on 12 January 1826 in a Roman Catholic service at St James's, Spanish Place, London, and also under Scottish law, but there was uncertainty over whether Theresia was free to marry. As a result of this confusion the younger Henry Villiers-Stuart, after the death of his father in 1874, was unable to establish his claim to the peerage and become the 2nd Baron Stuart de Decies. Theresia's married name became Villiers-Stuart, and, as a result of her marriage, she was styled as Baroness Stuart de Decies on 10 March 1839. She died on 7 August 1867 at Wiesbaden, Hesse, Germany and was interred at Villierstown, County Waterford, Ireland.

== Career ==
Villiers-Stuart served in the Austrian Imperial Army from 1844 to 1846. He was in the British Army from 1846 to 1847 as an ensign in the 20th Regiment of Foot. He afterwards attended University College, Durham and took his BA at Durham University in 1850, graduating with a second-class degree in Classics. In 1849 and still an undergraduate he took his first journey to Egypt, with the intention of visiting sites mentioned in the Bible.

=== 1850–1885 ===
He was ordained in the Church of England and served as Vicar of Bulkington, Warwickshire from 1852 to 1855, and of Napton from 1855 to 1871, when he resigned Holy Orders to pursue a political career and was successfully returned to Parliament for County Waterford in 1873, representing the Liberal Party. His father died the following year and he then resigned his seat so that he could pursue his claim to the barony of Stuart de Decies. However, Stuart-Villiers was unable to satisfactorily claim that his parents were legally married and was not allowed to assume the title. He was again elected to the House of Commons for County Waterford in 1880, a seat he held until 1885. While in parliament he was upfront about the economic difficulties faced by Irish landowners of his class. In 1880, he explained to his colleagues in the House of Commons that he had taken out a loan so he could afford to employ 200 men.

Travels and Egyptology

Stuart travelled extensively, and published many accounts of his wanderings, notably Adventures amid the Equatorial Forests and Rivers of South America (1891). He was in South America in 1858, in Jamaica in 1881, and he made several journeys through Egypt, and published various works on ancient and modern Egypt. After the British intervention in Egypt concluded with victory at the Battle of Tell El Kebir in 1882 he was sent by the British government to report on the conditions of the people in that country, and produced several books on the topic, including Egypt after the War, which received the special recognition of Lord Dufferin, and his reports were published as a parliamentary blue-book.

The Durham University Journal noted in their obituary of Villiers-Stuart that The Funeral Tent of an Egyptian Queen was one of his more popular books. In this book he recalled a journey taken in Egypt in 1879, including a visit to Deir el-Bahari, where he translated some of the hieroglyphics on the tomb of Ramesses I. He also visited a canopy amidst the royal mummeries, recently discovered by Emile Brugsch, that formed the funeral tent of Queen Isi em Kheb, the mother-in-law of Shishak, and inspired the title of the book. He was a member of the Society of Biblical Archaeology. He also joined the Egypt Exploration Fund (EEF) and was concerned about the damage to Egyptian monuments. Like founding member of the EEF Amelia Edwards he noted with alarm how quickly sites were being destroyed. In the winter of 1882 he discovered the alabaster altar and basins in Niuserre's Sun Temple at Abu Ghurab, a discovery that Edwards believed to be very significant.

=== 1885–1895 ===
He contested East Cork at the 1885 election as an Independent candidate but was unsuccessful, losing out to William John Lane of the Irish Parliamentary Party. Villiers-Stuart was appointed High Sheriff of County Waterford for 1889.

== Personal life ==
Villiers-Stuart married Mary Power, the daughter of Ambrose Power, Archdeacon of Lismore, in 1865. They had five sons and four daughters. He died in October 1895, aged 68, after falling and drowning off Villierstown Quay, near his residence at Dromana, Waterford, having slipped while attempting to enter his boat. His wife survived him by twelve years, dying in September 1907. His youngest son, Patrick Villiers-Stuart, married the author and painter Constance Fielden.

Through his daughter Patricia, he was a great-grandfather of Falcon Stuart.

== Publications ==
- Eve of the Deluge. London, 1851.
- Nile Gleanings: concerning the ethnology, history and art of Ancient Egypt as revealed by Egyptian paintings and bas-reliefs. London, 1879.
- The Funeral Tent of an Egyptian Queen. London, 1882.
- Egypt after the War: being the narrative of a tour of inspection (undertaken last Autumn) including experiences among the natives, with descriptions of their homes and habits. London, 1883.
- Adventures amidst the Equatorial Forests and Rivers of South America. London, 1891

== See also ==
- Marquess of Bute

== Notes ==
Parliament of the United Kingdom
| Preceded by Sir John Esmonde, Bt; Edmond de la Poer | Member of Parliament for County Waterford; 1873–1874; With: Sir John Esmonde, Bt | Succeeded by Sir John Esmonde, Bt; Lord Charles Beresford |
| Preceded by Lord Charles Beresford; James Delahunty | Member of Parliament for County Waterford; 1880–1885; With: John Aloysius Blake 1880–1884; Patrick Joseph Power 1884–1885 | Constituency abolished |
