= John Beresford, 5th Marquess of Waterford =

Irish peer and Conservative politician

The Most Honourable The Marquess of Waterford KP PC DL
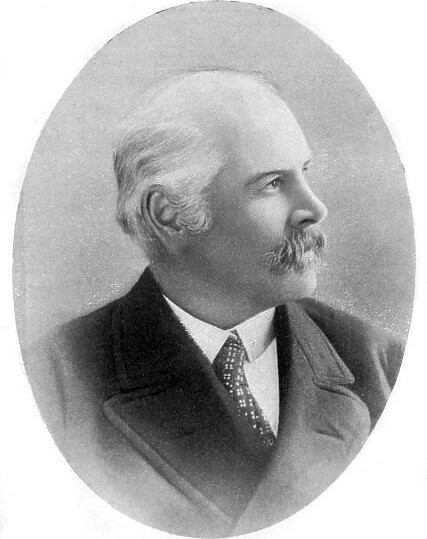

Master of the Buckhounds
- In office 27 June 1885 – 28 January 1886
- Monarch: Victoria
- Prime Minister: The Marquess of Salisbury
- Preceded by: The Earl of Cork
- Succeeded by: The Lord Suffield

Personal details
- Born: 21 May 1844
- Died: 23 October 1895 (aged 51)
- Party: Conservative
- Spouse(s): Florence Vivian (m. 1873; died 1874) Lady Blanche Somerset (m. 1874)
- Children: 4, including Henry Beresford, 6th Marquess of Waterford
- Parent(s): John Beresford, 4th Marquess of Waterford; Christiana Leslie

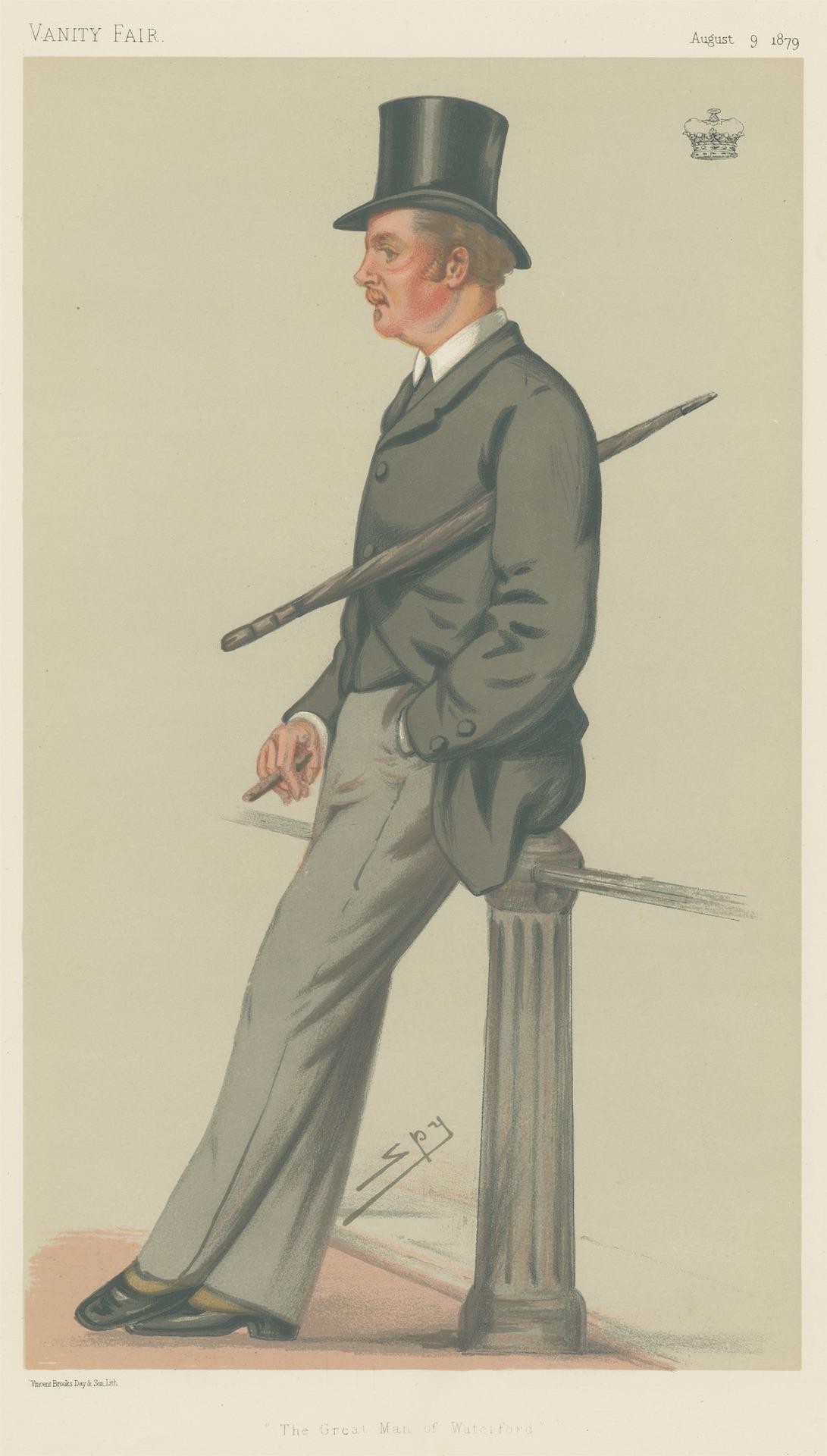
"The Great Man of Waterford". Caricature by Spy published in Vanity Fair in 1879.

John Henry de la Poer Beresford, 5th Marquess of Waterford, KP, PC, DL (21 May 1844 – 23 October 1895), styled Earl of Tyrone from 1859 to 1866, was an Irish peer and Conservative politician. He served as Master of the Buckhounds under Lord Salisbury from 1885 to 1886.

== Background ==
Beresford was the eldest son of John Beresford, 4th Marquess of Waterford, by his wife Christiana Leslie, daughter of Colonel Charles Leslie and sister of Sir John Leslie, 1st Baronet, of Castle Leslie, Glaslough, County Monaghan. He was the elder brother of Lord Charles Beresford, Lord William Beresford, VC and Lord Marcus Beresford.

Beresford was an avid sportsman: as with the rest of his family, he was very fond of hunting, racing and shooting. In his youth he rode to hounds with his infamous uncle, the 3rd Marquess of Waterford. He was educated at Eton, after which he was commissioned into the Household cavalry. In 1859, he became known as the Earl of Tyrone after his father succeeded to the marquessate.

== Career ==
Lord Tyrone gained the rank of Captain in the 1st Life Guards. It was said he was "one of the handsomest officers that ever wore the uniform of the Household Brigade".

Lord Waterford was returned to Parliament for County Waterford in 1865, a seat he held until the following year, when he succeeded his father in the marquessate and took his seat in the House of Lords. In 1868 he was made a Knight of the Order of St Patrick. He was appointed Lord Lieutenant of Waterford in 1874, which he remained until his death, and was admitted to the Irish Privy Council in 1879. In 1885 he was sworn of the British Privy Council and appointed Master of the Buckhounds under Lord Salisbury, a post he held until the fall of the Conservative administration in early 1886.

== In humour ==
W. S. Gilbert refers to Lord Waterford as "reckless and rollicky" in Colonel Calverley's song "If You Want A Receipt For That Popular Mystery" from the Gilbert and Sullivan opera Patience.

== Family ==
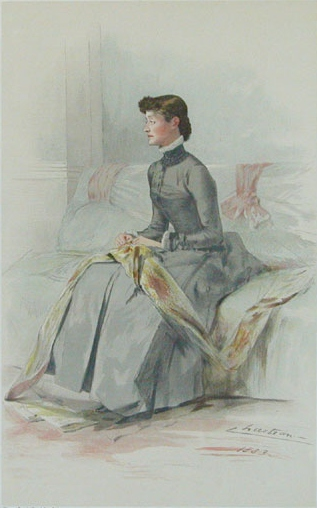
Blanche, Marchioness of Waterford, September 1883

Lord Waterford eloped with Florence Grosvenor Rowley, wife of John Vivian and married her on 9 August 1872. She died on 4 April 1873, along with her stillborn child. He married secondly, Lady Blanche Somerset, daughter of Henry Somerset, 8th Duke of Beaufort, on 21 July 1874. The second Lady Waterford suffered from a severe illness which left her an invalid. She had a special carriage designed to carry her around the estate at Curraghmore. Lord Waterford and his second wife had four children:

- Henry de la Poer Beresford, 6th Marquess of Waterford (1875–1911)
- Lady Mary Beresford (1877–1877), died in infancy
- Lady Susan de la Poer Beresford, twin sister of Lady Mary (1877–1947), married Major Hon. Hugh Dawnay, son of Hugh Dawnay, 8th Viscount Downe and had issue, including Maj-Gen Sir David Dawnay
- Lady Clodagh Beresford (1879–1957), married Hon. Claud Anson, son of Thomas Anson, 2nd Earl of Lichfield and had issue

He owned 66,000 acres including 39,000 in Waterford and 26,000 in Wicklow.

Lord Waterford committed suicide in October 1895, aged 51, and was succeeded in the marquessate by his only son, Henry. Many national newspapers expressed their sorrow at Lord Waterford's suicide, especially given his position in society.

Parliament of the United Kingdom
Preceded by Sir John Esmonde, Bt; Walter Talbot	Member of Parliament for County Waterford; 1865–1866; With: Sir John Esmonde, Bt	Succeeded by Sir John Esmonde, Bt; Edmond de la Poer
Political offices
Preceded by The Earl of Cork	Master of the Buckhounds; 1885–1886	Succeeded by The Lord Suffield
Honorary titles
Preceded by Sir Richard Musgrave, Bt	Lord Lieutenant of Waterford; 1874–1895	Succeeded by The Duke of Devonshire
Peerage of Ireland
Preceded by John Beresford	Marquess of Waterford; 1866–1895	Succeeded by Henry Beresford
