= J. J. O'Shee =

Irish politician

James John O'Shee or Shee (3 November 1866 – 1 January 1946) usually known as J. J. O'Shee, was an Irish nationalist politician, solicitor, labour activist and Member of Parliament (MP) in the House of Commons of the United Kingdom of Great Britain and Ireland representing the constituency of West Waterford from 1895 until 1918. Elected as an Anti-Parnellite Irish National Federation member of the Irish Parliamentary Party he was one of the more socially radical members of the party. He co-founded and was secretary from 1894 of the Irish Land and Labour Association

== Origins ==
O'Shee was born as John James Shee on 3 November 1866 at Newtown, near Carrick-on-Suir Co. Tipperary as the youngest of four sons of John Shee, a farmer of good means, of Newtown Upper near the hamlet of Faugheen, north of Carrick-on-Suir and his wife Marrianne (née Britton). He had five sisters all of whom became nuns. He attended the local national school, completing his education at Rockwell College and University College Dublin. He first served as a law apprentice with James O'Sullivan in Carraig-on-Suir before qualify as a solicitor in 1890. He subsequently opened his own practice in the town, establishing a branch office later in Clonmel. Shee changed his name in 1900 to O'Shee.

== Political activist ==
While still an apprentice he became politically active and won a considerable reputation as a public speaker and man of action. In 1894 in alliance with D. D. Sheehan he co-founded the Irish Land and Labour Association (ILLA), chaired by Sheehan with O'Shee as secretary. They campaigned for radical changes in land and labour laws, in particular the granting of smallholdings to rural labourers. The Irish Party leaders suspected this independent organisation from the beginning. A year later in 1895 O’Shee was elected as an anti-Parnellite to represent the constituency of West Waterford at Westminster, which seat he held until 1918.

From 1898 Sheehan put all his energies into building up the ILLA, which spread across Munster and by 1904 peaked 144 branches. Although Sheehan was a Parnellite when elected MP for Mid-Cork in 1901, the Sheehan-O'Shee's alliance reflected how the Parnell split could be bridged by seeking co-operation in an independent organisation. Sheehan speaking of O'Shee wrote that “ we co-operated heartily in and out of Parliament in making the Labour organisation a real and vital force, and our relations for many useful years, – were of the most cordial and kindly kind". The Irish Party leadership on the other hand, refused to consider direct Parliamentary representation to the Land and Labour Association, an indication of the middle-class determination with maintaining its hold over national politics.

== Party politics ==
With the introduction of the Land Purchase (Ireland) Act 1903 won by William O'Brien MP, O'Shee achieved some notable successes in negotiating land purchase, the Bessborough (Ponsonby) estates being remembered as a particular triumph. However the leaders of the Irish Parliamentary Party (IPP), John Dillon and Joseph Devlin strongly opposed the O'Shee-Sheehan ILLA alliance, particularly after Sheehan grew closer to the dissident O'Brien when he was alienated from the party in 1904 after his policy of conciliation was rejected by its leaders. O'Shee aligned himself with the leadership of John Redmond.

Dillon decided to intervene and set about splitting the ILLA in 1905, forming a new "original" ILLA group, strictly subservient to the Party, under the loyal "Redmonite" O'Shee. Purpose: – to confine Sheehan's movement, otherwise "the whole of Munster will be poisoned and no seat safe on vacancy". O’Shee's organisation was forthwith the only one recognised by the Party and permitted to attend Irish Party or United Irish League conventions. O'Shee was mainly supported by the ILLA branches in Tipperary and Wexford. Sheehan's stronghold was in Cork, acting as O'Brien's backbone organisation, Kerry and Limerick were divided. Attempts at a reunion were thwarted by O'Shee's insistence that Sheehan must step down. In the long run the Party's intervention weakened Sheehan's renamed LLA group, and the labour movement in general.

== Multiple career ==
O'Shee found it difficult initially to combine his responsibilities as a solicitor with those of his political career, and was in fact reprimanded by Redmond in 1903 for his failing to attend parliament regularly. This was alleviated when his brother became a solicitor, joined his practise and took over much of O'Shee's workload. This enabled him to extend his practise across Kilkenny, Waterford and Tipperary synergising it with supporting negotiations in land purchase. His legal knowledge also proved valuable in his parliamentary work on social legislation.

He was one of the few members of the IPP who took a singular course in many matters. In 1913 he supported a woman's suffrage bill, despite instructions to vote against it (which Redmond did). At the outbreak of the Great War he actively recruited in support of Ireland's involvement in the war, but after the 1916 Rising he urged that a more nationalistic approach be taken. At the outset of the Irish Convention he joined Arthur Lynch and four other MPs in signing a declaration that no partition based settlement would be acceptable. He regarded the idea of separation as absurd because Ireland was dependent on the British market.

== After years ==
He defended his seat in the 1918 general election, where he was defeated by Sinn Féin's Cathal Brugha in the West Waterford.

On 1 June 1921 O'Shee married Anne Mary (Nancy), daughter of Thomas B. Naughton, farmer of Killaghy Castle, Mullinahone, County Tipperary. They had two sons and four daughters. Nancy's family was like O'Shee's fairly affluent rural middle class farmers and professionals. Among Nancy's maternal first cousins included Francis Crean and Maj. Dr. Thomas Joseph Crean. She was also a second cousin of Micheal Heffernan. Her mothers family was also related to Charles Kickham.

O'Shee continued to practise law in Clonmel until he retired in 1935. He moved some time later from his home Oak Ville house, on the edge of Clonmel (Which is now the site of a Dunnes Stores) to Pembroke Park, Ballsbridge, Dublin, where he died on 1 January 1946.

== Notes ==
Parliament of the United Kingdom
Preceded by Alfred Webb	Member of Parliament for West Waterford; 1895 – 1918	Succeeded by Cathal Brugha
