= Lord George Beresford =

Anglo-Irish soldier, courtier and Tory politician

The Right Honourable Lord George Beresford GCH PC

Comptroller of the Household
- In office 28 July 1812 – 24 November 1830
- Monarchs: George III; George IV; William IV
- Prime Minister: The Earl of Liverpool; George Canning; The Viscount Goderich; The Duke of Wellington
- Preceded by: Lord George Thynne
- Succeeded by: Lord Robert Grosvenor

Personal details
- Born: 12 February 1781
- Died: 26 October 1839 (aged 58)
- Party: Tory
- Spouse: Harriet Schutz (d. 1860)
- Education: Eton College

Military service
- Allegiance: United Kingdom
- Branch/service: British Army
- Years of service: 1793–1839
- Rank: Lieutenant-General
- Commands: 71st Regiment of Foot; 2nd Dragoon Guards; 8th Cavalry Brigade
- Battles/wars: Napoleonic Wars; Hundred Days

Lieutenant-General Lord George Thomas de la Poer Beresford, GCH, PC (12 February 1781 – 26 October 1839) was an Anglo-Irish soldier, courtier and politician. He served as Comptroller of the Household from 1812 to 1830.

== Background ==
Beresford was the fourth and thus youngest son of George Beresford, 1st Marquess of Waterford, by his wife Elizabeth Monck, daughter of Henry Monck, Esq. of Charleville, and the former Lady Isabella Bentinck (second daughter of Henry Bentinck, 1st Duke of Portland).

Henry Beresford, 2nd Marquess of Waterford and Lord John Beresford were his elder brothers and Lord Beresford and Sir John Beresford his half-brothers.

== Military career ==
Beresford was appointed a cornet in the 13th Light Dragoons in April 1794, a lieutenant in the 111th Regiment of Foot in July 1794 and a captain in the 124th Regiment of Foot on 24 September 1794, from which he exchanged into the 88th Regiment of Foot on 29 July 1796. As a captain he served two years and eight months in the East Indies. He was promoted to the majority of the 6th Dragoon Guards on 3 December 1800 and to the lieutenant-colonelcy of Dillon's Regiment on 24 September 1803, from which he was removed to the 71st Regiment of Foot on 16 August 1804 and then to the 2nd Dragoon Guards on 30 July 1807. He was granted brevet rank as a colonel on 1 January 1812 and promoted to major-general 4 June 1814.

== Political career ==
Beresford was returned to parliament for Londonderry in 1802. In 1812 he was returned for Coleraine, sworn of the Privy Council and appointed Comptroller of the Household under Lord Liverpool. In 1814 he was elected to parliament for County Waterford. He did not sit in parliament between 1826 and 1830 but nonetheless continued as Comptroller of the Household. He was once again returned to parliament for County Waterford in March 1830 and remained as Comptroller of the Household until the Whigs came to power under Lord Grey in late 1830. He continued to represent County Waterford in parliament until the 1831 general election.

== Family ==
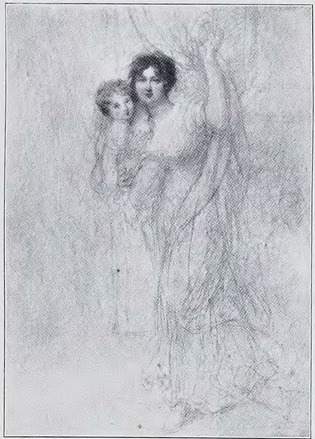
Harriet Schutz Beresford and her daughter Elizabeth Harriet Georgina portrait by Richard Cosway

Beresford married Harriet Schutz, daughter of John Bacon Schutz, Esq. of Gillingham Hall, Suffolk, on 22 November 1808. They had three daughters:

- Elizabeth Harriet Georgina (1810–1889), married Admiral Henry Eden.
- Harriet Susan Isabella (d. 1859), married George Dunbar, MP for Belfast.
- Caroline Susan Catherine (d. 1866), married Hon. Edward Kenyon, of Maesfen, Shropshire.

Beresford died in October 1839, aged 58. Lady George Beresford, who was noted as an amateur painter, died in April 1860.

Parliament of the United Kingdom
Preceded by Hon. Charles Stewart; Sir George Hill, Bt	Member of Parliament for Londonderry; 1802–1812; With: Hon. Charles Stewart	Succeeded by Hon. Charles Stewart; Hon. William Ponsonby
Preceded by John Beresford	Member of Parliament for Coleraine; 1812–1814	Succeeded by Sir John Beresford, Bt
Preceded by Sir William Beresford; Richard Power	Member of Parliament for County Waterford; 1814–1826; With: Richard Shapland Power	Succeeded by Richard Power; Hon. Henry Villiers-Stuart
Preceded by Richard Power; Hon. Henry Villiers-Stuart	Member of Parliament for County Waterford; 1830–1831; With: Richard Shapland Power to March 1830; Daniel O'Connell from March 1830	Succeeded by Sir Richard Musgrave, Bt; Robert Power
Political offices
Preceded by Hon. George Thynne	Comptroller of the Household; 1812–1830	Succeeded by Lord Robert Grosvenor
Military offices
Preceded by The Viscount Combermere	Colonel of the 3rd (The King's Own); Regiment of (Light) Dragoons; 1829–1839	Succeeded by Lord Charles Manners
