= Patrick Power (Liberal politician) =

Irish politician (1785–1835)

Patrick Power (died 25 August 1835) was Whig Party Westminster MP for County Waterford from the 1835 general election until his death. He stood for election with the backing of Daniel O'Connell, who supported Repeal of the Union, and was returned unopposed with Sir Richard Musgrave. He was a justice of the peace, and lived in Bellevue, County Kilkenny. He was the younger brother of Nicholas Mahon Power. He was married to Mary Snow; they had four sons and one daughter.
