= Wright baronets =

Set index for Wright baronets

There have been six baronetcies created for persons with the surname Wright, three in the Baronetage of England, two in the Baronetage of Great Britain and one in the Baronetage of the United Kingdom. All creations are extinct.

- Wright baronets of Dennington (1646): see Sir Benjamin Wright, 1st Baronet (died c. 1670). Title granted by Charles I late in the First English Civil War, to the uncle of the 1st Baronet of the 1661 creation.
- Wright baronets of Dagenham (1660)
- Wright baronets of Cranham Hall (1661)
- Wright baronets of Venice (1772)
- Wright baronets of Carolside (1772)
- Wright baronets of Swansea (1920)
