= Sindh prize property =

British colonial war bounty

The Sindh prize property refers in the properties seized by the British Indian Empire in the First Anglo-Afghan War. In accordance with British naval prize legislation, prize money consisted of a monetary reward paid by a belligerent state, normally to the crew of a ship. Captures made by armies, called Booty of War, were distinct from naval prize monies and were made for a specific capture, often the storming of a city; awards of this nature did not set a precedent for other military captures in the same war and did not require adjudication by a prize court. Thus, in the case of the Sindh prize, the Commander in Chief ordered that "all horses, mules and bullocks captured in the fort of Ghuznee" be put up for sale by auction. On 26 July 1839, Lieutenant General John Keane, 1st Baron Keane was nominated a Prize Agent to the army of the Indus, with invitations extended to Shah Shujah Durrani to participate in the selection of other agents. Prize rolls were prepared in triplicate and forwarded to the relevant authorities.

The sword of the Governor of Ghazni in the hands of the Prize Agents, to be sold by auction for the benefit of the captors, was claimed as a right by John Keane. The delays caused by this dispute extended to other properties and in 1848 Allen's Indian Mail reported that "whole of the arms, Jewellery & c. captured at Haidrabad (Sindh)" had been lying undisposed of in the Bombay General Treasury for upward of three years. Allen's Indian Mail also reports that the goods, valued at seven laks of rupees and filling about twenty-seven boxes, were sent from Bombay by the steamer Lady Mary Wood to the Pointe de Galle, and from there sent on a second steamer to Calcutta.
