= Edward Keane =

Edward Keane may refer to:

- Edward Keane (British Army officer) (1785–1866), colonel who served during Napoleonic Wars
- Edward Vivien Harvey Keane (1844–1904), Australian engineer, businessman and politician
- Edward Keane (actor) (1884–1959), American bit part performer in hundreds of films
