= Murder of Sir Richard Sutton =

2021 murder in Dorset, England

Sir Richard Lexington Sutton
- Born: Richard Lexington Sutton; England
- Died: 7 April 2021 (aged 83); Moorhill Estate, Higher Langham, near Gillingham, Dorset
- Cause of death: Stabbing
- Known for: 9th Baronet of the Sutton baronets of Norwood Park Landowner Hotelier
- Predecessor: Sir Robert Lexington Sutton, 8th Baronet (1897–1981)
- Successor: Sir David Robert Sutton, 10th Baronet (born 1960)
- Partner: Lady Fiamma Ferrari (1959–2000) Anne Schreiber (early 2000s–2021)
- Children: 2, including Sir David Robert Sutton, 10th Baronet (26 February 1960)
- Parent(s): Sir Robert Lexington Sutton, 8th Baronet (1897–1981) Gwyneth Sutton
- Relatives: Sir Richard Sutton, 4th Baronet James Anthony Sutton (born 1940) (brother)
- Family: Sutton baronets of Norwood Park (1772)
- Website: https://www.srsl.co.uk/

On 7 April 2021, 83-year-old Sir Richard Sutton was killed by his step-son, 35-year-old Thomas Schreiber. Sutton was stabbed several times by Schreiber in his home on his Moorhill estate in Higher Langham, near Gillingham, Dorset. During the attack on Sutton, Schreiber also attacked his mother, Anne Schreiber, stabbing her several times. She survived but was paralysed by the attack.

On 17 December 2021, he was convicted of the murder of Sutton and attempted murder of his mother Anne, and on 20 December 2021, was sentenced to life, with a minimum term of 36 years imprisonment.

== Background ==
=== Sir Richard Sutton ===
Richard Lexington Sutton was born on 27 April 1937. He was educated at Stowe School. The son of Sir Robert Sutton, 8th Baronet, he succeeded his father as the 9th Baronet, after his death in 1981. The Sutton baronetcy title has origins from the reign of King James I. The Sutton ancestry can be dated back to William the Conqueror. The Lord Lyon pub in Berkshire was named after a Sutton family winning racehorse, that in 1866, won the 2000 Guinea Stakes at Newmarket Racecourse.

On 2 March 1959, he married Lady Fiamma Ferrari and the couple had a son, David Robert Sutton (born 1960) and a daughter, Caroline Victoria Sutton (born 1965). Sutton had five grandchildren. Sutton and Ferrari separated in 2000, although remained on good terms. After this time, he met his partner, Anne Schreiber, with the Schreiber and Sutton families having both previously been friends.

Sutton owned a variety of land, with extensive estates, including the Benham Estate in Berkshire and Stainton Estate in Lincolnshire. He also owned hotels and other property within central London, including owning the freehold of the five-star Sheraton Grand London Park Lane and the Athenaeum Hotel in Mayfair. Sutton owned smaller venues in Bath, Cheltenham and Windsor.

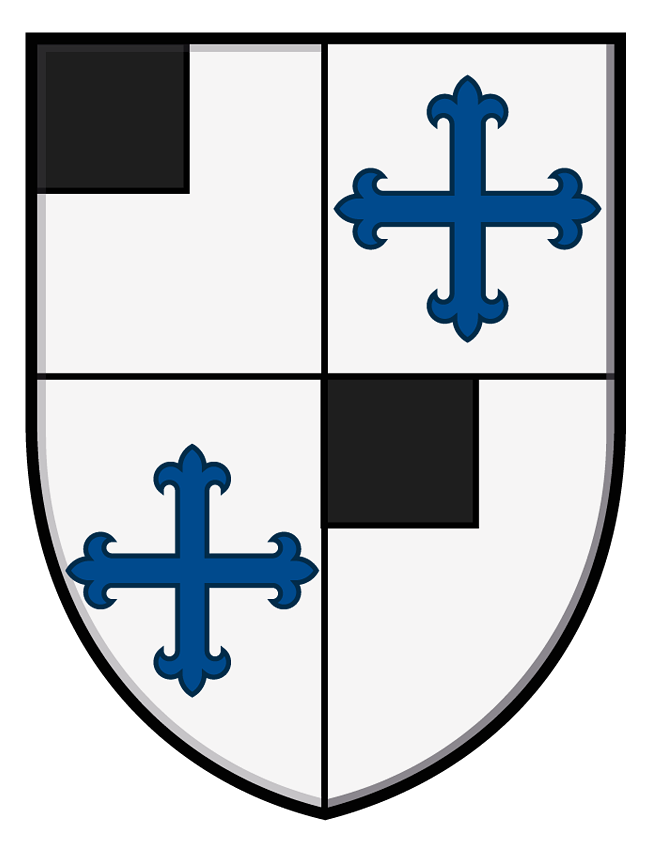
The Coat of arms of the Sutton baronets of Norwood Park (1772)

The principal estate that Sutton owned was near Newbury, at Benham Park. This land included 6,000 acres, being acquired by Sutton's great-grandfather, Sir Richard Sutton, 4th Baronet. The Georgian mansion by the River Kennet was enlarged, with the original design being made by Henry Holland, set amongst parkland laid out by Capability Brown. After Sutton inherited his title, the house, with provision of 30 rooms, was sold in 1982, alongside 140 acres of land, for approximately £1 million (£4,352,294.15 in 2023). It was leased as an office space.

In 2014, Sutton purchased the Moorhill estate for £1.4 million.

In 2020, the estimated Sutton fortune was £301 million - up by £83 million from the previous year, making Sutton number 435 in the Sunday Times Rich List in 2020. Previously, in the Sunday Times Rich List in 2004, Sutton had ranked 321, with an estimated fortune of £120 million. This slipped from ranking 279 the previous year.

After the murder of Sutton, his son Sir David Sutton succeeded as the 10th Baronet. Sutton's brother James Anthony Sutton (born 1940), became the new heir.

Sutton was described by his family and the community as 'warm', 'very compassionate' and 'generous'.

=== Anne Schreiber ===
Anne Schreiber, a Danish-born physiotherapist, owns a clinic in Milborne Port, a village in the Sherborne area of Dorset.

According to friends, Anne, then aged 18, was the nanny of David Schreiber and his first wife's children. David, a translator with a military background, fell for Anne and on leaving his first wife, the pair married in 1982. They had three children together, including, Louisa (born 1980/1981), Rose (born January 1986) and their youngest, Thomas. Those who knew the family stated that Anne and David 'poured love and affection onto Schreiber and his two older sisters'. They lived in a Grade II listed farmhouse in Stalbridge Weston, Dorset, nine miles away from the Moorhill estate.

David was described as 'charismatic and theatrical', however, was a 'problem drinker' and he was considered a 'semi-functional alcoholic'. This included often threatening to kill himself and drunkenly discharging guns outside his farmhouse. At one stage, David was declared bankrupt and also became depressed.

Anne separated from David in around 2002/2003, with part of the reason being his alcoholism. It was around the same time that Sutton's relationship with his wife also broke down, with Lady Fiamma returning to her native Italy and starting a new relationship. After separating from David, Sutton invited Anne and her children, Thomas and Rose, to move into his home at his £2m Moorhill estate.

Sutton also let David move into a cottage on the estate, suggesting the move could be alongside an agreement to go into rehab. David refused the offer and died on 7 April 2013, after suffering 'severe drink problems', that included liver damage. He also suffered from Korsakoff Syndrome, a chronic memory disorder.

=== Thomas Schreiber ===
Thomas David A Schreiber was born in October 1986 to Anne and David Schreiber. He was born very prematurely - it was said that he was so tiny that he was able to fit into his father's palm.

As a child, Schreiber was considered to have an uncontrollable temper, which would present itself in circumstances that were out of context.

Following the end of his parents marriage in 2002, aged 16, Schreiber, who was incredibly close with his father, took sides with him, after Anne and Sutton started a relationship. He was described as harbouring a "significant and sustained feeling of resentment towards both his mother and Sir Richard". He believed that his father had been badly treated by Anne and Sutton, with Schreiber not being able to "come to terms with his mother setting up home with Sutton", being affected by the 'complete hell' of the separation.

In his late teens, Schreiber attended school and college in Denmark, then moving to London to study music technology. It was here that he DJ'd and collected vinyl records, whilst moving between jobs. In 2016, he and his then-girlfriend moved to Australia, however, on the end of the relationship, he returned to the UK, moving into the Moorhill estate in January 2019. This was only meant to be for a few weeks.

Since a teenager, Schreiber had struggled with low self-esteem, with a history of 'major depressive disorder and alcohol misuse'. It was also reported that he may have had attention deficit hyperactivity disorder, which can lead to impulsive actions. In March 2019, a therapist found him to be a 'deeply hurt man' and a 'lost child' who 'felt abandoned by his parents', 'financially imprisoned by Sutton', with alcohol exacerbating his problems. During the same month, Schreiber attended a residential course about dealing with trauma and addiction. It is here that he was assessed and it was established he was an alcoholic. Despite this assessment and a 'long history of alcohol abuse', with a habit of drinking alone, Schreiber would not accept he was an alcoholic.

In March 2021, Schreiber was prescribed antidepressants, but did not take them.

During his adult life, Schreiber had moved from job to job, never settling on a 'proper career'. From the age of 18, Schreiber had 35 jobs. He was an aspiring artist, however, believed his art was not taken seriously by his family.

== Build-up to the attacks ==
Schreiber felt he was treated differently by Sutton and Anne compared with his sisters, in particular, in relation to money. This was despite him being given a monthly allowance of £1,000 and £100,000 towards a house payment.

In terms of violence within the family, Schreiber had been violent to Anne during the summer of 2019, where he punched her and pulled her hair, after she had called him a 'leech'.

Schreiber had initially been violent to Sutton during Christmas 2019, where, in retaliation to a missed punch by Sutton, Schreiber punched him back during a fight, after Schreiber refused to drive the family home after a day at Wincanton Racecourse. The punch put Sutton on the ground, leaving him with a black eye.

In November 2020, Schreiber punched one of his sisters during an argument about the inheritance of a chandelier, leading Sutton to break a walking stick across his back. He later described this as a 'watershed moment', with this seeing him close himself off from his family, describing being 'rock bottom'. He stated that he had suicidal thoughts 'day and night', feeling that his family hated him and that he was a 'failure like his father'.

Schreiber claimed during the COVID lockdown, that he had begun to feel trapped. He stated that 'at times' he hated Sutton and expressed hope he would die of COVID-19, however, stated that at times, he loved Sutton.

Approximately a month before the attack, Schreiber texted a friend, saying "I want them to suffer. I contemplate murdering them all morning, day and night".

== Incident ==
On April 6, the night before the attacks, Schreiber searched 'how to overcome deep-seated desires for revenge' online. Schreiber sent a message to his sister, Rose, reminding her of her father's death, describing him as her 'real father' and not the one who 'bought' her, adding 'cupboard love' ('cupboard love' is defined as "affection that is feigned in order to obtain something") to the message.

On the evening of April 7, the only people present at the address were Sutton, Anne and Schreiber. Schreiber later stated that in the morning on that day, he had visited his father's grave at The Parish Church of St Mary in Stalbridge, on what was the eighth anniversary of his father's death. After visiting the grave, Schreiber then spent the afternoon working on an abstract painting in a makeshift studio in the snooker room of the house, before he had chatted with Sutton about his late father. Intending to toast the anniversary of his father's death, Schreiber poured himself a glass of wine.

It is believed that the attacks on April 7 took place around 18:30 BST, as on examination of the property on April 8, police discovered a landline that was off its hook, with the running time showing the handset had been away from the receiver since just after that time. Schreiber stated that when Anne returned from visiting the grave, she entered the office where the two were sat, telling Schreiber he was drunk, "just like your father". Schreiber retorted that he was not drunk (although it was later believed at the time of the attacks, he was three times the drink-drive limit, having had large gin and tonics during the day whilst painting, with Schreiber later describing himself as "tipsy but not drunk"), with Anne storming off out the room. Schreiber followed her, punching her in the arm or the back.

Anne was the only eye-witness to the attacks and her account was taken at the end of June 2021, due to medical advice around her injuries. She had fleeting memories of the incident, but described how she was in the kitchen at the sink, with her back to the door. On hearing shouting and noise, Anne saw Schreiber in the kitchen, holding a knife. Anne described how Schreiber's eyes were “almost frightening to look at because they looked terribly, terribly determined” and that he appeared “very, very unusual, very, very out of control”. Schreiber lifted the knife up, before stabbing her several times. Schreiber later stated that a voice in his head had shouted 'attack, attack', to which he had picked up the knife and started stabbing Anne.

There are differing events as to what happened next – Schreiber later stated that he thought Sutton had entered the room and tried to stop him, with Schreiber reacting by stabbing him. Other reports state that Sutton was attacked in his study, potentially being attacked with a glass vase or whisky tumbler – a point that Schreiber later denied. Having been attacked by being glassed, Sutton tried to raise the alarm, but was killed before he could do so.

Schreiber later stated that he "couldn't stop attacking my mum and Richard", despite Anne, at one point shouting "will you stop, will you stop?". Schreiber stated how he could not stop, continuing to go 'back and forth' between Anne and Sutton, continuing to stab them.

After initially being attacked downstairs, Sutton limped upstairs to the landing just outside his bedroom, where he was stabbed a further five times in the chest by Schreiber, with there being a 'significant pause' between the initial and 'second and distinct' attacks.

Having killed Sutton and seriously injured Anne, Schreiber, covered in blood, sat on the sofa, later stating that he thought "I've killed my family". Disgusted at this, he planned to commit suicide. He washed himself and one of the knives he had used, before allegedly going to the annexe in the property where he lived, collecting belongings, including his British and Danish passport, before he fled in Sutton's Range Rover from the address. He was seen at approximately 19:00 BST by a friend of Sutton's daughter, who recognised the car he was driving and saw Schreiber at the wheel.

At some point, Schreiber left voice messages to friends and family. In one, he apologised for making a 'mistake' and letting his emotions get the better of him. Schreiber continued, saying "I've killed my mother and I've killed her partner". Schreiber claimed in a voice message that lies, deceit and denial had become too much. Schreiber's girlfriend, Sathia Pagliuca, was alerted as to something going on when he transferred her £30,000, with a message saying 'love from Thomas'. She called Schreiber about this, with him sobbing as he told her that he'd 'fucked up' and 'killed Richard and his mum' and that he was going to kill himself. Schreiber begged to see her - instead, she immediately left her flat. Pagliuca told Schreiber that he should 'hand himself into the police', explaining it was better to "live in prison" than to "be a coward and take your own life", after Schreiber said "should I live the rest of my life in prison?" Pagliuca then called police regarding her concerns at 21:00 BST.

However, police were already at the address by that time, having been called to the address at 19:30 BST, following a number of reports that Schreiber had attacked Anne and Sutton and was going to commit suicide. Armed police were initially sent to the scene, with the address known for having a registered gun cabinet. At 20:41 BST, officers smashed the rear patio doors, entering the address where they firstly discovered Anne. She was described as "barely conscious" and looked as if she had been in a car crash. Anne had suffered 15 separate injuries, including wounds to her head, arm, chest, neck, shoulder and back, including her spinal cord being partially severed.

Police later discovered Sutton, who was motionless and had suffered five stab wounds. Two of the wounds were deep enough to penetrate the rib cage and puncture the lung. One wound punctured the heart, whilst the other punctured the main blood vessel going away from the heart. At 21:15 BST, Sutton was pronounced dead at the scene.

A knife was found in an upstairs sink, which had Sutton's blood on and another knife was located under the kitchen table that contained Anne's blood.

Anne Schreiber was airlifted to Southmead Hospital in Bristol, in a critical condition. She was described as 'cardiovascular compromised' on arrival at the hospital. During surgery, Anne was given approximately 27 litres of blood products (for reference, the human body holds between four and six litres). After the attack, Anne was left with life-changing injuries, being paralysed from the neck down and at one stage, breathing with a ventilator.

Meanwhile, just before 21:30 BST, police spotted Sutton's Range Rover on the A303 near to Winterbourne Stoke, Wiltshire. As police attempted to stop Schreiber, he sped off and he was pursued by police along the A303, A4 and M3 in a 'high-speed chase', whereby Schreiber drove at speeds up to 135 mph. This included support from various police forces, as well as the National Police Air Service. Schreiber later stated that he stabbed himself and cut his wrists during the police pursuit. Police forced the vehicle to stop on Chiswick High Road, in Hammersmith, West London at approximately 22:45 BST. The approximate distance from where Schreiber started to where he was stopped was 116.1 miles. As the vehicle had stopped, Schreiber stabbed himself a number of times in the chest with a third knife he had taken from the kitchen of the Moorhill estate and was tasered by police to get him to drop the knife and 'stop him from killing himself'. He was heard by police to repeatedly ask to be killed by the armed officers, at one stage stating "just kill me, I pay your wages, I ask you to kill me". Within the car, police located a suitcase with clothes and Schreiber's passport. Schreiber was taken for treatment for superficial injuries of chest wounds at St Mary's Hospital in Paddington. The next day, he was arrested for Sutton's murder and the attempted murder of Anne.

== Trial ==
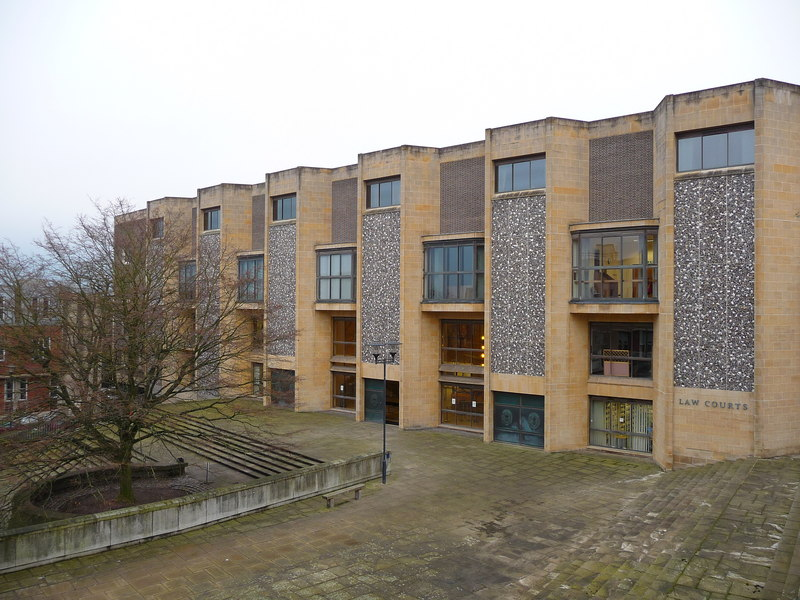
Winchester Law Courts

The trial was held at Winchester Crown Court, starting on Monday 29 November 2021. The presiding judge was the Honourable Mr Justice Garnham, with Adam Feest KC as prosecutor and Joe Stone KC representing Schreiber.

Schreiber had initially appeared at a hearing on 11 October 2021, where he admitted manslaughter by grounds of diminished responsibility or loss of control and dangerous driving, but denied murder and attempted murder.

Schreiber argued that he did not want to kill Sutton or Anne, but 'demons' rather than himself were to blame for the attacks, with his state of mind affected by "long-running family tensions and the stress of the Covid lockdown". He stated that he didn't know why he attacked the couple, stating "I couldn't physically control myself". He also said "I didn't know what I was doing, my mind was completely frazzled".

Psychiatrist Dr Timothy Rogers gave evidence at the trial, stating that Schreiber's depression could provide a partial defence of diminished responsibility, but that Schreiber was not suffering from psychosis or experiencing hallucinations. This was further backed up by a second psychiatrist, Dr John Sandford, who stated he did not believe Schreiber had a mental disorder or severe mental illness.

== Verdict ==
The jury initially deliberated for four hours and 18 minutes. After this time, they were unable to reach a unanimous decision and instead were asked for a majority verdict. 33 minutes later, the jury found Schreiber guilty of murder and attempted murder, with a majority of 11 to one.

== Sentence ==
On 20 December 2021, Schreiber was sentenced to life imprisonment with a minimum term of 36 years.

Mr Justice Garnham said to Schreiber: "Your actions have caused utter devastation in the Sutton and Schreiber families", adding, "You treated Sir Richard’s house and possessions as if they were your own. You showed neither him or your mother any respect. Instead, during your time in their home you displayed a breathtaking sense of entitlement. At times you left Sir Richard feeling like a prisoner in his own home. You are a man with a very bad temper."

== Sentence appeals ==
On 9 December 2022, it was reported that Schreiber had been granted leave to appeal his sentence and conviction at the Court of Appeal. This was after a previous failed attempt in the summer before.

Although initially appealing the conviction, this application was abandoned. Schreiber's appeal against his sentence was dismissed again on 22 February 2023.
