= Baron Keane =

Extinct barony in the Peerage of the United Kingdom

Baron Keane, of Ghuznee in Afghanistan and of Cappoquin in the County of Waterford, was a title in the Peerage of the United Kingdom. It was created on 23 December 1839 for the military commander John Keane. He was the second son of Sir John Keane, 1st Baronet, of Cappoquin (see Keane Baronets for earlier history of the family). The third Baron was a Lieutenant-General in the British Army. The title became extinct on his death in 1901.

== Barons Keane (1839) ==
- John Keane, 1st Baron Keane (6 February 1781 – 26 August 1844), Lieutenant General British Army. He married firstly Grace Smith (d. 14 July 1838) daughter of Sir John Smith on 1 August 1806. They had six children:
  - Edward Arthur Wellington Keane (1815–1882), 2nd Baron
  - John Manly Arbuthnot Keane (1816–1901), 3rd Baron
  - George Disney Keane (26 September 1817 – 19 October 1891) a Royal Navy Admiral, he married 13 July 1881 Katherine Mary Langford Brooke daughter of Alexander McLeod and widow of Thomas Langford Brooke. He died at Mere Hall Knutsford Cheshire. The value of his personal estate was £30,993 16s 5d.
  - Hussey Fane Keane (14 June 1822 – 26 October 1895) a Lieut General Royal Engineers and Aide-de-Camp to Queen Victoria. He married on 11 January 1886 Isabella Emma Elizabeth Schuster daughter of the 5th Earl of Orkney. He died in Sunningdale Berkshire, his estate was valued at £35991 1s 4d.
  - Charlotte Amelia Keane (d. 22 June 1859, Chelsea)
  - Georgiana Isabella Keane (d. 14 April 1854)) married W. H. Penrose on 16 July 1840.

He secondly married Charlotte Maria Boland, the daughter of a Colonel Boland on 20 August 1840. Upon his death, the barony passed to his eldest son Edward Arthur Wellington Keane.

- Edward Arthur Wellington Keane, 2nd Baron Keane (4 May 1815 – 25 July 1882), married on 13 April 1847 in the British Embassy Paris Caroline Louisa Lydia Benyon (d. 3 January 1903), they had one child Emily Julia Charlotte Keane (12 January 1848 – 2 July 1911). Emily Julia Charlotte married Henry Arthur Herbert (d. 1901) on 20 October 1866 and had one son and two daughters. Upon the death of Edward Baron Keane, the barony passed to his younger brother John Manly Arbuthnot Keane.
- John Manly Arbuthnot Keane, 3rd Baron Keane (1 September 1816 – 27 November 1901) Captain Rifle Brigade. He married firstly on 11 May 1848 in St George's Hanover Square London Mary Jane Palliser (19 November 1801 – 24 October 1881) the daughter Sir Hugh Palliser 2nd Baronet she was formerly married to William Lockhart MP (married 1822, divorced 1835). He married secondly on 6 May 1885 in Kensington Middlesex Francina Maria Morrell née Lane (1825 – 20 November 1901) daughter of Charles Lane and widow of Thomas Morrell Bishop-Coadjutor of Edinburgh. John Baron Keane and Lady Keane died in the same month and are buried in Brookwood Cemetery (North West corner Plot 3). His estate was valued at £13,185 6s 1d.

== See also ==
- Keane Baronets
- Palliser Baronets
- John Keane, 1st Baron Keane
