= Sutton baronets =

Set index for Sutton baronets

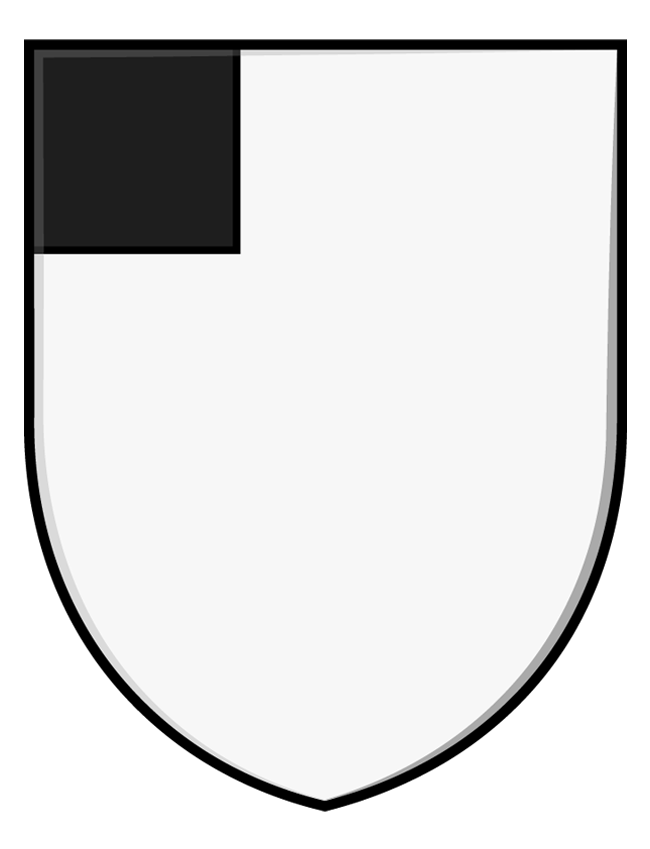
Coat of arms of Sutton baronets (1772)

There have been four baronetcies created for persons with the surname Sutton, one in the Baronetage of Great Britain and three in the Baronetage of the United Kingdom. One creation is extant as of 2023.

- Sutton baronets of Norwood Park (1772)
- Sutton baronets of Moulsey (1806): see Sir Thomas Sutton, 1st Baronet (1755–1813)
- Sutton baronets of Castle House (1919): see Sir George Sutton, 1st Baronet, of Castle House (1869–1947), newspaper executive
- Sutton baronets of Beckenham (1922): see Sir George Sutton, 1st Baronet, of Beckenham (1856–1934), chairman of W. T. Henley's Telegraph Works Company (1918–1932)
