= Leigh baronets of South Carolina (1773) =

Leigh baronets
- Arms of the Leigh baronets of South Carolina
- Creation date: 15 May 1773
- Status: extinct
- Extinction date: 1870

The Leigh baronetcy, of South Carolina, British North America, was created in the Baronetage of Great Britain on 15 May 1773 for Sir Egerton Leigh, Attorney-General of the British colony of South Carolina, grandson of the Revd Peter Leigh, of West Hall, High Legh, Cheshire by his wife Elizabeth Egerton, only daughter and eventual heiress of the Hon. Thomas Egerton, of Tatton Park, third son of John Egerton, 2nd Earl of Bridgwater.

== Leigh baronets, of South Carolina (1773) ==
- Sir Egerton Leigh, 1st Baronet (1733–1781), Attorney-General of South Carolina, created a baronet of Great Britain, styled of South Carolina, America.
- The Revd Sir Egerton Leigh, 2nd Baronet (1762–1818), founding Minister of Rugby Baptist Church.
- Sir Samuel Egerton Leigh, 3rd Baronet, FRSA (1796–1870), of Brownsover Hall, Warwickshire, who died abroad. It is not certain whether the baronetcy became extinct or fell dormant on his death.

== Notes ==
Baronetage of Great Britain
| Preceded by Sutton baronets | Leigh baronets of South Carolina; 15 May 1773 | Succeeded by Hughes baronets |
