= Wright baronets of Swansea (1920) =

Escutcheon of the Wright baronets of Swansea

The Wright baronetcy, of Swansea in the County of Glamorgan, was created in the Baronetage of the United Kingdom on 27 January 1920 for the steel manufacturer John Wright, a director of Baldwins Ltd.

The 2nd Baronet worked in the Ministry of Munitions in World War I, and in the Ministry of Supply in World War II, with responsibilities for iron and steel. He was chairman of Baldwins Ltd. from 1925. The title became extinct on his death in 1950.

== Wright baronets, of Swansea (1920) ==
- Sir John Roper Wright, 1st Baronet (1843–1926)
- Sir William Charles Wright, 2nd Baronet, GBE (1876–1950)
