= Wright baronets of Carolside (1772) =

Escutcheon of the Wright baronets of Carolside

The Wright baronetcy, of Carolside in the County of Berwick, was created in the Baronetage of Great Britain on 8 December 1772 for James Wright. He was Governor of the province of Georgia from 1761 to his departure from the American colonies in 1782.

The title is presumed to have become extinct on the death of the 3rd Baronet in 1837.

== Wright baronets, of Carolside (1772) ==
- Sir James Wright, 1st Baronet (1716–1786)
- Sir James Wright, 2nd Baronet (c. 1747–1816)
- Sir James Alexander Wright, 3rd Baronet (1799–1837)

== Notes ==
Baronetage of Great Britain
Preceded by Sutton baronets	Wright baronets of Carolside; 8 December 1772	Succeeded by Leigh baronets
