= Keane baronets =

Title in the Baronetage of the United Kingdom

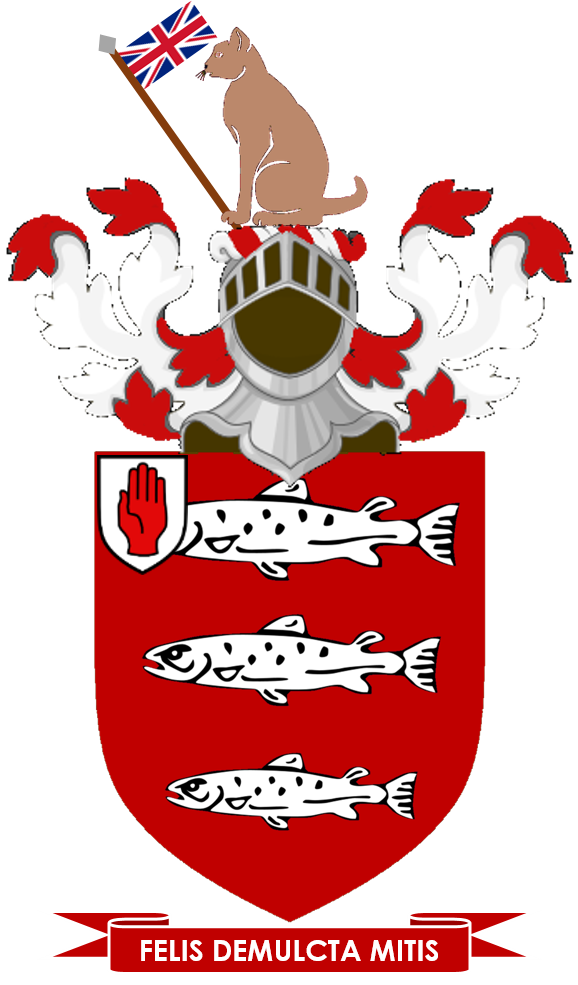
Arms: Gules three Salmon naiant in pale Argent; Crest: A Cat-a-Mountain sejant proper supporting in his dexter paw a Flagstaff thereon a Union Jack proper; Motto: Felis Demulcta Mitis (The stroked cat is gentle)

The Keane Baronetcy, of Belmont in the County of Waterford, is a title in the Baronetage of the United Kingdom. It was created on 1 August 1801 for John Keane, Member of Parliament for Youghal from 1801 to 1806 and from 1808 to 1818. He had earlier represented Bangor in the Irish House of Commons. The second Baronet was Whig Member of Parliament for County Waterford between 1832 and 1835. The third Baronet served as high sheriff of County Waterford in 1856 and the fourth Baronet in 1881. The fifth Baronet was a Senator of the Irish Free State and Governor of the Bank of Ireland. The sixth Baronet, Sir Richard Keane, excelled in the military and also worked in 1930s as a diplomatic correspondent for The Times newspaper. Sir Richard Keane was also partly responsible for bringing the Military and Hospitaller Order of St. Lazarus of Jerusalem to Ireland in 1962 and was a Knight of St. Lazarus. As of 2014 the title is held by his son, the seventh Baronet, who succeeded in 2010.

This is the same baronetcy sometimes known as Keane of Cappoquin also in Waterford. The second son of the first baronet, Gen. John Keane, was raised to the peerage as Baron Keane of Ghuznee and Cappoquin for his capture of the city during the First Afghan War.

The family seat is Cappoquin House, near Cappoquin, County Waterford.

== Keane baronets, of Belmont and of Cappoquin (1801) ==
- Sir John Keane, 1st Baronet (1757–1829)
- Sir Richard Keane, 2nd Baronet (1780–1855)
- Sir John Henry Keane, 3rd Baronet (1816–1881)
- Sir Richard Francis Keane, 4th Baronet (1845–1892)
- Sir John Keane, 5th Baronet (1873–1956)
- Sir Richard Michael Keane, 6th Baronet (1909–2010)
- Sir (John) Charles Keane, 7th Baronet (born 1941)

The heir apparent is the present holder's son Richard Christopher Keane (born 1981).

== Notes ==
Baronetage of the United Kingdom
Preceded by Homan baronets	Keane baronets of Belmont and of Cappoquin; 1 August 1801	Succeeded by Chatterton baronets
