= Sir John Wright, 1st Baronet =

British steel manufacturer

Sir John Wright Bt DL
- Born: John Roper Wright; 12 March 1843; Croston, Chorley, Lancashire, England
- Died: 25 July 1926 (aged 83); Bath, Somerset, England
- Occupation: Steel industrialist

Sir John Roper Wright, 1st Baronet, DL (12 March 1843 – 25 July 1926) was a British steel manufacturer.

Wright was born in Croston, near Chorley, Lancashire. He became a pupil at the Soho Engineering Works in Preston and then worked for Sir William Siemens. He established his own company, Wright, Butler & Co, at Gowerton, near Swansea, and founded a number of steel works. His company was later absorbed by Baldwins Ltd, of which he became a director. He became chairman in 1908, succeeding Alfred Baldwin, father of Stanley Baldwin, the future prime minister.

Wright was a prominent Liberal Unionist and unsuccessfully stood for Parliament in 1895 and 1910. He was created a Baronet in the 1920 New Year Honours.

Wright died in Bath, Somerset, in 1926. He was succeeded in the baronetcy by his son, William Charles, upon whose death in 1950 the title became extinct.

== Footnotes ==
Baronetage of the United Kingdom
New creation	Baronet (of Swansea); 1920–1926	Succeeded by Charles Wright
