= Fortescue Graham =

English Royal Marines officer

General Sir Fortescue Graham KCB
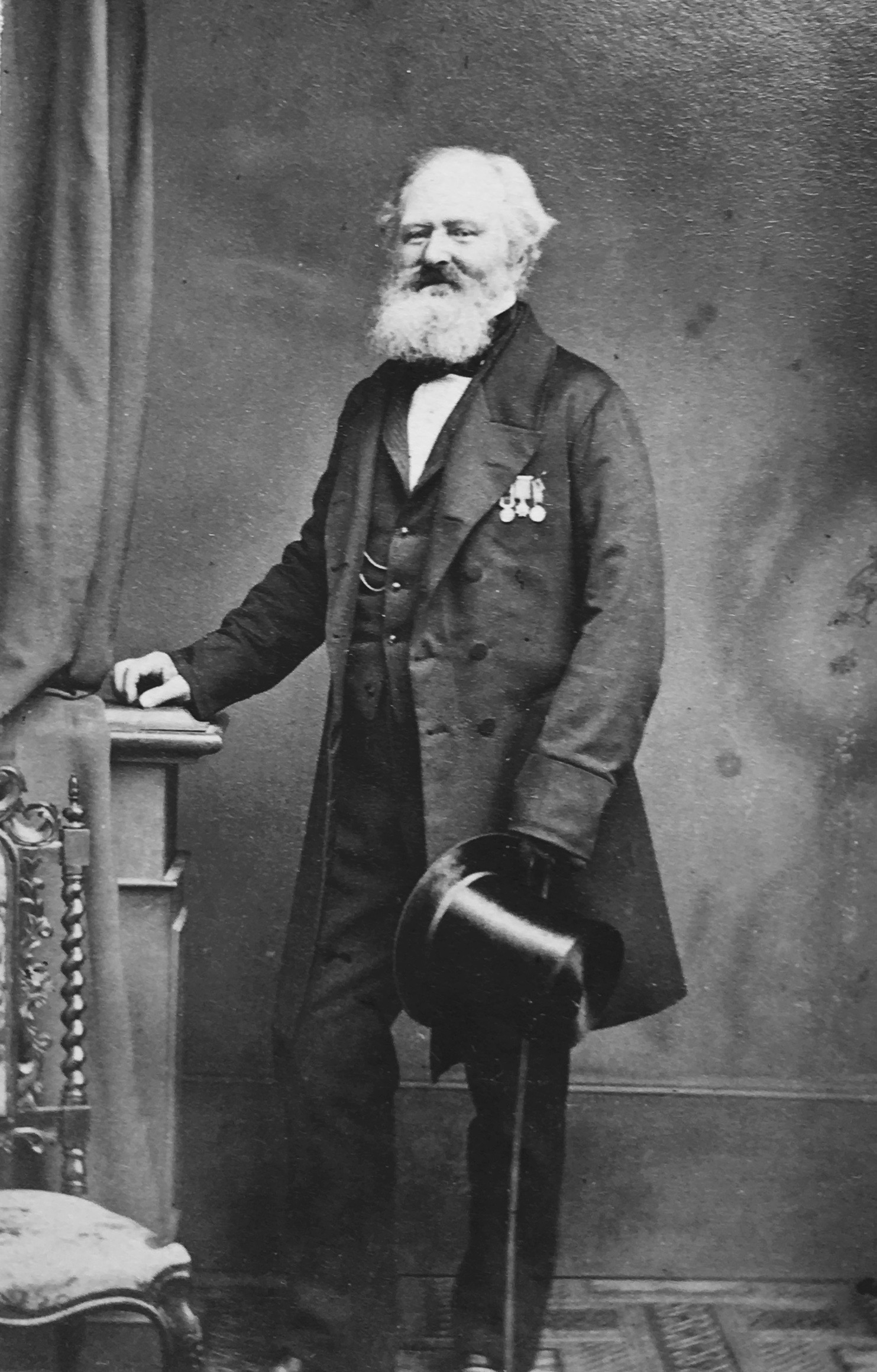
- Graham, c. 1870
- Born: 1794; Tintinhull, Somerset, England
- Died: 9 October 1880 (aged 85–86); Stonehouse, Devon, England
- Military career
- Allegiance: United Kingdom
- Branch: Royal Marines
- Service years: 1808–1870
- Rank: General
- Conflicts: Napoleonic Wars; Walcheren Campaign; Peninsular War; War of 1812; First Carlist War; First Opium War; Crimean War; Battle of Bomarsund
- Awards: Knight Commander of the Order of the Bath

General Sir Fortescue Graham (1794 – 9 October 1880) was a senior Royal Marines officer, serving for 62 years and seeing active service in the Napoleonic Wars, the Peninsular War, and the War of 1812, and later in Spain, China, and the Baltic Campaign of 1854.

== Early life ==
Fortescue Graham was born in Tintinhull, Somerset, the son of Colonel Richard Graham, Royal Marines, (a descendant of the Grahams of Platten, County Meath), and his wife, Catherine, the daughter of Captain Philip Walsh, Royal Navy. He was educated at Martock College, Somerset.

== Royal Marines ==
Graham joined the Royal Marines when aged only 14, being appointed as a second lieutenant in the Chatham Division of the Royal Marines on 17 November 1808. He remained in that rank for the next seventeen years, twelve of them in the artillery branch of the marines. He was with the composite battalion formed of marines of the squadron, which served with the army ashore in the Walcheren Campaign of 1809. Subsequently, he served with the 1st Battalion of Royal Marines in Portugal and in the north of Spain, including the capture and defence of Castro Urdiales.

Graham proceeded with the 1st Battalion to America, and was present under Sir Sydney Beckwith at the attack on Norfolk and taking of Hampton, Virginia in 1814. When the brigade was broken up, Graham accompanied the battalion to Canada, and was sent in charge of a division of gunboats to attack an American battery at the head of Lake Champlain, with which he was engaged several hours. Afterwards he returned with the battalion to the coast of America, and was present at the attack and capture of Fort Peter and the town of St. Mary's, Georgia.

He became a first lieutenant on 6 May 1825, and after almost thirty years service as a subaltern was promoted to captain on 10 July 1837. Soon after he joined the battalion of marines doing duty in Spain during the First Carlist War, and subsequently went to China, where he commanded the marine battalion in the demonstration against Nanking at the close of the First Anglo-Chinese War. He was promoted to major on 11 November and lieutenant colonel on 26 November 1851, and to colonel on 20 January 1854. In July–August 1854 Graham commanded a brigade of marines at the capture of Bomarsund Fortress, in Åland, during the Baltic campaign, and was made a Companion of the Order of the Bath in July 1855. He served as the Colonel Commandant of the Portsmouth Division of Royal Marines from 1855 to 1857, and as Aide-de-camp to the Queen from 1854 to 1857. He was made a major general in 1857, served as Colonel of the Plymouth Division from 1863, was made a lieutenant general and a Knight Commander of the Order of the Bath in 1865, General and Colonel of the Royal Marine Artillery in 1866, and finally retired in 1870.

== Personal life ==
Graham was married twice; firstly in 1828 to Caroline, the daughter of George Palliser. After her death in 1859, he married Jane Mary, the daughter of Captain Lowcay, Royal Navy, and widow of Admiral William Blight, she died in 1866. Graham died at his residence, 69 Durnford Street, Stonehouse, Devonshire, on 9 October 1880.
