= Sudbrooke =

Village and civil parish in Lincolnshire, England

Coordinates: 53.264839°N 0.443917°W

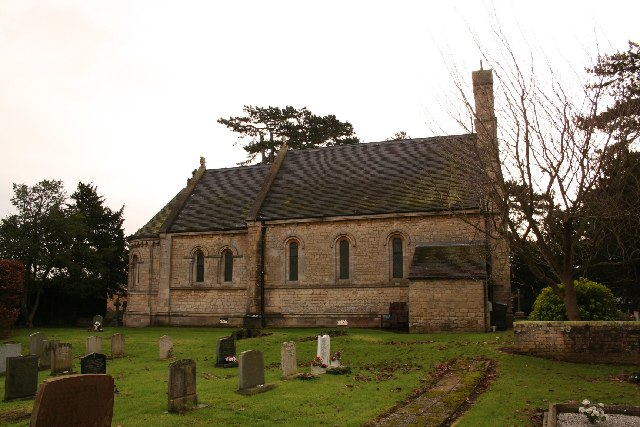
- St Edward's Church, Sudbrooke

- Location within Lincolnshire
- Population: 1,788 (2011)
- OS grid reference: TF038753
  - London: 120 mi (190 km) S
- District: West Lindsey
- Shire county: Lincolnshire
- Region: East Midlands
- Country: England
- Sovereign state: United Kingdom
- Post town: LINCOLN
- Postcode district: LN2
- Dialling code: 01522
- Police: Lincolnshire
- Fire: Lincolnshire
- Ambulance: East Midlands

Sudbrooke is a village and civil parish in the West Lindsey district of Lincolnshire, England. It is situated 5 miles (8 km) north-east of Lincoln. The population of the civil parish at the 2011 census was 1,788.

Sudbrooke is situated just off the A158 Lincoln to Skegness road, and although the original heart of the village near the church has existed for centuries. It was known only from written records the site of Holme in Sudbrooke has been built over since.

Sudbrooke church is dedicated to Saint Edward the Confessor, and was built in 1860 by John Dobson of Newcastle upon Tyne. It is a Grade II* listed building. A much older churchyard cross was restored at about the same time. The new church replaced an older brick building, possibly itself a successor to an older Norman church. The church is part of the Barlings Group Ministry in the Deanery of Lawres.

There appears to have been a searchlight battery in the village at some point during the Second World War.

Sudbrooke has a convenience shop, a café, a hairdresser, two playgrounds, and a village hall which is primarily used by independent groups.

== Notable people ==
- Sir John Sutton, 3rd Baronet (1820–1873) Benefactor and patron in Kiedrich
- Sir Richard Sutton, 4th Baronet (1821–1878), cricketer
