= Palliser baronets =

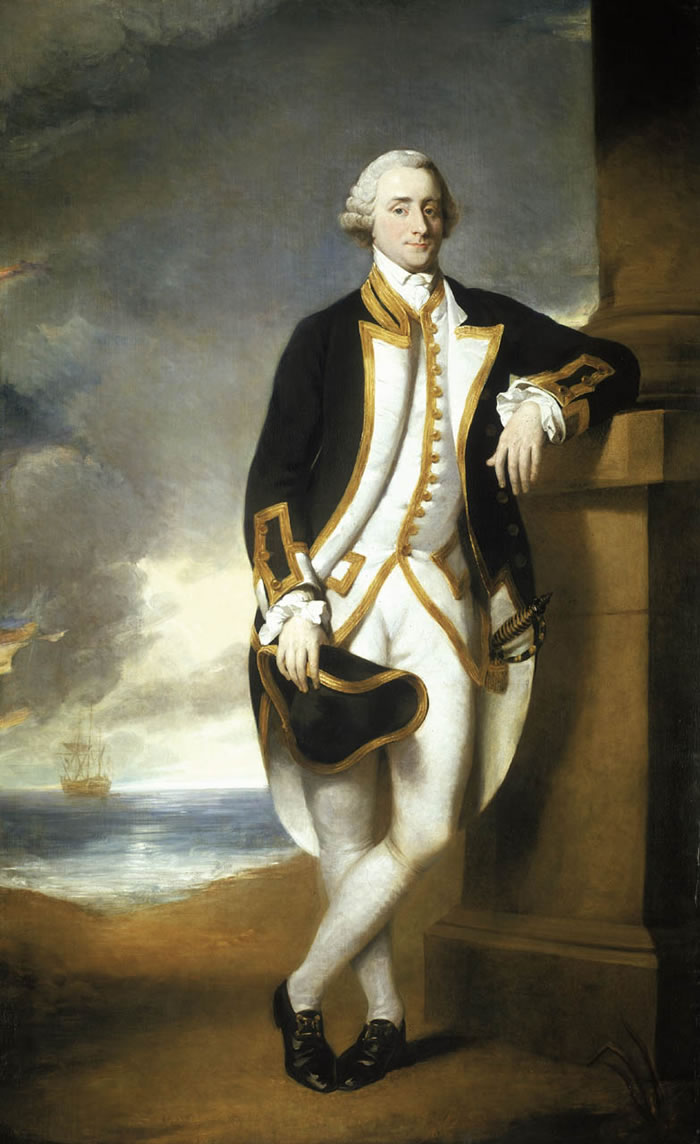
Admiral Sir Hugh Palliser, 1st Baronet

The Palliser Baronetcy, of The Vache in the County of Buckingham, was a title in the Baronetage of Great Britain. It was created on 6 August 1773 for the naval commander Admiral Hugh Palliser. The title became extinct on the death of the third Baronet in 1868.

== Palliser baronets, of The Vache (1773) ==
- Sir Hugh Palliser, 1st Baronet (1723–1796). Admiral of the White (see main article on Admiral Sir Hugh Palliser), died unmarried on 19 March 1796. The Baronetcy passed to his great-nephew Hugh Palliser Walters. The estate of The Vache was inherited by Sir Hugh's illegitimate son George Thomas (see below).
- Sir Hugh Palliser Palliser, 2nd Baronet (1768–1813). Born Hugh Palliser Walters on 27 October 1768 in Ross, County Wexford. The eldest son of George Robinson Walters and his wife Mary née Orfeur. He succeeded to the Baronetcy on 19 March 1796 on the death of his great-uncle, he assumed by Royal Licence dated 18 January 1798 the surname and arms of Palliser. He married Mary Gates (1758 – 5 August 1823) daughter of John Gates of Dedham, Essex on 18 January 1790 in Queen Square Chapel Bath. They had three children:
  - Hugh Palliser Walters (1796–1868)
  - Mary Anne Rachel Palliser (16 March 1798 – 10 December 1826).
  - Mary Jane Palliser (19 November 1801 – 24 October 1881). Married firstly William Lockhart (1787–1856), on 16 April 1822 in Walcott Bath, divorced in 1835 by the Scottish Courts. Married secondly John Manly Arbuthnot Keane later the 3rd Baron Keane (1816–1901) on 11 May 1848 in St George's Hanover Square London.

Sir Hugh, 2nd Baronet, died on 17 November 1813 in Troyes France. He was succeeded by his only son Hugh Palliser Palliser (formerly Walters).

- Sir Hugh Palliser Palliser, 3rd Baronet (1796–1868). Born on 8 May 1796 Greenwich, Kent baptised Hugh Palliser Walters on 17 June 1796 in Greenwich, Kent. Succeeded to the Baronetcy on 17 November 1813 upon the death of his father the second baronet. Admitted to the Dublin asylum 1853; order of lunacy issued on 15 November 1854. Sir Hugh died unmarried on 3 August 1868 in Castletown, Carne, County Wexford, when the Baronetcy became extinct.

== Direct descendants of Sir Hugh Palliser, 1st Baronet ==
Sir Hugh Palliser, 1st Baronet (b. 1723), died unmarried on 19 March 1796. The estate of The Vache was inherited by Sir Hugh's illegitimate son George Thomas.

- George Thomas (later George Palliser) (1759 – 1829) the natural son of Sir Hugh Palliser, assumed the name Palliser in 1796. In 1826 George Palliser together with his eldest son George Hugh Palliser sold The Vache to Thomas Allen of Newlands in Chalfont St. Peter. He married Ann Parminter (1768 – 1843) on 21 November 1791, they had twelve children:
  - George Hugh Thomas (later George Hugh Palliser) (born c. 1792, baptised 13 November 1793 – 26 September 1842, aged 50). was a captain in the Royal Marines. He married Mary White Westropp (c. 1805 – 13 December 1842) daughter of Colonel Westropp on 22 April 1829 at Plymouth. They had a son: George Hugh Palliser (April 1830 – 18 October 1841).
  - Henry Thomas (later Henry Palliser) (bapt. 13 November 1793 – 17 December 1864) major general Royal Artillery. His Royal Artillery regimental number was 1523 and he was 16 years 8 months old when commissioned as Ensign on 4 June 1810, he was promoted to lieutenant on 18 February 1814, captain on 27 September 1832, major 9 November 1846, colonel 28 November 1854. He served in the Peninsula and France, from November 1812 to May 1814, including the siege of San Sebastian, and battles of Vitoria, Orthez, and Toulouse, for which he received the Silver War Medal with four Clasps. Served subsequently in the American war, including the battles of Bladensburg and Baltimore, the capture of Washington, and operations before New Orleans. He was with the army of occupation in France from June 1815 to November 1818, and present at the capture of Paris. There was a memorial monument to him at the Heugh Gun Battery, Hartlepool Headland. He married Caroline Hardinge (1800 – 1870), children included:
    - Fanny Ann Palliser (1829 – 1872)
    - Charles Henry Palliser (1830 – 22 November 1895) major general Bengal Staff Corps. He was educated at Addiscombe and entered the army in 1847. He was severely wounded on the Derajat frontier 1853, he was involved in the Indian mutiny with Renaud's force from Allahabad to Cawnpur, and with General Havelock's force. Commanded the Irregular Cavalry at Fatehpur, at the Alambagh and the first relief of Lucknow where he defended the residency until the second relief by Sir Colin Campbell. He was at the Alambagh under Sir James Outram from November 1857 to March 1858. He was at the capture of Lucknow and was with Hodson's Horse. He commanded the 10th Bengal Cavalry in Abyssinia (now Ethiopia). He was in the Afghan war 1879-80 and was with Sir Donald Stewart's force to Kandahar and commanded the Cavalry Brigade at Ahmad Kheyl and Urzoo. He married Harriet Bertha Cotton (1832 – 1915) in 1871 in Kensington London
    - George Hugh Palliser (1830 – 1841)
    - Caroline Palliser (b. 1832)
    - Mary Palliser (b. 1833)
    - Emily Louisa (1835 – 1859)
    - Georgiana Palliser (b. 1838)
    - Henry John Palliser
  - John Costobadie Palliser (bapt. 20 August 1796 – bur. 13 November 1818)
  - Ann Palliser (bapt. 22 September 1797 – bur. 24 October 1803)
  - Caroline Palliser (bapt. 6 January 1801 – 1859) married Fortesque Graham (1794 – 9 October 1880) in 1828
  - Elizabeth Palliser (bapt. 10 November 1802 – 1865) married John Henry Stewart
  - Sarah Palliser (bapt. 8 June 1804 – 11 September 1811)
  - Anthony Palliser (bapt.12 July 1805 – 22 February 1815)
  - Georgiana Palliser (bapt. 6 January 1808)
  - Louisa Palliser (bapt. 30 August 1809)
  - Robert Warren Palliser (bapt. 8 January 1812 – 26 October 1817)
  - Mary Palliser married Edward William Churchill on 1 May 1827

== Palliser surname ==
The Palliser surname has been assumed by several people:

- George Thomas (1759–1829) became George Palliser in 1796. His wife and two eldest children born before 1796 also assumed the name Palliser.
- Hugh Palliser Walters (1768–1813) became Hugh Palliser Palliser in 1798. His wife and eldest son born before 1798 also assumed the name Palliser.
- Mary Jane Lockhart (1801–1881) reverted to her maiden surname of Palliser c.1846–48 prior to her marriage to John Manly Arbuthnot Keane.
- Henry John William Farrell (1867–1917) became Henry John William Farrell Palliser in 1902.

When the Palliser Baronetcy became extinct in 1868 Mary Jane Keane née Palliser (1801–1881), the sister of the 3rd Baronet, and the wife of the future 3rd Baron Keane, made provision for the continuation of the Palliser surname. Her Will dated 28 December 1868 made provision 'for my dear and early friend ... Major [John Sidney] Farrell late of the Royal Artillery ... Provided always that the said Henry [John] Farrell [the second son of Major John Sidney Farrell] and his issue male ... shall ... obtain a license from the Crown to assume and use the surname of Palliser either alone or in addition to his own name so that the name Palliser shall be the last and Principal name and thenceforth use the said Surname'. Major Henry John Farrell died in 1889, his son Major Henry John William Farrell (1867–1917) assumed the additional surname Palliser in 1902. Major Henry John William Farrell Palliser married Kathleen Mary Murray (1878–1970) daughter of Major Patrick Murray on 8 December 1902 at St John's Ahmednagar, India and had two children:

- Henry John Farrell Palliser (1905–1937), married Vera Constance Crane (1901–1982) daughter of Clifford Henry Crane on 13 July 1935 in Batheaston, Somerset.
- Rosamond Daphne Farrell Palliser (1914–2012), married Edmund Lewis Llewelyn Vulliamy (1906–1995) on 20 April 1935 in Ahmednagar India.

== See also ==
- Hugh Palliser
- Baron Keane

Baronetage of Great Britain
| Preceded by Hughes baronets | Palliser baronets of The Vache; 6 August 1773 | Succeeded by Coote baronets |
