= Hughes baronets of East Bergholt (1773) =

Baronets of East Bergholt
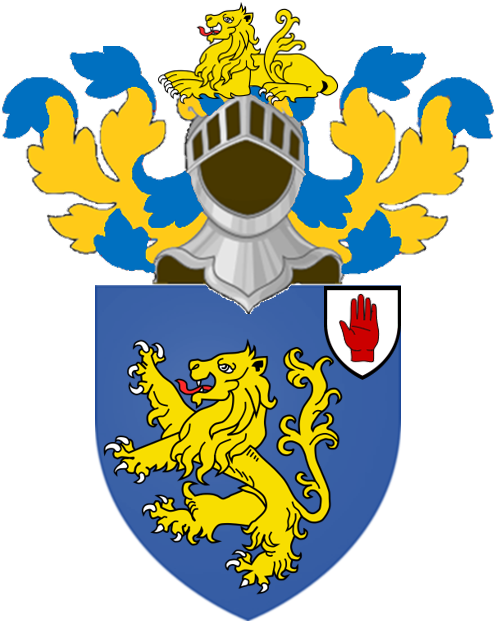
- Crest: A lion couchant Or.
- Shield: Azure a lion rampant Or

The Hughes baronetcy, of East Bergholt in the County of Suffolk, was created in the Baronetage of Great Britain on 17 July 1773 for Richard Hughes, a captain in the Royal Navy and Commissioner of Portsmouth Dockyard. The 2nd Baronet was an Admiral of the Red and was second-in-command under Lord Howe during the Relief of Gibraltar in 1782. He also served as Lieutenant Governor of Nova Scotia.

== Hughes baronets, of East Bergholt (1773) ==
- Sir Richard Hughes, 1st Baronet (c. 1708–1779)
- Sir Richard Hughes, 2nd Baronet (c. 1729–1812)
- Sir Robert Hughes, 3rd Baronet (1739–1814)
- Sir Richard Hughes, 4th Baronet (1768–1833)
- Sir Richard Hughes, 5th Baronet (1803–1863)
- Sir Edward Hughes, 6th Baronet (1807–1871)
- Sir Frederick Hughes, 7th Baronet (1816–1889)
- Sir Thomas Collingwood Hughes, 8th Baronet (1800–1889)
- Sir Alfred Hughes, 9th Baronet (1825–1898)
- Sir (Alfred) Collingwood Hughes, 10th Baronet (1854–1932), High Sheriff of Suffolk from 1923 to 1924.
- Sir Reginald Johansson Hughes, 11th Baronet (1882–1945)
- Sir Robert Heywood Hughes, 12th Baronet (1865–1951)
- Sir Richard Edgar Hughes, 13th Baronet (1897–1970)
- Sir David Collingwood Hughes, 14th Baronet (1936–2003)
- Sir Thomas Collingwood Hughes, 15th Baronet (born 1966)

The heir apparent is the present holder's son Alfred Collingwood Hughes (born 2001).

== Notes ==
Baronetage of Great Britain
Preceded by Leigh baronets	Hughes baronets of East Bergholt; 17 July 1773	Succeeded by Palliser baronets
