= Sir Richard Sutton, 4th Baronet =

English cricketer and soldier

Personal information
- Full name: Richard Sutton
- Born: 21 October 1821; Sudbrooke, Lincolnshire, England
- Died: 3 October 1878 (aged 56); Ryde, Isle of Wight, England
- Batting: Unknown

Domestic team information
- Years: Team
- 1850–1851: Marylebone Cricket Club

Career statistics
Competition	First-class
Matches	5
Runs scored	25
Batting average	3.12
100s/50s	–/–
Top score	8
Catches/stumpings	1/–
- Source: Cricinfo, 28 March 2020

Sir Richard Sutton, 4th Baronet (21 October 1821 – 3 October 1878) was an English first-class cricketer and British Army officer.

== Life ==
The son of Sir Richard Sutton, 2nd Baronet and his wife, Mary Elizabeth Burton, he was born in October 1821 at Sudbrooke, Lincolnshire.

He purchased a commission in the British Army in May 1839 as an ensign in the 97th Regiment of Foot. He later purchased the rank of lieutenant in the 1st Regiment of Life Guards in July 1847. He later served as a deputy lieutenant for Nottinghamshire and succeeded his brother, Sir John Sutton, as the 4th Baronet upon his death in June 1873. Sutton died at Ryde on the Isle of Wight in October 1878, at which point he was succeeded as the 5th Baronet by his son, Sir Richard Sutton, 5th Baronet.

== Cricket ==
Sutton played first-class cricket for the Marylebone Cricket Club in 1850–51, making three appearances against Cambridge University and a single appearance against Oxford University. He made a fifth appearance in first-class cricket in 1857, appearing for the Gentlemen of Kent and Sussex against the Gentlemen of England.

== Family ==
Sutton married firstly Anna Houson (died 8 July 1846), daughter of Reverend H. Houson, of Brant Broughton, in 1845. He married secondly Harriet Anne Burton in 1851.

Baronetage of Great Britain
Preceded by John Sutton	Baronet (of Norwood Park); 1873–1878	Succeeded by Richard Sutton
