= John Keane, 1st Baron Keane =

Irish soldier

Lieutenant-General The Right Honourable The Lord Keane GCB GCH
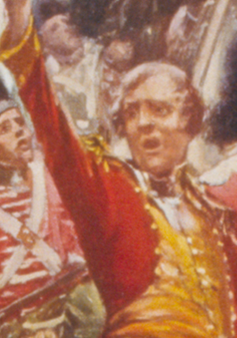
- Born: 6 February 1781; Waterford, County Waterford, Ireland
- Died: 24 August 1844 (aged 63); Burton Lodge, Hampshire, England
- Relatives: Sir John Keane, 1st Baronet (father); Edward Keane (brother)
- Military career
- Allegiance: United Kingdom
- Branch: British Army
- Service years: 1794–1844
- Rank: Lieutenant-General
- Commands: Brigade, 3rd Division; 5th Battalion, 60th Regiment of Foot; Brigade, 3rd Division; 8th Brigade, 5th Division; 9th Brigade, AOOF; Governor of Saint Lucia; British Forces Jamaica; Lieutenant-Governor of Jamaica; Bombay Army; Army of the Indus
- Conflicts: French Revolutionary Wars; Egypt campaign; Battle of Mandora; Battle of Alexandria; Napoleonic Wars; West Indies campaign; Invasion of Martinique; Peninsular War; Battle of Vitoria; Battle of Sorauren; Battle of Nivelle; Battle of Orthes; Battle of Toulouse; War of 1812; Battle of New Orleans (WIA); Battle of Fort Bowyer; First Afghan War; Battle of Ghazni
- Awards: Knight Grand Cross of the Order of the Bath; Knight Grand Cross of the Royal Guelphic Order

Lieutenant-General John Keane, 1st Baron Keane, GCB, GCH (6 February 1781 – 24 August 1844) was an Irish soldier, whose military exploits in the First Anglo-Afghan War led to him being created Baron Keane of Ghuznee.

== Early life ==
John Keane was born in Waterford, Ireland, on 6 February 1781; he was the second son of John Keane of Cappoquin, and his wife Sarah Kelly. Keane's father would be created the Keane baronet in 1801. He was the younger brother of the future Lt.-Col. Sir Richard Keane, 2nd Baronet and the elder of Col. Edward Keane.

== Military service ==
=== French Revolutionary Wars ===
While there is some confusion as to when this occurred, Keane most likely joined the British Army on 11 October 1794, becoming an ensign in the 122nd Regiment of Foot. He was quickly promoted, becoming a lieutenant on 30 October. With the speed of Keane's promotions, it is likely that he never actually reported for duty with the 122nd. His father then purchased his promotion to captain in the 124th Regiment of Foot on 12 November. The 124th was disbanded in May 1795 but some time before this Keane transferred to the half pay of the 73rd Regiment of Foot, a regiment that itself had been disbanded in 1763.

Keane stayed on the half pay of the 73rd until 7 November 1799 when he exchanged into the 44th Regiment of Foot, which was stationed at Gibraltar. The regiment sailed to join the Egypt campaign in October, and while Keane went with them he did so as aide de camp to Lord Cavan and served under Lieutenant-General Sir Ralph Abercromby. In this position Keane fought at the Battle of Mandora on 13 March 1801 and then at the Battle of Alexandria on 21 March. The French in Egypt capitulated in September, after which Keane went to Malta as a staff officer. Keane purchased promotion to major in the 60th Regiment of Foot on 27 May 1802 but did not join the regiment, instead continuing on the staff at Malta until March 1803 when he returned to England. There in August he purchased the lieutenant-colonelcy of the 13th Regiment of Foot, and towards the end of the following year he joined his new regiment at Gibraltar.

=== Napoleonic Wars ===
The 13th returned from Gibraltar in January 1806 and Keane spent the following two years in England building up the numbers of the regiment. Having completed this, in January 1808 he was ordered to join the West Indies campaign with the 13th. They were initially stationed as garrison at Bermuda, but fought at the Invasion of Martinique in early 1809. Keane stayed on at Martinique after this, during which time he was promoted to brevet colonel on 1 January 1812. He exchanged back into the 60th on 25 June the same year. The 5th Battalion of the 60th was fighting in the Peninsular War and Keane went out to join it in October. Upon arriving he was however instead given temporary command of a brigade within 3rd Division. The army was in winter quarters and his role was mostly administrative. Keane continued with his brigade until replaced by Major-General Thomas Brisbane on 23 March 1813, at which point he finally took up the 5th Battalion of the 60th. The battalion companies were mostly split out among the divisions of the army, but Keane had his headquarters and three companies within 3rd Division.

Keane subsequently fought at the Battle of Vitoria on 21 June and the Battle of Sorauren on 28 and 30 July. He was then on 1 August given command of a brigade within the division, being the most senior battalion commander. Keane led his brigade at the Battle of Nivelle on 9 November, and then in the following year at the Battle of Orthes on 27 February, Battle of Tarbes on 20 March, and finally the Battle of Toulouse on 10 April after which the war in Europe ended. The War of 1812 in North America was still however ongoing, and in April Keane was initially planned to be part of the reinforcements sent over to fight in it. The size of this force was then reduced and Keane was not sent.

Keane was promoted to major-general on 4 June the same year. While he did not go with the main British force to North America, he was instead sent in early autumn with reinforcements to Jamaica. While travelling there he learned at Madeira that after defeat at the Battle of Baltimore and the death there of Major-General Robert Ross, the remnants of the main British force had retreated to Jamaica. Keane took command of these troops upon his arrival on 25 November and took his enlarged force to the Mississippi River where they landed on 8 December. He was then superseded in command of the army by Major-General Sir Edward Pakenham, but continued on with it. At the Battle of New Orleans on 8 January 1815 Keane commanded the left assaulting column and was severely wounded in the groin. An especially thick pair of pantaloons saved him from a possibly mortal injury. Keane spent some time recovering from the wound but was able to return to service in February. He was thus present at the capture of Fort Bowyer on 13 February, after which the Treaty of Ghent came into effect and hostilities ended. Keane was created a Knight Commander of the Order of the Bath on 2 January.

Returning to Europe, Keane missed the Battle of Waterloo but was afterwards selected as a casualty replacement in the army. On 2 July he was appointed to command the 8th Brigade, replacing Major-General Sir James Kempt who was in turn filling the gap left at 5th Division by the death of Lieutenant-General Sir Thomas Picton. When the army was reformed into the Army of Occupation in November Keane continued on with it, being given command of the 9th Brigade. The army was subsequently reduced as time went on, and on 25 April 1817 Keane's command was dissolved and he was not given another. The Duke of Wellington wrote to Keane saying that:

I assure you that it was with the greatest pain that I gave the order to remove you from the Staff of this army. It will always give me the greatest pleasure to have your assistance again

=== Bombay Army ===
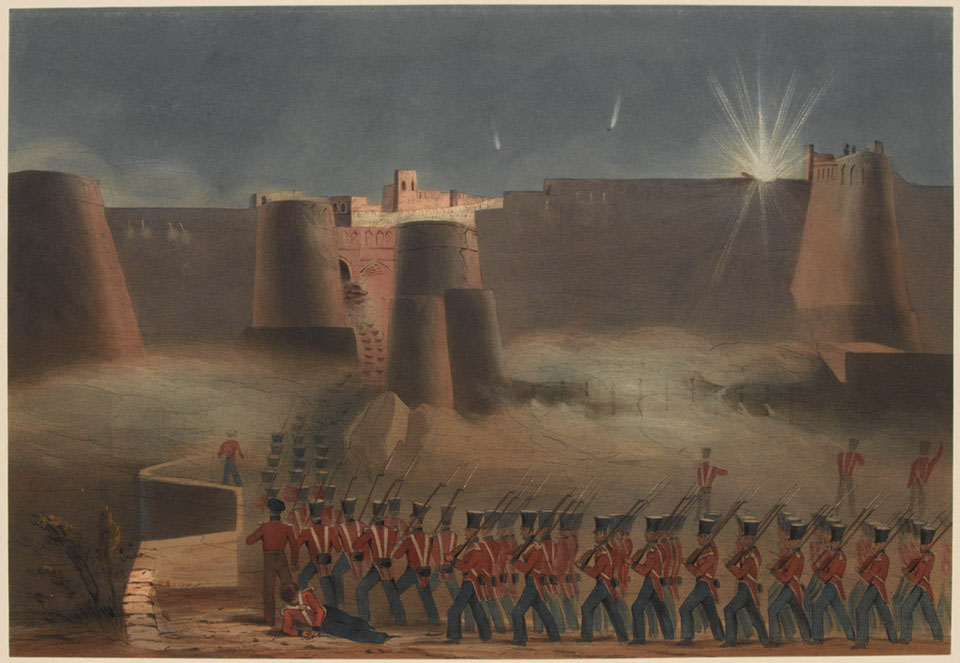
Storming the fortress at Ghuznee

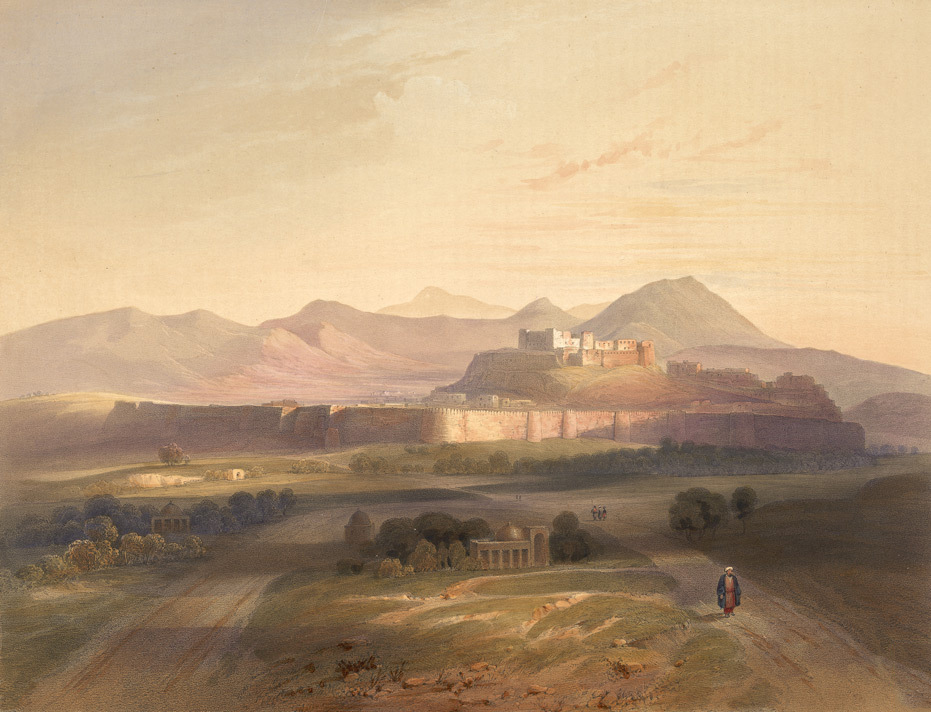
Ghazni, 1839

Keane's next official duties came in 1818 when on 19 January he was appointed Governor of Saint Lucia. He continued on St Lucia until 1823 when he was given command over the British forces at Jamaica. From 1827 to 1829 he also served as Lieutenant-Governor of Jamaica. On 22 July 1830 Keane was promoted to lieutenant-general and he returned to England, having also been appointed colonel of the 94th Regiment of Foot the prior year. Back in England his regimental colonelcy was transferred to the 68th Regiment of Foot on 13 April 1831, and in the same year he was created a Knight Grand Cross of the Royal Guelphic Order. Then on 14 October 1833 Keane was appointed Commander-in-Chief, Bombay Army. He assumed command on 2 July the following year.

On 6 April 1838 Keane was made colonel of the 46th Regiment of Foot. When the First Afghan War began later in the year, in December Keane brought a portion of his force to join the Army of the Indus that had been created for the conflict. General Sir Henry Fane resigned command of the army soon afterwards and Keane took over. As such he commanded it in its invasion of Afghanistan, capturing Karachi in February and fighting the Battle of Ghazni on 23 July 1839. Keane captured Kabul on 6 August and after leaving a garrison force in the country he returned with the Bombay Army to India. On 1 August his colonelcy was transferred to the 43rd Regiment of Foot, and on 12 August he was advanced to Knight Grand Cross of the Order of the Bath. Keane fulfilled his term of office at Bombay, ending on 18 October, after which he returned to Britain. News travelling slowly, it was only after his return in 1840 that he learned he had been created Baron Keane on 12 August the previous year. He was also rewarded with a pension of £2,000 a year.

Keane saw no further service with the army after this. He died at Burton Lodge, Hampshire, on 26 August 1844, most likely from edema caused by congestive heart failure.

== Personal life ==
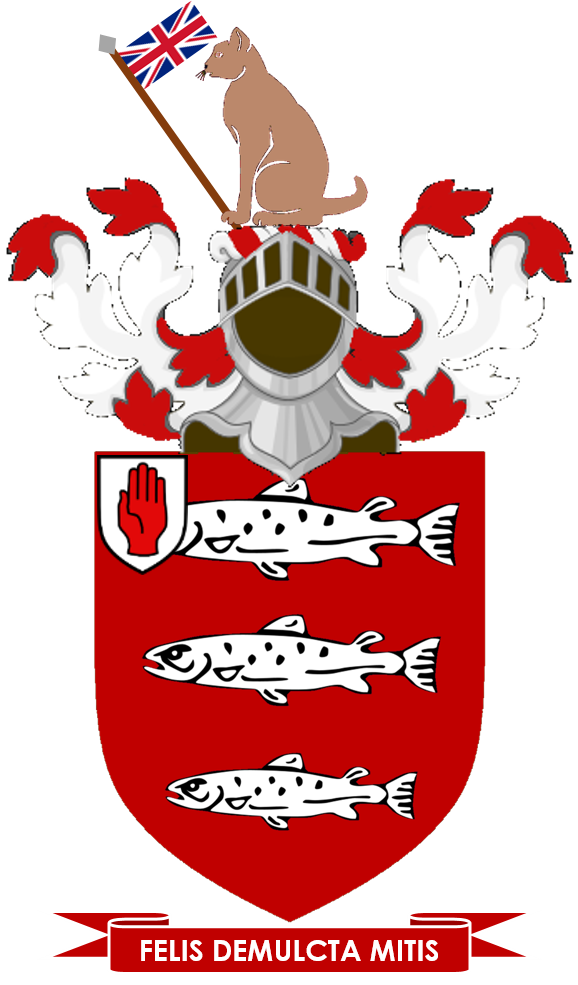
Arms of the Keane baronets of Cappoquin

Keane married Grace Smith, the second daughter of General Sir John Smith, on 10 August 1806. The couple went on to have eight children, of which three sons joined the British Army and one the Royal Navy. Grace died on 14 January 1838 and Keane married Charlotte Maria Boland, the youngest daughter of Colonel John Boland, on 20 August 1840. They had no children.

== Citations ==
Government offices
Preceded by Edward O'Hara	Governor of Saint Lucia; 1818–1823	Succeeded by John Joseph Winkler
Preceded by Lord Manchester	Lieutenant-Governor of Jamaica (acting); 1827–1829	Succeeded by Lord Belmore
Military offices
Preceded by Sir Colin Halkett	C-in-C, Bombay Army; 1833–1839	Succeeded by Sir Thomas McMahon
Preceded by Sir Thomas Bradford	Colonel of the 94th Regiment of Foot; 1829–1831	Succeeded by Sir James Campbell
Preceded by Sir Henry Warde	Colonel of the 68th (Durham) Regiment of Foot (Light Infantry); 1831–1838	Succeeded by Sir William Johnston
Preceded by Henry Wynyard	Colonel of the 46th (South Devonshire) Regiment of Foot; 1838–1839	Succeeded by John Ross
Preceded by Lord Howden	Colonel of the 43rd (Monmouthshire) Regiment of Foot (Light Infantry); 1839–1844	Succeeded by Sir Hercules Pakenham
Peerage of the United Kingdom
New creation	Baron Keane; 1839–1844	Succeeded by Edward Arthur Wellington Keane
