= Edward Keane (British Army officer) =

British Army officer

- Born: 1785
- Died: 2 November 1866 (aged 80–81); Worthing, West Sussex, England
- Father: John Keane
- Relatives: John Keane (brother)
- Military career
- Allegiance: Great Britain
- Branch: Army
- Service years: 1803-1838
- Rank: Colonel
- Commands: 7th Hussars; Grenadier Guards
- Conflicts: Peninsular War; Waterloo Campaign
- Awards: Silver Medal with clasps

Colonel Edward Keane (1785 – 2 November 1866) was a British Army officer of the Napoleonic era who saw service during the Peninsular War and the Waterloo Campaign.

== Life ==
He was the third son of Sir John Keane, 1st Baronet by Sarah, daughter of John Kelly, and brother of John Keane, 1st Baron Keane.

Kene joined the British Army on the 1 December 1803 and was promoted to lieutenant on 21 November 1804. He served on the expedition to North Germany in 1805 and subsequently in the Peninsular War under Sir John Moore and from November 1813 under the Marquis of Wellington.

For his service during the Peninsular War he received the Silver Medal with clasps for Corruna, Nive, Orthes and Toulouse.

During the Waterloo Campaign he was aide-de-camp to Sir Hussey Vivian whose wife was a relative of Keane. At the Battle of Waterloo he was a captain in the 7th Hussars under Lord Uxbridge, being promoted to major after the battle.

He retired as a lieutenant-colonel on half-pay on 29 March 1833.

Keane was subsequently reappointed to the Grenadier Guards and retired as a colonel in 1838.

He died aged 81 on 2 November 1866 at Westerfield House, Worthing.
