= Sutton baronets of Norwood Park (1772) =

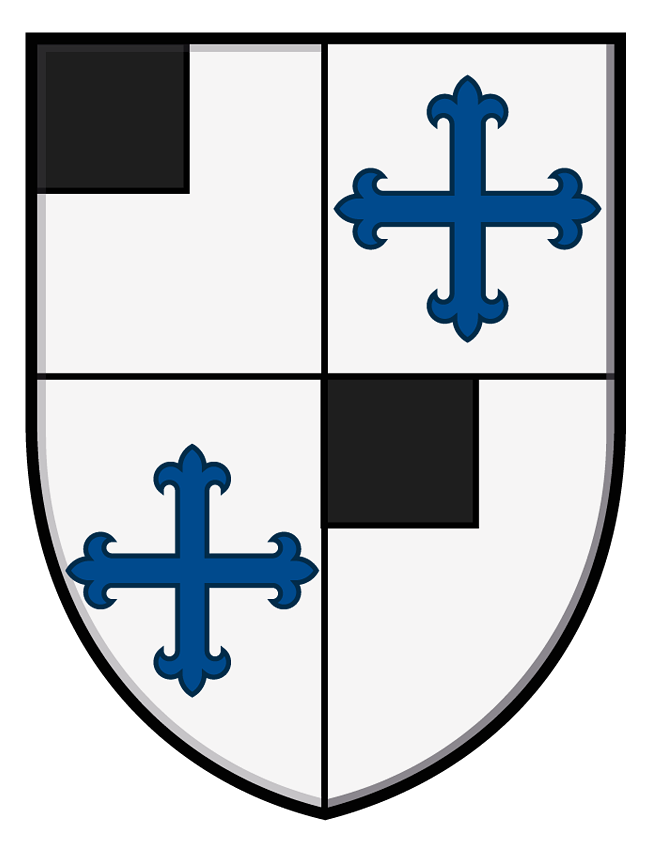
Arms of the Sutton family, Baronets of Norwood Park: 1st and 4th argent, a canton sable (Sutton); 2nd and 3rd argent, a cross fleury azure (Lexington). The crest is a wolf's head gules and the motto is Tout jours prest (French: Always ready).

The Sutton Baronetcy, of Norwood Park in the County of Nottingham, was created in the Baronetage of Great Britain on 14 October 1772 (253 years ago) for the politician Richard Sutton. He was the second surviving son of the diplomat Sir Robert Sutton: who was the grandson of Henry Sutton, brother of Robert Sutton, 1st Baron Lexinton. In the late 19th and early 20th century, the family seat was at Benham Place. However, the house was sold in 1982.

As of 2026, the Baronetcy is vacant until David Robert Sutton proves his entitlement to it.

== Sutton baronets, of Norwood Park (1772) ==
- Sir Richard Sutton, 1st Baronet (1733–1802)
- Sir Richard Sutton, 2nd Baronet (16 December 1798 – 14 November 1855). Sutton succeeded his grandfather in 1802. He was known as a passionate hunter and was Master of the Quorn Hunt, 1847 to 1856. Sutton married Mary Elizabeth Burton (2 November 1797 – 1 January 1842), elder daughter of Benjamin Burton, of Burton Hall, County Carlow, Ireland (a second cousin patrilineally of the 2nd Marquess Conyngham), in 1819. They had seven sons and four daughters.
- Sir John Sutton, 3rd Baronet (1820–1873). Sutton married Emma Helena Sherlock (died January 1845), daughter of Colonel Francis Sherlock, KH, of Southwell, Nottinghamshire, in 1844. They had no children, and he was succeeded by his brother. He was High Sheriff of Nottinghamshire for 1867.
- Sir Richard Sutton, 4th Baronet (1821–1878). He served in the Royal Navy and 1st Life Guards.
- Sir Richard Francis Sutton, 5th Baronet (20 December 1853 – 25 February 1891). Sutton was the owner of the racing yacht Genesta with which he raced Puritan for the America's Cup in 1885. He was married to Constance Corbet, daughter of Sir Vincent Corbet, Bt. He was succeeded by his son. He was Sheriff of Berkshire in 1887.
- Sir Richard Vincent Sutton, 6th Baronet (26 April 1891 – 29 November 1918). Sutton fought as a lieutenant in the World War I and was wounded in action in October 1914. He was one of the richest men in England, owning 13,000 acres (53 km^{2}) and part of the West End in London. His engagement was announced in 1916. He was succeeded by his uncle.
- Sir Arthur Edwin Sutton, 7th Baronet (1857–1948). Son of the 4th Baronet. Sutton bought Shanks in 1920, and held it as his seat until his death. Sir Arthur was married to Cecil Blanche Dumbleton (died 1948), daughter of Walter Douglas Dumbleton. He was succeeded by his son.
- Sir Robert Lexington Sutton, 8th Baronet (1897–1981). He was succeeded by his son.
- Sir Richard Lexington Sutton, 9th Baronet (1937–2021). He was murdered at his Dorset home on 7 April 2021. His net worth was estimated at £301 million in 2020.
- Sir David Robert Sutton (born 1960). He has not claimed the title.

The heir presumptive is the present holder's uncle James Anthony Sutton (born 1940). His heir apparent is his son Tristan Antony Sutton (born 1966). The next heir-in-line is William Oliver Sutton (born 1998).

== Extended family ==
Hugh Clement Sutton (1867–1928) was a Major-General in the British Army, and the third son of the Hon. Henry George Sutton, sixth son of the second Baronet.

== Notes ==
Baronetage of Great Britain
Preceded by Lyde baronets	Sutton baronets of Norwood Park; 14 October 1772	Succeeded by Wright baronets
