= Sir John Keane, 1st Baronet =

Irish politician (1757–1829)

Sir John Keane

Member of Parliament for Youghal
- In office 1801-1806; 1807-1818

Personal details
- Born: 21 May 1757
- Died: 19 April 1829 (aged 71)
- Party: Tory
- Spouse: Sarah Kelly
- Children: 3+, including John and Edward

Sir John Keane, 1st Baronet (21 May 1757 – 19 April 1829), was an Irish Tory politician.

== Biography ==
He was a Member of Parliament (MP) in the Parliament of Ireland for Bangor from 1790 to 1797 and for Youghal from 1798 until the Act of Union of 1800. He continued as MP for Youghal in the new enlarged Parliament of the United Kingdom until the United Kingdom general election of 1806.

He was made a baronet in 1801.

== Personal life ==
Keane married Sarah, daughter of John Kelly, and they had three sons, including John and Edward, who were aide-de-camp to Major-general Sir Hussey Vivian at the Battle of Waterloo.

== Notes ==
Parliament of the United Kingdom
New constituency Created in Act of Union	Member of Parliament for Youghal; 1801–1806	Succeeded by James Bernard
Preceded by Henry Boyle	Member of Parliament for Youghal; 1807–1818	Succeeded by James Bernard
Baronetage of the United Kingdom
New creation	Baronet (of Cappoquin); 1801–1829	Succeeded by Richard Keane
