= Wright baronets of Dagenham (1660) =

Escutcheon of the Wright baronets of Dagenham

The Wright baronetcy, of Dagenham in the County of Essex, was created in the Baronetage of England on 11 June 1660 for Henry Wright, Member of Parliament for Harwich.

Wright, the son of Lawrence Wright (died 1657), physician to Oliver Cromwell, was a Cromwellian baronet, created in 1658 under the Instrument of Government. This title was disallowed on the 1660 Restoration; but was shortly regranted by Charles II.

The title became extinct on the death of the 2nd Baronet in 1681.

== Wright baronets, of Dagenham (1660) ==
- Sir Henry Wright, 1st Baronet (c. 1637–1664)
- Sir Henry Wright, 2nd Baronet (1662–1681)
