= Wright baronets of Cranham Hall (1661) =

Escutcheon of the Wright baronets of Cranham Hall

The Wright baronetcy, of Cranham Hall in the County of Essex, was created in the Baronetage of England on 15 February 1661 for Benjamin Wright. He was the son of Nathan Wright (died 1657), a merchant and Alderman in London, and first cousin of Nathan Wright. His uncle Benjamin Wright was created a baronet, of Dennington, in 1646.

The title became extinct on the death of the 4th baronet in 1738.

== Wright baronets, of Cranham Hall (1661) ==
- Sir Benjamin Wright, 1st Baronet (died 1706)
- Sir Nathan Wright, 2nd Baronet (1661–1727)
- Sir Nathan Wright, 3rd Baronet (1684–1737)
- Sir Samuel Wright, 4th Baronet (died 1738)
